= List of DC Comics characters: K =

== Kaleidoscope ==
Kaleidoscope is a supervillain with photokinetic powers created by Robby Reed's villain personality Master from the cell samples of an unknown person. She fought Chris King and Vicki Grant. She was originally created by two fans, Chris Lawton and Nancy Mae Lawton in 1982.

=== Kaleidoscope in other media ===
Kaleidoscope appears in The Suicide Squad, portrayed by Natalia Safran.

== Kalibak ==
Kalibak (/ˈkælɪbæk/) is a supervillain appearing in comic books published by DC Comics. He is the eldest son of Darkseid, half-brother of Orion and Grayven, and an enemy of Superman and the Justice League. Created by Jack Kirby, Kalibak first appeared in New Gods #1 (February 1971) in the Silver Age of Comic Books. His name is derived from Caliban, a character from William Shakespeare's The Tempest.

Kalibak is the first-born son of Darkseid and Suli. His mother Suli is killed by DeSaad, acting under orders from Kalibak's grandmother Heggra. Kalibak becomes a legendary warrior, and often serves as Darkseid's second-in-command. After Darkseid breaks the pact of peace with New Genesis, the rival planet of Kalibak's home Apokolips, he aids his father in the resulting battles.

Kalibak is often pitted against Orion, and after numerous clashes, they learn that they are half-brothers. This fuels Kalibak's hatred of Orion to new levels, for Darkseid clearly respects Orion over his first-born. Kalibak secretly craves the love and respect of his father and has a gentle side which he keeps hidden, as any sign of weakness will be punished.

In Death of the New Gods, Kalibak is killed by Infinity-Man. In Final Crisis, Kalibak is reborn alongside his father and Kanto. He later gains a humanoid tiger-like form engineered by Simyan and Mokkari. He leads a regiment of tiger soldiers against the heroes in Blüdhaven, but he is killed in combat with Tawky Tawny.

Kalibak is later resurrected following The New 52 continuity reboot. At the start of the publishing line DC All In, Darkseid kills Kalibak to power the Miracle Machine and harness the Spectre's energy.

=== Powers and abilities of Kalibak ===
As a New God, Kalibak is nigh-immortal and possesses immense physical abilities. He is armed with a Beta-Club, a weapon that fires debilitating force bolts. He can also summon and use aero-disks which allow him to fly. Kalibak's father once augmented his firstborn's physical abilities and even gave him new ones to aid in acquiring Martin Stein; he was made powerful enough to best his half-brother in a physical battle and discharge psi-beams that function similarly to Darkseid's Omega Beams. Kalibak once harbored 3rd world technology called a Thunderbelt, which vastly augmented his physical strength to the point he could better overcome Orion. However, the Thunderbelt operated more as a control mechanism than an asset designed by DeSaad on behalf of Darkseid himself. Using it was highly addicting and caused excruciating pain when deactivated remotely.

=== Kalibak in other media ===
Television

- Kalibak appears in Super Friends, voiced by Frank Welker.
- Kalibak appears in series set in the DC Animated Universe (DCAU), voiced by Michael Dorn.
  - Kalibak first appears in Superman: The Animated Series.
  - Kalibak appears in the Justice League episodes "Twilight" and "Hereafter". In "Hereafter", he joins the Superman Revenge Squad in a plot to kill Superman.
  - Kalibak appears in the Justice League Unlimited episode "The Ties That Bind".
- Kalibak appears in Batman: The Brave and the Bold, voiced by Michael-Leon Wooley.
- Kalibak appears in the Justice League Action episode "Superman's Pal, Sid Sharp", voiced by Piotr Michael.
- Kalibak appears in Young Justice, voiced by Dee Bradley Baker.

Film

- An alternate universe version of Kalibak makes a non-speaking appearance in Justice League: Gods and Monsters.

Video games

- Kalibak appears as a boss in DC Universe Online.
- Kalibak appears as a character summon in Scribblenauts Unmasked: A DC Comics Adventure.
- Kalibak appears as a playable character in Lego Batman 3: Beyond Gotham, voiced by Travis Willingham.
- Kalibak appears in Lego DC Super-Villains, voiced again by Michael Dorn.

Miscellaneous

- Kalibak appears in Injustice: Gods Among Us #8. He attempts to attack Superman, but is killed by him.
- Kalibak appears in DC x Sonic the Hedgehog.

== Adeline Kane ==
Adeline Kane is a character appearing in American comic books published by DC Comics. The character was created by Marv Wolfman and George Pérez, and first appeared in The New Teen Titans #34 (August 1983). She is the ex-wife of Slade Wilson / Deathstroke, and the mother of Jericho and Grant Wilson.

Adeline Kane, formerly Adeline Wilson, is the leader of the criminal organization H.I.V.E. and an enemy of the Teen Titans. She was brought up as a wealthy jet-setting playgirl, despite being trained by a father who had worked with Chinese guerrilla forces. After a traumatic first marriage at 19, she joined the U.S. military, where she met, trained, and married Slade. Unbeknownst to Adeline, Slade was using his hunting trips to gain clients for his mercenary side job, which resulted in the kidnapping and near-death of their younger son Joseph Wilson. Enraged and betrayed by Slade prioritizing his honor code over their son's well-being, Adeline divorces Slade.

Their elder son Grant, who had idolized his father, rebels against his mother and runs away to New York, where he encounters the Titans and is killed in battle. Slade vows to pick up his dead son's contract against the Teen Titans, but Adeline interferes, blaming Slade for Grant's death. Due to Adeline's intervention, Joseph who had been working with her and joins the Titans as Jericho.

When Adeline is abducted and poisoned by her first husband Morel, Slade gives her a transfusion of his altered blood to save her life. However, this drives her insane due to her lacking the mutation that enabled Slade to effectively metabolize the serum present in his blood. She is mortally wounded by Vandal Savage who seeks to harness her blood to create a youth serum, and mercy killed by Starfire.

In The New 52 continuity reboot, Adeline is a former US Army squadron leader and drill instructor for Team 7.

=== Adeline Kane in other media ===
- Adeline Kane appears in Titans, portrayed by Mayko Nguyen.
- Adeline Kane appears in Deathstroke: Knights & Dragons, voiced by Sasha Alexander.

== Jacob Kane ==
Jacob Kane is a character appearing in American comic books published by DC Comics. Kane debuted in the Batwoman, created by J. H. Williams III and Greg Rucka.

Jacob and his wife Gabrielle "Gabi" Kane were both soldiers in the U.S. Army (he was a member of the 3rd Special Forces Group and she part of the 525th Battlefield Surveillance Brigade), and are the parents of Kate Kane and Beth Kane. The Kanes are Jewish and Jacob inherited vast wealth along with his other siblings. Bette Kane (the superheroine known as Flamebird, and later Hawkfire) is his niece and Bruce Wayne is his nephew, since Martha Wayne was Jacob's sister.

Kane is promoted to colonel and assigned to NATO headquarters in Brussels, Belgium. When the twins turned 12 years old, their mother took them to a restaurant for a birthday dessert, despite Jacob being away due to a security crisis. A terrorist group (later revealed to be the organization known as the "Many Arms of Death") kidnapped the family during their trip, and Kane led a rescue mission to save them. During the raid, Gabrielle was murdered by the terrorists. The terrorists kidnapped another young girl and murdered her too. Kate, seeing the body of a young girl under a blanket, is left with the impression her sister died. Kane, however, knew that the terrorists had Beth. Despite looking for years, Kane never found Beth. He never told Kate that Beth might still be alive. Kane remarries years later to Hamilton Rifle Company heiress Catherine Hamilton, who becomes Kate's stepmother.

Jacob's emotional steadiness proved to be a major source of stability for Kate in the aftermath of the tragedy, and she sought to emulate that for herself and follow him into Army service, which Jacob supported. Thanks to his higher rank, Jacob was able to be more present in Kate's life during this time. He taught Kate how to box when she was a teenager, accompanied her to R-Day at West Point when she was an incoming freshman, and is implied to have given Kate ringside coaching during an academy championship boxing match that helped her win the fight. Kate's resignation from the academy due to DADT allegations took Jacob by surprise, but he immediately accepted her when she came out to him.

After Kate became a vigilante, Jacob aided her campaign against crime by organizing her training, designing her Batwoman suit and gear, developing her operational headquarters, and maintaining radio contact with her during patrols to provide information and advice.

The Alice persona kidnaps Kane, who immediately recognizes as his now-grown daughter Beth, and uses him to gain access to a military base near Gotham City. She seizes chemical weapons from the base and intends to kill everyone in the city by dispersing them from an aircraft. Alice falls into Gotham Bay during her final battle with Batwoman after revealing her identity, and is again presumed dead.

In 2011, DC Comics rebooted the DC universe through "The New 52". Jacob's history of losing his wife and what happened to Beth remains intact, as well as his support for Kate's campaign as Batwoman. In addition, the New 52 establishes that an informal group of Jacob's closest friends within the special operations community, known as the Murder of Crows, were the ones Jacob assembled to conduct Kate's Batwoman training.

Jacob has been depicted as a highly decorated soldier, appearing with the following awards: the Army Achievement Medal, the Kosovo Campaign Medal, the Afghanistan Campaign Medal, the Iraq Campaign Medal, the Global War on Terrorism Expeditionary Medal, the Global War on Terrorism Service Medal, the NATO Medal for Kosovo, the Kuwait Liberation Medal, the Presidential Unit Citation, the Meritorious Unit Commendation, the Army Aviator Badge, the Air Assault Badge, and the Combat Infantryman Badge.

=== Jacob Kane in other media ===
- Jacob Kane appears in Batwoman, portrayed by Dougray Scott. This version is the founder of the Crows security firm and married Catherine Hamilton-Kane following the death of his wife Gabi.
- Jacob Kane appears in Batman: Bad Blood, voiced by Geoff Pierson.
- Jacob Kane appears in Gotham Knights, voiced by Tommie Earl Jenkins. This version is the head of Kane Industries and leader of the Court of Owls who is aware of Batman and his proteges' identities. After learning of his connection to the Court, the Gotham Knights apprehend Jacob, but Talia al Ghul kills him before he can be handed over to the police.

== Kanto ==
Kanto is a supervillain appearing in media published by DC Comics. He first appeared in Mister Miracle #7 (March/April 1972), and was created by Jack Kirby.

A student of Granny Goodness on Apokolips, Iluthin is accused of stealing weaponry from Darkseid's master assassin Kanto 13 during the Renaissance era, resulting in him being exiled to Earth. There, he trains under Italian teachers and falls in love with a woman named Claudia. Kanto 13 tracks Iluthin to Earth and kills Claudia at the couple's wedding altar. Iluthin defeats Kanto 13, who is killed by Darkseid, and becomes Kanto's successor.

=== Kanto in other media ===
- Kanto appears in series set in the DC Animated Universe, voiced by Michael York in Superman: The Animated Series and Corey Burton in Justice League Unlimited. This version is an associate of Intergang.
- Kanto appears in Justice League Action, voiced by Troy Baker.
- Kanto appears in Superman: Shadow of Apokolips, voiced again by Michael York.
- Kanto appears as a character summon in Scribblenauts Unmasked: A DC Comics Adventure.
- Kanto appears as a playable character and boss in Lego DC Super-Villains, voiced again by Corey Burton.

== Ian Karkull ==
Ian Karkull is a supervillain in comic books published by DC Comics. He first appeared in More Fun Comics #69 (August 1941) as a foe of the sorcerer Doctor Fate. He later became a recurring foe of the All-Star Squadron and the Justice Society of America, beginning in All-Star Squadron Annual #3.

In the late 1930s, Ian Karkull is a scientist and archaeologist working in the Sahara Desert with partner Everett Dahlen to find Ragnor, a mystic city rumored to possess great wealth and a knowledge of dark powers. However, Dahlen betrays Karkull and leaves him for dead, during which he learns magic before being rescued by nomadic Arabs. After returning to the United States, Karkull builds a machine that can transform men into intangible shadows. He kills Dahlen out of revenge, but attracts the attention of Doctor Fate. Karkull transforms into a shadow to evade him, but Fate destroys the machine that would have returned him to human form.

Karkull manipulates Obsidian to gain access to and subsequently rule the shadow lands. Karkull had seemingly been corrupting Obsidian for months in an effort to get revenge on his enemies in the Justice Society. Obsidian kills Karkull, using his energy to empower himself.

=== Ian Karkull in other media ===
Karkull appears in the Superman: The Animated Series episode "The Hand of Fate", voiced by Ted Levine. This version is a demon who was imprisoned in a tablet by Doctor Fate.

== Barbara Kean ==
Barbara Eileen Kean is a character appearing in DC Comics. She is James "Jim" Gordon's ex-wife and Barbara Gordon's mother in post-Crisis continuity.

Her history and existence has been repeatedly retconned over the years, sometimes implying that she died in a car crash, other times that she left Gotham with James for Chicago. During the New 52 era, Barbara left her family because she was afraid that James Jr. would hurt his sister. Several years later, she returns to Gotham in the hopes of re-connecting with her daughter.

In Batman: Year One, Jim has a brief affair with Detective Sarah Essen. Jim tries to rebuild his relationship with his family after Essen leaves Gotham. Barbara and Jim attend marriage counseling.

=== Barbara Kean in other media ===
- Barbara Kean appears in The Dark Knight, portrayed by Melinda McGraw.
- Barbara Kean appears in Batman: Year One, voiced by Grey DeLisle.
- Barbara Kean appears in Gotham, portrayed by Erin Richards. This version is Jim Gordon's fiancée and a gangster who turned to crime after murdering her wealthy parents. In the final season, she becomes pregnant after a one-night stand with Gordon, who has by now left her for Lee Thompkins, and gives birth to their daughter, Barbara Lee Gordon. The show's series finale portrays her years later having given up crime and become a legitimate businesswoman, and sharing custody of Barbara Lee with Gordon and Thompkins. The series also portrays her as being bisexual, and having on-off relationships with Renee Montoya and Tabitha Galavan.
- Barbara Kean appears in Batwoman, portrayed by Sara Southey. This version is an art gallery owner and member of Black Glove.
- Barbara Kean / Two-Face appears in Batman: Gotham by Gaslight, voiced by Kari Wuhrer.
- Barbara Kean appears in Harley Quinn, voiced by Lake Bell.
- Barbara Kean appears in Batman: The Long Halloween, voiced by Amy Landecker.

== Keeg Bovo ==
Keeg Bovo is an entity from another dimension called "the Negative Space". As Larry Trainor flew his plane into a radioactive field, Keeg Bovo was connected to Larry as his "Negative Spirit". This connection was unbeknownst to him for years, believing he had been transformed into a metahuman with negative powers, but eventually, Larry learnt how to summon and control Keeg from his body.

=== Keeg Bovo in other media ===
Keeg Bovo appears in Doom Patrol.

== Karen Keeny ==
Karen Keeny is a character who appears in Year One: Batman/Scarecrow (July 2005). She is the mother of Jonathan Crane.

Karen is the youngest daughter in a long line of Georgia gentry from Arlen. She was raised by her strict mother and grandmother, which led to her having a rebellious youth. Karen meets Gerald Crane, going into a short relationship and later becoming pregnant. She was not allowed to raise her child – even the naming was done by her grandmother.

Karen moved to Latham, marrying a man named Charlie Jarvis, who was abusive and jealous, wanting above all the deed to the family mansion, which she didn't have. When her son came back to kill his last remaining relatives, Charlie became more jealous, as she received strange letters under her maiden name. When Scarecrow comes to her house, he kills Jarvis and was going to kill Karen and her infant daughter when Batman arrives and stops him.

Knowing all the people he had killed, Karen felt guilty for Jonathan's deeds and contemplated suicide, but talked out of it by Deadman.

=== Karen Keeny in other media ===
Karen Keeny, renamed Karen Crane, appears in Gotham, portrayed by Dorothea Harahan. In addition to being the mother of Jonathan Crane, this version is the wife of Gerald Crane who died in a fire a year prior. As Jonathan was able to rescue her, but became paralyzed with fear, Gerald was inspired to cure him and himself of their fear.

== Gretchen Kelley ==
Gretchen Kelley is a physician who once tended to the injuries of a younger Lex Luthor. Kelley is later imprisoned under unknown circumstances before Luthor frees her and has her become his personal physician.

Luthor later transfers his consciousness into a younger clone body and poses as his own son, with Kelley posing as his mother.

=== Gretchen Kelley in other media ===
Gretchen Kelley appears in Lois & Clark: The New Adventures of Superman, portrayed by Denise Crosby. Following Lex Luthor's death in the first season, Kelley makes several attempts to resurrect him after receiving his body from Lex's ex-wife Ariana Carlin. In the second-season episode "The Phoenix", Kelley succeeds in reviving Luthor. However, Kelley saves Lois Lane's life, leading Luthor to murder her.

== Ariella Kent ==
Ariella Kent is a character appearing in American comic books published by DC Comics. The character first appeared in Supergirl #1,000,000, created by Peter David and Dusty Abell.

Ariella Kent is the daughter of Linda Danvers and the pre-Crisis version of Superman. After the Spectre returns Linda to the post-Crisis era, Ariella is left alone and travels to the 853rd century, where she unknowingly causes massive devastation. Her ability to time-travel carried her to the 853rd century, where she saved a planet from destruction by playing with the invaders (and accidentally destroying all of their ships and weapons). Later, she time-traveled to the post-Crisis era, shortly after the "Sins of Youth" storyline, and met Klarion the Witch Boy (who seemed smitten with her).

In an interview with Newsarama, Dan DiDio stated that Linda was wiped from existence following the events of Infinite Crisis. However, Geoff Johns later stated in 2006: "As for this…huh? Linda Danvers hasn't been retconned out at all". Linda appeared in the 2008 comic Reign in Hell, but the existence of Ariella in current canon has yet to be established.

A hybrid of metahuman/Kryptonian heritage, Ariella possesses immense strength, durability, and speed and a slowed aging process, as well as the ability to fly, travel through time at will, move objects with her mind, teleport, and duplicate herself. Due to her vast level of power and young age, Ariella is not always able to restrain herself.

== William Kenzie ==
William Kenzie is a character appearing in American comic books published by DC Comics. He was created by Greg Rucka and Steve Lieber in Gotham Central #32 (August 2005).

William Kenzie is a corrupt officer of the Gotham City Police Department, involved in an operation to profit a percentage from illegal sales.

=== William Kenzie in other media ===
William Kenzie appears in The Batman (2022), where he works for Carmine Falcone, and The Penguin (2024). He is portrayed by Peter McDonald.

== Kha-Ef-Re ==
Kha-Ef-Re is a character appearing in American comic books published by DC Comics. The character, created by Joe Gill and Bill Fraccio, first appeared in Blue Beetle vol. 3 #1 (June 1964) as the Giant Mummy. He was a pharaoh who was an early wielder of the Blue Beetle scarab, but he is defeated by Dan Garrett. The pharaoh's spirit later returns, possessing Javier Basualdo as the Blood Scarab.

== Khalis ==
Khalis is a powerful priest and servant of Anubis born as Hetepkheti Tefnakhte, who was the original owner of the Amulet of Anubis until it was taken by Nabu. Mummified, he appears in the 1940s as an enemy of Doctor Fate. With Inza Cramer's help, Doctor Fate defeats Khalis and seals him away. Khalis is later recruited into the Creature Commandos, serving as the team's medic.

=== Khalis in other media ===
Khalis appears in Creature Commandos, voiced by Miko Hamada. This version is a member of the eponymous team.

== Kilg%re ==
Kilg%re (pronounced "Kilgore") is a character appearing in American comic books published by DC Comics. It was created by Mike Baron and Jackson Guice, and first appeared in The Flash (vol. 2) #3 (August 1987).

Kilg%re is an electro-mechano-organic intelligence that requires electro-life to survive and is an enemy of the Wally West/The Flash. and Justice League International. Kilg%re consumed its entire home planet in the Pleides sector and then moved on into space. It was attacked by Meta#sker and placed into a vibrational limbo. The Flash unknowingly released it from the limbo it was imprisoned in and it followed him to S.T.A.R. Labs and took over its electrical systems. Kilg%re found the number of machines on Earth ideal for its survival, but humans it deemed distractions and planned to destroy them.

=== Powers and abilities of Kilg%re ===
Kilg%re, being a machine, is able to communicate with and disrupt other machines. It is additionally able to move at superhuman speeds and generate electricity.

=== Kilg%re in other media ===
- A human version of Kilg%re appears in the fourth season of The Flash, portrayed by Dominic Burgess. This version is Ramsey Deacon, a human computer programmer who developed an application that his teammates stole for self-profit, leaving him with nothing. Following this, the Thinker tricks the Flash into exposing Deacon to dark matter, turning him into a technopathic metahuman. Ramsey takes the name "Kilg%re" and uses his powers to take revenge on his former teammates, killing one and nearly doing the same to the others until he is stopped by Team Flash and remanded to Iron Heights Penitentiary. In the episode "True Colors", Kilg%re, Dwarfstar, Hazard, and Black Bison mount an escape attempt before Warden Gregory Wolfe can sell them to Amunet Black, but the Thinker kills them for their powers.
- Kilg%re appears in Justice League Adventures #28. This version is Ludwig Dyteman, who was motivated to commit crimes to save his terminally ill niece. After learning that a cure was available all along, a remorseful Dyteman gives the Justice League a device to stop his missiles before deleting himself from existence.
- Kilg%re appears in Green Lantern: The Animated Series #14.
- Kilg%re appears in Justice League x RWBY: Super Heroes & Huntsmen, voiced by Tru Valentino.

== Killer Moth ==
Interior artwork from Batman Family #15 (December 1977). Art by Michael Golden.

Killer Moth is a supervillain appearing in American comic books published by DC Comics, usually as an adversary and foil of Batman and Batgirl. Killer Moth first appeared in Batman #63 (February 1951) and was created by Bill Finger, Dick Sprang, and Lew Sayre Schwartz. In his original incarnation, Killer Moth has no superhuman abilities, but relies on the vast array of equipment he had developed, including a Mothmobile, zipline cables, a cocoon gun, and an air pistol.

=== Pre-Crisis Killer Moth ===
The original Killer Moth was a prisoner identified only by his prison number, 234026. While in prison, he reads a newspaper article about Batman and decides to set himself up as the "anti-Batman", hiring himself out to Gotham City's criminals to help them elude capture by police. Upon his release, he uses the hidden proceeds of his crimes to build a "Mothcave", modeled on the Batcave. Killer Moth establishes a false identity as millionaire philanthropist Cameron van Cleer, during which he befriends Bruce Wayne.

=== Drury Walker ===
In the 1990s, in the post-Crisis continuity, Killer Moth's real identity is revealed as Drury Walker, an unsuccessful criminal who is not taken seriously. He again adopts the false identity of Cameron van Cleer and the persona of Killer Moth to fight Batman. In the Underworld Unleashed storyline, Killer Moth was transformed into a moth-like creature called Charaxes after seling his soul to Neron, seeking to gain power and be feared.

During the "Infinite Crisis" storyline, Charaxes appears as a member of Alexander Luthor Jr.'s Secret Society of Super Villains. He is later killed by Superboy-Prime during the Battle of Metropolis.

Killer Moth was resurrected following The New 52, where he is a member of the Longbow Hunters and an enemy of Green Arrow. Walker later returned to Gotham City in the series Batgirls, partnering with (and eventually betrayed by) the Riddler.

=== Third Killer Moth ===
A new Killer Moth appears in Batman #652, during the Face the Face storyline wherein he displays competence in hand-to-hand combat and the ability of flight when facing Robin. He later appears working alongside fellow Gotham criminals Firefly and Lock-Up in the Gotham Underground miniseries. The identity and origins of this new Killer Moth remain unrevealed.

Several villains clad in Killer Moth costumes appear in Secret Six (vol. 3) #7. At least one of them is killed by Deadshot. Killer Moth appears in the first issue of the miniseries Justice League: Cry for Justice, where he is hired by Prometheus to kidnap and torture Mike Dante, ex-assistant to Atom ally Professor Hyatt. Ray Palmer and Ryan Choi track Killer Moth and his goons down to a hideout in Albuquerque, New Mexico and defeat them all.

=== Killer Moth in other media ===
==== Television ====
- Killer Moth appears in Teen Titans, voiced initially by Thomas Haden Church and later by Marc Worden. This version is a lepidopterist, member of the Brotherhood of Evil, and father of a spoiled daughter named Kitten.
- Killer Moth, based on the Drury Walker incarnation, appears in The Batman, voiced by Jeff Bennett. This version is a physically weak individual with a milquetoast personality and poor combat capabilities who is later mutated into a monstrous Charaxes-esque form nicknamed "Mothy".
- An amalgamated incarnation of Killer Moth appears in Batman: The Brave and the Bold, voiced by Corey Burton. This version is based on Drury Walker and once used the Cameron van Cleer alias.
- Killer Moth appears in Teen Titans Go!, voiced by Scott Menville.
- Killer Moth appears in the DC Super Hero Girls (2019) episode "#BreakingNews". This version is a female mutant moth.
- Killer Moth appears in Beast Boy: Lone Wolf.
- Killer Moth appears in Bat-Fam, voiced by Diedrich Bader. This version is an ex-villain.

==== Film ====
- Killer Moth appears in Batman: Bad Blood, voiced by Jason Spisak. This version is a mercenary aligned with the League of Assassins.
- Killer Moth appears in The Lego Batman Movie.
- Killer Moth appears in Scooby-Doo! & Batman: The Brave and the Bold.

==== Video games ====
- Killer Moth appears as a boss in Batman: The Video Game.
- Killer Moth appears as a character summon in Scribblenauts Unmasked: A DC Comics Adventure.
- The Drury Walker incarnation of Killer Moth appears as a playable character and boss in Lego Batman: The Video Game, with vocal effects provided by Steve Blum.
- Killer Moth appears as a boss and playable character in Lego Batman 2: DC Super Heroes, voiced by Joseph Balderrama.
- Killer Moth appears as a playable character in Lego Batman 3: Beyond Gotham, voiced by Christopher Corey Smith.
- Killer Moth appears in Lego Batman: Legacy of the Dark Knight.

==== Miscellaneous ====
- Killer Moth appears in DC Super Hero Girls (2015), voiced by Phil LaMarr.
- Killer Moth appears in the Injustice 2 prequel comic as a member of the Suicide Squad before he is killed by Jason Todd.
- Killer Moth appears as part of Lego's LEGO Batman Series 2 minifigure collection.
- Killer Moth appears in the novel Batman: Revolution

== Thaddeus Killgrave ==
Thaddeus Killgrave is a villain in DC Comics primarily of Superman, debuting in Superman (vol. 2) #19 (July 1988) by John Byrne.

Professor Thaddeus Killgrave is a mad scientist with dwarfism who would either create technology to fight Superman or sell them to other criminals. He was a frequent collaborator of Intergang in their fight against Superman.

=== Thaddeus Killgrave in other media ===
- Killgrave appears in the Lois & Clark: The New Adventures of Superman tie-in novel Exile. This version is an egotistical criminal with an obsession with weapons of mass destruction who is dismissive of humanity.
- Thaddeus Killgrave appears in the Superman & Lois episode "Haywire", portrayed by Brendan Fletcher.
- Thaddeus Killgrave appears as a character summon in Scribblenauts Unmasked: A DC Comics Adventure.

== Cheryl Kimble ==
Cheryl Kimble is a scientist who is the head of LexCorp's space division.

=== Cheryl Kimble in other media ===
- Cheryl Kimble appears in the third season of Superman & Lois, portrayed by Rebecca Staab.
- Cheryl Kimble appears in Superman (2025), portrayed by Giovannie Cruz.

== King Chimera ==
King Chimera is a fictional superhero in the DC Comics universe, a member of the superhero team the Justice Society of America. King Chimera first appeared in Justice Society of America (vol. 3) #24 (April 2009), and was created by Lilah Sturges and Fernando Pasarín. The character was inspired by King Standish, a superhero from the Golden Age of Comic Books.

King has kept a mysterious identity since his debut, as very little is known about his past, so much that his real name has not been revealed. He claims to be the son of King Standish. King Chimera's parents taught him to bend light and sound to cast illusions. King explained to Sand that his power is to conjure anything he has seen or heard into a chimera, misdirecting his enemies so they defeat themselves.

== King Cobra ==
King Cobra is the name of two characters appearing in American comic books published by DC Comics.

=== Batman villain ===
The King Cobra is a mob boss in Gotham City who wears a green snake costume. He is the leader of a criminal group called the Cobra Gang. He makes his first appearance in Batman #139 (April 1961).

=== Shadow villain ===
This version of the King Cobra is a New York City gangster and an enemy to Kent Allard.

=== Other versions of King Cobra ===
- The Batman Beyond version of the King Cobra appears in the Batman Beyond comic series.
- King Cobra appears in the final issue of Batman '66.

=== King Cobra in other media ===
- The first incarnation of King Cobra appears in the title sequence of Batman (1966).
- An original incarnation of King Cobra appears in the Batman Beyond episode "Splicers", voiced by Tim Dang. This version is an unnamed teenager who was transformed into a snake hybrid by geneticist Dr. Abel Cuvier and fights Batman before being defeated and given an antidote that reverts him to normal.
- The first incarnation of King Cobra appears in Batman: The Brave and the Bold.
- The first incarnation of King Cobra appears in Scooby-Doo! & Batman: The Brave and the Bold.

== Shondra Kinsolving ==
Shondra Kinsolving first appeared in Batman #481 (July 1992) and was created by Doug Moench and Jim Aparo.

Shondra Kinsolving is a metahuman and the sister of Benedict Asp with the ability to both heal and harm others with a touch. During the "Batman: Knightfall" storyline, Kinsolving helped heal Batman after his spine was broken by Bane.

Bruce wheelchair bound witnesses her alongside Tim Drake's father Jack, being kidnapped by armed men working for her brother. He leaves Gotham to rescue them, finally tracking them down in a small village. Shondra informs Bruce that she helped her brother murder their father and then became a doctor using her abilities as penance for what she did, often regressing into a childlike state in an effort to regain her lost innocence. Shondra and Bruce attempt an ambush on Asp but he is able to subdue both physically. To protect Bruce, Shondra initiates a psychic showdown between herself and her sibling, Bruce caught in the middle has his spine healed by a psionic jolt. The stress of which renders Shondra in a permanent childlike state and kills Benedict.

=== Shondra Kinsolving in other media ===
Shondra Kinsolving appears in Batman: Knightfall, voiced by Toks Olagundoye.

== Willoughby Kipling ==
Willoughby Kipling is a character in the DC Comics universe. He first appeared in Doom Patrol (vol. 2) #31 and was created by Grant Morrison and Richard Case.

Kipling appears mostly in the Doom Patrol comic series. The character was originally intended to be John Constantine, but at the time DC Comics editorial policy limited Constantine's use outside of his own series to preserve the realism of the character. Kipling was created as a substitute, and was based upon Richard E. Grant's title character from the British cult film Withnail and I. He appeared intermittently, helping the team against various threats, such as the Cult of the Unwritten Book and the Candlemaker. He is a member of the mystic Knights Templar, a coward who practices black magic and is a self-proclaimed expert on the occult.

Later, Kipling's voice-over appears in JLA Classified #15 (February 2006). He and several other magic-users use their knowledge to assist Oracle and the Justice League of America against a mystic threat.

=== Willougby Kipling in other media ===
Willoughby Kipling appears in Doom Patrol, portrayed by Mark Sheppard as an adult and Tyler Crumley as a child.

== Kirigi ==
Takibi Kirigi is a character appearing in American comic books published by DC Comics. The character, created by James Owsley and Jim Aparo, first appeared in Batman #431 (March 1989).

Takabi Kirigi is a martial arts master taught Bruce Wayne the art of ninjitsu when Bruce approached him for martial arts training. Kirigi was later hired by Ra's al Ghul to train members of the League of Assassins in ninjutsu such as the Bronze Tiger. Batman visited Kirigi when he recognized some of the moves done by the League of Assassins members that Kirigi taught him.

=== Kirigi in other media ===
Kirigi appears in Batman: Arkham Origins, voiced by Kaiji Tang. This version is based in North Korea.

== Kismet ==
- First appearance: Adventures of Superman #494 (September, 1992)
- Created by: Jerry Ordway; Tom Grummett
- Species: Cosmic being
- Teams: Lords of Order
- Abilities: A cosmic being of vast power, Kismet's powers includes manipulation of reality, time travel, and astral projection.
- Aliases: Illuminator of All Realities

Kismet is a cosmic entity appearing in American comic books published by DC Comics. Created by Jerry Ordway and Tom Grummet, the character first appeared in Adventures of Superman #494 (September, 1992). One of the most powerful beings in the DC Universe, she is a Lord of Order whose responsibilities makes her both a defender against the forces of evil and a embodiment of the aforementioned universe.

Born on a distant planet as Ahti, she was both an alien priestess and paramour of her peer, Tuoni. The pair had fallen out when was chosen and ascended into the "Kismet" role, which Tunoi also coveted, ascending as a Lord of Chaos studying forbidden magic at the cost of his physical body during a battle with Ahti, who showed mercy by shunting his shattered body into the Phantom Zone. Tunoi eventually regained his body thanks to a projection of Kem-L, an ancestor of Superman unaware of his true nature, with arcane Kryptonian science and became Kismet's rival, coveting her cosmic powers. She would appear numerous times as Superman's ally, including when she assisted him in defeating Imperiex.

She would later become involved in various crossovers with the Marvel Universe; both herself and Eternity were kidnapped by Krona when the Grandmaster engineers a merging of the Marvel Universe and the DC Universe, who use their connections to their universes in an attempt to destroy both so he can learn their secrets. The pair also fell in love for a brief time. In another instance, the pair's brief coupling allowed for the universes to crossover once more.

== Knightfall ==
Knightfall (Charise Carnes) is a character appearing in American comic books published by DC Comics. She first appeared in Batgirl (vol. 4) #10 (August 2012) and was created by Gail Simone and Alitha Martinez.

Carnes is known for her devious behavior. Often obscuring her true motives behind a facade of youthful innocence, Carnes has built a network of judges, lawyers, and others willing to assist her. This network, coupled with the vast family fortune at her disposal, gives Carnes the resources to make Knightfall a formidable opponent. As a combatant when facing off against Batgirl, Carnes prefers knives, specifically the two previously used in the murder of her family.

== Komodo ==
- Further reading: Komodo at the Grand Comics Database

Komodo (Simon Lacroix) is a character appearing in American comic books published by DC Comics. He first appears in Green Arrow (vol. 5) #17 (April 2013) and was created by writer Jeff Lemire and artist Andrea Sorrentino.

Komodo was once Robert Queen's protégé and was part of Robert's expedition to find the "Arrow Totem", which was said to bring enlightenment. Seeking this enlightenment for himself, Lacroix betrayed and murdered Robert, but could not find the Totem. Consumed by his desire for the Totem's enlightenment, Lacroix strove to destroy Oliver Queen and the Green Arrow and became the masked archer "Komodo". Through his company Stellmoor International, he works on behalf of the Outsiders, a shadowy secret society of warriors from different weapon disciplines, which he wants to rule. Komodo travels with his "daughter" Emiko, who, in fact, is the daughter of Robert Queen and Shado. Emiko later learns this and is shocked, and learning that both her parents were alive, turned against Komodo. He attempted to kill her but, ultimately, she killed him with an arrow through his heart.

=== Komodo in other media ===
Komodo appears in the Arrow episode "Sara", portrayed by Matt Ward. This version is a Canadian mercenary.

== Jarvis Kord ==
Jarvis Kord is the scientist uncle of Ted Kord. Created by D.C. Glanzman and Steve Ditko, he first appeared in Secret Origins (vol. 2) #2 (May 1986).

Jarvis Kord worked to create an army of androids to take over Earth, resulting in his nephew and Dan Garrett foiling his ambitions; Jarvis killed the original Blue Beetle and himself during their battle which inspired the second Blue Beetle.

=== Jarvis Kord in other media ===
Jarvis Kord appears in the Batman: The Brave and the Bold episode "Fall of the Blue Beetle!", voiced by Tim Matheson.

== Victoria Kord ==
Victoria Kord is a character appearing in American comic books published by DC Comics. She was created for the film Blue Beetle, but debuted in the comic series Blue Beetle: Graduation Day prior to the film's premiere.

Victoria Kord is the sister of Ted Kord and the CEO of Kord Industries.

=== Victoria Kord in other media ===
Victoria Kord appears in Blue Beetle, portrayed by Susan Sarandon. In addition to being the CEO of Kord Industries, she has a niece named Jennifer "Jenny" Kord and is served by Ignacio Carapax. Displeased by Ted's activities, Victoria attempts to use the Blue Beetle scarab to develop and mass-produce the OMAC project. However, Jenny steals the scarab and gives it to Jaime Reyes. Victoria sends Carapax to kill him and retrieve the scarab, but Jaime discovers Victoria killed Carapax's mother and reveals it to him. Carapax subsequently betrays and kills Victoria.

== Kordax ==
Kordax is an ancestor of Aquaman who commands all sea life. He was born to Queen Cora of Poseidonis but abandoned at birth due to his grotesque, green-scaled body, managing to survive in the ocean thanks to his mental control over sea creatures. As an adult, he returned to Atlantis leading an army of sharks in a failed bid for the throne. His punishment included the loss of his left hand (replaced with a sword) and banishment. Kordak was later killed by Aquaman.

=== Kordax in other media ===
- Kordax appears as a character summon in Scribblenauts Unmasked: A DC Comics Adventure.
- Kordax appears in Aquaman and the Lost Kingdom, portrayed by Pilou Asbæk. This version is the evil brother of King Atlan, creator of the Black Trident, and founder of the lost kingdom of Necrus who was banished for attempting to usurp Atlantis' throne from his brother and later sealed by blood magic.

== Korge ==
Korge is a character appearing in American comic books published by DC Comics. He first appeared in Justice League of America #115 and was created by Dennis O'Neil and Dick Dillin in 1975.

When Green Martians are looking for a new home world, they accidentally release an imprisoned giant alien named Korge who refers to himself as the God of Rage. He has the ability to fight superhumans with their weaknesses, like turning yellow when confronting Green Lantern, creating kryptonite when facing Superman, and creating fire against the Martians.

== Vasily Kosov ==
Vasily Kosov was the leader of the Odessa Mob in Gotham City in the aftermath of No Man's Land.

=== Vasily Kosov in other media ===
Vasily Kosov appears in The Penguin, portrayed by David Vadim. This version worked for Oz Cobb before he is killed by his second-in-command.

== Konstantin Kovar ==
Konstantin Kovar is an archaeologist and father of Leonid Kovar. Together, they investigated a spaceship that crashed into the Yenisei River until it exploded.

=== Konstantin Kovar in other media ===
- Konstantin Kovar appears in flashbacks depicted in the fifth season of Arrow, portrayed by Dolph Lundgren. This version is a Russian criminal and dictator of a Russian village who seeks to overthrow the Russian government and return Russia to its former glory. In pursuit of this goal, he purchases sarin gas from Malcolm Merlyn and uses it to kill several members of the Russian government and military, but is thwarted by Oliver Queen, Anatoly Knyazev, and members of the Bratva. In retaliation, Kovar captures Queen and injects him with the "Red Star" drug to make him relieve his worst memories, though Queen eventually kills him.
- Konstantin Kovar appears in the Titans episode "Titans", portrayed by Mark Krupa. This version is a gangster based in Vienna, Austria who is later killed by Starfire.

== Kristen Kramer ==
Kristen Kramer is an intern at the Central City Police Department and colleague of the Flash. In the DC Rebirth continuity, Kristen's parents were killed in a car accident and her sister Kim later committed suicide. Years later, Kristen became a full crime scene investigator.

=== Kristen Kramer in other media ===
Kristen Kramer appears in The Flash, portrayed by Carmen Moore. This version is a Native American of Wet'suwet'en descent, a liaison for the Governor's Municipal Logistics Commission, and a metahuman capable of temporarily copying other nearby metahumans' powers. She initially pushes for the creation of meta-cure bullets while attempting to arrest Killer Frost before Joe West helps her locate Adam Creyke, her metahuman brother who betrayed and ambushed their military platoon, for which she blamed herself for and formed a mistrust towards metahumans who claim to be doing good. After discovering her abilities, Kramer assists Barry Allen and Team Flash against various supervillains.

== Kritter ==
Kritter is among the children who were experimented on by Doctor Love while they were still in their mother's womb, giving him the appearance of a humanoid dog. Love raised the six children in isolation until they learned of their origins, upon which they killed Love and struck out on their own as the group Helix. Kritter is incapable of speech and uses a collar-like translator to allow him to speak.

=== Kritter in other media ===
- Kritter appears in the Stargirl episode "Frenemies – Chapter Eight: Infinity Inc. Part Two". This version is a normal dog and companion of Tao Jones, a resident of the Helix Institute for Youth Rehabilitation.
- Kritter appears as a character summon in Scribblenauts Unmasked: A DC Comics Adventure.

== Krull ==
Krull is a character appearing in American comic books published by DC Comics. He first appeared in All-Star Superman #3 and was created by Grant Morrison and Frank Quitely.

Krull is a member of a race of underground dinosauroid-like creatures called Subterranosauri and is the son of the Dino-Czar Tyrannko. He leads an invasion of Metropolis, but is defeated by Superman, Atlas, and Samson.

=== Krull in other media ===
- Krull appears in the My Adventures with Superman episode "Guess Who's Slammin' to Dinner", voiced by Darrell Brown.
- Krull appears in All-Star Superman, voiced by Fred Tatasciore.

== Kryptonite Man ==
Kryptonite Man is the name of several supervillains appearing in stories published by DC Comics.

=== First Kryptonite Man ===
The original Kryptonite Man started out as a teenage alien criminal called the Kryptonite Kid. On the planet Blor, he faced a 20-year sentence, he volunteered for a scientific experiment, a satellite that required a test passenger. He favored dying in deep space to rotting in jail, with the added bonus of a 10,000 to 1 chance of surviving the test. He was loaded in the satellite together with a laboratory dog, and the satellite was shot into deep space, never to return. To pass the time, they watched a telescopic viewer of Earth and learned of Superboy's existence. On their course for Earth, they passed through a cloud of gaseous Green Kryptonite, which gave him and his dog Kryptonite-based powers.

=== Alien version ===
A second Kryptonite Man appeared in Superman #397. He was the ruler of a race of humanoids who inhabited Krypton eons before Superman's ancestors. When a nearby cosmic body threatens life on Krypton, Kryptonite Man sends his people into stasis underground. He awakens on the day of Krypton's destruction, during which the mountain he is in is launched into space. He survives by feeding on Green Kryptonite radiation, becoming dependent on it to survive.

=== Superman clone ===
In post-Crisis continuity, the Kryptonite Man is a green-skinned clone of Superman created by Simyan and Mokkari. He fought Superman until he was accidentally disintegrated by his creators.

=== Captain Atom creation ===
A character in the ongoing series Superman/Batman also uses the name Kryptonite Man. This version of the character is created when Captain Atom absorbed the explosive energy from Major Force, then went out to destroy a Kryptonite meteor. The energy from the meteor combines with the remaining energy in Captain Atom to create a sentient energy force.

=== K. Russell Abernathy ===
After DC Comics' "One Year Later" jump, a scientist named K. Russell Abernathy was working on an experiment to use Green Kryptonite to develop a new energy source using isotopes. The experiment explodes, infusing Abernathy's body with radiation. A powerless Clark Kent summons Supergirl to contain him. The transformed Abernathy, in a misguided attempt to prove his energy theories, goes on a violent rampage. This includes deliberately attempting to injure Kryptonians. He is soon subdued and imprisoned in Stryker's Island.

In 2011, "The New 52" rebooted the DC universe. K. Russell Abernathy was a scientist who was behind Project K-Man. He and his fellow scientists used a modified linear system to infuse Clay Ramsay with Green Kryptonite.

=== Clay Ramsay ===
In September 2011, The New 52 rebooted DC's continuity. In this new timeline, Kryptonite Man is reintroduced in Action Comics #5, by Grant Morrison and Andy Kubert. His origin is told in Action Comics (vol. 2) Annual #1 (2012) (penned by Sholly Fisch).

In this origin, Clay Ramsay was an abusive husband living in Metropolis. One night, Superman broke into his house while he was beating his wife and threw him into Hob's Bay. His wife subsequently left him and no one in the justice system could help him. Seeking revenge, he joined the mysterious "Project K-Man" (a private super-soldier project) after receiving an invitation from Dr. Abernathy (a nod to the pre-New 52 version of the character). Gaining superhuman powers from an experiment with Green Kryptonite, he attacked Superman but was defeated and arrested. He was released shortly afterwards by Sam Lane who believed he was needed as a countermeasure to keep Superman in check. K-Man agreed under the condition that Lane would help him locate his wife.

Ramsay later died from the side effects of the Kryptonite radiation and was buried at Stryker's Island.

=== Other versions of Kryptonite Man ===
- Kryptonite Kid appears in the non-canon story Superman: Whatever Happened to the Man of Tomorrow?, where he is depicted as older and uses the name Kryptonite Man.
- In the Elseworlds storyline Superman: The Last Family of Krypton, Kryptonite Man is Bru-El, the son of Jor-El and Lara, who was manipulated by Lex Luthor.

=== Kryptonite Man in other media ===
- The Kryptonite Kid appears in a self-titled episode of Superboy, portrayed by Jay Underwood. This version is Mike Walker, an employee at a military research base who was caught in a Kryptonite explosion while trying to find a way to make Superboy immune to it, giving him the ability to generate Kryptonite, turning his skin green, and affecting his mind. Superboy ultimately defeats him by enlisting a Superboy impersonator to distract Walker, allowing Superboy to wrap him in a lead tarp that cleanses the Kryptonite from his body.
- The original Kryptonite Man appears as a character summon in Scribblenauts Unmasked: A DC Comics Adventure.

== Kulak ==
- Further reading: Kulak at the Comic Book DB (archived from the original); Kulak at the Grand Comics Database

Kulak is a sorcerer and supervillain in the DC Universe. The character was created by Jerry Siegel and Bernard Baily and first appeared in All Star Comics #2 (Fall 1940).

Kulak is the high priest of the dead planet Brztal who was imprisoned on Earth in antiquity. When released by archeologists in 1940, he seeks to destroy Earth, but is defeated by the Spectre.

The character was not used again until 1983, when he appears in a three-part story published in All-Star Squadron, and has rarely been used since.

== Kyodai Ken ==
Kyodai Ken ((巨大剣) – literally "the huge sword" or "the gigantic sword") is a character appearing in DC Comics. He was first seen in the DCAU, but later crossed over into the mainstream comics. He is a ninja trained under Sensei, who also trained deadly martial artists like Bronze Tiger, Batman, and Lady Shiva, and was a temporary enemy of Batman.

=== Batman: The Animated Series history ===
First appearing in the Batman: The Animated Series episode "Night of the Ninja" voiced by Robert Ito, Kyodai Ken is an amoral ninja and enemy of Batman who previously trained alongside him. Throughout his appearances, he battles Batman. While he captured Bruce Wayne in "Night of the Ninja", Robin managed to rescue Bruce as Kyodai Ken escapes into the water. In "Day of the Samurai", Kyodai Ken has his final battle with Batman, during which he is killed in a volcanic eruption.

=== Mainstream comics history ===
In Detective Comics #996, he appeared in a hallucination alongside his master Kirigi attacking a "giant bat".
