= Trogg =

Trogg can refer to:

- The Troggs, an English rock band
- Trogg, a DC Comics character
