= Squid (comics) =

Squid in comics may refer to:

- Squid (Marvel Comics) - a number of Marvel Comics supervillains
- Squid (DC Comics) - two different villains in DC Comics
