= List of DC Comics characters: P =

== Paintball ==
Paintball (Paul Deisinger) is a DC Comics supervillain. He first appeared in Stars and S.T.R.I.P.E. #2 (September 1999), and was created by Geoff Johns and Leo Moder.

Paintball is an art teacher who was transformed into a paint-themed criminal and became a minion of Dragon King.

=== Paintball in other media ===
Paul Deisinger appears in Stargirl, portrayed by Randy Havens. This version is an art teacher at Blue Valley High School who was transformed into a paint monster by Cindy Burman and Eclipso. After Stargirl frees and cures him, Deisinger undergoes a psych evaluation before being killed by Icicle's mother Lily Mahkent.

== Papercut ==
Papercut (Benedict Booker) is a criminal who can manipulate wood, but has a harder time manipulating actual wood than things made of wood, like paper. Any attempts at manipulating actual wood can give him a nosebleed. He went on a crime spree where he tried to rob people in the park, only to be defeated by Kid Flash.

Papercut is among the Flash villains recruited by Professor Zoom to join the Legion of Zoom.

== Linda Park ==
Linda Park (also known as Linda Park-West) is a character in the DC Universe. She is best known as the girlfriend and later wife of Wally West. Linda Park first appeared in The Flash (vol. 2) #28 and was created by William Messner-Loebs.

She is a Korean-American television reporter for Keystone City and regularly deals with the Flash, whom she does not like. During their initial meeting she constantly hounds the Flash about the property damage caused by his battle with the Porcupine Man. Despite this, Linda and Wally become friends while investigating the Celestial Enlightenment Ranch, a spiritual-retreat scam. After Wally helps Linda deal with her apparent possession by the ancient Irish bard Seamus O’Relkig, they become close and later marry.

Linda later retires from journalism and has twin children: Jai and Iris.

=== Linda Park in other media ===
- Linda Park makes a cameo appearance in the pilot episode of The Flash (1990), portrayed by Mariko Tse. This version is a Central City reporter.
- Linda Park appears in the Justice League Unlimited episode "Flash and Substance", voiced by Kim Mai Guest.
- Two versions of Linda Park appear in TV series set in the Arrowverse, portrayed initially by Olivia Cheng in Arrow and later by Malese Jow in The Flash.
  - The Earth-1 version is a Central City reporter who enters a relationship with Barry Allen before they eventually break up.
  - Her Earth-2 counterpart, Doctor Light, appears in the second season of The Flash.

== Douglas Parker ==
Chief Douglas Parker is a supporting character in stories published by DC Comics featuring Superboy, the younger version of Superman. The character first appeared in Adventure Comics #225 (June 1956) and was created by Alvin Schwartz and Curt Swan.

Encountering a young Clark Kent as a rookie cop, Parker would become an ally to the young hero as he climbed the ranks of the police force.

=== Douglas Parker in other media ===
Chief Parker appears in The Adventures of Superboy, portrayed by Robert Williams.

== Jarrett Parker ==
Dr. Jarrett Parker is a character appearing in American comic books published by DC Comics. He was created in The Flash (vol. 2) #10, and was created by Mike Baron and Mike Collins.

He was a therapist who practiced in Huntington, New York, and a colleague of Dr. Owen Slade.

One of his patients was Chunk. After swallowing a matter transmitter and becoming a human singularity, Chunk became frustrated with Parker and sent him to another dimension. Here, Parker helped establish a community with others who suffered the same fate, including Karin Preus and Eric Gunderson. Parker's counsel remained ineffective on Chunk, and Chunk's frustration with this caused him to be absorbed into a separate dimension.

=== Jarrett Parker in other media ===
Dr. Jarrett Parker appears in the seventh season of Arrow, portrayed by Jason E. Kelley. This version is the corrupt chief psychiatrist of Slabside Maximum Security Prison who utilizes unethical and lethal methods to rehabilitate criminals. After Oliver Queen and Talia al Ghul discover and expose his corruption, Parker is subsequently fired from Slabside and killed by Talia.

== Peacekeeper ==
Peacekeeper is a character in the DC Universe. The character was created by Paul Jenkins and Jack Herbert, and first appeared in Future State: The Next Batman #1 (March 2021).

The Peacekeepers are a task force led by Sean Mahoney (Peacekeeper-01) and created by the Magistrate. During the Fear State crossover, Scarecrow doses Mahoney with fear toxin, causing him to go rogue and murder his black ops counterpart Peacekeeper-X (a young man named Ricardo). After Scarecrow "evolves" his Magistrate nanotechnology, altering his brain, Mahoney shoots Scarecrow and attempts to kill and replace Batman as Gotham City's protector.

== Jillian Pearlman ==
Captain Jillian "Cowgirl" Pearlman, USAF, was created by writer Geoff Johns and artist Carlos Pacheco as a rival to Carol Ferris for the romantic affections of Hal Jordan. Jillian Pearlman first appeared in Green Lantern vol. 4 #1 (May 2005), and was created by Geoff Johns and Carlos Pacheco.

The fourth child of a Texan rancher, Jillian enlists in the United States Air Force after she turns nineteen. Her sharp wit, attitude, and Texan accent earn her the call sign "Cowgirl". Jillian meets Hal Jordan's alter-ego, Green Lantern, after he saves her from a plane crash, and the two soon fall in love. During the lost year, Cowgirl, Jordan, and Shane Sellers are captured by terrorists. After escaping, the three return to active duty and are instructed to undergo therapy, but refuse. When the Star Sapphire gem resurfaces, it attacks Cowgirl and converts her into a Star Sapphire before Jordan frees her. Following The New 52 continuity reboot, Cowgirl is reintroduced in DC Retroactive, a collection of independent stories set in the 1970s, 1980s, and 1990s.

== Peek-a-Boo ==
Peek-a-Boo (Lashawn Baez) is a DC Comics supervillain. She first appeared in The Flash (vol. 2) #180 (January 2002), and was created by Geoff Johns and Scott Kolins.

Lashawn Baez was a graduate student at Central City Medical School, but put her studies aside to help her father Tomas when he got ill, requiring a kidney transplant. Lashawn tried to donate hers, but the procedure activated her latent metagene, granting her uncontrollable teleportation powers. When Gorilla Grodd attacks Iron Heights, Peek-a-Boo escapes along with many other villains. She goes to the hospital to check on her father, only to learn that he had died after rejecting a kidney transplant. When the Flash came to the hospital, Lashawn, in grief and embittered by her incarceration, revealed to him that she wanted to be a hero like him whom she had idolized, but now considered him as an enemy. Lashawn allows herself to be arrested, believing that she has nothing left to live for.

=== Peek-a-Boo in other media ===
- Peek-a-Boo, renamed Shawna Baez, appears in The Flash, portrayed by Britne Oldford. This version acquired her powers after being exposed to dark matter from S.T.A.R. Labs' particle accelerator.
  - Shawna Baez / Peek-a-Boo appears in the web series Chronicles of Cisco: Entry 0419, portrayed again by Oldford.

== Penny Dreadful ==
Penny Dreadful is among the children who were experimented on by Doctor Love while they were still in their mother's womb, giving her the ability to channel and manipulate electricity. Love raised the six children in isolation until they learned of their origins, upon which they killed Love and struck out on their own as the group Helix. During her time in Helix, Penny becomes close to Mister Bones; when she is separated from the rest of Helix, Penny becomes Bones's secretary for a time before returning to crime.

=== Penny Dreadful in other media ===
- Penny Dreadful appears as a character summon in Scribblenauts Unmasked: A DC Comics Adventure.
- Penny Dreadful appears in the Stargirl episode "Frenemies – Chapter Eight: Infinity Inc. Part Two", portrayed by Megan Ashley Brown. This version is a patient at the Helix Institute for Youth Rehabilitation.

== Julia Pennyworth ==
Julia Pennyworth is a character appearing in American comic books published by DC Comics. Created by Gerry Conway and Don Newton, she first appeared in Detective Comics #501 (April 1981).

Julia Pennyworth is the daughter of Alfred Pennyworth and Mademoiselle Marie. She was raised by Marie's friend, Jacques Remarque, due to Marie being too busy to properly raise her.

In The New 52 continuity, Julia is depicted as an agent of the Special Reconnaissance Regiment. This version of her character persisted into the DC Rebirth relaunch, during which she became an ally of Batwoman. She later attempted to avenge her father's murder at the hands of Bane.

=== Julia Pennyworth in other media ===
- Julia Pennyworth appears in Batwoman, portrayed by Christina Wolfe.
- Julia Pennyworth appears in Catwoman: Hunted, voiced by Lauren Cohan.

== Neptune Perkins ==
- First appearance: Flash Comics #66 (August 1945)
- Created by: Gardner Fox and Joe Kubert
- Teams: All-Star Squadron; Young All-Stars
- Abilities: Enhanced ocean-adapted physiology, ability to communicate with marine mammals
- Further reading: Neptune Perkins at the Comic Book DB (archived from the original); Neptune Perkins at the Grand Comics Database

Neptune Perkins is a superhero in the DC Universe.

The character, created by Gardner Fox and Joe Kubert, first appeared in Flash Comics #66 (August 1945). That and a follow-up story in 1947 were the character's only appearances, until Roy Thomas revived him for an All-Star Squadron story in 1984 and later selected him as one of the focal characters of Young All-Stars in 1987. In addition, Thomas expanded the character's backstory and origin so that it incorporated large chunks of The Narrative of Arthur Gordon Pym of Nantucket by Edgar Allan Poe and Twenty Thousand Leagues Under the Seas by Jules Verne.

Neptune Perkins is a mutant born with attributes that lend themselves to living at sea. During World War II, he works with the All-Star Squadron. After the war he weds Miya Shimada, though this relationship becomes strained in part by his being unaware that he is not the father of their daughter, Debbie. In later appearances, he works as a governmental contact for Aquaman and Young Justice after being elected to the United States Senate and serves as a member of Old Justice. He is killed by Shark and King Shark during the Infinite Crisis event.

== Perpetua ==
Perpetua is a character appearing in media published by DC Comics. She was created by writer James Tynion IV and artist Mikel Janín, and first appeared in Justice League (vol. 4) #8 (November 2018).

Perpetua is a sixth-dimensional being, the creator of the multiverse, and the mother of the Monitor, Anti-Monitor, and World Forger, who respectively guard the positive, anti-matter, and dark matter realms. After rebelling against her people, she is defeated and imprisoned in the Source Wall. However, Perpetua's powers enable her to influence the minds of others, causing various Crisis-level events over the years.

During the Dark Nights: Death Metal storyline, Perpetua is freed after the World Forger's servant Barbatos and the Batman Who Laughs destroy the Source Wall. However, the Batman Who Laughs betrays Perpetua and re-imprisons her.

== Phantasm ==
Phantasm is the name of several characters appearing in American comic books published by DC Comics.

=== First version ===
The first version is a ghostly supervillain who fought Chris King and Vicki Grant. He was created by Robby Reed's Master form and is a member of the Evil Eight.

== Pistolera ==
Pistolera is a character appearing in American comic books published by DC Comics.

An unnamed woman first operated as Gunbunny when she and Gunhawk were contracted to kill somebody only to run afoul of the Jean-Paul Valley version of Batman. She got wounded during the fight and was taken to the hospital while Gunhawk was apprehended by Batman.

Gunbunny later took on the name of Pistolera when she worked for the Ravens.

During the "Infinite Crisis" storyline, Pistolera appears as a member of Alexander Luthor Jr.'s Secret Society of Super Villains. She is later killed by Deadshot of Secret Six.

== Molly Pitcher ==
Molly Pitcher is a character appearing in American comic books published by DC Comics.

Introduced in "The New Golden Age" event, Molly Preacher is a school girl and friend of Betsy Ross. After seeing Miss America in action when their school was saved, they took on the costumed identities of Betsy Ross and Molly Pitcher to help her against a saboteur named Moth. Molly received a pitcher that was associated with Betsy Ross and can summon a variety of tools and cause flash floods. Pitcher and Ross served as Miss America's sidekicks until the end of World War II, when they mysteriously vanished. By the events of "Flashpoint Beyond", Pitcher was among the thirteen missing Golden Age superheroes in the Time Masters' capsules. When those capsules have failed, they were all pulled back to their own time with history rebuilding around them. The two are later rescued by Stargirl and brought to the present day by Hourman.

== Plunder ==
Plunder is a character appearing in American comic books published by DC Comics, created by Geoff Johns and Angel Unzueta.

He is a twisted alternate counterpart of Jared Morillo who worked as an assassin.

=== Plunder in other media ===
Plunder appears in The Flash episode "The Present", portrayed by Stephen Huszar. This version is a jewel thief who uses a futuristic gun.

== Derek Powers ==
Derek Powers, also called Blight, is a supervillain who appears in the Batman Beyond (1999–2001) animated series, voiced by Sherman Howard. He served as the primary antagonist of the series' first season.

Derek Powers is a corrupt businessman who gains control over Wayne Enterprises after merging with his own company Powers Technology as Wayne-Powers after Bruce Wayne retires. He is the one who inadvertently sets the young man Terry McGinnis on the path to being Batman. Powers had developed a lethal mutagenic nerve gas and intends to sell it as a weapon. One of his employees, Terry's father Warren, obtains evidence concerning this plan, for which Mr. Fixx, Powers’ right-hand, kills him. With this knowledge, Terry steals the futuristic Batsuit as Batman to stop Powers' plans. During their battle, Powers is exposed to the gas and subjects himself to radiation treatments to save his life, which interacts with the gas and causes his body to become radioactive and translucent. Powers contains his radiation with artificial skins that disintegrate over time. Eventually, he retires from leading his company to focus on finding a cure, appointing his estranged son Paxton as his replacement. However, Paxton betrays his father by publicly exposing his condition. Powers hides in an abandoned nuclear submarine and is presumed dead after battling Batman.

=== In comic books ===
Blight makes his only appearance after his apparent death in Batman Beyond #18. Powers survives the submarine explosion and swims to shore, only to become the new target of the hunter Stalker. After injecting Batman with a non-lethal poison, Stalker attempts to use him as bait to lure out Blight, who had gone into hiding. Blight has by now gone completely insane and forgotten his original identity as Derek Powers. After a long fight in a steel mill, Blight is engulfed in melted steel and apparently killed.

Blight returns in the "Industrial Revolution", where he has regained his memories and begins using a containment suit to contain his radiation. He anonymously arranges for his son Paxton to be released from prison, then sets a trap for him in a former Wayne-Powers facility. Blight apparently gets his revenge when the facility is engulfed by an explosion with Paxton and Batman with it, only to find out later that Paxton escaped. Although Batman is almost killed, he manages to escape by puncturing Blight's suit, forcing him to back off. Batman confronts Blight again when he attacks Wayne Manor. He uses the control module on the back of Blight's suit to overload its settings, reducing him to radioactive slime.

A young Derek Powers appears in the Task Force Z series.

=== Derek Powers in other media ===
- Blight appears as a character summon in Scribblenauts Unmasked: A DC Comics Adventure.
- Blight appears as a playable character in Lego Batman 3: Beyond Gotham as part of the "Batman Beyond" DLC pack.

== Pozhar ==
List of DC Comics Characters

Publication information
- Publisher: DC Comics
- Created by: John Ostrander (writer); Joe Brozowski (artist)

In-story information
- Species: Metahuman
- Abilities: Superhuman strength, endurance, speed, durability and self-sustenance; Quark vision; Flight; Elemental manipulation; Density manipulation; Regenerative healing factor; Matter manipulation; Nucleokinesis/Radiokinesis; Energy absorption; Matrix memory recall
Firestorm
Publication information
- Genre: Superhero
- Publication date: August 1987 – 2012
- Main character: Mikhail Denisovitch Arkadin

Pozhar (Пожар or "Fire") is a Russian superhero in the DC Universe. The character, created by John Ostrander and Joe Brozowski, first appeared in The Fury of Firestorm (vol. 2) #62 (August 1987). Within the stories' context, Mikhail Arkadin is a nuclear technician who worked at the Chernobyl Nuclear Power Plant. During the meltdown that occurred there, Arkadin's metagene was activated and he gained the ability to convert matter into energy. He was subsequently recruited by Major Zastrow of the Red Shadow as one of the Soviet Union's official superheroes. However, he is forced to wear a containment suit to prevent himself from destroying everything he touches.

In 1986, John Ostrander became the writer of the Firestorm title following Gerry Conway's departure from DC Comics. His first major story arc pitted Firestorm (Ronnie Raymond) against the world, as the hero (acting on a suggestion from a terminally ill Martin Stein) demands that the U.S. and the Soviet Union destroy all of their nuclear weapons. After tussles with the Justice League and most of his enemies, Firestorm faces off against Pozhar in the Nevada desert, where both have an atomic bomb dropped on them. The two are fused into a new Firestorm controlled by the disembodied, amnesiac mind of Martin Stein.

It is later revealed that Firestorm is a fire elemental and that Stein had originally been intended to be the fire elemental by himself: the inclusion of others in the Firestorm entity, such as Raymond and Arkadin, had been accidental. Stein becomes the sole Firestorm and leaves Earth, leaving Raymond and Arkadin powerless.

In "The New 52" reboot, Arkadin helped Stein create the Firestorm Protocols.

In Doomsday Clock, Pozhar appears as a member of the People's Heroes and closes Russia's borders to all foreigners, be they metahuman or not.

=== Pozhar in other media ===
Mikhail Arkadin appears in Legends of Tomorrow, portrayed by Voytek Skrzeta. This version is a prison guard from 1986.

== Preus ==
Preus is a supervillain who first appeared in The Adventures of Superman #625 (April 2004) and was created by Joe Kelly and Talent Caldwell as part of their "Godfall" arc.

For years, Preus had proudly served the Citizen's Patrol Corps, a police force that kept the peace in Kandor under the Kryptonian banner of El, their "creator". Due to the compression of time, more than a century had passed inside the bottle city (compared to only a handful of years outside it) during which Preus and his fellow Kandorians had come to worship "The Superman" as their "god in heaven" above. The Corpsman was also a devout xenophobe, who dispensed justice against "non-K" (Kryptonian) dissidents that threatened their way of life, especially a citizen named Kal-El, who tainted Paradise when he seemingly murdered several Kandorians.

Preus swore a solemn oath to make the murderer pay, not realizing that Kal-El was the Superman that he and the others had worshiped for so long. He was also unaware that the "victims" were constructs created by an alien telepath, Lyla, who had brainwashed Kal-El into believing that Kandor was a never-exploded Krypton. Eventually shattering the illusion, Superman escaped Kandor and confronted Lyla back in Metropolis. Preus followed them, but exposure to Earth's air and yellow sun drastically affected him, giving him strange, new powers equal to Superman's while amplifying his already-unbalanced racist views.

Convinced that Kal-El had defiled the legacy of "The Superman", Preus swore to assume that responsibility himself and that all of the impure would die by his hand. His xenophobia led him to a group of white supremacists in the American desert, who he forced into worshiping him and his views. However, in time, the people of "God's Peake" (as the camp was called) came to worship Preus as their cult leader. His increasing prominence eventually led both the Martian Manhunter and Jimmy Olsen to investigate, only to have both of them captured by Preus and his men.

This forced a confrontation with Superman, who, at the time, was dealing with the effects of Gog's synthetic yellow kryptonite, which had significantly aged and weakened Superman in a short period of time. So weakened, Superman was barely able to deal with Preus' legions alone and quickly found himself outclassed by Preus.

A last-ditch gambit using kryptonite to try and weaken Preus failed, as Preus revealed a previously unknown resistance to kryptonite. He was finally defeated when Superman attacked and destroyed a key portion of Preus' armor, rendering him unconscious. Afterwards, Preus was injured from that attack and had to be hospitalized. His current whereabouts are unknown. He was last seen as a weakened Superman tried to fly him to S.T.A.R. Labs for treatment. Preus disappeared after Superman was engaged by an army of Gogs.

=== Powers and abilities ===
Preus possesses powers similar to those of Superman, such as superhuman strength and speed, flight, invulnerability, X-ray vision and enhanced senses. Preus can generate fiery black energy from his eyes and is immune to kryptonite.

=== Preus in other media ===
Preus appears in Krypton, portrayed by Ciaran Owens. This version is a Sagitari commander on the moon Wegthor.

== Prince Ra-Man ==
Prince Ra-Man (aka Mark Merlin) is a fictional comic book magician published by DC Comics. Mark Merlin first appeared in House of Secrets #23 (August 1959), and was created by Mort Meskin. Prince Ra-Man first appeared in House of Secrets #73 (July 1965), and was created by Jack Miller and Bernard Baily.

Mark Merlin is a detective who uses his vast collection of occult literature and artifacts to battle those who would use the occult for evil ends with the assistance of his secretary/fiancee Elsa Magusson and his black cat Memakata, whose body he can transfer his mind into with the help of an ancient cat-headed amulet. Merlin is later banished to the other-dimensional lost world of Ra by the villain Gargoyle. Unable to return to Earth in his own body, Merlin is reincarnated in the body of Prince Ra-Man, a long-dead wizard originating from the Ra-Realm. The reborn Ra-Man defeats the Gargoyle with his "mental beam", which gives him the ability to control non-living matter.

The "Whatever Happened To Mark Merlin and Prince Ra-Man" backup story in DC Comics Presents #32 (April 1981) has Ra-Man reveal his full origin and true connection with Merlin to Elsa Magusson. Prince Ra-Man was killed in the last issue of Crisis on Infinite Earths and has made scattered appearances since then.

== Professor Ojo ==
Professor Ojo is a supervillain appearing in American comic books published by DC Comics. The son of an assistant in an early atomic energy facility, whose poor safety standards exposed workers to massive doses of radiation, Ojo is born without eyes. He creates a device allowing him to see and eventually becomes an associate of the League of Assassins.

Ojo steals an experimental atomic submarine, bringing him into conflict with Richard Dragon and Benjamin Turner. Although Dragon and Turner help recover the stolen submarine, Turner stays behind to confront Ojo, who previously killed his lover. Ojo captures and brainwashes Turner, turning him into the assassin known as the Bronze Tiger.

=== Professor Ojo in other media ===
Professor Ojo appears in Young Justice, voiced by Nolan North.

== Protector ==
The Protector (Jason Hart) is a superhero appearing in media published by DC Comics, primarily as an ally of the Teen Titans. He first appeared in The New Teen Titans anti-drug comic specials, and was created by Marv Wolfman and George Pérez. The Protector was created for Keebler's anti-drug campaign as a replacement for Robin, who was licensed by Nabisco and thus unavailable.

Jason Hart is a high school student and an expert in sports who becomes a vigilante to save his younger cousin Ted from his drug addiction and stop the men who had been supplying him drugs. Nightwing trains Jason in combat and makes him an honorary member of the Teen Titans.

The Protector makes minor appearances in Titans: Secret Files, Infinite Crisis, and Heroes in Crisis. In Heroes in Crisis, Protector is killed in a Speed Force explosion; he is later revealed to have survived.

=== Protector in other media ===
The Protector appears in Teen Titans Go! as an alternate alias of Robby Reed after his H-Dial borrows Robin's abilities.

== Psiphon ==
Psiphon is a character appearing in American comic books published by DC Comics, introduced in The New 52.

In September 2011, The New 52 rebooted DC's continuity. In this new timeline, Psiphon is introduced to DC as a member of H.I.V.E. and partner of Dreadnought. He appears in Superboy (vol. 6) #20, where the team are dispatched to New York City to capture Doctor Psycho, who had escaped from a H.I.V.E. facility, and Superboy, whose psionic powers were of interest to H.I.V.E. Despite proving to be formidable opponents, both Psiphon and the Dreadnought were defeated when Psycho and Superboy teamed up to take them down. Psiphon was knocked out by Superboy with just a flick of his finger.

== Psych ==
Psych is the name of several characters appearing in American comic books published by DC Comics.

=== Wanderers member ===
An unidentified female with empathy is a member of the Wanderers. When a space cloud turns the Wanderers evil, they battle the Legion of Super-Heroes before being defeated by Bouncing Boy.

=== Knight Shift member ===
An unidentified female with mental powers is a member of Knight Shift. They went up against the Legion of Super-Heroes.

=== Bashir ===
Bashir is an information broker who wields the Sage Force which grants him telekinesis and telepathy. The character was created by Joshua Williamson and Rafa Sandoval, and first appeared in The Flash (vol. 5) #61 (March 2019). Bashir sells out the Flash in Zandia while looking to dismantle Roulette's criminal empire in order for him to steal information before being double crossed by Gemini. Bashir later manipulates Steadfast and Fuerza against each other before being killed by the Black Flash.

=== Psych in other media ===
The Bashir incarnation of Psych, fully named as Bashir Malik, appears in The Flash, portrayed by Ennis Esmer. This version is a psychic who is immune to mental inhibitors, and has a connection with Cecile Horton. He recklessly uses his abilities until deciding to help Barry Allen, Fuerza and Deon Owens subdue the Speed Force and restore balance.

== Pteradon ==
Pteradon (Israel Harel) is a fighter IDF paratrooper who was shot by a thought-to-be-dead terrorist and fell into the ocean. Mento saved his life and transformed into a Pteranodon-like creature called Pteradon, who joined the Hybrid.

Pteradon appears in the "Doomsday Clock" storyline as a member of the Hayoth.

== Punch and Jewelee ==
Punch and Jewelee are a fictional duo appearing in American comic books published by DC Comics. The characters first appeared in Captain Atom #85 (March 1967), and were created by Steve Ditko.

Clyde Phillips and an unidentified woman are considered two silly criminals and clowns by most superheroes who do not take them seriously, but they are completely amoral individuals who act on whim as on any other motivation which makes them quite unpredictable and dangerous. They grew up together in Brooklyn and went into business as puppeteers at Coney Island, moonlighting as thieves. They found a small box with alien weaponry left behind by careless extraterrestrials. They quickly learned how to use these weapons. The couple decided to adapt the characters of Punch and Judy to themselves. The couple originally battled Captain Atom and Nightshade in the original stories prior to the Crisis on Infinite Earths storyline.

Punch and Jewelee were recruited for Amanda Waller's Suicide Squad team of "expendable" super-operatives (such as Bronze Tiger and Harley Quinn) until impending parenthood led the couple to agree to leave and settle down in suburbia. During the One Year Later storyline, they work with other villains (such as Icicle, Javelin and Plastique) in a plan to travel to Myanmar to capture a sentient energy source through Mirror Master's mirrors, but Punch is killed by guards.

In the DC Rebirth continuity, the couple are recruited by Batman after Jewelee is an inmate in Arkham Asylum and has been in a near-catatonic state and Punch had stolen the identity of James Gordon after having been held captive by Bane.

=== Abilities of Punch and Jewelee ===
Punch wears boots that allow him to walk on air (much like the Trickster's air shoes), wields an alien gun that generates "sting strings", and various beams of light that can cause bodily harm or control the actions of others. Punch uses the gun as a puppeteer, manipulating his victims. This weapon has an inexhaustible power supply.

Jewelee carries a set of jewels that contain different properties. One is a "hypno jewel" that can create convincing illusions and light effects while another is capable of generating energy and force blasts.

=== Punch and Jewelee in other media ===
- Punch and Jewelee appear in the Batman: The Brave and the Bold episode "Menace of the Conqueror Caveman!", respectively voiced by Diedrich Bader and Jane Singer.
- Punch and Jewelee appear in Suicide Squad: Hell to Pay, respectively voiced by Trevor Devall and Julie Nathanson.

== Punchline ==
Debuting shortly before the "Joker War" story arc, Alexis Kaye is a college student who develops an unhealthy obsession with the Joker, after encountering him during an ill-fated high school trip. Facing the death penalty for the crimes she committed recently, Kaye pleads not guilty. Being released from jail, she develops a plot to become the Joker's new sidekick and girlfriend.

In 2022, the character was given a limited series, titled Punchline: The Gotham Game, in which she moves on from The Joker and becomes the new leader of Gotham's Royal Flush Gang. The title ran for six issues, and was written by Tini Howard, with art provided by Blake Howard and Gleb Melnikov.

In the "Knight Terrors" story arc, Punchline and the Royal Flush Gang attempt to break into the supposedly abandoned Clock Tower that was used by the Bat Family. With a large number of heroes in the Knightmare Realm, she believes that the process will be an easy task before coming face-to-face with her deepest fear.

== Puppeteer ==
- First appearance: Green Lantern (vol. 2) #1 (August 1960)
- Created by: John Broome, Gil Kane
- Abilities: "Hypno-ray" device that allows mind control
- Aliases: Jordan Weir

The Puppeteer, originally known as the Puppet Master, is a DC Comics supervillain. Jordan Weir was a scientist who created a "hypno-ray" which he could use to force his victims to obey his commands. As the Puppet Master, he embarked on a crime spree, manipulating minor criminals into doing his dirty work.

After being defeated by Green Lantern, he started a new life as a scientist for Dayton Industries. However, when the company developed the self-generating power source known as Promethium, the temptation was too much for him. Through his robot puppets, the Puppeteer took control of Cyborg, Kid Flash, Starfire, and Wonder Girl and turned them against their teammates. Raven's soul-self was finally able to break their trance and the Titans united to battle the Puppeteer and his toy robotic army. When the villain was defeated, H.I.V.E. attempted to destroy him for his failure, but the Puppeteer escaped.

=== Puppeteer in other media ===
- A character loosely inspired by the Puppet Master called the Dollman (not to be confused with Doll Man) appears in The Adventures of Batman episode "Beware of Living Dolls".
- A character inspired by the Puppeteer called the Puppet King appears in Teen Titans, voiced by Tracey Walter.
- The Puppeteer makes non-speaking background appearances in Justice League Unlimited as a member of Gorilla Grodd's Secret Society.
- The Puppeteer appears as a character summon in Scribblenauts Unmasked: A DC Comics Adventure.

== Purgatory ==
Purgatory is a supervillain in DC Comics.

Paul Christian is a man who lost his legs in a subway accident. Years later, Green Lantern (Kyle Rayner) used his ring to create prosthetics for him. Following another accident, Christian's willpower diminished, causing the constructs to vanish.

During the Underworld Unleashed crossover event, Christian accepted the demon-lord Neron's offer to regain his legs and was given superpowers. As the green flame-emitting Purgatory, he was sent to kill Kyle before being defeated by him and taken to Hell by Neron.

=== Purgatory in other media ===
Purgatory appears as a character summon in Scribblenauts Unmasked: A DC Comics Adventure.

== Puzzler ==
- First appearance: Action Comics #49 (June 1942)
- Created by: Jerry Siegel and John Sikela
- Further reading: Puzzler at the Comic Book DB (archived from the original); Puzzler at the Grand Comics Database

The Puzzler is a name used by three supervillains in the DC Universe.

=== First version ===
The concept and original character, created by Jerry Siegel and John Sikela, first appeared in Action Comics #49 (June 1942).

The original Puzzler is an unnamed non-costumed criminal who is skilled in parlor games and puzzles and operates a protection racket in Metropolis. The character, along with most of the Golden Age Superman material, was later assigned to the universe of Earth-Two in the DC Multiverse, before being removed from continuity during Crisis on Infinite Earths.

=== Second version ===
The name of the Puzzler was reused in Superman (vol. 2) #187 (December 2002) as the supervillain identity of Valerie van Haaften, a new version of the character whose body was composed of living "puzzle pieces". In the first appearance, as "Puzzler", she admits that she is a large fan of Superman's, and initially attempted to join several super groups to no avail. Thus, she decided that she would become a villain to gain his attention. Her body is composed of multiple large "puzzle pieces" that she can fully control, even when they are not directly attached to her. Superman disperses her with his super breath.

The Puzzler reappeared in Superman: Up, Up and Away! during the "One Year Later" story arc as an assassin hired by Intergang to kill Clark Kent. When she sees Superman, she decides to attempt to kill him instead to become famous. During the fight, she reveals she has been "upgraded" to have pieces that are nearly indestructible. Her "puzzle pieces" are much smaller and appear to be able to hit with greater force than her previous appearance. Superman defeats her again by trapping her component pieces in separate containers - preventing her from building up sufficient speed to escape.

=== Third version ===
In September 2011, The New 52 rebooted DC's continuity. In this new timeline, a new character called the Puzzler under an alias of "Agent Evans" appears as a member of A.R.G.U.S. He is later revealed to be a descendant of Vandal Savage.

=== Puzzler in other media ===
- The Puzzler appears in the Batman consecutive episodes "The Puzzles Are Coming" and "The Duo Is Slumming", portrayed by Maurice Evans. Originally, the episodes were going to feature the Riddler (portrayed by Frank Gorshin) and were titled "A Penny for Your Riddles" and "They're Worth a Lot More", but they were reworked due to Gorshin being in the midst of a contract dispute with the series' producers as he no longer wanted to portray the Riddler.
- An unidentified incarnation of the Puzzler makes non-speaking cameo appearances in Justice League Unlimited as a member of Gorilla Grodd's Secret Society.
