= Chris King and Vicki Grant =

Characters from DC Comics

Chris King and Vicky Grant
- Cover of Adventure Comics #479, featuring Chris King and Vicki Grant; art by Carmine Infantino and Bob Smith.

Publication information
- Publisher: DC Comics
- First appearance: Legion of Super-Heroes #272 (February 1981)

In-story information
- Alter ego: Christopher King; Victoria Grant
- Species: Humans
- Place of origin: Earth
- Team affiliations: Teen Titans
- Abilities: Can use the H-Dial to turn into superheroes

Christopher "Chris" King and Victoria "Vicki" Grant are depicted as two featured duo characters from DC Comics within the series Dial H for Hero. They are portrayed as normal kids who can transform themselves as superheroes replacing Robby Reed during the 1980s.

== Fictional character biography ==
=== Original series ===
The second Dial H for Hero series debuted in the 1980s, in a special insert in Legion of Super-Heroes #272 (February 1981), then ran in Adventure Comics #479–490 and continued in New Adventures of Superboy #28–49; the duo also appeared alongside Superman in DC Comics Presents #44. The original writer and artist in the series were Marv Wolfman and Carmine Infantino.

In this series, two other dials are discovered years later by teenagers Christopher "Chris" King and Victoria "Vicki" Grant of the New England town of Fairfax in a "haunted house". These dials — disguised as a watch and a necklace — only have the letters H-E-R-O on them, and work only for an hour, after which they will not work for another hour. King and Grant begin protecting Fairfax from a number of menaces. Unknown to them, most of these villains are created by a mysterious villain known only as The Master (who is obsessed with the H-dials for reasons unknown for most of the series) who creates them from the cell samples of unknown people.

While anyone could use Chris and Vicki's H-dials, they always turned the user into a hero, regardless of his or her personality; even The Master was temporarily made good by one. This fact has been ignored in later stories. On one occasion, a hero's persona overwhelmed the heroic Chris's own personality; as "Ragnarok, the Cosmic Viking", he possessed no awareness of Chris King's memories and acted with disregard for others's property and safety, going so far as to threaten police officers and swat away Vicki (as the miniature heroine "Pixie") when she attempted to talk him down, failing to recognize her as an ally. On a side note, it was a matter of contention with Chris when he first started using the dial that while Vicki changed into useful heroes with applicable powers, Chris's powers tended to be obscure and not particularly useful to defeat his opponent, such as when he changed into a super hero that could duplicate things and he outright began complaining about his useless ability. Indeed, it was that issue where Vicki showed Chris to think "outside the box" and use his temporary gifts creatively so they could be useful, at which point he helped defeat that issue's bad guy. Once this lesson was learned, Chris's super-hero changes became more relevant to the situation, but no explanation was given as to why this was.

Eventually Chris and Vicki discover that a fellow student named Nick Stevens has been drawing up superheroes as a hobby — and somehow, the dials turn them into those heroes. With Nick's help, they find out that their dials were created by a being called The Wizard (not to be confused with the DC Comics villain of the same name), whom the Master thought he'd killed years before. In truth, The Wizard faked his death while he looked for the original Hero Dial. With it, he merges with The Master — and transforms into Robby Reed, who explains that years before, he had used the dial to split in two (dialing "S P L I T") so that he could disarm a dead man's switch, while his other self, the Wizard, defeated the villain who set it. However, the Wizard carried all of Robby's inherent goodness, while the Robby that remained possessed only evil impulses; the original Hero Dial was lost when this Robby, renaming himself The Master, dialed "hide yourself", causing the dial to vanish along with The Master's and The Wizard's memories of their former life as Robby Reed. While The Master learned genetic techniques that allowed him to create his army of super-villains, the Wizard was driven to create the new H-dials, unconsciously designing limitations into them to prevent what happened to Robby from recurring (only heroic identities, a time limit, and the exclusion of letters other than H-E-R-O; the latter, however, did not prevent Chris from experimenting on one occasion and dialing H-O-R-R-O-R, with disastrous results). With Nick developing the ability to actively influence the dials' results (rather than subconsciously as before), Robby passes his dial to Nick, and retires as a hero.

In New Teen Titans #45 (June 1988), Victoria and Chris's history after the end of their series is revealed. After the two teens graduated from high school Vicki was recruited to join a cult called the Children of the Sun, where she was physically and mentally abused, deranging her. She sought out her former partner Chris in order to kill him. With help from the Teen Titans, Chris rescued her in the following issue. Chris now finds that he changes into a new superhero every hour, without the dial, and remains that way until he expends an unspecified amount of energy. He decides to continue his superhero career, using a suit provided by S.T.A.R. Labs to monitor his changes.

In Superboy and the Ravers #5 (January 1997), Hero Cruz finds Vicki's H-dial in the lair of Scavenger, and uses it to gain superpowers. A still deranged Vicki returns in issue #13 (September 1997) to get her dial back from Hero, but she regains her sanity once she uses the device. She is last seen in the care of the Forces, a family of metahumans.

=== Other appearances ===
- As an epilogue to the Chris King/Vicki Grant Dial H series, The New Adventures of Superboy #50 features a story in which Chris King's watch is stolen from the Space Museum of the Legion of Super-Heroes' time period by a thief named Nylor Truggs, who flees with the dial to the ambiguous late 1960s/early 1970s era-Smallville of the original (Earth-One) Superboy by altering the dial's functions in some unexplained manner, allowing him to travel in time. Truggs further alters the H-dial to break the restriction that users can only transform into heroic identities, changing the "H" in the center of the dial to "V" for "villain". Truggs also makes the dial capable of changing individuals other than himself into villains if he desires; those transformed would then be under Truggs's control. Truggs transforms several of Clark Kent's high school friends, and forms a temporary alliance with a teenaged Lex Luthor, in a scheme to plant seismic devices in their time period so that Truggs can use those devices against the people of his own future time upon his return. Truggs's plan is foiled by Superboy, several members of the Legion, and Krypto the Superdog, the latter of which destroys the stolen H-Dial by crushing it in his jaws. Vicki Grant's H-Dial is also shown to have survived to the Legion's time and is slated to replace King's dial in the museum display. As this story was published before the events of the Crisis on Infinite Earths (which erased the Earth-One Superboy from continuity) and the subsequent rebootings of the Legion of Super-Heroes's history, it is unlikely that any elements of this story exist in current continuity.

== Hero forms ==
=== Chris King ===
- Moth – A superhero with flight ability.
- Mega Boy – A superhero that could shoot powerful beams from his hands.
- Color Commando – A superhero who used a variety of color-based weapons with different effects.
- Doomster, Master of the Cosmic Lightning – A superhero that could shoot and ride lightning bolts.
- Composite Man – A superhero who could create miniature duplicates of himself.
- Captain Electron – A superhero that could shoot destructive electron-blasts from his hands.
- Mister Mystical, Master of Magic – A superhero who possessed magical abilities.
- Star Flare – Described by Chris as "the Human Missile" and "the greatest hero since Superman". This identity allowed Chris to fly and wield a star sword.
- Solar Flare – A superhero with the ability to fly and a power punch (although Chris was only shown using the latter).
- Wrangler – A "cosmic cowboy" that Chris became to battle Battering Ram.
- Goldman – A flying superhero who created "gold" constructs. He is the partner of Goldgirl.
- Sixth Sensor – A mind-reading superhero.
- Volcano – A superhero with power over the earth, specifically lava.
- Mister Thin – A two-dimensional creature that could stretch like a rubber band. He has four legs and a freakish face.
- Interchange the Metamorphic Man - A hero that has a tank power that was never shown.
- Anti-Man – A flying superhero with anti-matter blasts.
- Dragonfly – A winged superhero with multi-directional sight.
- Teleman – A teleporting superhero.
- Zeep the Living Sponge – He was created by future comic-book artist Stephen DeStefano. Zeep later appeared in DeStefano and Bob Rozakis's Hero Hotline series. He had the power to bounce.
- Lightmaster – A superhero, but no other details were given. This character and the next in this list were dismissed in but one panel.
- Molecule Man – A superhero. No other details were given.
- Music Master – A superhero with a radio that turned sound into energy he could manipulate.
- Gladiator – A superhero with a sorcery-spawned power sword. This character could not fly.
- White – A superhero who emitted a beam of white energy that was harmless until it crossed a similar beam from his partner Black.
- Waspman – A flying superhero who fired "wasp stingers".
- Vibro the Quakemaster – A superhero with vibration power.
- Steadfast – A superhero with the power to immobilize anything moving.
- Gravity Boy – A superhero that controlled gravity.
- Blast Boy – A superhero with an explosive punch.
- Electrostatic – A superhero that is the master of all electromagnetic waves.
- Lumino – A superhero that is able to create solid light shapes.
- Enlarger Man – A superhero that is able to enlarge things.
- Brimstone – A superhero that can fly and control lava.
- Avatar – A master of the four elements who rode Sahri the Spirit Tiger.
- Wind Rider – A superhero that is able to fly and control air.
- Psi-Fire – A superhero that could solidify or become intangible with his mental powers.
- Oxide – A superhero that could cause metal to rust.
- Ragnarok the Cosmic Viking – A mystical superhero with enhanced strength and a magical battle axe. Ragnarok's self-identity completely suppressed Chris's own personality, including his knowledge that Vicki (as Pixie) was an ally.
- Captain Saturn – A superhero who could control giant flying rings that could bind enemies.
- Moonlight – A superhero with the power to project either bright light or darkness.
- Mental Man – A superhero with goggles that allowed him to project realistic illusions.
- Neon – An energy-blasting superhero.
- Phase Master – A superhero who could turn anything into solid, liquid, or gas.
- Multi-Force – A superhero who could create a duplicate of any object.
- Gemstone – A superhero with a super-hard crystalline body.
- Hasty Pudding - A superhero who could not move normally. He either stood rock still or ran like the Flash.
- Radar Man – A superhero that is able to locate things and teleport to their location.
- Stuntmaster – A superhero that rode a high-tech motorcycle and had an energy-firing scepter.
- Shadow Master – A superhero that is able to create shadows.
- Centaurus, Master of Vibration – A superhero with the ability to absorb vibration and use it as an energy blast.
- Deflecto – A superhero that could create projectile force-fields that would deflect anything thrown at him.
- Worm Man – A superhero that is half-human, half-giant worm. He could eat/dig his way through earth at super-speed.
- Spectro – A superhero whose powers were never shown. This and the next 3 are another instance where characters that somebody took the trouble to create was dismissed in but one panel. These were on a world where time works differently.
- Airmaster – A superhero whose powers were never shown.
- Sting – A superhero whose powers were never shown.
- Attacko – A superhero whose powers were never shown.
- Galaxy – A superhero that is able to teleport himself and others travel across space and back to Earth. This hero managed to escape the strange time-altered world.
- Topsy-Turvy – A superhero that causes others to feel extremely disoriented.
- Beast-Maniac – Chris King jokingly dialed "H-O-R-R-O-R" and became an evil creature that was super-strong and could fly with arm-wings. It took Superman to stop and restrain him and then try to analyze the H-Dials (he found no internal mechanisms with his X-Ray vision whatsoever).
- Prism – A superhero that could absorb energy and then return it magnified one hundred-fold.
- Essence – A superhero that could suck the lifeforce from his enemies with his scepter.
- Red Devil – He could turn into a variety of demons including invisible and large spike.
- Tar-Man – A living tar superhero who could become super hard or soft and squirt tar.
- Mr. Opposite – A superhero that is able to make anything act in the opposite way to what it naturally does. Vicki dialed Chris into this identity and Chris wondered if the fact that Vicki was the "opposite sex" may have influenced the transformation.
- Power Punch –
- Cold Wave –
- Earthman – A superhero that was able to manipulate the Earth's gravitational and magnetic fields.
- Any-Body – A superhero could duplicate the appearance of any other person.
- Jimmy Gymnastic – A superhero that was a super-athlete.
- Trail Blazer – A superhero able to fly and track villains, causing their trails to be outlined in flame.
- Roll – A superhero with super-speed.
- Kinetic Kid –
- Glassman –
- X-Rayder –
- Spheror –
- Fuzz-Ball - A superhero that was a fuzzy head with feet but no body or arms. He is the partner of "Raggedy Doll".
- Trouble-Clef: Master of Magical Music –
- Serrator –
- Synapse the Energy Man –
- Martian Marshall – A Western version of Martian Manhunter.
- Rubberneck – A stretchable superhero.

=== Vicki Grant ===
- Futura – A superheroine with flight, precognition, possibly other psionic powers.
- Sunspot – A superheroine with solar-energy powers.
- Ice – A superheroine with cold-based powers & flight.
- Grasshopper – A superheroine with super-leaping & agility.
- Twilight, Mistress of the Dark – A superheroine with shadow powers.
- Windsong – A superheroine with the ability to control winds.
- Molecule Maiden – A superheroine with the ability to control molecules.
- Hypno Girl – A superheroine with hypnotic abilities. This identity could not fly much to Vicki's annoyance.
- Midnight Wisp – A superheroine who is the "fastest girl in Fairfax".
- Strato-Girl, Mistress of the Wind – A superheroine that can control winds.
- Goldgirl – A superheroine that has flight & generation of "gold" constructs. She is a partner of Goldman.
- Alchemiss – A superheroine that with command of the Earth's four ancient elements.
- Dimension Girl – A superheroine who is able to generate other-dimensional portals.
- Stellar – A superheroine able to control the air.
- Ultra Girl – A gorgeous superheroine with super-strength.
- Starlet – Another superheroine with super-strength and the ability to "know a target's weakest point".
- Cardinal – A telekinetic superheroine.
- Ani-Woman – A superheroine that is able to bring inanimate objects to life under her control.
- Thumbelina – A tiny superheroine with full-sized strength.
- Tiara Star – A superheroine, no other description given.
- Matter Girl – A superheroine, no other description given.
- Echo – A superheroine with energy-repelling powers.
- Ariel – A flying superheroine with energy powers.
- Black – A superheroine who emitted a beam of black energy that was harmless until it crossed a similar beam from her partner White.
- Weather Witch – A superheroine who controls the weather.
- Emerald Tiger – A superheroine with enhanced speed & strength.
- Rainbeaux, Mistress of Color – A superheroine that projects different colored beams, each with a different power.
- Hummingbird – A superheroine who could fly and move her wings at super-speed.
- Hydra, Goddess of the Sea – A superheroine that can control water.
- Hyptella – A superheroine who is the Mistress of Hypnotism. Unlike Vicki's previous hypnotism-based identity, Hyptella could fly.
- Sonik – A superheroine that can control sound.
- Puma the She-Cat – A superheroine with super-agility.
- Sulphur – A superheroine that can generate a cloud of sulphur. She couldn't fly and actually oozed sulphuric acid out of her feet.
- Sparrowhawk – A superheroine with wings.
- Kismet, Mistress of Mind Wave – A superheroine who possessed clairvoyance.
- Plant Mistress – A superheroine able to control any plant that grows.
- Sea Mist – A superheroine able to create watery vapors.
- Harp – A superheroine with winged flight and a magical harp that calmed targets.
- Pixie – A tiny superheroine with magical "fairy dust".
- Snowfall – A superheroine with ice powers.
- Glass Lass – A crystalline superheroine with "glass" skin and power to amplify light into laser beams.
- Unicorn – A superheroine whose horn healed with a touch.
- Queen of Hearts – An emotion-controlling superheroine.
- Blue Biker – A superheroine that drove a high-powered bicycle, but had no powers whatsoever. She pretended to be Unicorn to testify in a court case against Tsunami and Distortionex.
- Weaver – A superheroine who could weave webs into different shapes.
- Frosty – A superheroine whose eyes had white irises and blue sclera. Her icy gaze could shatter any substance at will. The original creation (which never made it to the printed page) also included telepathic powers and the ability to teleport short distances. Frosty was created by Ann-Marie Roy (née Leslie) from Scotland.
- Tempest – The "hair" on her head transformed into various kinds of weather phenomena.
- Starburst – A superheroine with flight and energy blast powers.
- Spinning Jenny – A superheroine that could fly and spin at super-speed, so fast that she could even travel through time.
- Scylla – A superheroine that had mechanical serpent heads with laser eyes attached to her sides.
- Sphera – A superheroine who could create spheres of any material for a variety of effects.
- Blazerina – A superheroine who could dance and spin to build up a powerful blast of laser energy.
- Thundera – A superheroine with thunderous shout and destructive eye-beams.
- Monarch – A superheroine who could fly with large butterfly-like wings.
- Miss Hourglass – A superheroine with the ability to control time.
- Sirocco the Desert Wind – A hero that has the power of infinite wind.
- Infra-Violet –
- Gossamer – A flying superheroine who could weave cocoons.
- Fan –
- Visionary – A superheroine who could see several seconds into the future.
- Spyglass –
- Psi-Clone – A superheroine with psychic powers and the ability to create duplicates of people.
- Rock – A fun-loving superheroine with super-strength.
- Genesis – A superheroine able to transform living beings to stone and back and bring inanimate objects to life.
- Ms. Muscle –
- Lavender Skywriter – A superheroine who could cause objects to appear by skywriting their names with purple mist.
- Turnabout –
- Raggedy Doll – A living rag doll with no ability to move at all, let alone any powers and is a partner of "Fuzzball".
- Venus the Flying Trap –
- "Fish-Girl" (villainess) –
- "Fire Girl" (villainess) –
- "Water Girl" (villainess) –
- "Diamond Girl" (villainess) –
- "Electrical Girl" (villainess) –
- "Machinery Girl" (villainess) –
- Harpy (villainess) –
- Volcano Girl (villainess) –
- Sister Scissor-Limbs – A villainess with sharp shears for arms that could cut through most materials.
- Cobress (villainess) – A reptilian villainess with a hypnotic gaze.

== Villains ==
- Flying Buttress – A flying metallic warrior from another galaxy and servant to G.L.U.N.K.
- G.L.U.N.K. – Short for the Galactic Logistic Unit for Navigation and Knowledge, it is a talking spaceship with a freeze ray.
- Gordanian Robots – A group of robot sentries sent to Earth to protect Gordanian technology.
- Silver Fog – Samuel Toth is a supervillain that could take the form of a mist-like substance. This character was created by Harlan Ellison.
- Red Death – A scientist cursed with a disintegrating touch.
- Sphinx – An energy-draining extraterrestrial who emerged in modern times after crash-landing in Ancient Egypt. He went home peacefully after Vicki and Chris used their powers to make him a spaceship.
- Thunder Axe – A criminal that once captured Vicki's parents. He wielded an axe that he could throw and control across distance.
- Battering Ram – Bruno Hogan was a mutant and former circus star that was fired for theft and vowed revenge. He has ram horns on his head and has super-strength.
- Aquarians – A race of sea-dwelling aliens intent on colonizing the Earth using artificial storms.
  - Largo the Invincible – The greatest warrior of Aquaria.
- Destructess – Martha Winters is a mentally-ill woman endowed by Aquarians with energy-shooting bracelets.
- Interchange the Metamorphic Man – A supervillain with shape-changing powers that once threatened Washington D.C.
- Silversmith – A supervillain with the power to encase his enemies in silver.
- Blade Master – A supervillain hired by the H.I.V.E. to kill Professor Oxford.
- Gamesmaster – Gary Ames is a supervillain who uses game-themed weapons. He was mentioned to have been a former henchman of Joker.
- Wildebeest – A poacher who comes to America to hunt in a game preserve. This Wildebeest has no known connection to the Wildebeest Society that menaced the Teen Titans and was responsible for the creation of Pantha.
- Bounty Hunter – A costumed vigilante who targets a mobster. When he was arrested by the police, Bounty Hunter was killed by Pupil who was reprogrammed by Master. It was later revealed that he was a clone created by Master from the cell sample of an unknown person.
  - Pupil – A floating computer associated with Bounty Hunter that looked like a giant eye wearing a graduation cap.
- Master – A supervillain identity of Robby Reed.
- Mr. Negative – A man whose negative attitude and exposure to radiation made those around him feel suicidal.
- The Evil Eight – The Master's team of supervillains which he created from the cell samples of unknown people. The Evil Eight were used by Master to set up an ion forcefield around Fairfax so that he can get Ronald Reagan to make Fairfax his own independent country. Upon their defeat and exposure as clones, the Evil Eight were handed over to S.T.A.R. Labs for further study and psychic evaluation in hopes that they might be rehabilitated and returned to society as useful citizens.
  - Arsenal – An armored supervillain with various weapons.
  - Chondak – A blue ape-like humanoid monster with super-strength whose brain is visible in a clear dome.
  - Familiar – A female supervillain who is able to become any substance she touched.
  - Ice King – A helmet-wearing supervillain with the ability to generate and control ice. He can also ride a flying ice sled.
  - K-9 – A dog-themed supervillain with razor-sharp claws.
  - Maniak – An acrobatic supervillain.
  - Phantasm – A ghost-like supervillain with ghost-like abilities that can also summon demonic ghosts. He is not to be confused with the DC Comics character of the same name.
  - Piledriver – A supervillain with a metal torso and arms who possesses super-strength.
- Grockk the Devil's Son – A villain that apparently comes from the pits of Hell.
- Firegirl – A villainess that Grock created. She wasn't really evil and sacrificed herself to stop Grocck.
- Sky Raider – A flying thief who had stolen a Rembrandt from Vicki's father. He uses a jet pack to fly.
- Crimson Star – A supervillain created by the Master whose powers derive from the stars.
- Radiator – A supervillain created by the Master whose suit contains different radiation beams.
- Snakeman – Professor Charles Ralston is a scientist who had been transformed into a giant serpent after getting cut upon accidentally smashing a serum vial.
- Jinx – A supervillain created by the Master who had the power of jinxing. He is not to be confused with the DC Comics character of the same name.
- Cancero – An aquatic villain created by the Master who wears a crab-themed powered armor.
- Jelly Woman – A weird villainess created by the Master with a body composed of gelatinous substance.
- Belladonna – Angela Wainwright is a chemist turned criminal who carries poisonous substances in weaponized forms.
- Tsunami – A supervillainess created by the Master who could create destructive tidal waves similar to her namesake. She was partnered with Distortionex to create disaster situations while he robbed deserted businesses.
- Distortionex – A male supervillain created by the Master with the power to disintegrate matter. He was partnered with Tsunami to create disaster situations while he robbed deserted businesses.
- Controller – An artificial intelligence created by the Marionette to assist in operating his android body. The Controller became insane and directed the Marionette to commit criminal acts.
- Marionette – An alien who placed his mind in an android body controlled by the Controller's "marionette strings".
- Abyss – A living gateway between worlds. In "The New 52", Abyss returns as an opponent of Nelson Jent.
  - Squid – An alien who could project deadly 'ink' from his fingertips. He was the ally/servant of Abyss, who transported him to Earth from his homeworld. In "The New 52", he returned as an opponent of Nelson Jent.
- Blackjack – A villain from another planet who utilized deadly casino-based objects against his enemies.
- Serpent –
- Senses-Taker – A supervillain created by the Master with the power to negate the senses.
- Disc Jockey – Louis Yagger is a supervillain that flies on a giant flying record player and can force any device that produces sound to play his transmissions.
- Whitefire – A supervillain who can transport anything to his dimension by exchanging it with something from his own.
- Naiad – Diana Lyon is a supervillainess with water-based powers.
- Marauder – A supervillain that the Master used to spring Naiad from jail.
- Blade – One of the Master's minions. He is a supervillain who wielded an array of bladed weaponry that he can throw.
- Kaleidoscope – One of the Master's minions. She is a supervillainess who could create hallucinations and illusions through a light display reminiscent of her namesake.
- Chain Master – One of the Master's minions. He is a supervillain who wielded a ball and chain-type flail.
- Silhouette – One of the Master's minions. He is a supervillain who could absorb victims into his "shadow box" while transforming their shadows into duplicates under his control. His duplicates could be detected by the fact that they cast no shadows of their own.
- Firecracker – A supervillain that uses explosive firecrackers.
- Windrider – A flying supervillain who can control wind and create vortexes.
- Istanbul Frankie Perkins – A small-time criminal that the Silhouette (using a duplicate of Detective Greg King) tried to frame for a robbery.
- Coil – A supervillain created by the Master that once kidnapped Detective Greg King. He has the ability to extend and compress his body like a coil spring.
- Fire Devil – A demonic fiery skeleton-themed villain created by the Master with fire-based powers.
- Pod – He is a corn-like tentacled creature created by the Master.
- Golden Web – He is a spider-themed supervillain created by the Master who could weave golden webbing.
- Swarm – She is a flying insectoid woman created by the Master who could split herself into many insect-sized, spear-wielding duplicates with a collective mind.
- Power Pirate – He is a pirate-themed supervillain created by the Master who could drain superhuman abilities. If targets concentrate on their weaknesses rather than their strengths, he would absorb those weaknesses instead.
- Master's Unnamed Supervillain Army – A bunch of supervillains created by the Master from the cell samples of unknown people. Chris King and Vicki Grant fought them at the Master's factory hideout outside of Fairfax.
  - Aurora – A supervillainess that can project auras of different colors from her body and solidify them into weapons.
  - Blue Damsel Fly – A damselfly-themed supervillainess with insect wings who could fire energy beams from her hands.
  - Cableman – A supervillain who could release an entangling cable from his right hand.
  - Darkstar – A supervillain with unspecified energy projection abilities.
  - Decibel – A supervillain who possesses a sonic scream.
  - Electron – A supervillain who could generate electricity.
  - Hitpin – A supervillainess who threw weighted objects similar to bowling pins.
  - Metalliferro – A supervillain who could coat targets in metallic substances of his choice.
  - Overseer – A supervillainess in a dominatrix-styled costume who wields an energized chain.
  - Serpentina – A supervillainess with a petrifying gaze.
  - Solar Dynamo – A supervillain with unspecified energy projection abilities that might be solar-based.
  - Spyderr – A supervillain with six arms who possesses super-strength.
  - Titaness – A size-shifting supervillainess.
  - Trojan – A Trojan soldier-themed supervillain with unspecified energy projection abilities.
