= Squid (DC Comics) =

The Squid is the name of different characters appearing in American comic books published by DC Comics. The first Squid is a crime lord named Lawrence Loman who is an enemy of Batman.

== Publication history ==
The first Squid debuted in Detective Comics #497 (December 1980) and was created by Gerry Conway and Don Newton.

The second Squid debuted in Adventure Comics #490 (February 1982) and was created by E. Nelson Bridwell and Carmine Infantino.

== Fictional character biography ==
=== Lawrence Loman ===
Squid
- The Squid as depicted in Batman #357 (March 1983). Art by Ed Hannigan.

Publication information
- Publisher: DC Comics
- First appearance: Detective Comics #497 (December 1980)
- Created by: Gerry Conway; Don Newton

In-story information
- Full name: Lawrence Loman
- Species: Human
- Notable aliases: Clement Carp
- Abilities: Expert at leadership and espionage

Lawrence Loman, also known as Clement Carp, is a crime lord and criminal in Gotham City who seeks to fill the power vacuum left behind by Rupert Thorne and Tony Falco. He captures a giant squid which he names Gertrude and keeps in a large aquarium in his hideout. Squid is later killed by Killer Croc, a former member of his gang.

Squid is resurrected following the Crisis on Infinite Earths continuity reboot. In 52, the Squid is among the crime bosses captured by Bruno Mannheim of Intergang. Some of the crime bosses are killed for refusing to join Intergang, but Squid's fate is unknown.

In 2011, "The New 52" rebooted the DC universe. The Squid is re-established with a different appearance. Once again, he has a pet giant squid (who is also named Gertrude) which he uses to dispatch his foes. He was seen peddling a new drug called "Icarus" throughout the streets of Chinatown.

=== Unnamed alien ===
Squid
- The second Squid as depicted in Dial H #4 (October 2012). Art by Brian Bolland.

Publication information
- Publisher: DC Comics
- First appearance: Adventure Comics #490 (February 1982)
- Created by: E. Nelson Bridwell; Carmine Infantino

In-story information
- Abilities: Ink generation

The second Squid is an unnamed alien who arrived on Earth with Abyss to commit a string of robberies, encountering Chris King and Vicki Grant in the process. After being defeated, Squid attempts to flee through one of Abyss's portals, but Abyss is disoriented and sends him to an unknown location.

In The New 52 continuity reboot, Squid initially appears as a captive of Ex Nihilo before escaping. Squid works with Nelson Jent, a wielder of the H-Dial, to battle Ex Nihilo, only to be killed by Ex Nihilo in the ensuing battle.

== Powers and abilities ==
The first Squid is an expert at leadership skills and espionage.

The second Squid can project deadly ink with various properties.

== In other media ==
The Lawrence Loman incarnation of Squid appears in The Penguin, portrayed by Jared Abrahamson.

== See also ==
- List of Batman family enemies
