= Robby Reed =

- Cover of House of Mystery #156 (January 1966) featuring Robby Reed and his superhero forms Cometeer, Giantboy, and Mole. Art by Jim Mooney.

Publication information
- Publisher: DC Comics
- First appearance: House of Mystery #156 (January 1966)
- Created by: Jim Mooney; Dave Wood

In-story information
- Alter ego: Robert Reed
- Species: Human
- Place of origin: Earth
- Team affiliations: Teen Titans
- Abilities: Can use the H-Dial to turn into superheroes and villains

Robby Reed is a fictional character from DC Comics and the original protagonist of the long running comic book series Dial H for Hero. In the series, he is portrayed as a normal boy who transforms himself as a variety of superheroes.

== Fictional character biography ==
The character debuted in House of Mystery #156 (January 1966), and his storyline continued until issue #173 (March–April 1968). The art was by Jim Mooney (though he did not finish the run), with scripts by Dave Wood.

The original owner of the dial is portrayed as Robert "Robby" Reed, a highly intelligent teenager with a penchant for exclaiming "Sockamagee!" He lives in the fictional town of Littleville, Colorado with his grandfather "Gramps" Reed and their housekeeper Miss Millie. During a camping trip, Robby accidentally falls into a cavern and discovers the dial in one of its alcoves. The origins of the dial and how it came to be in the cavern are never revealed.

Resembling a rotary telephone dial, the device is hand-held with unknown symbols inside the dial's finger- openings and along its outer rim, which Robby deciphers into modern English letters. In Mark Waid's "Silver Age" mini-series, it is revealed that the symbols on the dial are Interlac. Each time he dials the letters H-E-R-O, Robby transforms into a different super-powered being; dialing O-R-E-H reverts him to his normal form. Robby soon uses the dial to protect Littleville under the guises of numerous superheroes.

The wide array of Robby's superhero identities included the Squid, Quake-Master, King Coil, Hornet-Man, Shadow-Man, Mighty Moppet, King Kandy, Future-Man, Human Bullet, Super-Charge, the Mole, Mr. Echo, Hypno-Man, the Cometeer and the Human Starfish, among others.

The H-Dial came with certain limitations. Typically, Robby could transform from one hero to another immediately, but occasionally he would have to wait an unspecified length of time after being one hero before using the dial again to become another. A "freak electrical storm" in space affects his H-Dial, changing him temporarily into oddly-shaped "freak" super-heroes dubbed "Whoozis", "Whatsis", and "Howzis". Certain high-pitched frequencies from a villain's supersonic motor affect Robby's hero forms, causing them to rob the criminals and keep the loot for themselves. Only after the motor is destroyed does Robby realize what is happening to him, enabling him to recover the stolen items.

Robby's H-Dial could also be used by others, transforming them into unique superhuman forms. The dial was once used by Robby's adversary Daffy Dagan. He briefly became a supervillain known as Daffy the Great after dialing V-I-L-L-A-I-N. Robby's girlfriend Suzie discovers Robby's secret and dialed H-E-R-O-I-N-E to temporarily transform into Gem Girl in order to help defeat Toymaster. At the end of the story, Suzie receives a blow to the head that causes her to forget about the secret of the device.

With issue #174, editor Joe Orlando dropped "Dial H for Hero" and "Manhunter from Mars" as regular features in House of Mystery, changing the comic to an anthology of horror-themed short stories.

After the series ceased its run in House of Mystery, Robby appeared in Plastic Man #13 (June–July 1976). Recovering from amnesia, Robby retrieves his dial which has become corroded with rust. The corrosion causes Robby to turn into an evil version of Plastic Man and he attacks the real Plastic Man. After defeating Robby and returning him to normal, Plastic Man confiscates the dial from Robby for using it irresponsibly. It is never explained how Robby is seen with the dial in later stories.

During a fight with Shirkon, Robby had to dial in D-I-V-I-D-E to split himself into Wizard and Master who had to deactivate a bomb and defeat Shirkon. When both sides attacked each other, Wizard faked his death and made two new H-Dials which were later found by Chris King and Vicki Grant while Master briefly worked for Project Cadmus and learned how to make supervillains from the cell samples of unknown humans. When it came to Chris and Vicki's fight with the Master where he trapped the two of them and their friend Nick Stevens in a flooding container, Wizard resurfaced and was able to get close enough for him and Master to merge back into Robby Reed with Nick's help. After rescuing Chris, Vicki, and Nick from the trap, Chris, Vicky, and Nick learn the truth behind his Wizard and Master forms. With Nick developing the ability to actively influence the dials' results (rather than subconsciously as before), Robby passes his dial to Nick, and retires as a hero.

=== Silver Age event ===
During the 2000 Silver Age cross-over event, Robby encountered his old House of Mystery co-star Martian Manhunter, in Silver Age: Dial H for Hero #1. Believing that he and the rest of the Justice League had gone bad, Robby turns into a superhero to stop him. Actually, Martian Manhunter has been mind-swapped with Doctor Light (the other Justice League have undergone similar mental transpositions, but those seen here are only Light's illusions).

Subsequently, in Silver Age 80-Page Giant #1 (July 2000), Robby lends the H-Dial to the Justice League, allowing several of its members to transform themselves into new superheroes to defeat Agamemno's Injustice League at a time when they had learned how to defeat the Justice League members in their normal forms:

- Superman becomes Doc Fission, a superhero who can divide his enemies.
- Batman becomes Minuteman, a superhero who can compress time and make punching hourglasses.
- Flash becomes Marionette, a superhero who has a weapon that is the letter X.
- Atom becomes Mod-Man, a superhero who resembles Robby Reed's King Coil form, but with limbs.
- Black Canary becomes Miss Fortune, a superhero who wields a magic wand.
- Aquaman becomes Terra-Firma, a superhero who is a hybrid of a brick and a Sasquatch.
- Green Arrow becomes Poltergeist, a ghost-themed superhero who can copy any power.
- Martian Manhunter becomes Go-Go, a teleporting superhero.

In these new forms, the Justice League were able to defeat the Injustice League.

=== DC Rebirth ===
In the comic series Dial H for Hero that was released during the "DC Rebirth", Robby Reed first became Giant-Boy when he first used the H-Dial. During his time with the H-Dial, Robby has also become Mole, King Kandy, Mighty Moppet, Radar Sonar Man, Tea Rex, and General Electric. When finds the Y-Dial, it splits him into the Operator and Mister Thunderbolt.

Mister Thunderbolt works to obtain all the H-Dials so that he can make use of the Multiverse Dial. However, Robby defeats him and vows to protect the Dials.

=== Other appearances ===
- In The Brave and the Bold #9 (February 2008), Robby Reed teamed up with the Metal Men, even lending the dial to Tin to allow him to transform into a more resilient superhero to defeat the monster conjured by the deranged alchemist Megistus. The dial, due to its transformative abilities, bore an optional part in Megistus' plans to draw the storm that brought about the genesis of Red Kryptonite upon Earth, warping it as to protect it from the events of the Final Crisis. Dial H appeared again in issue #27 of the same series, this time in a team-up with Batman. While staying at a hotel in Gotham City, Robby uses the dial to see the future but realizing that something will kill him while using the dial he decided to let the dial be stolen by a down on his luck young man named Travers Milton. After using the Dial to transform into a Superman-esque flying hero named the Star, Travers assists Batman in defending Gotham after the Joker arranges a series of violent crimes to be committed throughout the city in order to break Batman. After discovering that the final challenge for Batman is a remote-controlled bomb placed over a group of bound and gagged men and women, Travers heroically sacrifices his life by flying out into the night sky while clutching the bomb, saving Batman and the hostages seconds before it detonates. Afterwards, Batman returns the H-Dial to Robby who refused it because even though it prevents his eventual fate he didn't want to let it affect to anyone else but Batman tells him that it gave Travers what he had always wanted; the chance to be a hero that Robby will do the same thing. There is no indication given as to where either of the "Brave & the Bold" stories fit into Robby Reed's personal timeline however.
- In "Doomsday Clock", Robby Reed's Human Starfish form is among the superheroes who confront Doctor Manhattan on Mars.

== Hero forms ==
- Giantboy – A giant hero with super-strength and flight, fatally poisoned in his second appearance.
- Cometeer – A superhero that is a "Human Comet".
- Mole – A superhero that could dig underground at super speeds.
- Human Bullet – A superhero with flight and super endurance.
- Super Charge – A superhero of living energy.
- Radar-Sonar Man – A superhero that can fly and emit a radar and sonar to guide himself as he was blind.
- Quake-Master – A superhero that releases energy that cause objects to "shake".
- Squid – A superhero that has a helmet that release liquids. He can also fly via a special sled.
- Human Starfish – A humanoid starfish with superhuman strength.
- Hypno Man – A superhero that had mind control ability.
- Mighty Moppet - A baby-like hero with a squirt bottle that shrinks its targets down to his size and another bottle that changes them back to their normal size.
- King Kandy – A superhero that has candy-themed weapons.
- Plastic Man – Robby Reed once became Plastic Man and had his stretching abilities.
- Magneto – A superhero that has magnetic manipulation.
- Hornet Man – A superhero that could fly and had a paralyzing stinger on one finger.
- Shadow Man – A superhero that is a living shadow.
- Mr. Echo – A superhero that could absorb and deflect forces; he looks like a man-shaped sponge.
- Future-Man – A superhero that has illusion casting abilities and telekinesis.
- Castor and Pollux – Twin superheroes that have flight and super strength. Pollux was immortal.
- King Coil – A superhero that is made out of iron coils, who resembles the "Slinky" toy.
- Zip Tide – A superhero that is a living ocean wave.
- Super Nova – A superhero with the abilities of flight, super speed and atomic power.
- Robby the Super Robot – A superhero that has flight, limited molecular control, and super strength.
- Whoozis, Whatsis, and Howsis – Three freak super heroes. The dial was temporarily addled by a solar disturbance.
  - Whoozis – A superhero that bounces, body shaped like a rubber ball.
  - Whatsis – A superhero that flies. Body was a glider.
  - Howzis – A roughly humanoid robot that is a living pinball machine with various super powers, activated by pulling and releasing the appropriate plunger.
- Yankee Doodle Kid – A superhero that can fly and could create "fireworks".
- Chief Mighty Arrow – A superhero that uses Native American-themed weapons and has a winged horse named "Wingy".
- Balloon Boy – A rotund superhero with the power of flight.
- Muscle Man – A superhero that can emit energy blasts.
- Hoopster – A superhero who tosses hoops with special powers.
- Mole-Cometeer – A hybrid of Mole and Cometeer.
- Velocity Kid – A siren device on his chest propelled him through the air at the speed of sound.
- Astro: Man of Space – A superhero with a teleportation ability and other mental powers.
- Baron Buzz-Saw – Robby dialed the wrong number and was transformed into a superhero who wore buzz-saws on his wrists and belt. He can also fly.
- Don Juan – A superhero with a magic sword, the weapon which was later stolen by groupies.
- Sphinx Man – A superhero that has a stone body and wings that allowed him to fly. He could ask a person the "Riddle of the Sphinx" and the victim would vanish into Limbo if he did not answer correctly.
- King Viking – A sword-wielding superhero that can fly.
- Robby Go-Go – A super-fast, disco-dancing martial artist.
- Whirl-I-Gig - A non-humanoid being with spinning blades for limbs.
- Pendulum – A superhero that is a human pendulum.
- Human Solar Mirror – A superhero that can focus sunlight into a heat beam.
- Gillman (hero, then villain) – He breathes under water and swims super fast.
- Human Icicle (hero, then villain) – A superhero that can generate cold.
- Strata Man (hero, then villain) – A hero composed of several layers of rock-like substance, each with different properties.
- Tommy Tomorrow – A duplicate of the DC Comics space hero of the early 1960s.
- Twilight – A spirit that hunted the Dial and has the power of space and darkness. He is a member of the Thunderbolt gang for the second Thunderbolt club, but Robbie Reed transformed him as a hero.
- Pyronic Man - A creature made of living fire, he appeared in Silver Age Dial H for Hero where he was fighting the Justice League.
- Giant – A superhero that is larger than Giantboy. He was trying to stop the mind-swapping Justice League making a mess.
- Quadruplets - A quadruplicating version of Pyronic Man appearing in Silver Age Dial H for Hero.
- Circumference - A weird superhero with a spherical head and fingerless spheres for hands.
- Wizard – Robby Reed's hero half who created the dials used in the 80's series, but Wizard hid them in an abandoned house. He had the house guarded by spooks until the right people came to move in.
- Master – Robby Reed's villain half. He was responsible for creating most of the villains that Chris King and Vicki Grant fight from his factory outside of Fairfax. This was because he previously worked for Project Cadmus's DNA Project back in DC Comics Presents #44.
- Great Jupiter – A heroic identity assumed by Robby Reed's Master form using Chris King's H-Dial. He has powers related to the planet of the same name.
- Tea Rex - A British Tyrannosaurus-themed superhero.
- General Electric - A lamp-themed superhero.
- Thunderdoom - A hybrid of Mr. Thunderbolt and Doomsday.

== Enemies ==
Robby Reed had his own rogues gallery.

- Thunderbolt Organization –
  - Mr. Thunder – Eric Bolton is the head of the Thunderbolt Organization. He later becomes Moon Man upon a chemical accident that gave him lunar powers.
- Daffy the Great – Daffy Dagan once used the H-Dial to become Daffy the Great.
- The Clay-Creep Clan – A group of villains that can mold their pliable bodies into any shape.
  - Clay King - The leader of the Clay Creep Gang.
  - Eddie Keller - A member of the Clay Creep Gang.
  - Joey Burton - A member of the Clay Creep Gang.
- The Wizard of Light – Dr. Drago is a supervillain that uses light-based weapons.
- Mummy – Joe Beket is a mummy-themed villain that wields ancient magic.
- Professor Nabor – The inventor of a ray device that temporarily turns people into mindless monsters.
- Baron Bug – Asupervillain who enlarges insects to do his bidding. He later appeared in 52 as a member of the Science Squad.
- Doctor Cyclops – A one-eyed supervillain with strange vision powers. He later appeared in 52 as a member of the Science Squad.
- Dr. Rigoro Mortis – A mad scientist who was the creator of Super-Hood. He later appeared in 52 as a member of the Science Squad.
  - Super-Hood – A monstrous criminal android.
- Cougar Man – Justin Mudd is a cougar-themed gangster who steals Professor Morgan's device that makes legends come to life.
- Rainbow Raider – Dr. Quin is a supervillain who gains a different power for every color of the rainbow that he assumes for a certain amount of time ever since he came in contact with a rainbow crystal. Red grants him energy projection, Orange can make him generate fog, Yellow can have him absorb energy, Green can have him shoot a slow-motion ray, Blue and Indigo grant him unknown abilities, Violet can enable him to alter the size of anything, and Ultraviolet can make him invisible. He is not to be confused of the Flash villain of the same name.
- Toymaster – A supervillain that uses toy-based or toy-themed devices and gimmicks in his crimes.
- Dr. Morhar – A scientist that enlarged some micro-organisms.
- Jim – A friend of Robby Reed's who turned into different monsters every time Robby turned into a hero because of a temporary defect in the H-Dial.
- The Speed Boys – A criminal gang known for using high-speed getaway vehicles.
  - Sonic -
  - Throttle -
- Shirkon – A supervillain that Robby Reed fought. His battle with him resulted in Robby Reed splitting into Wizard and Master.

== In other media ==
Robby Reed appears in Teen Titans Go! #52. This version is a member of Cyborg's New Teen Titans training program who previously wielded the H-Dial until he learned it borrows the powers of nearby metahumans and gave it up. Throughout the issue, he borrows Beast Boy, Aqualad, Kid Flash, Wonder Girl, and Robin's powers to become Changeling, Lagoon Boy, Jesse Quick, Power Boy, and the Protector respectively.

== See also ==
- Ben Tennyson
- Chris King and Vicki Grant
