= List of DC Comics characters: T =

== Tala ==
- First appearance: Phantom Stranger (vol. 2) #4 (December 1969)
- Created by: Neal Adams; Robert Kanigher
- Species: Demon
- Further reading: Tala at Comic Vine

Tala is a demonic sorcerer who first appeared as an adversary of the Phantom Stranger. Tala first appeared in Phantom Stranger (vol. 2) #4, and was created by Neal Adams and Robert Kanigher.

Tala, the Queen of Evil, is an evil mystical entity and the mistress of the Dark Circle. Her agenda often consists of tricking mortals into doing evil deeds, or unleashing the apocalypse onto the modern world. She frequently confronts the Phantom Stranger, usually along with Doctor Thirteen, by using her powers to enslave mortals.

In post-Crisis continuity, Tala is a demon and mistress of Hell. She is known for either trying to doom mortals' souls to ruin or aiming to unleash apocalyptic evils upon the world.

=== Tala in other media ===
- Tala appears in Justice League Unlimited, voiced by Juliet Landau. This version is a member of Project Cadmus in the second season and Gorilla Grodd's Secret Society in the third season, serving as a magic specialist in both groups. After Lex Luthor takes control of the Society and imprisons Grodd, Tala releases Grodd to incite a mutiny to which Luthor kills the latter and forces Tala to power a machine to revive Brainiac, but she revives Darkseid instead before dying.
  - Tala appears in issue #37 of the Justice League Unlimited tie-in comic book series.
- Tala appears in DC Universe Online as a vendor in the Hall of Doom and the final boss of the "Hand of Fate" DLC.
- Tala appears as a character summon in Scribblenauts Unmasked: A DC Comics Adventure.

== Tapeworm ==
Tapeworm is a worm-like villain who is able to detach and regenerate parts of his body. He was imprisoned by the OMAC beneath Blüdhaven, and fights Robin and the Shadowpact after escaping. He later appears in Salvation Run, allying himself with the Joker, and is part of a large contingent of supervillains enlisted to fight the Justice Society of America.

== Elliot Taylor ==
Elliot Taylor is a private in the US Army during World War II who was nearly killed by a land mine. Professor Mazursky and his team of surgeons at Project M were able to repair Taylor's body in a form that resembles Frankenstein's monster. However, they are unable to restore Taylor's vocal cords, leaving him mute. Taylor goes on to join the Creature Commandos under the codename Patchwork.

=== Elliot Taylor in other media ===
- Elliot Taylor appears in the Batman: The Brave and the Bold episode "Four Star Spectacular!", voiced by Dee Bradley Baker.
- Elliot Taylor appears in the "Creature Commandos" segment of DC Nation Shorts, voiced by Kevin Shinick.
- Elliot Taylor makes a non-speaking appearance in DC Showcase: Sgt. Rock.

== Teel ==
Teel is a Durlan shapeshifter who was forced to become an assassin for the Cabal. He impersonated Plastic Man to kill some of his friends in an effort to frame him for the murders.

== Teen Lantern ==
Teen Lantern (Keli Quintela) is an young girl who found a dying Green Lantern and obtained his Green Lantern Power Battery, hacking a gauntlet to access its powers without the knowledge of the Green Lantern Corps, using it to become a superhero known as the Teen Lantern.

It is later revealed that Keli's gauntlet was originally owned by Krona, who utilizes it to possess Simon Baz and activate a failsafe that allows himself to be reborn in a duplicate of Hal Jordan's body. After learning this, Keli is given a power ring to replace the gauntlet.

== Bruno Tess ==
Bruno Tess is a mob boss from Gotham City who works for the Penguin until he is murdered by the Scarecrow who had been mutated into the Scarebeast.

=== Bruno Tess in other media ===
Bruno Tess appears in The Penguin, portrayed by Daniel J. Watts. This version is an enforcer working under Oz Cobb.

== Paco Testas ==
- First appearance: Infinite Crisis #3 (February 2006)
- Created by: Keith Giffen, John Rogers, Cully Hamner
- Aliases: Blood Beetle

Paco Testas is a friend of Jaime Reyes / Blue Beetle. When Jaime disappears for a year, Paco is questioned by the police but is eventually released. Brenda Del Vecchio moves to another city so Paco eventually joins the Posse, a street gang. Exactly a year later, Jaime returns and rescues Paco from La Dama's thugs.

The New 52 reboot provides the character's full name. He and Jaime were on their way to Brenda's birthday party but are caught in a conflict between two supervillain factions. Soon after, Phobia, Warp, Plasmus and Silverback track Paco down but he is saved by Blue Beetle, discovering Jaime's secret identity in the process. Khaji Da attempts to kill Paco but Jaime regains control and gives the Transbiotic Antitrauma Unit (T.A.U) to Paco which gives him similar powers as Blood Beetle. The T.A.U eventually attempts to force Paco to kill Jaime and Khaji Da. The T.A.U is shut down yet cannot be removed as it keeps Paco alive. The T.A.U. reactivates, kidnapping Brenda to bring out Blue Beetle. Khaji Da finds a method to save Paco by transferring heart tissue from Jaime to Paco and patching up the wound.

=== Paco Testas in other media ===
Paco appears in Batman: The Brave and the Bold, voiced by Jason Marsden.

== Doctor Thawne ==
Doctor Thawne is a character appearing in American comic books published by DC Comics. The character, created by Adam Beechen and Ryan Benjamin, first appeared in Batman Beyond vol. 3 #6 (January 2011).

A similar character is seen in the mainstream DC universe as the father of Eobard Thawne / Reverse-Flash. In the future, the doctor and his partner never showed emotional support to neither Eobard nor Robern Thawne so the Reverse-Flash's future self killed his own mother and father. The New 52 shows Eobard's childhood where his father killed his mother.

== Elenore Thawne ==
Elenore Thawne is a character appearing in comic books published by DC Comics' Absolute Universe. She is the granddaughter of Eobard Thawne and the head of Project Olympus.

== Malcolm Thawne ==
Malcolm Thawne is a character appearing in American comic books published by DC Comics as Cobalt Blue, an enemy of the Flash. The character was created by Mark Waid and Brian Augustyn, and first appeared in Speed Force #1 (November 1997). He is the twin brother of Barry Allen, an enemy of Wally West, and a distant ancestor of Eobard Thawne.

Malcolm was raised as the son of con artists (Hugo Thawne and Charlene Thawne) who lure unsuspecting victims. He learned in Central City that he's actually Henry Allen's and Nora Allen's other son who Asa Gilmore used to cover Hugo's and Charlene's true child's accidental killing, resulting in him tracking down and murdering the doctor in a rage. His grandmother helped train him as he was fueled by rage and jealousy to utilize the Blue Flame Talisman capable of stealing super-speed. His first attempt against Barry ended in failure, and he was absorbed into the Blue Flame Talisman, only to re-emerge years later after Barry's death during the "Crisis on Infinite Earths" with Wally as a successor. Apparently having been cheated out of his dreams of revenge, Malcolm instead focused on his brother's descendants traveling through time in a bid to exterminate. His Cobalt Blue identity ignited a family feud that endured for a millennium. The feud came to a head in the late 30th century, where Barry was living with Iris Allen and Wally arrived as protection. Various speedsters (including Jay Garrick, the Tornado Twins, and XS) are under the control of Thawne's spirit as each one carried a shard of the Blue Flame Talisman. After defeating the other speedsters, Thawne's menace ended with Wally overloading the Blue Flame Talisman with the Speed Force's energy.

=== Malcolm Thawne in other media ===
- Cobalt Blue appears as a character summon in Scribblenauts Unmasked: A DC Comics Adventure.
- A character based on Malcolm Thawne / Cobalt Blue named Eddie Thawne appears in The Flash (2014), portrayed by Rick Cosnett. This version is a colleague of Barry Allen, boyfriend of Iris West-Allen, and ancestor of Eobard Thawne. In the first season, Eddie works as a detective of the Central City Police Department with Barry, Iris and Joe West until he sacrifices himself to kill Eobard. In the ninth season, the Cobalt-97 resurrects Eddie as Mercury Labs' scientist Malcolm Gilmore in the year 2049 to manipulate him into becoming a speedster. Eddie overcomes the Negative Speed Force's influence and reconciles with Barry.

== Robern Thawne ==
Robern Thawne is the younger brother of Eobard Thawne / Reverse-Flash. In the future, the Thawne siblings never got along as children which gets worse as adults; Robern is a police officer who interrupts Eobard's reckless research before the Reverse-Flash's future self erased his own brother from existence to prevent interference.

== Thoth ==
- First appearance: Infinity Inc. #43 (1987)
- Teams: Ogdoad; Doctor Fate; Ibis the Invincible
- Abilities: Immotallity, immense magical abilities, godly wisdom which grants him increased intelligence; Power is somewhat dependent on worship although he retains a formidable, god-like level of power in a weakened state.
- Aliases: Zehuti

Thoth, also known as Zehuti, is a deity in DC Comics, an interpretation of Thoth from Egyptian mythology. In the DC Universe, Thoth serves as an Egyptian figure who has empowered numerous characters, including Black Adam and the Black Marvel Family with his powers of wisdom, the both iterations of Ibis the Invincible with the Ibistick, and the Khalid Nassour incarnation of Doctor Fate.

In the Doctor Fate series debuting during "The New 52", Thoth is credited as the creator of the Amulet of Thoth (formerly the Amulet of Anubis) and Helmet of Fate (now named the Helmet of Thoth and the Mask of Thoth) that trapped his servant Nabu within it for unknown reasons. He is first mentioned numerous times by several characters during the "Blood Price" storyline, with Khalid Nassour being chosen to bear his helm. Later, Khalid summons him to help defeat Anubis, after which he gives Khalid the Staff of Power.

== Johnny Thunder ==
Johnny Thunder is the name of two superhero characters appearing in comics published by DC Comics. Johnny Thunder first appeared in Flash Comics #1 (January 1940) and was created by John Wentworth and Stan Aschmeier.

=== Johnny Thunder ===
John L. Thunder is the seventh son of a seventh son. This causes him to be kidnapped by men from Badhnesia who seek to harness his power. Johnny gains possession of the genie-like entity Thunderbolt during a mystic ritual on his 7th birthday, which was intended to allow the Badhnesians to rule the world. With Thunderbolt, Johnny went on to join the Justice Society of America. In a later battle with Solomon Grundy, Johnny is controlled by the Ultra-Humanite and eventually killed. Unable to physically resurrect Johnny, Thunderbolt fuses with him instead, granting Johnny his powers.

=== Jonni Thunder ===
Jonni Thunder is a female private detective. A small gold statue gives her the power to turn into a human thunderbolt, while leaving her body behind. Initially described as a stone imbued with the power of Inca deity Apu Illapu, the thunderbolt is later revealed to be a hostile alien. It is eventually defeated and imprisoned, leaving Jonni powerless.

=== Johnny Thunder in other media ===
- Johnny Thunder makes non-speaking appearances in Justice League Unlimited as a member of the Justice League.
- Johnny Thunder appears in Stargirl, portrayed by an uncredited actor in the first season and Ethan Embry in the second season. This version was a member of the Justice Society of America before being killed by Brainwave.
- Johnny Thunder and Jonni Thunder appear as character summons in Scribblenauts Unmasked: A DC Comics Adventure.

== Thunderer ==
Thunderer is the name of several characters appearing in American comic books published by DC Comics

=== Alien version ===
The first Thunderer is an alien demagogue who came from another dimension and wanted to take over the Earth before being opposed by Metamorpho and Element Girl. He traps the two in a sub-atomic universe until they escape and two elders of Thunderer's species arrive to punish him.

=== Second version ===
The second Thunderer appears as a member of the Futurist Militia.

=== Earth 7 version ===
An alternate universe version of Thunderer from Earth-7 appears in The Multiversity. He is a Mowanjum weather god and member of the Justice League.

=== Thunderer in other media ===
The Earth-7 incarnation of Thunderer makes a non-speaking appearance in Justice League: Crisis on Infinite Earths.

== Tiger-Man ==
Tiger-Man is the name of several characters appearing in American comic books published by DC Comics.

=== Robotman villain ===
The first Tiger-Man is a tiger-themed criminal who fought Robotman and Robbie the Robot Dog.

=== Dean Farr ===
Dean Farr and his brother Desmond Farr met Buck Wargo when they were investigating the legend of the Tiger-Man. Dean would end up turned into a Tiger-Man.

Tiger-Man would later be killed in an accident.

=== Desmond Farr ===
Desmond Farr is the brother of Dean Farr who joined him in meeting Buck Wargo when they were investigating the legend of the Tiger-Man.

After Dean died in an accident, Desmond became the second Tiger-Man and later allied with Green Lantern.

In New History of the DC Universe, Desmond is stated to have been a member of the short-lived Justice Alliance when the Justice Society of America disbanded and its members disappeared.

=== Tiger-Man in other media ===
Dean Farr and Desmond Farr appear in Superman, portrayed by Jonah Lees and Christian Lees respectively. These versions are employees of LexCorp.

== Time Trapper ==
The Time Trapper was originally depicted as a robed warlord from the distant future, well past the 31st century that the Legion of Super-Heroes originate from. Later, it is revealed that the Time Trapper is a Controller. Later stories state that the Time Trapper is not a Controller, giving the character a series of contradictory origins. The Time Trapper has been depicted as a future version of Cosmic Boy, Superboy-Prime, and Doomsday. In Final Crisis: Legion of 3 Worlds, Brainiac 5 theorizes that the Time Trapper is a sentient timeline whose identity changes constantly as the main timeline evolves.

=== Time Trapper in other media ===
- The Time Trapper appears in JLA Adventures: Trapped in Time, voiced by Corey Burton. This version is a dark matter entity who is imprisoned in the Eternity Glass, exists outside of time, and is immune to any alterations made to it.
- The Time Trapper appears as a character summon in Scribblenauts Unmasked: A DC Comics Adventure.
- The Time Trapper appears in All-New Batman: The Brave and the Bold #7.

== Titan ==
Titan is the name of two characters appearing in American comic books published by DC Comics.

=== New God ===
The first Titan is a massive green-skinned warrior who is one of the New Gods of Apokolips and member of Darkseid's Elite. In his earlier history, Titan led an attack on New Genesis during the war between New Genesis and Apokolips. After Titan was the only survivor of an ambush, Darkseid had Titan remanded to the dungeon for 50 years. Some years later, Darkseid released Titan and gave him an opportunity to redeem himself by heading to Earth to abduct Brigadier General Maxwell Torch, who is in possession of a fragment of the Anti-Life Equation. This led to Titan battling Orion, who was there to protect Torch from Titan. Orion was able to fend off Titan.

=== Son of Cronus ===
The second Titan is one of the Children of Cronus and was unknown to the mortals like Arch, Disdain, Harrier, Oblivion, and Slaughter. He resembled a floating darkness with various human-shaped faces. Titan was among Cronus' dark children who helped empower Cronus' creation Devastation, granting her superhuman strength, enhanced durability, and a healing factor.

== Tokamak ==
- First appearance: The Fury of Firestorm #15 (August 1983)
- Created by: Gerry Conway and Pat Broderick
- Aliases: Henry Hewitt, Victor Hewitt
- Further reading: Tokamak at the Comic Book DB (archived from the original); Tokamak at the Grand Comics Database

Tokamak is a character appearing in American comic books published by DC Comics.

The character, created by Gerry Conway and Pat Broderick, first appeared in The Fury of Firestorm #15 (August 1983) as Henry Hewitt and as Tokamak in The Fury of Firestorm #18 (November 1983).

Henry Hewitt is the chief executive officer of the Hewitt Corporation and director of the 2000 Committee who subjected himself to a recreation of the accident that created Firestorm. Much later, to cure a terminal disease, he creates a clone of himself which he merges with. He creates the identity of Victor Hewitt to inherit his own company and sets out to create nuclear meltdowns across the globe to empower himself. He is stopped by Firestorm, Firehawk, and Pozhar. He is killed when Firestorm separates him from his clone.

Tokamak has the ability to trap objects in energy rings and either compress them or break down their structural integrity.

=== Tokamak in other media ===
- Henry Hewitt appears in The Flash, portrayed by Demore Barnes.
  - The Earth-1 version appears in the episode "The Fury of Firestorm". This version is a scientist with anger issues and a criminal past who was affected by Eobard Thawne's particle accelerator and gained a connection to the Firestorm matrix. As a result, the Flash and his allies at S.T.A.R. Labs select Hewitt to become Martin Stein's new partner. When the fusion fails, Hewitt gains uncontrollable nuclear powers which he uses to fight the Flash, only to be defeated by Stein and Jefferson "Jax" Jackson, both of whom successfully became Firestorm, and imprisoned at S.T.A.R. Labs.
  - Additionally, an Earth-2 counterpart of Hewitt appears in the episodes "Welcome to Earth-2" and "Escape from Earth-2" as a benevolent S.T.A.R. Labs scientist employed by Harry Wells.

== Joey Toledo ==
Joey Toledo is a drug dealer working for the 100. During a fight with Black Lightning, he is killed by Talia al Ghul and the League of Assassins after they become involved when trying to reclaim Merlyn's services.

In the DC Rebirth relaunch, Toledo is resurrected and appears as a sleazy small-time entrepreneur before Tobias Whale's right-hand woman Miss Pequod kills him.

=== Joey Toledo in other media ===
Joey Toledo appears in the first season of Black Lightning, portrayed by Eric Mendenhall. This version is Tobias Whale's right-hand man and co-enforcer.

== Derek Tolliver ==
Derek Tolliver was created by John Ostrander and Joe Brozowski, and first appeared in Firestorm (vol. 2) #64 (October 1987).

Derek Tolliver is the liaison between the Suicide Squad and the US government. He later turns on the team and Amanda Waller, for which he is killed by Rick Flag Jr.

=== Derek Tolliver in other media ===
Dexter Tolliver appears in Suicide Squad, portrayed by David Harbour. This version is the National Security Advisor of the United States who supports the creation and use of Task Force X.

== Torminox ==
Torminox (Richard Brinke) is the father of Casey Brinke who was mutated by the Torminox virus and fought his daughter on occasion. The Brinkes originate from an in-universe comic book, but were brought to life by Danny the Street.

=== Torminox in other media ===
Torminox appears in Doom Patrol, portrayed by Tyler Mane. This version, also known as Richard Frank, was brought to life by Wally Sage to strengthen the Cult of Immortus.

== Michelle Torres ==
Michelle Torres is an ex-lover of Deadshot (Floyd Lawton) and the mother of Zoe Lawton. She was created by Christos Gage and Steven Cummings, and made her first appearance in Deadshot vol. 2 #1 (February 2005).

=== Michelle Torres in other media ===
- An amalgamated character hybridized with Susan Lawton named Susie Lawton appears in the Arrow episode "Suicidal Tendencies", portrayed by Erika Walter. This version is the wife of Floyd Lawton and the mother of Zoe Lawton.
- Michelle Torres appears in the novelization of Suicide Squad. This version is the estranged wife of Floyd Lawton and the mother of Zoe Lawton.

== Touch-N-Go ==
Touch-N-Go (Amelinda Lopez) was a street thief in Chicago who was struck by a vehicle when trying to steal the purse of Kord Industries worker Melody Case and ended up in the ICU. Mento's men abduct Lopez, who is infused with promethium. Lopez gains the ability to absorb kinetic energy and joins Mento's group, Hybrid, as Touch-N-Go.

== Toy ==
Toy was the only surviving candidate for the second iteration of the Brotherhood of Dada gathered by Mr. Nobody. She arrived late the day Mr. Nobody enacted his plan, and found all the members of the Brotherhood already dead.

== Toymaster ==
Toymaster is the name of several characters appearing in American comic books published by DC Comics.

=== Robby Reed villain ===
The first Toymaster is an enemy of Robby Reed who uses toy-based gimmicks.

=== Supergirl villain ===
The second Toymaster was an Earth-based villain who is imprisoned in the Phantom Zone and makes use of robotic toys. He and his fellow villains Inventor and L. Finn are freed by Black Flame to fight Supergirl. They are defeated by Supergirl and returned to the Phantom Zone.

=== Toymaster in other media ===
- The first incarnation of Toymaster (spelled Toy Master) appears in the Teen Titans Go! episode "Collect Them All", voiced by John DiMaggio.
- An original incarnation of Toymaster appears in Justice League vs. Teen Titans, voiced by Steve Blum. This version is a member of the Legion of Doom.
  - The digital tie-in comic to The Death of Superman reveals Toymaster to be an android created by Winslow Schott.

== Trajectory ==
- First appearance: 52 #9 (August 2006)
- Created by: Geoff Johns, Grant Morrison, Greg Rucka, Mark Waid
- Abilities: Superspeed
- Aliases: Eliza Harmon
- Further reading: Trajectory at the Comic Book DB (archived from the original); Trajectory at the Grand Comics Database

Trajectory (Eliza Harmon) was originally from Manchester, Alabama, and a fan of the Flash and Kid Flash. She was selected to participate in the Everyman Project and joins Infinity, Inc. She successfully becomes a speedster, but she is unable to decelerate without the use of the drug Sharp. Trajectory maintains her place on Infinity Inc. with Natasha Irons's help until Lex Luthor disables her powers, leading to Trajectory being killed by the third Blockbuster.

=== Trajectory in other media ===
- Eliza Harmon / Trajectory appears in a self-titled episode of The Flash, portrayed by Allison Paige. This version is a scientist at Mercury Labs who helped Caitlin Snow develop the Velocity-9 formula, which she reverse-engineered to use for herself. Manifesting an alternate personality called "Trajectory" to justify her actions, she wreaks havoc in Central City until the Flash defeats her. Trajectory takes another dose of Velocity-9 and disintegrates.
- Trajectory appears in Young Justice, voiced by Zehra Fazal.

== Tremor ==
Tremor is a name shared by multiple characters appearing in American comic books published by DC Comics..

=== David Hsu ===
David Hsu is a supervillain and enemy of Fly (Jason Troy).

=== Second version ===
The second Tremor is a supervillain and member of the Superior Five. He was a sinister counterpart of Awkwardman of the Inferior Five. Together with his teammates, he was exiled on Salvation.

=== Roshanna Chatterji ===
Roshanna Chatterji is a superhero and member of The Movement. She is asexual.

== Tribulus ==
Tribulus is a mindless brute who was part of a bounty hunter team in pursuit of Vril Dox. Dox managed to sway him onto his R.E.B.E.L.S. team by stealing the cortical implant used to control Tribulus. Tribulus assisted the team into defeating Starro and became Dox's bodyguard.

== Trogg ==
Trogg is a Santa Prisca inmate who once saved Bane from an abusive inmate. Trogg, Bane, Bird, and Zombie all escaped one day and went to Gotham City to begin Bane's master plan at the start of the "Batman: Knightfall" storyline and helped to maintain the maintenance of Bane's Venom drug pump. Trogg assists Bane in destroying Arkham Asylum, causing a mass prison break.

After Bane had defeated Batman and begun his rise for power, Trogg joined Bird and Zombie in taking out potential rivals and recruiting others to serve Bane. Catwoman declines their offer. When a new Batman emerges, the three investigate and are beaten by Batman.

In post-Rebirth continuity, Trogg is Bane's demolition expert.

=== Trogg in other media ===
Trogg appears in the Kite Man: Hell Yeah! episode "Prison Break, Hell Yeah!".

== Tsunami ==
Tsunami is the name of two characters appearing in American comic books published by DC Comics.

=== Miya Shimada ===
- First appearance: All-Star Squadron #33 (May 1984)
- Created by: Roy Thomas and Rick Hoberg
- Abilities: Superhuman strength; able to swim at superhuman speed, ability to create and control tidal waves
- Aliases: Miya Shimada
- Further reading: Tsunami at the Comic Book DB (archived from the original); Tsunami at the Grand Comics Database

The character first appeared in All-Star Squadron #33 (May 1984), and was created by Roy Thomas and Rick Hoberg.

Miya Shimadi is a Nisei who grew up in Santa Barbara, California, prior to World War II. Due to prejudice against Japanese-Americans, she suffered in the period leading up to the entry of America into the war and joins the cause of the Imperial Japanese government. Over time, she becomes disillusioned by the dishonorable conduct of those she is working with and eventually changes sides. In stories set in contemporary settings, she has a daughter named Debbie with Neptune Perkins.

=== Second version ===
The second Tsunami is a supervillain who was created by Robby Reed's Master form from the cell sample of an unidentified human. She can create tidal waves and was partnered with fellow creation Distortionex. Both villains were defeated by Chris King and Vicki Grant.

=== Tsunami in other media ===
- The Miya Shimada incarnation of Tsunami appears as a character summon in Scribblenauts Unmasked: A DC Comics Adventure.
- The Miya Shimada incarnation of Tsunami makes a cameo appearance in the Kite Man: Hell Yeah! episode "Portal Potty, Hell Yeah!".

== Tusk ==
Tusk is the name of several characters appearing in American comic books published by DC Comics.

=== John Brandt ===
John Brandt is a businessman-turned-criminal who possesses tusks. He plotted revenge against the business partners who cheated him and was defeated by Atom.

=== Second version ===
The second Tusk is a New God of Apokolips who works for Darkseid under the rank of Commander.

=== Third version ===
The third Tusk is an unnamed metahuman crime lord who possesses elephant-like skin and tusks.

=== Tusk in other media ===
The third incarnation of Tusk appears in Batman: Bad Blood, voiced by John DiMaggio.

== Typhoon ==
Typhoon is the name of several characters appearing in American comic books published by DC Comics.

=== First version ===
The first Typhoon is an agent of O.G.R.E. and lover of the criminal Huntress. The pair battle Aquaman and Mera, who discover that they are working for the organization under threat of death. Mera persuades Typhoon and Huntress to turn on their masters.

=== David Drake ===
- First appearance: The Flash #294 (February 1981)
- Created by: Gerry Conway, Jim Starlin
- Abilities: Weather manipulation
- Further reading: Typhoon at the Comic Book DB (archived from the original)

David Drake, the second incarnation of Typhoon, was created by Gerry Conway and Jim Starlin and first appeared in Flash #294 (February 1981).

David Drake is a research scientist at Concordance Research who works with fellow scientist Martin Stein to develop a new bathysphere prototype. Drake designs the housing of the bathysphere, while Stein develops the bathysphere's nuclear power source. Following a nuclear explosion, Drake gains the ability to manipulate weather and goes on to become an enemy of Firestorm.

In Infinite Crisis and Forever Evil, Typhoon appears as a member of the Secret Society of Super Villains. In Final Crisis, he is among the villains controlled by the Anti-Life Equation.

In Doomsday Clock, David Drake is retroactively established to have been a metahuman whose powers were activated in a "controlled accident" orchestrated by the Department of Metahuman Affairs after he was discovered to have the metagene.

=== Powers and abilities of Typhoon ===
Typhoon generates a whirlwind around the lower half of his body that enables him to fly or hover. Typhoon can also project lightning from his fingertips, channeling the energy at times as powerful electric blasts. Typhoon can also generate storms of tremendous strength that generate tornadoes and driving hail. Typhoon can also grow in size relevant to size of the storm system he is generating. At times, he has grown larger than a skyscraper when generating a storm system of sufficient strength.

== Tyrannko ==
Tyrannko is a character appearing in American comic books published by DC Comics. He first appeared in All-Star Superman #3 and was created by Grant Morrison and Frank Quitely.

Tyrannko is the Dino-Czar of a race of dinosauroid-like creatures called Subterranosauri and the father of Krull.

=== Tyrannko in other media ===
- Tyrannko appears in the My Adventures with Superman episode "Guess Who's Slammin' to Dinner", voiced by Darrell Brown. This version is the prince of the Subterranosauri and attacked the surface world due to humans burrowing into his domain. Superboy talks Tyrannko down, resulting in peace between the humans and the Subterranosauri.
- Tyrannko appears in All-Star Superman, voiced by an uncredited Kevin Michael Richardson.
