= Bekka =

Publication information
- Publisher: DC Comics
- First appearance: DC Graphic Novel #4: The Hunger Dogs (March 1985)
- Created by: Jack Kirby

In-story information
- Species: New God
- Place of origin: New Genesis
- Team affiliations: New Gods; Justice League; Sinestro Corps
- Abilities: Immortality; Superhuman physical attributes; Highly skilled armed and unarmed combatant; Flight; Powers of desire/Love induction and healing touch; Empathy; Uses Yellow Lantern power ring and Mother Box

Bekka is a superheroine appearing in media published by DC Comics, primarily in stories set in Jack Kirby's Fourth World and DC's main shared universe, known as the DC Universe. She first appeared in DC Graphic Novel #4: The Hunger Dogs (1985), and was created by Jack Kirby.

== Fictional character biography ==
Bekka is the daughter of Himon. She is one of the New Gods whose achievements include the invention of the sentient Mother Box computers and the discovery of the "x-element" that fuels Metron's Mobius Chair. For many years, Bekka lived with her father in secret on Apokolips as Himon organized a rebellion against Darkseid's rule. After encountering and healing a wounded Orion, Himon and Bekka aided Orion in freeing his mother Tigra from imprisonment, during which Himon is seemingly killed.

In the storyline "Torment" in Superman/Batman #37–42 (August 2007–January 2008), Bekka and Batman help Superman escape from DeSaad's captivity on the planet Tartaros. During the rescue mission, she and Batman fall in love and her affection causes Batman to reflect on the lack of love he has forced himself to endure. Bekka likens her spell of desire to a siren's call but says that it affects her as well. In the end, she leaves with Orion when he comes to get her. In her home, while thinking that, staying with Orion, she will forget Batman, some unknown person approaches her, and she is then apparently killed as part of Death of the New Gods. In Death of the New Gods, it is initially revealed that her killer, and the killer of all the New Gods, is Infinity-Man disguised as Himon.

=== The New 52 ===
In September 2011, DC Comics rebooted the continuity of its books in an initiative called The New 52. In this new timeline, Bekka was born a daughter of New Genesis scientist Himon and possesses a subconscious power over the emotional attraction in others, one so powerful that not only would people uncontrollably fight over her affections or follow her lead to a fault. Men and women alike could and would do anything she asked of them, inadvertently making her life rather harsh. Eventually this charm drew the attentions of Izaya, current and longstanding leader of the New Gods. So potent was this charm that, while he was resistant to it, he could see the potential it would have on the battlefield.

Bekka is presented within the cities of New Genesis among a council of elite new gods under the direct command of Highfather called "The Council of Eight" serving as a member of his elite warrior guard. When called forth at the command of their monarch, Bekka communes secretly with Orion regarding his approach towards recruiting the lanterns and acquisition of the Life Equation. After a quick reprimand by Highfather, the Council is dispatched across the Prime Earth universe to retrieve a ring from the various lantern sects.

Bekka being dispatched to New Korugar where the Sinestro Corps reside, after having dispatched Arkillo with lopping off some fingers and taking his ring, she heads back to New Genesis; all while garnering the interests of their leader Thaal Sinestro. After handing her ring in along with the others to Izaya, they head out to test this new power they have acquired in the belief that the Seven Lights will yield the ultimate power he seeks. But when this test fails after trying to convert a gutter slum planet into a vessel for the new gods only to create horrendous monsters in their wake, her sovereign orders the Council to find the White Lantern. The White Lantern was then in possession of what he desires and to seek out the rest of the Light Wielders to corral as well as contain deeming them too dangerous to be left loose. Bekka and her vanguard are found on the planet Nok laying siege to the Indigo Tribe. She begs their leader Indigo-1 to surrender nearly winning her over using her power only then to be blasted by the oncoming Sinestro Corps. Bekka and her forces soon retake the advantage, killing dozens of Yellow Lanterns in the ensuing battle. Sinestro sees potential in Bekka and recruits her into the Sinestro Corps.

== Powers and abilities ==
As a New God, Bekka is nigh-immortal and possesses superhuman physical abilities. She can heal others and manipulate and amplify their emotions. Furthermore, Bekka is a skilled swordfighter and wields a Mother Box and yellow power ring.

== In other media ==
Wonder Woman as she appears in Justice League: Gods and Monsters.

- An alternate universe version of Bekka appears as Wonder Woman in Justice League: Gods and Monsters, voiced by Tamara Taylor. This version married Orion as part of a peace treaty between their respective families and planets of New Genesis and Apokolips. However, Bekka's family killed Orion and his family, forcing her to escape using a Mother Box that Orion gifted her. After arriving on Earth, Bekka is her universe's Wonder Woman and a founding member of the Justice League before returning to space to face her past.
- The Gods and Monsters incarnation of Wonder Woman appears in the Justice League: Gods and Monsters Chronicles episode "Big", voiced again by Tamara Taylor.
- Bekka appears as a character summon in Scribblenauts Unmasked: A DC Comics Adventure.
