= Mantis (DC Comics) =

- Mantis as depicted in New Gods #2 (1971). Art by Jack Kirby.

Publication information
- Publisher: DC Comics
- First appearance: Forever People #2 (June 1971)
- Created by: Jack Kirby

In-story information
- Alter ego: Unknown
- Species: New Gods
- Place of origin: Apokolips
- Team affiliations: Darkseid's Elite
- Abilities: Immortality; Superhuman strength, durability, speed, and reflexes; Energy absorption, manipulation and projection; Ability to generate heat, cold and anti-matter; Flight; Teleportation

Mantis is a supervillain appearing in comic books published by DC Comics, part of Jack Kirby's New Gods series.

== Publication history ==
Mantis first appeared in Forever People #2 (June 1971) and was created by writer-artist Jack Kirby.

== Fictional character biography ==
Mantis is the leader of a colony of humanoid insects who migrated from New Genesis. In return for his fealty, Darkseid gives him great power. Mantis spends much of his time in a power pod recharging his energy, but can also absorb energy manually. Mantis has at times served as Darkseid's lackey, becoming a founding member of the Secret Society of Super-Villains. Like many of the denizens of Apokolips, he has occasionally risen up against Darkseid.

Mantis is featured in the limited series Death of the New Gods, where he allies with Darkseid's son Kalibak to battle Superman and Himon. During the battle, the Infinity-Man, acting as an agent for the Source, kills Mantis and Kalibak by removing their hearts. Mantis returns following The New 52 relaunch, which rebooted the continuity of the DC Comics universe.

== Powers and abilities ==
Mantis is an energy vampire who can project tremendous blasts of energy and absorb virtually any form of energy or power source. Mantis can also teleport and generate boom tubes which enable him to teleport others. Mantis can also sense and detect energy, enabling him to sense opponents who are invisible and strike those who are intangible.

Mantis possesses a "thermal touch" which enables him to generate heat and he can create "frigi-blocks" which trap opponents in ice. Mantis' most dangerous power is his ability to generate antimatter, which allows him to destroy anything he touches.

== In other media ==
=== Television ===
- Mantis appears in Justice League Unlimited, voiced by an uncredited J.K. Simmons.
- Mantis appears in Batman: The Brave and the Bold, voiced by Wade Williams.
- Mantis appears in Young Justice, voiced by Andrew Kishino. This version possesses a more insectoid appearance.

=== Film ===
- An alternative universe version of Mantis appears in Justice League: Gods and Monsters.
- Mantis makes a non-speaking cameo appearance in Injustice.

=== Video games ===
- Mantis appears as a character summon in Scribblenauts Unmasked: A DC Comics Adventure.
- Mantis appears as a boss and playable character in Lego DC Super-Villains, voiced by Lex Lang.

=== Miscellaneous ===
Mantis appears in DC x Sonic the Hedgehog.
