= Lightray (character) =

DC Comics hero

- Lightray as depicted in New Gods #2 (April 1971). Art by Jack Kirby

Publication information
- Publisher: DC Comics
- First appearance: New Gods #1 (February 1971)
- Created by: Jack Kirby (writer/artist)

In-story information
- Alter ego: Solis
- Species: New God
- Place of origin: New Genesis
- Team affiliations: New Gods; Justice League; Justice League International
- Abilities: Immortality; Invulnerability; Superhuman physical attributes; Light-speed flight; Solar manipulation; Solar generation; Sun Creation; Carries a Mother Box

Lightray (Solis) is a DC Comics superhero. Created by Jack Kirby for the Jack Kirby's Fourth World meta-series, he first appeared in New Gods #1 (February 1971). Lightray was a major character in New Gods volume 1 (1971–1978), as well as volume 2 (1984), volume 3 (1989–1991) and volume 4 (1995–1997). He has also appeared with Orion in the Cosmic Odyssey limited series (1988–1989), Jack Kirby's Fourth World (1997–1998) and Orion (2000–2002).

Seven years after the character's creation, Lightray's origin story was revealed in DC Special Series #10, a Secret Origins of Super-Heroes issue published in January 1978.

The version of the character in current DC continuity was introduced in Green Lantern/New Gods: Godhead #1 (December 2014).

== Characterization ==
For the fourth volume of New Gods created in 1995, Rachel Pollack and Tom Peyer discussed with Back Issue! magazine how Lightray changed after Orion kills Darkseid in issue #2:

The most telling effect of this event is that it drives many of the residents of New Genesis slightly insane, none more so than Lightray, who becomes extremely violent and seems to enjoy cruelty. In their first issue, the writing duo had emphasized Lightray's... lightness, if you will, making him a very jovial, happy character. As it turns out, this was not an accident. "To me, Lightray is not so much childish as innocent. He sees only the light", Pollack tells Back Issue. "That's why he was so easily corrupted". Tom Peyer agrees, feeling: "I think the main purpose Kirby gave Lightray was to make Orion seem grim and dark by comparison. So we probably played Lightray's notes loudly to make the contrast obvious".

Orion writer Walt Simonson said that his conception of Lightray and Orion was based on the relationship that Kirby established in New Gods volume 1. In 2018, Simonson said: "I saw Lightray as a strategist, whereas Orion is more a tactician. Jack actually had Orion refer to Lightray as a planner at the climax of the Deep Six story, "The Glory Boat!" (New Gods #6, Jan. 1972). I tried basing my notions of Lightray primarily on that story".

In Superheroes of the Round Table, Jason Tondro characterizes Lightray's place in Kirby's New Gods work: "We have characters like... the amazing Lightray, a denizen of New Genesis who embodies light with all of its creativity, bright humor, and intelligence... Lightray embodies illumination". Tondro says Lightray "and other characters, both good and evil, hint at the full dimensions of Kirby's epic pantheon".

== Fictional character biography ==
Cover art for Countdown #48, art by Andy Kubert.

Lightray is the shining star of New Genesis and a high-spirited New God. Unlike his grim friend Orion, Lightray is cheerful and optimistic and prefers to solve problems through compromise rather than combat. He uses the speed of light to his advantage in eluding foes.

Lightray joins the Justice League with Orion when a membership drive fails to find other new recruits. In JLA (1999), Superman disbands the Justice League, thus ending Lightray's membership.

In Countdown #48, Lightray falls to Earth after a fight with an unknown entity, who is later revealed to be Infinity-Man. He dies holding Jimmy Olsen's hand, repeating the word "infinite" and glowing brighter. In Final Crisis #7, Lightray is resurrected after New Genesis is restored.

In post-Rebirth continuity, Solis was assumed to have been born without powers. Highfather encouraged him and Orion to become friends, ensuring that Orion would have somebody who saw him for who he was rather than as a god or demon. One day, Orion and Solis encountered a group of warriors from Apokolips who had infiltrated New Genesis. Solis was gravely wounded in the ensuing battle, but refused to die and healed himself through his will to live.

In New Gods (vol. 5), Lightray is killed by Karok Ator, a claimant to the throne of Apokolips following Darkseid's death. The Black Racer takes his spirit into the Source.

== Powers and abilities ==
As a New God, Lightray is nigh-immortal and possesses superhuman physical abilities. He possesses the ability to fly at light speed and generate bursts of solar energy.

== Other versions ==
- Lightstray, an alternate universe funny animal version of Lightray, appears in Captain Carrot and the Final Ark.
- An alternate universe version of Lightray makes a cameo appearance in JLA: The Nail.
- Bald'r, a fusion of Lightray and Marvel Comics character Balder, appears in the Amalgam Comics one-shot Thorion of the New Asgods.

== Influence ==
Jack Kirby's 1971 design for Lightray's costume influenced artist Al Milgrom's creation of Firestorm in 1978. In a 2019 interview, Milgrom admitted: "The facemask on Firestorm, the way it comes around the chin, was probably inspired by Lightray more than anything... I liked the [Lightray] head-covering thing; I said, "I'm stealin' it!"

A July 1971 New Gods story featuring Lightray has been noted as an example of racial bias in 1970s superhero storytelling. In "Death and the Black Racer" (New Gods #3), Lightray — a blond white man — is running desperately to escape the Black Racer, portrayed as a person of color. José Alaniz and Scott T. Smith noted in Uncanny Bodies: Superhero Comics and Disability that the story "suggests a racial dichotomy... in which blackness presents as a threatening force".

== In other media ==
=== Television ===
- Lightray appears in series set in the DC Animated Universe (DCAU):
  - Lightray makes a non-speaking cameo appearance in the Superman: The Animated Series episode "Legacy".
  - Lightray appears in the Justice League episode "Twilight", voiced by Rob Paulsen.
  - Lightray makes a non-speaking cameo appearance in the Justice League Unlimited episode "Destroyer".
- Lightray was originally planned to appear in the Harley Quinn episode "Inner (Para) Demons", where Darkseid would have killed him for his incompetence, but DC Comics objected and his cameo was replaced by Forager.
- Lightray appears in Young Justice, voiced by Nolan North.

=== Film ===
An alternate universe version of Lightray appears in Justice League: Gods and Monsters.

=== Video games ===
Lightray appears as a character summon in Scribblenauts Unmasked: A DC Comics Adventure.
