= DeSaad =

DC Comics character

- DeSaad taken from the DC Comics website's character page. Art by Walter Simonson

Publication information
- Publisher: DC Comics
- First appearance: Forever People #2 (May 1971)
- Created by: Jack Kirby

In-story information
- Alter ego: DeSaad
- Species: New God
- Place of origin: Apokolips
- Team affiliations: Darkseid's Elite
- Notable aliases: Doctor Dezard, the God of Torture, the Grand Director
- Abilities: Nigh-Immortality; Superhuman strength, endurance and reflexes; Telepathy; Energy absorption and teleportation; Brilliant inventor of weapons and torture devices

DeSaad (also spelled Desaad) is a supervillain, appearing in books published by DC Comics. He is one of the followers of Darkseid from the planet Apokolips in Jack Kirby's Fourth World meta-series.

As DeSaad serves as Darkseid's master torturer, his name refers to the Marquis de Sade. For a period, DeSaad had an assistant, Justeen, a reference to de Sade's novel Justine, although she bore little resemblance to the title character.

Steve Byers portrays DeSaad in the television series Smallville. The character made his cinematic debut in Zack Snyder's Justice League (2021), portrayed through voice and motion capture by Peter Guinness.

== Publication history ==
DeSaad first appeared in Forever People #2 (April–May 1971) and was created by Jack Kirby.

== Fictional character biography ==
Darkseid with a young DeSaad, art by Colleen Doran.

DeSaad was originally a New God from New Genesis who was manipulated by Darkseid, leader of Apokolips. Darkseid tricked DeSaad into believing that his cat had killed his other pet, a bird. Goading the boy to avenge the bird, Darkseid manipulates the youth into burying the cat alive. The bird returns, having flown off; in a rage, DeSaad kills the bird and leaves New Genesis to become Darkseid's lackey.

DeSaad is seemingly killed during an attempt by Darkseid to penetrate the Source. He is subsequently found to have "bonded" with Orion, causing the latter to become cruel and manipulative. The two are later separated. While missing, DeSaad's second-in-command, Justeen, plots to overthrow him and become closer to her beloved Darkseid.

In Countdown to Final Crisis, DeSaad captures and tortures Martin Stein in an attempt to take the power of Firestorm for himself. When Jason Rusch arrives to rescue Stein, DeSaad hijacks the Firestorm matrix and takes control of it. DeSaad is defeated and separated from the Firestorm matrix by Atomic Knight, but flees before he can be captured.

After disrupting a battle between Darkseid and Mary Marvel, DeSaad gives Darkseid a compound that was unsuccessfully used to access the Anti-Life Equation. DeSaad is then released from Darkseid's service, but he has transported the Pied Piper to Apokolips as Brother Eye arrives. DeSaad claims the Piper can channel the Anti-Life Equation and control the planet. Before the Piper can do so, Brother Eye finishes assimilating Apokolips. After recovering, DeSaad confesses to masterminding the Trickster and the Piper's ordeal.

In Salvation Run, DeSaad oversees the training of the New Gods of Apokolips on Cygnus 4019, a planet where many villains had been imprisoned. When he discovers the villains on this planet, DeSaad arranges for the Parademons to eliminate the least powerful villains so that he can train the stronger ones for an unknown goal. Ultimately, the villains escape back to Earth.

Following Death of the New Gods, many of the fallen Apokoliptian gods had taken on human forms. DeSaad, posing as Doctor Bud Fogel, raises the public against Lex Luthor's Everyman experiments, eventually trapping and capturing Infinity, Inc. DeSaad makes further appearances in the series Terror Titans, where he conditions the Infinitors to fight in the Dark Side Club's metahuman tournament. After the brainwashed superhumans break free of the Anti-Life Equation, DeSaad is electrocuted and captured by Static.

=== The New 52 ===
DeSaad is reintroduced following The New 52 relaunch, which rebooted the continuity of the DC Comics universe. During Darkseid's first incursion on Earth, DeSaad appears in Apokolips discussing with Steppenwolf about cloning the DNA of a captured and tortured Superman to create a new race of Parademon. Five years later, he impersonates Michael Holt and attempts to capture Power Girl.

== Powers and abilities ==
As a New God, DeSaad is nigh-immortal, being long-lived and immune to diseases and toxins. DeSaad is an inventor of weapons and a master of torture. DeSaad has created many torture machines and devices.

In The New 52, DeSaad is strong and resistant enough to lift several tons easily and face powerful beings like Power Girl. In addition, he has a high level of invulnerability and is functionally immortal. DeSaad's powers include telepathy, absorption and control of emotions. DeSaad is able to enter people's minds to manipulate their emotions and feed on their worst feelings; even without manipulating them, he becomes more powerful. He has demonstrated the ability to create illusions either in its real form or in the form of other people. Another of his powers is the absorption of energy; he can feed on different types of energy and even manipulate it.

== Other versions ==
- An alternate universe version of DeSaad makes a cameo appearance in JLA: The Nail #1.
- An elderly DeSaad appears in Kingdom Come as a servant of Orion.
- L'ok D'saad, a composite character based on DeSaad and Marvel Comics character Loki, appears in the Amalgam Comics one-shot Thorion of the New Asgods.
- DeSaad appears in DC x Sonic the Hedgehog.

== In other media ==
=== Television ===
- DeSaad appears in the Super Friends franchise, voiced by René Auberjonois.
- DeSaad appears in the Superman: The Animated Series episode "Father's Day", voiced by Robert Morse.
- DeSaad appears in Justice League (2001), voiced again by René Auberjonois. In the episode "Twilight", Darkseid kills DeSaad for criticizing his military action to gain the Anti-Life Equation.
- DeSaad appears in the tenth season of Smallville, portrayed by Steve Byers. This version owns a fetish club franchise called "Club DeSaad" and possesses several psionic powers, such as telekinesis, which he uses to manipulate and corrupt people. Throughout the series, he serves Darkseid until he is killed by Green Arrow in the series finale.
- DeSaad appears in Young Justice, voiced by Dee Bradley Baker. This version is an ally of the Light and a weapons supplier for Intergang.
- DeSaad appears in Justice League Action, voiced by Jason J. Lewis. This version commands several spaceships crewed by Parademons and wields a Mother Box housed in his belt.
- DeSaad appears in Kite Man: Hell Yeah!, voiced by Phil LaMarr.

=== Film ===
DeSaad as depicted in Zack Snyder's Justice League

- DeSaad appears in Justice League: War, voiced by Bruce Thomas. This version oversees the process that transforms captured species into Parademons. He is later killed by Superman, who became unstable and aggressive after being partially subjected to the process.
- An alternate universe version of DeSaad makes a non-speaking appearance in Justice League: Gods and Monsters.
- DeSaad appears in Lego DC Comics Super Heroes: Justice League vs. Bizarro League, voiced by James Arnold Taylor.
- DeSaad was meant to appear in Justice League (2017), voiced and motion-captured by Peter Guinness, before his scenes were removed from the theatrical cut. He would later appear in the director's cut Zack Snyder's Justice League.

=== Video games ===
- DeSaad appears in Lego Batman 3: Beyond Gotham via downloadable content, voiced by Robin Atkin Downes.
- DeSaad appears as a boss in DC Universe Online.
- DeSaad appears as a character summon in Scribblenauts Unmasked: A DC Comics Adventure.
- DeSaad makes a non-speaking cameo appearance in Darkseid's ending in Injustice 2.
- DeSaad appears as a playable character in Lego DC Super-Villains, voiced by Dee Bradley Baker.

=== Merchandise ===
- DeSaad received a figure in Kenner's Super Powers Collection.
- DeSaad received a figure in Mattel's DC Universe Classics line.
- DeSaad, based on his appearance in Zack Snyder's Justice League, received a 1/4 scale polystone sculpture from Wētā Workshop Collectibles.
