= Oberon (comics) =

Publication information
- Publisher: DC Comics
- First appearance: Mister Miracle #1 (March 1971)
- Created by: Jack Kirby

In-story information
- Alter ego: Oberon Kurtzberg
- Team affiliations: Justice League; New Gods; Justice League International
- Supporting character of: Mister Miracle

Oberon is a character appearing in comic books published by DC Comics, primarily in association with Mister Miracle. He was created by Jack Kirby, and first appeared in Mister Miracle #1 (March 1971).

== Fictional character biography ==
Oberon is orphaned as a child after his family is killed in a fire. He later works at a circus under an abusive ringmaster before meeting Thaddeus Brown, the first Mister Miracle, and becoming his assistant. After an Intergang operative kills Brown, Oberon works with his successor, the New God Scott Free. Oberon agrees to become Free's partner and manager and plans his performances.

When Mister Miracle becomes a member of the Justice League International, Oberon becomes the right-hand man of Maxwell Lord. Shilo Norman, Scott Free's successor, encounters Oberon's alleged daughter, who claims Oberon abandoned her mother back during his carnival days. Oberon, Barda and Scott all attend Green Arrow and Black Canary's wedding.

The majority of the New Gods are killed by Infinity-Man during the Death of the New Gods storyline, with Mister Miracle and Barda being among Infinity-Man's victims. After Mister Miracle's death and before his resurrection, Oberon works with the Meta-Movers, a professional wrecking crew.

In Mister Miracle (vol. 4), Miracle discovers that Oberon died from cancer some time prior.

== Other versions ==
- An alternate timeline version of Oberon appears in Justice League Annual (1995).
- An alternate universe version of Oberon appears in Justice League 3000 #14.

== In other media ==
- Oberon appears in the Justice League Unlimited episode "The Ties That Bind", voiced by Dick Miller.
- Oberon appears in the teaser of the Batman: The Brave and the Bold episode "Last Bat on Earth!", voiced by Dee Bradley Baker.
- Oberon makes a non-speaking cameo appearance in the Harley Quinn episode "Inner (Para) Demons".
- Oberon appears in Lego DC Super Hero Girls: Super-Villain High, voiced by Maurice LaMarche.
- Oberon appears as a character summon in Scribblenauts Unmasked: A DC Comics Adventure.
