= Izaya =

Izaya may refer to:

- Izaya, also known as Infinity-Man, a character in DC Comics
- Izaya the Inheritor, also known as Highfather, a character in DC Comics
- Izaya Orihara, a character in the light novel series Durarara!!
