= Takion =

- Takion as depicted in Takion #6 (November 1996). Art by Aaron Lopresti.

Publication information
- Publisher: DC Comics
- First appearance: Takion #1 (June 1996)
- Created by: Paul Kupperberg (writer); Aaron Lopresti (artist)

In-story information
- Alter ego: Joshua Saunders
- Team affiliations: New Gods
- Notable aliases: Highfather
- Abilities: Avatar of the Source: Omniscience/cosmic awareness; Quantum field manipulation; Emotional spectrum manipulation; Speed Force manipulation; Energy manipulation; Matter manipulation; Reality manipulation; Space-time manipulation; Telepathy; Telekinesis; Immortality

Takion (Joshua Saunders) is a superhero appearing in American comic books published by DC Comics. The character was created by Paul Kupperberg and Aaron Lopresti, first appearing in an eponymous series in 1996 that lasted for 7 issues.

== Publication history ==
In 2019, Kupperberg wrote about the creation of Takion on his website, stating:

"Unbeknownst to me and Dan [Thorsland], over in editor Archie Goodwin's office, a very different version of Starman was in development with writer James Robinson and artist Tony Harris. It only became beknownst when we fed our Starman proposal into the pipeline for review by the senior editors our Starman was bounced like a Spalding. Instead of just chalking it up to experience and sticking the proposal in a drawer, Dan suggested we salvage what we could from it and use that as a foundation to create an entirely new character. This we did and, after a bunch of talking and a few drafts, "Will Payton…Starman" became "Josh Saunders...Takion".

== Fictional character biography ==
Josh Saunders

Josh Saunders, a blind psychologist, is chosen by Highfather to become a Source Elemental and given the ability to manipulate the Source, which Highfather says must be cleansed. In reality, Takion was created as an avatar of Highfather to resurrect him in the event of Highfather's death.

Takion possesses omniscience, but has to filter this awareness and the information he receives using the weaker perception of a human brain. He later learns to separate the future and past from the present, allowing him to use his powers without them overwhelming him.

Takion's main nemesis is Stayne, a nameless human woman transformed by Darkseid's power. She is sent to keep Takion from achieving his true potential and to prevent him from learning about Darkseid's plan to destroy the Source Wall.

During the Genesis event, Highfather is killed by Ares. After Izaya's death, the role of Highfather is offered to Scott Free (Mister Miracle), Izaya's only living heir. Scott turns the offer down, leaving Takion to become the new Highfather.

During Death of the New Gods, Takion is killed by Infinity-Man after he and Himon attempt to investigate his murder of several New Gods.

== Powers and abilities ==
A living embodiment of the Source, Takion serves as a conduit and avatar between the Source and the New Gods of New Genesis. Takion's only limit is the amount of energy existing in the Source; he cannot create new energy, but can channel and manipulate existing forms of energy. Takion is also able to manipulate time, become intangible, and teleport.

== In other media ==
Takion appears as a character summon in Scribblenauts Unmasked: A DC Comics Adventure.
