= Jezebelle =

- Jezebelle, artist Rich Buckler

Publication information
- Publisher: DC Comics
- First appearance: New Gods #12 (July 1977)
- Created by: Gerry Conway (writer); Don Newton (artist)

In-story information
- Alter ego: Jezebelle
- Species: New God
- Place of origin: Apokolips
- Team affiliations: New Genesis
- Notable aliases: Jezebelle of the Fiery Eyes
- Abilities: Heat vision, flight

Jezebelle is a superhero appearing in American comic books published by DC Comics. Created by Gerry Conway and Don Newton, the character first appeared in New Gods #12 (July 1977). She is the second female character in the series, after Big Barda.

== Fictional character biography ==
Jezebelle is originally from Apokolips, where she was one of Granny Goodness' students. Jezebelle was always depicted as being reluctant to kill, so when she was captured during a battle with New Genesis, she gladly defected.

In the third volume of New Gods, Jezebelle is killed by one of Necromina's "morrow blocks". but she was later seen alongside other supposedly dead New Gods Forager and Highfather in the series Seven Soldiers: Mister Miracle.

== Powers and abilities ==
As a New God, Jezebelle possesses superhuman physical abilities and is nigh-immortal. She is able to fire heat rays from her eyes, fly, and survive unprotected in space.
