= Dan Turpin =

- Dan Turpin as depicted in The Adventures of Superman #499 (Feb. 1993). Art by Tom Grummett.

Publication information
- Publisher: DC Comics
- First appearance: New Gods #5 (November 1971)
- Created by: Jack Kirby

In-story information
- Full name: Daniel Turpin
- Species: Human
- Team affiliations: Metropolis SCU
- Notable aliases: Terrible

Daniel "Terrible" Turpin is a character published by DC Comics. Created by Jack Kirby, he first appeared in New Gods #5 (November 1971).

Turpin is a supporting character of Superman and a member of the Metropolis police. Turpin has appeared in various media outside comics, primarily in association with Superman. Joseph Bologna voiced the character in Superman: The Animated Series, where he is modeled after Kirby.

== Fictional character biography ==
In Turpin's first appearance, he is one of the few citizens of Metropolis aware that a secretive war is taking place in the city between super-powered beings. When this war turns violent, Turpin's boss tries to take him off the case, but Turpin ignores him. Turpin leads the fight against the rampaging Kalibak, using the energy of the entire city to assist Lightray and Orion in defeating him. Turpin suffers multiple injuries but survives.

He keeps his job and becomes Lieutenant Inspector of the Metropolis Special Crimes Unit. In Superboy, Turpin is sent to Hawaii to investigate whether or not the state needs a Special Crimes Unit of its own. While initially skeptical, an attack by the Female Furies convinces Turpin that the islands need an SCU.

=== Final Crisis ===
Turpin returns in Final Crisis (2008). He had been called back from retirement to investigate the case of several missing kids; this evolves into investigating the death of the New God Orion. Orion passes on several cryptic phrases to Turpin, telling him that "He is in you all!" before dying.

Turpin follows clues given to him by Renee Montoya and the Mad Hatter, investigating the Dark Side Club and journeying to the devastated city of Blüdhaven. There, he meets up with Reverend Good, and begins to realize that "there's someone in [his] head".

Turpin, after much inner struggle, is turned into a host for Darkseid. Darkseid later reveals that he selected Turpin rather than Batman as a host because Batman would have resisted longer than he wished, while Turpin struggled just enough to make his victory sweeter.

Batman shoots Darkseid with a bullet made of Radion, which is poisonous to the New Gods. Barry Allen and Wally West manage to outrun the Black Racer so that it takes the currently-weakened Darkseid, freeing Turpin.

== Other versions ==
- An alternate universe version of Dan Turpin appears in Superman: The Dark Side.
- An alternate universe version of Dan Turpin appears in Superman's Metropolis. This version is a low-class worker and member of a revolution against Superman, who is the ruler of a dystopian Metropolis.
- Dan Turpin appears in Elseworld's Finest.

== In other media ==
=== Television ===
- Dan Turpin appears in Superman: The Animated Series, voiced by Joseph Bologna. This version is the leader of the Metropolis Special Crimes Unit who is physically modeled after Jack Kirby. In his last appearance in the television special "Apokolips, Now!", Turpin is killed by Darkseid after he loses his war on Earth.
- Dan Turpin appears in the Smallville episode "Bulletproof", portrayed by David Paetkau. This version is a rookie Metropolis police officer.

=== Film ===
- Dan Turpin makes a non-speaking cameo appearance in Superman: Unbound.
- Dan Turpin appears in The Death of Superman, voiced by Rick Pasqualone.

=== Video games ===
Dan Turpin appears as a character summon in Scribblenauts Unmasked: A DC Comics Adventure.

=== Miscellaneous ===
- Dan Turpin appears in the GraphicAudio production of Superman: The Never Ending Battle.
- The Smallville incarnation of Dan Turpin appears in Smallville Season 11.
- Dan Turpin appears in Injustice 2. After Superman is defeated and his Regime disassembled, Turpin is assigned to oversee his imprisonment before being killed by Talia al Ghul's daughter Athanasia.
