= Fourth World (comics) =

Comic storyline

"Fourth World" thematic stories
- The New Gods #1 (March 1971) featuring Orion. Cover art by Jack Kirby and Don Heck.
- Created by: Jack Kirby

Publication information
- Publisher: DC Comics
Title(s)
Superman's Pal Jimmy Olsen #133–148
New Gods #1–11
Forever People #1–11
Mister Miracle #1–18
The Hunger Dogs
- Formats: Multiple, thematically linked
- Genre: Science fiction, superhero
- Publication date: 1970–1973
- Number of issues: 59
- Main character(s): Darkseid; Mister Miracle; Orion; Forever People; Highfather; Lightray; Jimmy Olsen; Superman; Morgan Edge; Newsboy Legion; Guardian; Kalibak; DeSaad; Intergang; Big Barda; Granny Goodness; Oberon; Metron; Dan Turpin

Creative team
- Writer(s): Jack Kirby
- Artist(s): Jack Kirby

Reprints
- Collected editions
- Fourth World by Jack Kirby Omnibus: ISBN 1-4012-7475-7
- Omnibus Volume 1: ISBN 1-4012-1344-8
- Omnibus Volume 2: ISBN 140121357X
- Omnibus Volume 3: ISBN 1401214851
- Omnibus Volume 4: ISBN 1401215831

"Fourth World" is a metaseries of connected comic book titles written and drawn by Jack Kirby and published by DC Comics from 1970 to 1973. Although they were not marketed under this title until the August–September 1971 issues of New Gods and Forever People, the terms Fourth World and Jack Kirby's Fourth World have gained usage in the years since. Kirby created the Fourth World concept in the 1970s. The series is a science fiction-based mythology that revolves around ancient space deities known as the New Gods. The New Gods are similar to the pantheons of gods found in the lore of many Earth civilizations.

== Publication history ==
=== Initial 1970s comics ===
As the newsstand distribution system for comics began to break down, Jack Kirby foresaw a day when comics would need to find alternate venues for sale. Toward this end, Kirby envisioned a finite series that would be serialized and collected in one tome after the series had concluded. He began the "Fourth World" in Superman's Pal Jimmy Olsen #133 (Oct. 1970). DC Comics had planned to introduce the "Fourth World" titles in the November 1970 issue of their preview omnibus title, Showcase. Kirby reportedly objected to this, and Showcase was cancelled. This delayed the introduction of the "Fourth World" titles until the following year. The three original titles constituting the "Fourth World" were The Forever People, Mister Miracle, and The New Gods.

Unhappy with Marvel Comics at the time, as he had created a plethora of characters without having copyright or creative custody of them, Kirby turned to rival publisher DC Comics, with his sketches and designs for a new group of heroes and villains. He had first showed them to Stan Lee, who liked them, but wanted to fold them into already existing titles. So Kirby decided to keep them for himself. When Carmine Infantino visited Kirby and his family for Passover, he showed him his designs and ideas. Infantino told him that he wanted to bring them to DC. Worsening conditions at Marvel and promises from DC made Kirby decide to switch company. As author Marc Flores, who writes under the pen name Ronin Ro, described:

The idea of the New Gods had come to Jack years earlier, when he was plotting 90 percent of the "Tales of Asgard" stories in Thor. He wanted to have two planets at war and end with Ragnarok, the battle that would kill Thor's lucrative pantheon. Instead, he tried the idea in his Inhumans stories. Now he was presenting it in its original context. Though he wouldn't ever say it publicly, the New Gods books started right after the gods in Thor killed one another. The first page of Orion of the New Gods showed the same scenes from Thor—a planet torn in half and armored gods holding swords and dying on a fiery battleground.

Mister Miracle #1 (April 1971), cover art by Jack Kirby and Vince Colletta.

"The Fourth World" dealt with the battle between good and evil as represented by the worlds of New Genesis and Apokolips. Darkseid, the evil lord of Apokolips, seeks the Anti-Life Equation which will allow him to control the thoughts of all living beings. Opposing him is Orion, his son, who was raised on New Genesis. Other characters caught in the battle included the Forever People, an extension of the kid gang concept from the 1940s with a group of adolescents adventuring without an adult supervisor; Mister Miracle, a native of New Genesis raised on Apokolips who triumphed over a torturous childhood to become the world's greatest escape artist; and Lightray, the heroic warrior of New Genesis. Their adventures would take them to Earth where the war continued.

Comics historian Les Daniels observed in 1995 that "Kirby's mix of slang and myth, science fiction and the Bible, made for a heady brew, but the scope of his vision has endured". In 2007, comics writer Grant Morrison commented that "Kirby's dramas were staged across Jungian vistas of raw symbol and storm... The Fourth World saga crackles with the voltage of Jack Kirby's boundless imagination let loose onto paper".

The Fourth World characters reappeared in various titles. In 1976, the New Gods were featured in the last issue of 1st Issue Special. The New Gods series relaunched in July 1977, and with 1st Issue Special still a relatively recent publication, it picked up where the storyline of that issue left off. Although the title remained "The New Gods" in the indicia and retained its original numbering, launching with #12, the covers used the title "The Return of the New Gods". Gerry Conway wrote the series and Don Newton drew it. Mister Miracle teamed-up with Batman three times in The Brave and the Bold, and the Mister Miracle series was revived in September 1977 by Steve Englehart and Marshall Rogers. Steve Gerber and Michael Golden produced three issues ending with #25 (Sept. 1978), with several storylines unresolved. Mister Miracle teamed with Superman in DC Comics Presents #12 (Aug. 1979) and the New Gods met the Justice League of America and the Justice Society of America in Justice League of America #183–185 (Oct–Dec 1980). "The Great Darkness Saga" storyline in Legion of Super-Heroes vol. 2 featured the team battling Darkseid a thousand years in the future.

=== Origin of the name ===
Mark Evanier, who worked as Kirby's assistant in the 1970s and later wrote an award-winning Kirby biography, has said that there are multiple, mutually-exclusive explanations for why Kirby chose the name "Fourth World", adding that "if you'd asked Jack eight times, you'd have gotten eight more"; ultimately, Evanier concluded that none of the suggested explanations are plausible, and that it is most likely "just a term that popped into [Kirby's] head and he liked the sound of it. Later on, he came up with several different retroactive explanations".

=== 1984 reprint series ===
In 1984, DC Comics reprinted Jack Kirby's original 11 issues of The New Gods in a six-issue limited series. The first five issues each reprinted two consecutive issues of the original series. The mini-series' final issue was originally intended to include a reprint of New Gods vol. 1 #11 and a new 24-page story which would conclude the series and end with both Darkseid and Orion dead. DC editors prevented Kirby from using his original intended ending. Kirby instead turned in a one-off story called "On the Road to Armagetto" which was rejected as well, due to the fact that it did not contain a definitive ending to the series. A 48-page new story called "Even Gods Must Die" was published instead, serving as a prologue for The Hunger Dogs graphic novel, which was greenlit to conclude the series.

The Hunger Dogs was designed to give an ending to the story of the New Gods, while fulfilling editorial mandates that the New Gods be kept alive to ensure future use of the characters by later writers. It incorporated several pages from the unpublished "On the Road to Armagetto" story and brought Kirby's New Gods series to a close as the "hunger dogs", the citizens of Apokolips, overthrow Darkseid.

=== Later revivals ===
Concurrent with DC's New Gods reprint series in 1984, Kirby worked on two Super Powers comic book limited series for DC Comics in which he continued the Fourth World characters and mythology.

A Forever People miniseries was published in 1988. Mister Miracle was featured in Justice League International by J. M. DeMatteis and Keith Giffen and a series of his own written by DeMatteis. The Fourth World characters were prominently featured in Cosmic Odyssey, which led to a third New Gods series (February 1989 – August 1991), written by Mark Evanier, which fleshed out details about the history of many New Gods, most notably introducing Darkseid's father Yuga Khan. A fourth New Gods series was launched in October 1995, and a third Mister Miracle series in April 1996. Both of these were replaced in March 1997 by the Jack Kirby's Fourth World series, written and drawn by John Byrne. Walt Simonson wrote and drew an Orion solo series from June 2000 to June 2002.

Writer Grant Morrison used some of the Fourth World mythology in various titles they worked on, including their run on JLA, with Orion and Big Barda becoming members, and in the Seven Soldiers metaseries, in which the New Gods, especially Mister Miracle, played a major role. They are seen creating Aurakles, the first superhero.

The Death of the New Gods limited series (October 2007 – April 2008) was written and drawn by Jim Starlin. Final Crisis brought about the end of the Fourth World and the dawn of the Fifth as Darkseid was destroyed and several New Gods are resurrected.

With the reboot of the DC Universe following Flashpoint, the deaths of the New Gods and Darkseid have been removed from canon and the characters are still active. In particular, Darkseid and his uncle Steppenwolf and their attacks on the main DC Universe and Earth 2 play a major role in the rise of the superheroes: the Earth-2 versions of Superman, Batman, and Wonder Woman die fighting Steppenwolf while the Earth-1 Justice League forms to fight Darkseid and thwart his invasion of Earth.

A New 52 version of the Forever People debuted in the Infinity Man and the Forever People series. Serifan is now Serafina, Vykin's sister, and Beautiful Dreamer has been renamed Dreamer Beautiful.

== Fifth World ==
In December 2007, DC Executive Editor Dan DiDio was discussing the aftermath of Death of the New Gods and pointed to the creation of Fifth World; he said: "It's the advent of the Fifth World... I think we've telegraphed so much that the New Gods are coming upon a rebirth, and the story that we're telling with them now is a continuation of the story that was established when Kirby first conceived the concept. Talk about death—Kirby blew up worlds at the start of the series. The story started with, 'The Old Gods Died!' which made room for the New Gods—we're picking up that thread and launching the DCU into the future".

That series led into Final Crisis. DiDio clarified things further, saying that "the Fourth World is over. The battle between the forces of Darkseid and those of Highfather is over, and a new direction is in place for the characters in what will be deemed the Fifth World". The series' writer, Grant Morrison, added: "In Jack Kirby's Fourth World books... it's pretty clear that the New Gods have known about Earth for a long time and in JLA ten years ago, I suggested that part of their interest in us was rooted in the fact that Earth was destined to become the cradle of a new race of 'Fifth World' super-divinities—an eventuality Darkseid is eager to prevent from occurring". It was during that run on JLA that Morrison had Metron deliver a speech outlining the general principles:

How like little children you appear to me. How small is your comprehension and yet... there is a seed in you... The Old Gods died and gave birth to the New. These New Gods, even such as I, must also pass, in our turn. Our search was long and our war continues, but we found the planetary cradle of the Gods to Come. ... you are only forerunners.

Later, in the JLA storyline "World War III", Metron's dialog is more specific: "As New Genesis is to the Fourth World, Earth shall be to the Fifth that is to come".

== Collected editions ==
=== Trade paperbacks ===
The Kirby-produced "Fourth World" titles were reprinted by DC in trade paperback format in the early 2000s in black-and-white rather than in color, although the Superman's Pal Jimmy Olsen preludes were reprinted in color:

- Jack Kirby's New Gods, collects The New Gods #1–11; 304 pages, December 1997, ISBN 978-1563893858
- Mister Miracle:
  - Jack Kirby's Mister Miracle: Super Escape Artist collects Mr Miracle #1–10, 256 pages, September 1998, ISBN 978-1563894572
  - Jack Kirby's Fourth World: Featuring Mister Miracle collects Mister Miracle #11–18, 187 pages, July 2001, ISBN 978-1563897238
- Jack Kirby's The Forever People collects The Forever People #1–11, 288 pages, October 1999, ISBN 978-1563895104
- Jimmy Olsen: Adventures by Jack Kirby
  - Volume 1 collects Superman's Pal Jimmy Olsen #133–141, 183 pages, July 2003, ISBN 9781563899843
  - Volume 2 collects Superman's Pal Jimmy Olsen #142–150, 192 pages, October 2004, ISBN 9781401202590

=== Omnibus ===
DC reprinted the entire Fourth World saga in publishing order in the four volume hardback series Jack Kirby's Fourth World Omnibus from 2007 to 2008. In addition to the remaining issues of Mister Miracle, Forever People, and New Gods, the fourth Omnibus included the Fourth World character entries written for Who's Who: The Definitive Directory of the DC Universe, the 48-page "Even Gods Must Die!" from the last issue of the 1984 Baxter reprint series, and The Hunger Dogs graphic novel. The series was reprinted in paperback starting in late 2011. In 2017, in honor of Kirby's 100th birthday, DC Comics released a new hardcover omnibus collecting the story in its entirety. New contents included essays from Mark Evanier and Walter Simonson, and Kirby pencils, profiles, and pinups. The collection was released on December 12 the same year. The $150 omnibus however had a mistake, omitting the splash page from Jimmy Olsen #148, reprinting a page from an earlier episode instead.

In September 2021, a new edition, correcting the original error, with better quality paper stock at a reduced price was published with 50 additional pages of unpublished material. ISBN 978-1779512611

- Jack Kirby's Fourth World Omnibus
  - Volume 1 collects Forever People #1–3, Mister Miracle #1–3, The New Gods #1–3, Superman's Pal Jimmy Olsen #133–139, 396 pages, May 2007, ISBN 978-1401213442 (hardcover); December 2011, ISBN 978-1401232412 (paperback)
  - Volume 2 collects Forever People #4–6, Mister Miracle #4–6, The New Gods #4–6, Superman's Pal Jimmy Olsen #141–145, 396 pages, August 2007, ISBN 978-1401213572 (hardcover); April 2012, ISBN 978-1401234409 (paperback)
  - Volume 3 collects Forever People #7–10, Mister Miracle #7–9, The New Gods #7–10, Superman's Pal Jimmy Olsen #146–148, 396 pages, November 2007, ISBN 978-1401214852 (hardcover); August 2012, ISBN 978-1401235352 (paperback)
  - Volume 4 collects Forever People #11; Mister Miracle #10–18; The New Gods #11; "Even Gods Must Die" from The New Gods vol. 2, #6; DC Graphic Novel #4: "The Hunger Dogs", 424 pages, March 2008, ISBN 978-1401215835 (hardcover); December 2012, ISBN 978-1401237462 (paperback)
- Jack Kirbys Fourth World Omnibus HC, collects Superman's Pal Jimmy Olsen #133–139 and #141–148, The Forever People #1–11, The New Gods #1–11, Mister Miracle #1–18, New Gods vol. 2 #1–6, DC Graphic Novel #4: "The Hunger Dogs", and Who's Who: The Definitive Directory of the DC Universe #2–3, #6, #8–18, #20, #22 and #25, 1,536 pages, December 2017, ISBN 978-1401274757 (hardcover)

=== Absolute Editions ===
- Absolute Fourth World by Jack Kirby Vol. 1 – collects Superman's Pal Jimmy Olsen #133–139 and #141–145, The New Gods #1–6, The Forever People #1–6, Mister Miracle #1–6, June 2020, ISBN 978-1779500861
- Absolute Fourth World by Jack Kirby Vol. 2 – collects Superman's Pal Jimmy Olsen #146–148, The Forever People #7–11, The New Gods #7–11, Mister Miracle #7–18, Jack Kirby's New Gods (reprint series) #6, DC Graphic Novel #4: The Hunger Dogs and Kirby's On the Road to Armagetto. It also includes a new foreword by Tom Scioli, a gallery of pencil artwork by Kirby and essays by Kirby and Mark Evanier. Release date: January 2022, ISBN 978-1779513335

== Awards ==
Jack Kirby received a Shazam Award for the original metaseries in the category "Special Achievement by an Individual" in 1971.

In 1998, Jack Kirby's New Gods by Jack Kirby, edited by Bob Kahan, won both the Harvey Award for "Best Domestic Reprint Project" and the Eisner Award for "Best Archival Collection/Project".

== See also ==
- Jack Kirby bibliography
