= Black Racer (DC Comics) =

- The Black Racer as he first appeared on the cover of New Gods #3, art by Jack Kirby.

Publication information
- Publisher: DC Comics
- First appearance: New Gods #3 (July 1971)
- Created by: Jack Kirby

In-story information
- Alter ego: Sgt. William "Willie" Walker
- Team affiliations: New Gods
- Notable aliases: Flash
- Abilities: Immortality; Infinite super-speed; Super-charged brain-activity; Intangibility; Time travel by running faster than the speed of light; Enhanced super strength, endurance, reflexes, agility and stamina; Creation of vortexes; Electrokinesis; Dimensional travel; Time manipulation; Flight via cosmically powered skis; Death touch; Wears cosmic armor and skis; Energy projection and absorption; Matter manipulation; Invulnerability; Illusion casting; Cosmic perceptions and senses

The Black Racer is a character, a deity and avatar of Death in the DC Comics universe who often hunts those affiliated with the New Gods. The character first appears in New Gods #3 (July 1971) and was created by Jack Kirby.

== Fictional character biography ==
The Black Racer's corporeal form is Sgt. Willie Walker, who was paralyzed during the Vietnam War. Walker was contacted by the Source when Darkseid first brought the war of the gods to Earth, and told it was his responsibility to take on the role. The Racer makes use of what appear to be skis as his means of transport, much like how the Silver Surfer, another Kirby creation, uses a surfboard. New Gods are collected by the Racer at the moment of their deaths, and taken to Hadis (the Fourth World version of Hades).

In Captain Atom #42, it is stated that the Black Racer represents "death as inevitability", whereas Death of the Endless represents "death as compassionate release" and Nekron represents "Death as the ultimate opponent". This was contested by Neil Gaiman, who stated that Death of the Endless is the ultimate incarnation of death in the DC Universe.

During the Our Worlds at War storyline, the Black Racer attempts to harvest Steel's soul, but Superman talks him out of it. Young Justice encounters the Black Racer while he is moving Steel to Apokolips and pursues him by initiative of Lobo and Superboy, even if Robin disagreed.

=== Seven Soldiers ===
In Seven Soldiers: Mister Miracle, the Black Racer has a bet with Metron as to whether Mister Miracle will be successful in saving the New Gods following the destruction of Apokolips and New Genesis. The Racer's original form makes brief appearances to test Shilo Norman's skills. Willie Walker is later killed by Infinity-Man in Death of the New Gods mini-series.

=== Final Crisis ===
The Black Racer appears in the Final Crisis storyline, where he is present at the death of Orion and pursues Barry Allen and Wally West. As with the other New Gods, his appearance has been redesigned; he now wears a sleeker armor and wields scythe-like poles. The Final Crisis Sketchbook states that J. G. Jones and Grant Morrison designed the Black Racer to resemble a knight.

The Black Racer also appears at the end of #2, pursuing Barry Allen and the God-bullet that has been fired backwards through time. In issue #6, Wally West suggests that the Black Racer and the Black Flash are one and the same; in The Flash: Rebirth #2 this idea is mentioned once again. In issue #7, Barry and Wally West, chased by the Black Racer, bring him to a mortally wounded Darkseid, whom he decides to take in their place.

=== The New 52 ===
The Black Racer makes his first appearance after the Flashpoint reboot in the Darkseid War storyline, where he is merged with the Flash in a bid to kill Darkseid. The Racer's efforts were almost negated by the Flash's will to resist his corrupting ideals, instigating a conflict among the two. The Black Racer is separated from the Flash by the child of Superwoman and Lex Luthor, who is able to negate superpowers. The Black Racer, needing to kill somebody before it can disappear, attacks Jessica Cruz. This kills Volthoom, who had been possessing Cruz.

== Powers and abilities ==
The Black Racer has the power to phase through solid objects and bring death to those he has chosen with a single touch. He travels through the air by means of two cosmically powered celestial skis, which can accelerate to the speed of light. His ski poles can also phase through solid matter to deliver the Black Racer's death touch. As a deity, he is also immortal, and wears a cosmic armor that give him superhuman strength and endurance.

== Other versions ==
- An alternate universe version of the Black Racer appears in the JLA story arc "Rock of Ages".
- An alternate universe version of the Black Racer appears in Darkseid vs. Galactus: The Hunger.
- An alternate universe version of the Black Racer makes a non-speaking cameo appearance in Kingdom Come.
- An alternate universe version of the Black Racer appears in DCeased.

== In other media ==
=== Television ===
Black Racer makes a non-speaking appearance in the Superman: The Animated Series episode "Apokolips... Now!".

=== Video games ===
Black Racer appears as a character summon in Scribblenauts Unmasked: A DC Comics Adventure.

=== Miscellaneous ===
- The name "Black Racer" is used as an alternative alias for Smallville Season 11's incarnation of the Black Flash.
- Black Racer appears in the Injustice: Gods Among Us prequel comic as a prisoner of Darkseid.
