= Forager (character) =

DC comic character

- The original Forager as depicted in New Gods #9 (August 1972). Art by Jack Kirby.

Publication information
- Publisher: DC Comics
- First appearance: New Gods #9 (August 1972)
- Created by: Jack Kirby (writer & artist)

In-story information
- Species: Bug/New God
- Place of origin: New Genesis
- Abilities: Longevity; Immortality; Superhuman physical attributes; Bug-like attributes; Ability to cling to most surfaces; Shed exoskeleton; Shield, adhesive pads and acid-pods

Forager is a character appearing in American comic books published by DC Comics. Created by Jack Kirby, he first appeared in New Gods #9 (August 1972). Forager is depicted as an insectoid alien from New Genesis who is subjected to prejudice from the planet's other inhabitants, the New Gods. He was killed during the Cosmic Odyssey event in 1988, but resurrected years later in Bug! The Adventures of Forager, which was published as part of the "DC's Young Animal" imprint in 2017.

Forager has appeared in various media outside comics. He made a guest appearance in Justice League, voiced by Corey Burton, and appeared as a recurring character in Young Justice, voiced by Jason Spisak.

== Publication history ==
The original Forager first appeared in New Gods #9 (August 1972) and was created by Jack Kirby. A female version of the character debuted in New Gods (vol. 3) #2 (March 1989).

== Fictional character biography ==
=== Original Forager ===
Forager's people are a society of humanoid bugs that thrive in colonies beneath the surface of the planet and evolved from the "micro-life" spread on New Genesis during their war with Apokolips. Considered to be below the New Gods, the bugs form a lower class on New Genesis and are sometimes the target of prejudice. Although Forager was raised among the bugs, it is implied that he may actually be a New God.

Initially treated as subhuman by the New Gods, Forager proves himself to be a worthy ally against the forces of Darkseid. In the 1988 storyline Cosmic Odyssey, Forager is killed saving Batman's life and preventing the Anti-Life Equation from destroying Earth. Orion returns Forager's body to the bugs, having come to respect them.

Forager returns in the 2017 miniseries Bug! The Adventures of Forager, published as part of DC's Young Animal imprint. In the series, Forager awakens in a dream world following his death and encounters Sandman, who brings him to the real world by saying his nickname, "Bug".

=== Female Forager ===
Forager from Countdown #29, art by Ian Churchill.

A second, female Forager appears as the new defender of the bugs in a subsequent New Gods series in 1989. She is given the name of her people's fallen champion by the Prime One and Queen Widow, the leader of the bugs.

She appears again in Countdown to Final Crisis #40 spying on Darkseid to find out about Lightray's death, and she later recruits Jimmy Olsen to help her stop the murders of the New Gods. Jimmy and Forager later enter a romantic relationship. Over the course of the series, Forager and the other protagonists of Countdown are witness to the death of the New Gods, the Great Disaster, and the corruption of Mary Marvel. In its final issue, she ends her relationship with Jimmy and joins forces with Donna Troy, Atom, and Kyle Rayner to protect the multiverse.

== Powers and abilities ==
Forager possesses similar abilities to the New Gods, including superhuman strength, endurance, speed and reflexes. Forager's incredible strength allows him to face much bigger enemies, jumping several meters high easily and running to great speed without fatigue. Forager is extremely long-lived and immune to diseases. Also, he is an accomplished fighter, hardened by the bugs' harsh life of hunting and survival. In addition to his natural abilities, Forager carries a variety of tools including a shield, adhesive pads on his gloves and boots that allow him to stick or climb walls and surfaces, and acidic pods.

== In other media ==
=== Television ===
- The original Forager makes a cameo appearance in the Superman: The Animated Series episode "Apokolips...Now!".
- The original Forager appears in the Justice League episode "Twilight", voiced by Corey Burton. This version is modest and reveres the Supertown Gods. While aiding Batman and Wonder Woman in stopping Darkseid's attack on New Genesis, Forager uses his hive to provide shelter for Supertown's inhabitants after the New Gods abandon them. Following this, Highfather promotes Forager to a higher rank.
- Forager appears in Young Justice, voiced by Jason Spisak. This version possesses a more insect-like appearance with four arms, can roll up into a ball, and displays an odd connection to sentient technology. Additionally, he does not use pronouns due to his race's unique sense of self. Introduced in the third season, Young Justice: Outsiders, Forager contacts the Team to help stop a war between the Bugs and New Gods, only to be banished from his hive by Mantis and earn the wrath of Ma'alefa'ak, who orchestrated the conflict. As it is no longer safe for him on New Genesis, the Team takes Forager with them to Earth, where he joins them in fighting the Light and takes on the human identity Fred Bugg via a glamour charm to attend Happy Harbor High School. He later reveals his true identity to his classmates, to their enjoyment. As of the fourth season, Forager has become class valedictorian, graduated from Happy Harbor High, and enters a relationship with a female purple Forager (voiced by Nika Futterman), who later becomes a Green Lantern after Lor-Zod kills Tomar-Re.
- The original Forager makes a non-speaking cameo appearance in the Harley Quinn episode "Inner (Para) Demons".

=== Video games ===
Forager appears as a character summon in Scribblenauts Unmasked: A DC Comics Adventure.

== See also ==
- New Gods
