= Metron (character) =

- Metron as depicted in New Gods #5 (November 1971), art by Jack Kirby (pencils) and Mike Royer (inks).

Publication information
- Publisher: DC Comics
- First appearance: New Gods #1 (February–March 1971)
- Created by: Jack Kirby

In-story information
- Team affiliations: New God
- Abilities: Immortality; Superhuman physical attributes; Super intellect; Universal knowledge; Undefined god-like abilities; Utilizing Mobius Chair

Metron is a fictional antihero appearing in American comic books published by DC Comics. A member of the New Gods, he is an amoral and neutral collector of knowledge. He is commonly seen in the Mobius Chair, which can travel across time and space.

Metron has been adapted into various works featuring the New Gods. He is voiced by Daniel Dae Kim in Justice League Unlimited and Phil LaMarr in Young Justice.

== Publication history ==
Metron first appeared in New Gods #1 (February–March 1971) and was created by Jack Kirby for his Fourth World series. He was based on Leonard Nimoy's portrayal of the Star Trek character Spock and designed as a character who "would frequently change sides (between New Genesis and Apokolips)". The Metrons in Star Trek serve a similar capacity in the episode "Arena", seeking to settle a conflict in their star system by pitting Kirk against a Gorn captain.

== Fictional character biography ==
Although he possesses the powers of a god, Metron is typically depicted as a passive observer in the DC Universe rather than an active participant. He wanders in search of greater knowledge beyond his own, riding on his Mobius Chair, which can traverse time and space instantaneously. Metron is of neither New Genesis nor Apokolips, and usually avoids the struggle between the two worlds. Metron invented the "Boom Tube" technology used by the New Gods to teleport vast distances.

In 1989's Legends mini-series, Metron confides in Darkseid about the Anti-Life Equation. Apparently, Metron holds the key to the Anti-Life Equation. However, he is a seeker of knowledge, therefore he will tell no one of his knowledge. In the 1982 DC/Marvel crossover The Uncanny X-Men and The New Teen Titans, Metron tells Darkseid that Dark Phoenix is a part of the Anti-Life Equation. In the 2007 "Death of the New Gods" miniseries leading into Final Crisis, the Source explains the origin of the Anti-Life Equation to Metron.

Metron helps contact most of Earth's superheroes to gather them during the Zero Hour crisis. During Extant's return, he battles alongside the Justice Society of America after Extant gains control of the Worlogog.

In Kurt Busiek's JLA/Avengers miniseries, Metron observes the events in that story, and gives Iron Man a Mother Box to balance the power given to the Justice League by Grandmaster. He observes and investigates Krona's actions, refusing to deviate from his non-involvement at the end when Krona demands his aid. At the end, Metron watches over the newly formed cosmic egg.

In Mister Miracle, Metron contacts Mister Miracle during a stunt gone wrong, making him aware of the Fourth World. In his first appearance in the book, he looks like he has before, but later he disguises himself as an epileptic man in a wheelchair.

During the events of Death of the New Gods, when multiple New Gods are murdered, Metron learns that the murderer is the Source, who has been trying to reacquire its original powers and reunite with its other half: the Anti-Life Entity. Rather than stop the Source, Metron stands by the Source's side to watch as the Fourth World ends. After the death of Mister Miracle at the hands of the Source, Metron grows disgusted and demands to be killed, with the Source complies with. Superman later uses Metron's Mobius Chair to gain the precious Element X needed to power up the Miracle Machine, which allows him to restore the multiverse and undo the damage caused by Darkseid. It is revealed that Metron and every other denizen of Apokolips and New Genesis, except for Darkseid, is fated to be reborn.

=== The New 52 ===
In 2011, The New 52 rebooted the DC universe. Metron consults with Highfather about the various uses of the Lantern rings. About twenty members of the interstellar police force, the Green Lantern Corps confront Highfather and his military forces. They are trying to recover the power ring belonging to the sentient planet Mogo, who needs it to remain sentient and viable. Highfather leaves the matter to his subordinates, who slaughter most of the Lanterns.

Metron confronts the Anti-Monitor on Earth-Three an attempt to divert a war between the Anti-Monitor and Darkseid. A conversation between Metron and the Anti-Monitor suggests that he once sat on the Mobius Chair himself prior to Metron. Metron is struck from behind by Darkseid's daughter Grail, who leaves him for dead.

Metron returns to confront the Justice League and warn them that they should evacuate Earth, as it is impossible to win against the Anti-Monitor and Darkseid. Diana uses the Lasso of Truth to make Metron admit that they can find the answers if they take the chair from him, prompting Diana to pull him off the chair and Batman to sit in it, giving him access to all of Metron's accumulated knowledge.

After the Anti-Monitor and Darkseid are destroyed in battle, Metron appears on the moon and trains Owlman, who now controls the Mobius Chair. As Owlman demands to know the secrets of the universe, he and Metron are vaporized by a mysterious entity.

During the "Dark Nights: Death Metal" storyline, an omniversal being called the Chronicler watches the battle between Perpetua and the Darkest Knight. The Chronicler resurrects Metron, who notes that they have similar motives in life, like wanting to observe and save the multiverse. Metron allows the Chronicler to look into his mind.

== Powers and abilities ==
As a New God, Metron possesses superhuman physical abilities and is nigh-immortal. He is a skilled inventor and wields the Mobius Chair, which enables him to travel through time and space.

== Other versions ==
- An alternate universe version of Metron who serves Darkseid appears in JLA: Rock of Ages.
- Muttron, an alternate universe funny animal version of Metron, appears in Captain Carrot and the Final Ark.
- An alternate universe version of Metron appears in Seven Soldiers. This version was cast out of New Genesis after Darkseid's takeover and transformed into a human.
- An alternate universe version of Metron appears in Superman: The Dark Side.

== In other media ==
=== Television ===
- Metron makes a non-speaking cameo appearance in the Superman: The Animated Series episode "Apokolips... Now!".
- Metron appears in Justice League Unlimited, voiced by Daniel Dae Kim.
- Metron appears in Young Justice, voiced by Phil LaMarr. This version possesses additional telekinetic abilities and maintains the Infinity Vault in the Mobius Dimension.

=== Film ===
In Justice League: Gods and Monsters, the crippled and apparently paralyzed Lex Luthor (voiced by Jason Isaacs) turns into a version of Metron via Boom Tube technology provided by Wonder Woman.

=== Video games ===
Metron appears as a character summon in Scribblenauts Unmasked: A DC Comics Adventure.

=== Merchandise ===
Metron received an exclusive action figure through Mattel's online DC Universe Signature Series line.
