= Steppenwolf (character) =

DC Comics character

- Steppenwolf as depicted in Earth 2 #1 (July 2012). Art by Nicola Scott and Trevor Scott

Publication information
- Publisher: DC Comics
- First appearance: New Gods #7 (February 1972)
- Created by: Jack Kirby

In-story information
- Species: New God
- Place of origin: Apokolips
- Team affiliations: Darkseid's Elite
- Notable aliases: General of Apokolips
- Abilities: Superhuman strength, speed, stamina, durability, reflexes, and agility; Immortality; Weapon proficiency; Master warrior and military leader; Wields nigh-indestructible Electro-Axe; Armor with the capability of reshaping itself

Steppenwolf (German for "Steppe wolf") is a supervillain appearing in comic books published by DC Comics. Created by writer-artist Jack Kirby, the character first appeared in New Gods #7 (February 1972). A New God and military general from the planet Apokolips, Steppenwolf is Darkseid's uncle and subordinate who commands his army of Parademons.

The character is featured in the DC Extended Universe, portrayed by Ciarán Hinds via motion capture.

== Fictional character biography ==
Steppenwolf is a New God who is the younger brother of Heggra (Darkseid's mother) and the uncle of Uxas (Darkseid). He is also a member of Darkseid's Elite. He leads the military forces of Apokolips and rides hounds bred for battle.

Steppenwolf is one of the earliest survivors of Doomsday, the monster who once killed Superman. 245,000 years ago, Steppenwolf takes an Apokoliptian shuttle with Darkseid, Master Mayhem, and a small crew to the planet of Bylan 5. The planet holds delicate natural materials Apokolips needs for weaponry, material which would be destroyed in the event of an invasion. The forcible marriage of Darkseid to the planet's princess comes to an end when Doomsday attacks. Master Mayhem is swiftly torn apart. Darkseid ignores Steppenwolf's orders to use omega beams and engages the creature in hand-to-hand combat. Steppenwolf sees that the destruction that has been wrought has doomed the planet, and all who live on it. He teleports Darkseid out of harm's way, agreeing with Darkseid not to mention this to anyone. Doomsday escapes by stowing away on the Apokoliptian shuttle.

Most of Steppenwolf's appearances under the pen of Jack Kirby are in flashbacks. His debut, in New Gods #7, is a flashback story in which he helps Darkseid murder Highfather's wife. Highfather tracks down and kills Steppenwolf in retaliation, reigniting the war between the two sides. However, Steppenwolf is eventually resurrected using Apokoliptian technology.

Steppenwolf appears when Mister Miracle (Scott Free) gains godlike powers over life and death. Steppenwolf torments him over his role in killing Scott's mother (or alleged mother figure as is claimed) and in return is physically tortured. Free ends up healing him, instead of killing him as he desires. He is sent away with Darkseid's legions.

He is seen in New Gods (vol. 2) #6, with a new costume (a Kirby redesign for the figure's Super Powers action figure). Though considered a "mockery", Steppenwolf is given the job of running Darkseid's military forces. He is later seen fighting the Flash (Barry Allen) and the Justice League of America.

In Terror Titans #2, Steppenwolf appears as a member of the Dark Side Club before being killed by the Clock King. He is later resurrected following The New 52 continuity reboot.

== Powers and abilities ==
As a New God, Steppenwolf is nigh-immortal and possesses superhuman strength and durability. Furthermore, he is an experienced military leader and wields various weapons, including an electric axe and a cable-snare that can generate radion beams.

== Other versions ==
- An alternate universe variant of Steppenwolf from Earth-Two appears in the Earth-2 comic series. He invades Earth and kills its versions of Superman, Batman, and Wonder Woman before being killed by Bizarro.
- Steppenwolf appears in DC x Sonic the Hedgehog

== In other media ==
=== Television ===
Steppenwolf as depicted in Superman: The Animated Series

- Steppenwolf appears in the Superman: The Animated Series two-part episode "Apokolips... Now!", voiced by Sherman Howard.
- Steppenwolf appears in the Justice League (2001) two-part episode "Twilight", voiced by Corey Burton.
- Steppenwolf appears in Batman: The Brave and the Bold, voiced by Kevin Michael Richardson. This version is a champion gladiator in Mongul's Warworld.
- Steppenwolf appears in the Justice League Action episode "Under a Red Sun", voiced by Peter Jessop.
- Steppenwolf appears in Harley Quinn, voiced by Keith Ferguson. This version is an openly gay, intergalactic businessman whose design is a composite of his original and modern comics designs and that of his Zack Snyder's Justice League incarnation (see below).

=== Film ===
An alternate universe variant of Steppenwolf makes a non-speaking cameo appearance in Justice League: Gods and Monsters.

==== DC Extended Universe ====
Steppenwolf as depicted in the theatrically-released Justice League (top) and in Zack Snyder's Justice League (bottom).

Steppenwolf appears in films set in the DC Extended Universe (DCEU).

- Steppenwolf makes a holographic cameo appearance in the Ultimate Edition of Batman v Superman: Dawn of Justice (2016) via CGI.
- Steppenwolf appears in the theatrical cut of Justice League (2017) and the director's cut, Zack Snyder's Justice League, voiced and motion captured by Ciarán Hinds. For his performance, Hinds consulted Liam Neeson, who had done similar motion capture work in A Monster Calls.
  - In the theatrical release, Steppenwolf is exiled from Apokolips for failing to conquer Earth a millennium prior, after which his Mother Boxes were stolen and hidden around the world. In the present, Steppenwolf returns to Earth in hopes of renewing his invasion and regaining Darkseid's favor. Despite reclaiming the Mother Boxes, he encounters the Justice League and is defeated and returned to Apokolips. This depiction of Steppenwolf was negatively received, with criticism directed at the character's poor computer-generated design and generic demeanor. It was later reported that Steppenwolf's appearance and personality were drastically altered during Joss Whedon's retooling of the film, which Screen Rant criticized for being "too family-friendly" and "forgettable". Additionally, Hinds has expressed frustration with the theatrical version for trimming much of Steppenwolf's development and personality.
  - In the director's cut, Steppenwolf is banished from Apokolips for attempting to betray Darkseid and must conquer 150,000 worlds before he can return. Additionally, the Mother Boxes were left on Earth following Darkseid's failed invasion of Earth eons ago. After the Mother Boxes are reactivated following Superman's death, Steppenwolf travels to Earth to retrieve them, discovering the Anti-Life Equation in the process. Darkseid gives Steppenwolf a chance at redemption by uniting the Mother Boxes to prepare for his arrival. Steppenwolf and his Parademon forces overwhelm the Justice League until a resurrected Superman arrives and defeats him. Nonetheless, the Mother Boxes are synchronized, allowing Steppenwolf to xenoform Earth. However, the Flash taps into the Speed Force and reverses time to undo his victory, leading to Aquaman, Superman, and Wonder Woman killing Steppenwolf and returning his corpse to Apokolips. This depiction of Steppenwolf received a more positive reception from fans and critics, with praise directed at his monstrous and alien design, more menacing and sinister presence, and greater level of character depth and development in contrast to his theatrical counterpart.

=== Video games ===
Steppenwolf appears as a playable character in Lego DC Super-Villains, voiced again by Peter Jessop.
