= Mother Box =

Fictional device used in Jack Kirby comics

Publication information
- Publisher: DC Comics
- First appearance: The Forever People #1 (March 1971)
- Created by: Jack Kirby

In story information
- Type: Computer, Technology
- Element of stories featuring: New Gods

Mother Boxes are fictional devices in Jack Kirby's Fourth World setting in the DC Universe.

The Mother Boxes appeared in the feature films Justice League and Zack Snyder's Justice League of the DC Extended Universe.

== History ==
Superman uses a Mother Box to get to Apokolips in Superman/Doomsday Hunter/Prey #1.

Created by Apokoliptian scientist Himon using the mysterious Element X, Mother Boxes are generally thought to be sentient, miniaturized, portable supercomputers, though their true nature and origins are unknown. They possess a variety of abilities not understood even by their users, the gods of New Genesis. These range from teleportation to energy manipulation, and Mother Boxes have even been seen healing the injured, including Darkseid himself, after he was beaten by Doomsday. The Boxes provide their owner with unconditional love and self-destruct when their owner dies.

Mother Boxes are most often in the shape of a small box, but they can also be much larger (as is the one carried by the Forever People), and do not always need to be in the shape of a box at all. For instance, Mister Miracle had Mother Box circuitry woven into the hood of his costume. They usually communicate with a repetitive "ping!" which can be understood by their users.

Mother Boxes can only be manufactured by a being born either on New Genesis or Apokolips, and not all of them can do it (at least one on Apokolips failed). This is accomplished through much training. It is implied in the books that the maker's character influences the successful construction of a Mother Box.

== Father Box ==
The Father Box is an Apokoliptian version of a Mother Box, which first appeared in the Orion series by Walt Simonson in 2000. Darkseid's former aide Mortalla presents Orion with an Apokoliptian Father Box. In Grant Morrison's Seven Soldiers: Mister Miracle storyline, a Father Box is mentioned as one of the "Seven Treasures" the New Gods left to Aurakles. Eventually, it was stolen by Klarion the Witch Boy, who took it to the future. Doctor Impossible and Teen Titans member Power Boy have also been shown to use Father Boxes.

== Interpretation ==
In a 2008 article, John Hodgman observed: "Mister Miracle, a warrior of Apokolips who flees to Earth to become a 'super escape artist', keeps a 'Mother Box' up his sleeve — a small, living computer that can enable its user to do almost anything, so long as it is sufficiently loved. In Kirby's world, all machines are totems: weapons and strange vehicles fuse technology and magic, and the Mother Box in particular uncannily anticipates the gadget fetishism that infects our lives today. The Bluetooth headset may well be a Kirby creation". Similarly, Mike Cecchini of Den of Geek described the Mother Box as "an alien smartphone that can do anything from heal the injured to teleport you across time and space", and Christian Holub in Entertainment Weekly called it "basically a smartphone, as designed by gods". Mother Boxes have also been interpreted as a symbol of the "ideal mother" and an example of the role of motherhood in Kirby's Fourth World stories.

== In other media ==
=== Television ===
- Mother Boxes appear in the DC Animated Universe series Superman: The Animated Series, Batman Beyond, Justice League (2001), and Justice League Unlimited.
- Mother Boxes and Father Boxes appear in Young Justice. Halo is depicted as the spirit of a dismantled Mother Box inhabiting the body of Gabrielle Daou, a refugee who was killed by metahuman traffickers. Additionally, Victor Stone is depicted as having been transformed into a cyborg via a Father Box to save his life. However, the Father Box's influence threatens to overwhelm Victor until he is taken to Metron's Mobius Chair to purge him.
- Mother Boxes appear in Justice League Action.
- A Mother Box appears in DC Super Hero Girls: Super Hero High.
- A Mother Box appears in the Harley Quinn episode "Inner (Para) Demons".

=== Film ===
==== DC Extended Universe ====
- In Batman v Superman: Dawn of Justice, a Mother Box appears briefly in footage that Batman obtained from Lex Luthor. The Box is the final component that transforms Victor Stone into Cyborg, saving his life. Additionally, Steppenwolf and his Mother Boxes appear in a post-credits scene in the Ultimate Edition of the film.
- In Justice League (2017), Steppenwolf is in search of three Mother Boxes hidden away on Earth. Two are located in Themyscira and Atlantis, while the third is the one that had been seen in Batman v Superman. Previously, Steppenwolf had used the Boxes in his original invasion of Earth, intending to use them to xenoform the planet before being driven off. After the war, the boxes were left on Earth, and the Amazons, Atlanteans, and humans each took custody of one of them. When all three boxes awaken after years of dormancy, Steppenwolf returns seeking to use them to finish what he had started. Eventually, after the Justice League defeat Steppenwolf, the first two boxes are each returned to their respective custodies, while Silas Stone begins researching the third box with his son.
- Zack Snyder's Justice League depicts the Mother Boxes generally the same as in the theatrical version. After a failed invasion of Earth by Darkseid thousands of years ago, the Mother Boxes are separated and hidden away as in the theatrical release. The Amazonian Mother Box "awakens" upon Superman's death at the end of Batman v Superman, and alerts Steppenwolf to its location. He escapes with it after a short battle with the Amazonians and proceeds to search for the other two by capturing and interrogating Atlanteans and S.T.A.R. Labs scientists. Steppenwolf seizes the Atlantean Mother Box after a fight with Aquaman and Mera. The protagonists resurrect Superman with the third Mother Box, and Steppenwolf is able to claim it after an amnesiac Superman attacks the other superheroes. The superheroes locate Steppenwolf's fortress in Russia thanks to Silas Stone's self-sacrifice which allows them to detect the third Mother Box's location. They launch an attack on the fortress so Cyborg can interface with the Boxes and prevent the Unity. After they fail and Earth is destroyed, the Flash travels back in time to enable Cyborg to successfully deactivate the Boxes, preventing the Unity and defeating Steppenwolf, who is subsequently killed through the combined efforts of Aquaman, Superman, and Wonder Woman. In the aftermath, DeSaad informs Darkseid that the Mother Boxes are now destroyed, forcing Darkseid to conquer Earth through military conquest.
- In the Blu-ray release of Wonder Woman, the epilogue Etta's Mission is included as an additional detailing of the events that transpired after the events of the film's story. Etta Candy's titular mission involves her, Diana Prince, and Steve Trevor retrieving one of the three Mother Boxes.

==== Animation ====
- Two Mother Boxes appear in Superman/Batman: Apocalypse.
- Several Mother Boxes appear in Justice League: War.
- A Mother Box appears in Reign of the Supermen, where it is used by Lex Luthor.

=== Video games ===
- A Mother Box appears in Justice League Heroes. It is coveted by Brainiac and used as a way to transform Earth into a "New Apokolips" by Darkseid.
- In Injustice 2, Mother Boxes serve as the game's loot box rewards system, offering differing rewards depending on the rarity. Additionally, Cyborg utilizes Mother Boxes in gameplay to create drones that can target the opponent from multiple directions.
- In Lego DC Super-Villains, a Mother Box is stolen from Wayne Tech and owned by Harley Quinn, who names it "Boxy". It is also revealed that the Mother Box contains the last piece of the Anti-Life Equation, which is then absorbed by the Rookie.
