= New Gods =

Fictional species appearing in the New Gods comic book series

- Artwork of the New Gods, Magnificent Seven. Art by Alex Ross.

Species publication information
- Publisher: DC Comics
- First appearance: The New Gods #1 (February 1971)
- Created by: Jack Kirby (writer and artist)

Characteristics
- Place of origin: New Genesis, Apokolips

The New Gods or New Gods

Series publication information
- Publisher: DC Comics
- Schedule: Vol. 1 Bimonthly; Vol. 2–5; Monthly
- Format: Vol. 1, 3, 4, 5 Ongoing series Vol. 2 and Death of the New Gods; Limited series
- Genre: Superhero
- Publication date: (Vol. 1); February 1971 – October/November 1972 (Vol. 1 continued); July 1977 – July/August 1978 (Vol. 2); June 1979 – November 1984 (Vol. 3); February 1989 – August 1991 (Vol. 4); October 1995 – February 1997 (Death of the New Gods); Early December 2007 – June 2008 (Vol. 5); December 2024
- Number of issues: Vol. 1; 19; Vol. 2; 6 Vol. 3; 28; Vol. 4; 15; Death of the New Gods; 8 Vol. 5; 3

Creative team
- Writer(s): List: Vol. 1 Jack Kirby, Gerry Conway Vol. 3 Mark Evanier Vol. 4 Tom Peyer, Rachel Pollack, John Byrne Death of the New Gods Jim Starlin Vol. 5 Ram V
- Penciller(s): List: Vol. 1 Jack Kirby, Don Newton, Rich Buckler Vol. 3 Paris Cullins, Steve Erwin, Rick Hoberg Vol. 4 Luke Ross, John Byrne Death of the New Gods Jim Starlin Vol. 5 Evan Cagle
- Inker(s): List: Vol. 1 Vince Colletta, Mike Royer, Dan Adkins Vol. 3 Bob Lewis, Willie Blyberg Vol. 4 Brian Garvey, Bob Wiacek Death of the New Gods Matt Banning, Art Thibert

Collected editions
- Jack Kirby's New Gods: ISBN 1-56389-385-1

The New Gods are a fictional extraterrestrial species appearing in the eponymous comic book series published by DC Comics, as well as in other DC titles. Created and designed by Jack Kirby, they first appeared in February 1971 in New Gods #1.

== Publication history ==
=== Volume 1 (1971) ===
The New Gods are natives of the twin planets of New Genesis and Apokolips. New Genesis is an idyllic planet filled with unspoiled forests, mountains, and rivers and ruled by the benevolent Highfather, while Apokolips is a nightmarish, polluted dystopia filled with machinery and fire pits, ruled by the tyrannical Darkseid. The two planets were once part of the same world, a planet called Urgrund (German for "primeval ground"), but it was split apart millennia ago after the death of the Old Gods during Ragnarök. The characters associated with the New Gods are often collectively referred to as "Jack Kirby's Fourth World". Unhappy with Marvel Comics at the time, as he had created or co-created a plethora of characters without having copyright or creative custody of them, he turned to rival publisher DC Comics, with his sketches and designs for a new group of heroes and villains. According to Marc Flores, who writes under the pen name Ronin Ro:

The idea of the New Gods had come to Jack years earlier, when he was plotting 90 percent of the "Tales of Asgard" stories in Thor. He wanted to have two planets at war and end with Ragnarok, the battle that would kill Thor's lucrative pantheon. Instead, he tried the idea in his Inhumans stories. Now he was presenting it in its original context. Though he wouldn't ever say it publicly, the New Gods books started right after the gods in Thor killed one another. The first page of Orion of the New Gods showed the same scenes from Thor—a planet torn in half and armored gods holding swords and dying on a fiery battleground.

Kirby began the "Fourth World" in Superman's Pal Jimmy Olsen #133 (October 1970). The New Gods first appeared in New Gods #1 (February-March 1971) and Forever People #1 (February-March 1971). Another "Fourth World" title Mister Miracle was launched the following month (March-April 1971). Various New Gods, notably Darkseid, went on to interact with other denizens of the DC Universe.

New Gods #1 marks the first appearance of Orion, Highfather, and Metron, among others. The opening sequence alludes to the presence of the "Old Gods" and the "New Gods" (e.g., "There came a time when the Old Gods died..."). Simultaneously published during this time were the Forever People and Mister Miracle series, also written and drawn by Kirby.

Some Kirby fans consider the three-issue arc in New Gods #6–8 to be the peak of Kirby's artistic work. Jason Sacks and Keith Dallas say that issue #6, "The Glory Boat", "juxtaposes several of [Kirby's] favorite themes: the conflict between generations, the ways that pacifism is forced to confront violence, and, of course, the continuing battle between Apokolips and New Genesis, all drawn in some of the most spectacular art of his career." Charles Hatfield says that the story's conclusion:

"...is a pure example of Kirby's technological sublime, at once redemptive and seductive, healing and cataclysmic... This rhapsodic episode suggests a glorying in, but also a fearful ambivalence about, the blurring of the living and the technological."

Issue #7, "The Pact", sought to explain the backstory of the New Gods. Sacks and Keith said:

"While the story can also be read as a commentary and critique of the Vietnam War (as it's all about the ambiguity and moral costs of war), 'The Pact' is a creation myth in comics form, providing readers deeper context about both the struggle between Apokolips and New Genesis and the great sacrifices that have to be made to create peace in the face of overwhelming destruction."

Despite the creative strength of Kirby's material, the book's sales slipped steadily after a strong start. New Gods was cancelled with issue #11 (Oct–Nov 1972), and the last issue of Forever People was also #11 (August–September 1972). The Apokolips/New Genesis war was left unresolved.

Kirby's production assistant at the time, Mark Evanier, explained:

"Folks forget but the New Gods saga was intended to be a limited series ... There was no intention that these characters would go on forever. After Jack's books started getting good sales figures, DC demanded that we keep them going and use guest stars like Deadman, which we were very much against doing. So Kirby had this novel he was forever stuck in the middle of – he could never get to the last chapter. ... You can spot the issues where Jack kind of gave up trying to advance the story of Darkseid and Orion and was marking time. If those books had been intended from the start to run indefinitely, they would have been done very differently."

Despite the sales failure of the book, Kirby's work has remained an inspiration for future comics creators. Comics historian Les Daniels observed in 1995:

"Kirby's mix of slang and myth, science fiction and the Bible, made for a heady brew, but the scope of his vision has endured."

In 2007, comics writer Grant Morrison commented:

"Kirby's dramas were staged across Jungian vistas of raw symbol and storm ... The Fourth World saga crackles with the voltage of Jack Kirby's boundless imagination let loose onto paper."

==== Return of the New Gods (1977) ====
In 1976, the New Gods were featured in the last issue of 1st Issue Special, written by Gerry Conway and Dennis O'Neil and pencilled by Mike Vosburg. The issue featured a new, more mainstream superhero costume for Orion, which he would wear for the next few years, but failed to lead to a relaunch. That same year, Jenette Kahn became DC's new publisher and decided to revive the "Fourth World" lineup in 1977. The New Gods series relaunched in July 1977, and with 1st Issue Special still a relatively recent publication, it picked up where the storyline of that issue left off. Although the title remained "The New Gods" in the indicia and retained its original numbering, launching with #12, the covers used the title "The Return of the New Gods". Conway wrote the series and Don Newton provided the pencils.

The series introduced the character Jezebelle. It was cancelled with issue #19 (July–August 1978) prior to the "DC Implosion", where a variety of market-related factors caused DC to cancel almost all of the titles launched the previous year. The final chapters of the series were published as backup features in the Adventure Comics #459–460 (1978) featured a climactic battle between Darkseid's forces and the New Gods, culminating in Darkseid's defeat and apparent "death." Conway later said that he felt the finale he provided for the New Gods saga was inadequate, though he greatly enjoyed working with Newton on the series.

The New Gods met the Flash in Super-Team Family #15 (March–April 1978).

Darkseid's "death" would quickly be overturned in the New Gods' next appearance in Justice League of America #183–185. The three-part storyline would tell of Darkseid's return to Apokolips and his scheme to destroy Earth-Two and teleport Apokolips into its place, so that he could conquer a new universe devoid of the New Gods. The plan would be foiled by the combined power of the New Gods, the Justice League, and the Justice Society.

=== Volume 2 (1984) ===
Essentially a reprint series, this volume packaged two issues apiece per single issue of the original 1971 series. The mini-series' final issue was originally intended to include a reprint of New Gods #11 and a new 24-page story which would conclude the series and end with both Darkseid and Orion dead. DC editors prevented Kirby from using his original intended ending. Kirby instead turned in a one-off story called "On the Road to Armagetto" which was also rejected, due to the fact that it did not contain a definitive ending to the series. A 48-page new story called "Even Gods Must Die" was published in the sixth issue of the reprint series instead, which in turn served as a prologue for the upcoming The Hunger Dogs graphic novel, which DC editors greenlighted to conclude the series.

==== The Hunger Dogs ====
Published as DC Graphic Novel #4, The Hunger Dogs was intended by Kirby and DC to serve as the end to the entire Fourth World saga. The project was mired in controversy over Kirby's insistence that the series should end with the deaths of the New Gods, which clashed with DC's demands that the New Gods could not be killed off.

As a result, production of the graphic novel suffered many delays and revisions. Pages and storyline elements from the never published "On the Road to Armagetto" were revised and incorporated into the graphic novel, while DC ordered the entire plot restructured, resulting in many pages of the story being rearranged out of Kirby's intended reading order.

In the end, The Hunger Dogs saw the tormented, slave population of Apokolips rise up against Darkseid in a massive slave revolt, forcing Darkseid to flee. Darkseid returned and reclaimed Apokolips prior to the events of the 1986 Legends crossover.

=== Volume 3 (1989–91) ===
Following the Cosmic Odyssey limited series by Jim Starlin and Mike Mignola, a new New Gods series was launched. Written by longtime Kirby assistant Mark Evanier, with co-author and penciler Paris Cullins, this would be the most lengthy New Gods run yet. Coming in at 28 issues, this volume was published from February 1989 to August 1991. This series is sometimes considered volume 2, as the aforementioned volume 2 was essentially a reprinting of volume 1.

=== Volume 4 (1995–97) ===
Originally written by Tom Peyer and Rachel Pollack, and pencilled by Luke Ross, volume 4 of New Gods ran from October 1995 until February 1997. It was taken over by John Byrne for issues #12–15 at the end of the series; this title would be renamed Jack Kirby's Fourth World, also by Byrne, with numbering reset to issue #1, and covers provided by Walt Simonson. Walt Simonson's Orion series, which continued to host the backup feature "Tales of the New Gods", began in Byrne's Jack Kirby's Fourth World and served as an extension of it. Simonson wished to simply title his series "New Gods", but DC felt the name had been used too much recently.

John Byrne's one-shot issue Darkseid vs. Galactus: The Hunger also appeared in October 1995.

=== 2007–2024 ===
==== Death of the New Gods and Final Crisis ====
Taking place in both the yearlong series Countdown to Final Crisis (2007–2008) and its spin-off, Death of the New Gods, written by Jim Starlin, was a story-arc involving the mysterious deaths of the New Gods across the universe in preparation for the coming storylines in Grant Morrison's Final Crisis, published later in 2008. As elaborated in Death of the New Gods, the mysterious Godkiller turned out to be an agent of the sentient Source itself, which sought to destroy the imperfect Fourth World—compromised by the disruption in its creation by the Old Gods—in favor of a more perfect "Fifth World" by reuniting the Source with the Anti-Life Equation. The Source's initial attempts to recreate the Fifth World had been hampered by the Crisis on Infinite Earths which unified the multiverse and forged an impenetrable Source Wall around the Anti-Life Equation. The Source's agent is revealed to be the New God Infinity-Man. Darkseid acquires the powers of the Anti-Life Equation and capitalizes on the deaths of the New Gods by using the human Jimmy Olsen as a "soul-catcher" for the Gods, from which he can claim all their powers and recreate the universe in his own image, but he is killed when the Source is able to send Darkseid's resurrected son, Orion, to rip out his heart. Orion leaves the scene of the fray to die of his own wounds; and, seemingly with success, the Source entity reunites with the Anti-Life entity and merge Apokolips with New Genesis to create the Fifth World, with the New Gods of the Fourth World all deceased.

In DC Universe #0, a bridge between the Countdown and Final Crisis limited series, Darkseid is resurrected on Earth. In Final Crisis, Darkseid and his minions now exist on Earth in the guises of organized criminals, with Darkseid taking the name "Boss Dark Side". Other New Gods, such as Metron and the Black Racer, also appear reborn in newer, more elaborate Fifth World incarnations. Orion is discovered dead by detective Dan Turpin, prompting the Guardians of the Universe to launch an investigation. Batman surmises that Orion was in fact killed not of injuries from battling Darkseid, but by a sort of bullet sent backwards in time. Darkseid spreads the Anti-Life Equation among the human population, creating monstrous slaves out of its victims as he ushers in the Final Crisis of Mankind. Shilo Norman begins recruiting an army, warning of a war in heaven having occurred where evil won. Darkseid similarly claims to have ultimately come out of this war in heaven the victor. The villain Libra reappears on Earth after a long absence, making promises to the villains of Earth in the name of the deity he worships.

Grant Morrison addressed what they described as "the disconnects that online commentators, sadly, seem to find more fascinating than the stories themselves", by explaining that they provided a rough draft of the first issue, and an outline of the plot, before the writing began on Countdown and Death of the New Gods. They outlined their thinking on the issues of continuity between the stories by stating that they "started writing Final Crisis #1 in early 2006, around the same time as the 52 series was starting to come out, so Final Crisis was more a continuation of plot threads from Seven Soldiers and 52 than anything else."

As the events of Final Crisis unfold, it is revealed that the evil gods of Apokolips have been hiding in human bodies, and some have their bodies "rebuilt" for them in the Evil Factory, formerly the Command-D bunkers in Blüdhaven. Darkseid inhabits the body of Dan Turpin, after Turpin finally succumbs to the evil god. Kalibak inhabits a new body, that of a humanoid tiger, leading a team of similar creatures in battle. Mokkari and Simyan appear, looking more or less identical to their previous forms, with no explanation given to where their bodies came from. Granny Goodness takes up residence in the Alpha Lantern Kraken, using her to attack the Guardians of the Universe, while DeSaad inhabits the body of Mary Marvel. The Female Furies themselves are not shown to still exist, but they are recreated using Anti-Life controlled heroes and villains in the forms of Wonder Woman, Batwoman, Catwoman, and Giganta.

At the conclusion of the series, the essence of Darkseid is destroyed; the New Gods, are resurrected and reborn; and Nix Uotan implies that they will guide the recently destroyed Earth-51, restoring it to prosperity and peace. Nix also indicates that the Super Young Team are the new Forever People of the Fifth World.

==== Post-Final Crisis ====
In an interview with Newsarama, DC executive editor Dan DiDio spoke of the future of the New Gods in the DC Universe, saying, "The other thing we'll give a rest to as well is the concept of the New Gods and the ideas surrounding them. There's a very clear conclusion to the New Gods’ storyline in Final Crisis #7. The good part about it is that readers will see that ending, and we won't have to return to it right away. Like the Multiverse, the New Gods will be out there and available to us, and we can use them when we see fit, and feel the time is right. Just because we introduced concepts doesn't mean that we have to constantly use them."

==== The New 52 ====
In September 2011, The New 52 rebooted DC's continuity. In this new timeline, Darkseid first appears in Justice League #4. DeSaad and Steppenwolf also briefly appear in this story arc, experimenting on Superman and referring to "the search for Darkseid's daughter", explaining Darkseid's actions throughout infinite and his assault and assimilation of various worlds throughout the multiverse. In subsequent issues it is revealed that Cyborg's teleportation powers are linked to the Boom Tubes, thanks to upgrades performed by his father utilizing the Mother Box found by the team in their initial adventure. Every 1,000 times he uses this technology, a glitch in it transports him and his Justice League comrades to Apokolips.

In the pages of Earth 2 #1, it is revealed that Darkseid's search has also resulted in his traversing the array of worlds invading this parallel Earth. Unlike his encounters in Justice League, this one is far more successful, resulting in the death of that Earth's Superman, Batman and Wonder Woman; in the midst of this war, Power Girl and Huntress somehow traverse into the realm of Prime-Earth.

It is teased that the fall of the Olympian Gods will lead to the creation of New Gods, but not stated if they mean the species of New Gods populating the Fourth World or simply newer younger gods. A figure, with Orion's helmet, appears in shadow then disappears into a Boom Tube. Orion fights against, then assists Wonder Woman in her struggle with the gods of Olympus and the monstrous First Born of Zeus, eventually leading her and the Last Born of Olympus to New Genesis and its leader: Highfather. While Highfather appears much younger than his pre-Flashpoint incarnation, New Genesis appears much the same, consisting of a futuristic floating city above a mostly rural world covered in forests.

In the Darkseid special issue, it is revealed that he and Highfather are some of the only survivors of a previous larger world, where they were brothers and peasants. Their world was also inhabited by colossal beings known as Old Gods, who spent much of their time brawling with each other, feeding off the worship of the 'mudgrubbers', whose lives were often lost in the battles. One day the man formerly known as Uxas, having tired of his idol's destructiveness, decided to spark a war between them which would in turn devastate their world fatally wounding his sister, Izaya's first wife, after which he opted to kill all the wounded Old Gods, steal their powers and bring about a new order. One by one, the Old Gods were destroyed by Darkseid, who became more horrific in turn as he leeched their essence from them. As Darkseid's schemes started to tear the planet apart, Highfather ran with his wounded Avia in hand towards one of the last and greatest of the Old Gods, acknowledging his time had come and passed he chose to pass on the last of his power to reward Izaya's beloved's devotion to them. Empowered in a blinding flare of light, Highfather arose as a New God to battle Darkseid. The brothers, now equal, tore the world apart during their battle, leaving them to rebuild on the remains, which became Apokolips and New Genesis.

It was his search for what was believed to be his daughter Kaiyo that Darkseid came to traverse and enslave various worlds and universes throughout the 52 realities spanning existence, leading up to his first invasion of Earth 2 as well as the incursion of countless other Earths along the DCnU, up until the core world of Prime Earth where he battled and lost against the Justice League when they first formed to battle his invasion.

After countless eons of infighting proceeding after the fall of the Old World, Darkseid and Highfather would eventually be forced into conflict against their demented father and King of the Old Gods, Yuga Khan. Livid at the fact his sons ended up killing and usurping the powers of all the Old Gods of Urgrund save himself, he utilized the power of the Anti-Life Equation to reanimate his fallen subjects, while using his own powers to suppress his sons' New God Abilities, all to prevent the rise of the New Gods standing before him. When Zonuz was prepping to deliver the killing blow, Uxas crept up from behind and ended him, reducing his resurrected army back to the dust they were recreated from and sending the Old God back to the Source.

For a time, both brothers would raise their dead world back from the devastation wreaked by their previous conflicts, dubbing it Genesis with Izaya eventually remarrying, up until for undisclosed reasons Darkseid killed Highfather's new wife away from prying eyes, save those of his sibling's. Another war would commence pitting the former's faction against the self-titled God of Evil, which devastated the world they made together. With the losses tallied on both sides, a ceasefire was eventually called with Darkseid eventually slinking back into the darkness, while Highfather wept over the loss of their new home. Over time, a peace treaty would be forged in which Izaya would lose the compassionate part of himself to the Source to make him go through with it. Exchanging their sons like in the previous continuity would not stop Darkseid from waging wars of conquest across reality however, so Highfather brokered another treaty where Darkseid would only attack the Earth 2 dimension while leaving the other infinite Earths untouched.

Over time, the core universe where Apokolips first suffered defeat from would have more interactions with the New Gods of both New Genesis; created by the now-militant Highfather, as well as those of Apokolips; domain of the malevolent Darkseid and his elite followers.

=== Volume 5 (2024–present) ===
The New Gods volume 5 is written by Ram V with art from Jorge Fornes and Evan Cagle. A continuation of the New Gods storyline from past volumes and recent DC stories, the volume depicts the aftermath of Darkseid's apparent death in DC All In Special. It centers on Orion's moral quandary after he is sent to Earth to kill "an emergent New God" infant who will "upset the balance" between Apokolips and New Genesis; the awakening of the child, Kamal, was the universe attempting to correct Darkseid's disappearance into the Absolute Universe through the creation of a god of evil. In parallel, the series deals with a plot from the Nyctari, a powerful alien species descended from the Old God Nyctar, who were previously enslaved by Darkseid and intend to commit genocide against the New Gods.

== Setting ==
=== New Genesis ===
New Genesis
- Art by George Pérez (penciller), Karl Kesel (inker), and Tom Ziuko (inker).
- Races: New Gods, Bugs

New Genesis and its dark counterpart Apokolips were spawned by the destruction of Urgrund, the world of the "Old Gods" (implied to be the gods of Norse mythology). New Genesis was given strength and nobility from the "living atoms" of the Old God Balduur, while Apokolips was saturated with evil from an unnamed sorceress. Through Darkseid's manipulation, the two planets entered a devastating war that only ended when the New Genesis general Izaya forsook the ways of war, contacted the Source and became the Highfather, agreeing to a pact with his enemy to secure peace. Eventually the pact was broken and the war restarted when Darkseid kidnapped people of Earth and Highfather directed warriors of New Genesis to oppose him.

Izaya, also known as Highfather, is a spiritual leader who maintains his people's connection to the Source. After his death, Highfather was succeeded by Takion, a living conduit of the Source. In contrast to the industrial wasteland of Apokolips, New Genesis is covered in lush forests and grasslands. The only urban location is Supertown, a floating city designed to not affect the planet's surface.

The conflict between the two planets symbolizes the struggle of good and evil on a grand mythic scale. However, despite representing good, New Genesis and its inhabitants are not entirely perfect. Biographer Charles Hatfield writes, "The saga turns out to be not so simple, for Kirby – and this is revealing – blurs the seeming idealized perfection of New Genesis, adding complexity to his gods." Similarly, John Morrow writes, "Kirby knew that his New Genesis was no heaven. Rather, it was more like the free West during the Cold War, which was threatened by forces from within as well as without."

Locations on New Genesis include:

- Asylum of the Gods – An insane asylum where New Gods who have gone mad are incarcerated.
- Bug Mound – The home of the Bugs of New Genesis.
- Lonar's Range – An area of wilderness where the Primitives live.
- Singularity Stockade – A multiversal prison.
- Supertown – A floating city that is the capital of New Genesis and the home of the New Gods.

==== Later continuity events ====
Both Apokolips and New Genesis were seemingly destroyed in a final conflict, similar to that which destroyed Urgrund, home of the Old Gods prior to Grant Morrison's Seven Soldiers: Mister Miracle mini-series. However, the final issue of that series implied that the story's earlier events were merely visions seen by the hero as part of an elaborate test by Metron. In the Death of the New Gods storyline, many of the New Gods are killed by Infinity-Man. The Source merges Apokolips and New Genesis into a single planet and indicates that it will possibly be repopulated. At the end of Final Crisis, the New Gods of Supertown were reborn.

In "The New 52" reboot, New Genesis' surface is littered with the ruins of previous cities that were devastated in its conflict with Apokolips. Additionally, New Genesis technology was used to create OMAC.

== Characters ==
=== New Gods of New Genesis ===
- Highfather – Izaya the inheritor, he serves as both the spiritual leader and the political leader of New Genesis.
- Antinoos – Head of Commerce on New Genesis.
- Astorr – The original Infinity-Man.
- Atinai – The builder of New Genesis' architecture, buildings, and cities.
- Avia – A flyer, the first wife and advisor of Izaya the inheritor, who will become Highfather. She is later killed by Steppenwolf.
- Avia II – The daughter of Scott and Barda Free, granddaughter of Izaya, Avia and Big Breeda and adopted niece of Orion and Bekka of the Kingdom Come reality.
- Big Barda – The former leader of the Female Furies and Scott Free's wife.
- Black Racer – An elemental force capable of dealing death with a single touch, avatar of Death in the DC Comics universe who often hunts those affiliated with the New Gods.
- Bugs – A species of humanoid insects.
  - All-Widow – Queen of the Bugs of New Genesis.
  - Forager – A warrior Bug of New Genesis and ally of Orion.
  - Forager – A female warrior Bug of New Genesis and successor of the first Forager.
  - Prime One – The leader of the Bugs of New Genesis and Forager's mentor.
- Celestia – A flier, friend of Harmon.
- Council of Eight – A group of New Gods who receive their orders from Highfather.
  - Bekka – Himon's daughter, who can also heal others and manipulate and amplify their emotions.
  - Hyalt – A cybernetically enhanced blacksmith.
  - Lightray – A photokinetic warrior.
  - Metron – A supreme explorer, scientist, and inventor who rides in the time-traveling Mobius Chair.
  - Orion – The second son of Uxas / Darkseid, adoptive son of Highfather, half-brother of Kalibak and Grayven and husband of Bekka.
  - Lady Shadowfall – An archer who is a general in the New Genesis army.
  - Uggha – General of New Genesis who obeys the will of Highfather.
- Council of Five – A group that works under Highfather.
  - Commander Gideon – A high-ranking general in the New Genesis army.
  - Lonar – An explorer of New Genesis, he was the first to discover the remnants of the Old Gods.
  - Madame Nature – Security chief.
  - Teledar – A science officer.
- Desdemona – A teacher for the children of Supertown who is Metron's former lover.
- Divine Guard – The foot soldiers of New Genesis that work for Highfather and the allies of Orion.
- Enkar – Guardian of the New Gods' after-realm of Hadis.
- Fastbak – A young god from Supertown who appeared The New Gods #5. He uses Aero-Pads that enable him to fly and have super-speed.
- Forever People – A group of young New Gods from New Genesis who came to Earth for adventure. The team traveled using their unique "Super-Cycle" and a portable "living computer" called 'Mother Box'. Together they are allies of Infinity-Man.
  - Beautiful Dreamer – A sensitive with psychic powers that allow her to create illusions and to scan people's minds to produce familiar images.
  - Big Bear – Pilot of the 'Super-Cycle', with vast strength that is further enhanced by a flow of high-density atoms.
  - Mark Moonrider – Possesses a Megaton Touch that enables him to generate lethal bolts of energy.
  - Serifan – A sensitive with limited telepathic powers, who also wields "cosmic cartridges" that serve various purposes.
  - Vykin – Has the power to trace and reconstruct atomic patterns, manipulate magna-power. Vykin is the holder of the Forever People's Mother Box.
- Harmon – A New God of music and melody, slain by Mad Harriet of the Female Furies.
- Himon – Apokolips resistance leader, mentor of Mister Miracle, inventor of the Mother Box, father of Bekka.
- Infinity-Man – A powerful warrior, Drax is the older brother of Darkseid and an ally of the Forever People.
- Jezebelle – A former student of Granny Goodness who defected to New Genesis.
- Jigundus – A warrior with super-strength and enhanced durability who appeared in Superman/Aliens.
- K'zandr – A keeper of Highfather's Oracle with precognition.
- Magnar – An Orion-level warrior who protected Supertown.
- Malhedron – A former servant of Darkseid who defected to New Genesis and a former member of the Council of Eight. A General of New Genesis who obeys the will of Highfather, Also as leader of "The Wheel".
- Mister Miracle – The son of Highfather and Vayla, Scott Free was traded for Orion and raised on Apokolips. Husband of Big Barda.
- Monitors of New Genesis – The aerial police of Supertown. Not to be confused with the Monitors.
- Primitives – A species of indigenous peoples from the forests of New Genesis.
  - Aarden – A warrior from the Primitives.
  - Mother Herrae – The leader of the Primitives and one of the original New Gods.
  - Sserpa – A warrior from the Primitives.
- Seagrin – The water-loving New God. Slain by the Deep Six.
- Sister Sunlight – A New God with healing powers. She originated as a "lowlie" on Apokolips before Himon emigrated her to Earth.
- Stanga – A hermit.
- Takion – The embodiment of the Source.
- The Wheel – A group of warrior sisters who defected to New Genesis and led by Malhedron, who works under Highfather. They consist of Lady Dia, Lady Kor, and Lady Rad.
- Teledar – A disembodied head in a floating orb device.
- Thunderer – Lonar's battle horse and a survivor of Ragnarok.
- Valkyra the Commander – Vykin's mother who rides a winged robot horse and is an expert at hand-to-hand combat.
- Vayla – The second wife of Highfather and the mother of Scott Free.

=== New Gods of Apokolips ===
- Darkseid – The ruler of Apokolips and the father of Orion, Kalibak, Grayven, and Grail.
- Aerotroopers – The winged minions of Darkseid.
- Agogg – A massive ape-like minion who targeted Ellis Ames for the Anti-Life Equation that he had. He was killed by Darkseid's Omega Beams when Ames claimed that he gave the Anti-Life Equation to him.
- Antagonist – A minion of Darkseid who is an embodiment of hatred and rage.
- Berelda – A female servant of Darkseid.
- Brimstone – A being who was artificially created by Darkseid.
- Buna – A warrior of Apokolips and daughter of Kalibre that appears in Superman (vol. 2) #104.
- Canis Major – A minion of Darkseid in dog-themed armor.
- Canis Minor – A minion of Darkseid in dog-themed armor and the son of Canis Major.
- Captain Hathak – The former lover of Tigra and the possible father of Orion. He was later killed by Darkseid.
- Commander Tusk – A commander in Darkseid's army.
- Concord & Harmon – The minions of Darkseid.
- Control – A communications officer.
- Cyborg-87 – A red robot and minion of Darkseid.
- Darkseid's Elite – The elite warriors of Darkseid.
  - Amazing Grace – A master manipulator.
  - Bane – A minion of Darkseid from New Gods #18.
  - Brola – A member of Darkseid's Elite who has a "Hand of Stone."
  - DeSaad – A torturer and Darkseid's right hand and advisor.
  - Devilance – A hunter. He was killed by Lobo.
  - Doctor Bedlam – A pure energy being and enemy of Mister Miracle who wields a series of artificial bodies.
  - Glorious Godfrey – A master manipulator who is adept at bending huge masses of people to his will. He is the older brother of Amazing Grace.
  - Granny Goodness – The supervisor of the Female Furies and keeper of Apokolips's horrid orphanages.
  - Kalibak – The son of Darkseid and Suli who serves as the second-in-command of Apokolips.
  - Kanto – A master assassin.
  - Lady Justeen – The second-in-command of DeSaad, a.k.a. Meteorra Mayhem.
  - Mantis – A bug-like warrior from the Bugs of Apokolips.
  - Mortalla – A servant of Darkseid who can induce sleep with one hand and death with another. She was once a mortal, but was heavily modified to serve Darkseid.
  - Steppenwolf – Darkseid's uncle who is the general in his armies.
  - Titan – A massive, green-skinned warrior and member of Darkseid's Elite from The New Gods #18.
  - Virman Vundabar – An expert strategist and sycophant who is the father of Malice Vundabar.
- Deep Six – The fish-like warriors who have fought the New Gods of New Genesis as well as Aquaman.
  - Gole – A member of the Deep Six who wears a helmet that covers his face and wields bladed weapons.
  - Jaffar – A green-armored member of the Deep Six who can mutate other beings with his touch.
  - Kurin – A gold-armored member of the Deep Six who often wields a trident.
  - Shaligo – A member of the Deep Six whose wing-like fins enable him to fly.
  - Slig – A blue-armored member of the Deep Six who can disintegrate an object or mutate other beings with his touch.
  - Trok – An axe-wielding member of the Deep Six who wears a copper helmet.
- Dog Cavalry – Warriors on dog-like mounts that are commanded by Steppenwolf.
- Ericht – A Theta drone.
- Esak – A brilliant young man from Supertown who was Metron's protégé. He was destined to take Metron's place one day as cosmic explorer and master technologist, until he was injured in an accident which damaged him both physically and mentally. His soul and faith were embittered badly and he soon turned against Metron and his New Genesis allies by joining the ranks of Darkseid's Elite. Orion finally confronted Esak and killed him; but before he died, Orion, still respectful for Esak's past self, prayed to the Source for Esak and his face was healed before he finally died.
- Female Furies – A group of female warriors that work for Granny Goodness.
  - Artemiz – The archer of the Female Furies.
  - Bernadeth – A knife-wielding member of the Female Furies who is Granny Goodness' right-hand woman and is the most intelligent of the group. Sister of DeSaad.
  - Big Breeda – The mother of Big Barda, grandmother of Avia II (Kingdom Come), mother-in-law of Scott Free, and sister-in-law of Avia I and Izaya.
  - Bloody Mary – A mind-controlling vampire-themed member of the Female Furies.
  - Gilotina – A member of the Female Furies whose super-strength enables her to chop through anything.
  - Lashina – A whip-wielding member of the Female Furies. She was also known as Duchess when she was in the Suicide Squad.
  - Mad Harriet – A wild member of the Female Furies with claws.
  - Malice Vundabar – The daughter of Vermin Vundabar.
    - Chessure – A creature controlled by Malice Vundabar.
  - Speed Queen – A member of the Female Furies who roller skates give her superhuman speed.
  - Stompa – A super-strong member of the Female Furies who wears anti-matter boots.
  - Wunda – A light-manipulating member of the Female Furies.
- Grail – The daughter of Darkseid and the Amazon Myrina.
- Grayven – The third son of Darkseid whose mother is unknown.
- Gravi-Guards – The hulking minions of Darkseid who are able to become super-dense. They debuted in Jack Kirby's Fourth World #12.
- Harassers – They serve as the security guards at Granny Goodness' orphanages.
  - Marvelous Marno – An inventor and member of the Harassers.
- Heggra – The mother of Darkseid.
- Hunger Dogs – Also called "Lowlies", they are the downtrodden citizens of Apokolips who reside in the Armagetto district.
  - Jovita – A rebel Hunger Dog from Armagetto.
  - Kyta – A rebel Hunger Dog from Armagetto.
- Infernus – The pyrokinetic minion of Darkseid who was sent to obtain a powerful sword that was to be delivered to Metron.
- Iota – A minion of Darkseid.
- Jet-Bow Squad – The soldiers of Apokolips who wield Jet-Bows.
- Justifiers – The slaves of Glorious Godfrey. They are mind-controlled by the Anti-Life Equation, which also powers their weapons. In Final Crisis, they appear as the foot soldiers of Darkseid and Libra.
- Kalibre – An assassin who is the father of Buna.
- Killroy – The son of Steppenwolf.
- Lakutha – A midwife who was slain by Tigra to hide Orion's true parentage.
- Little Barda – A warrior who idolized Big Barda and fled to Earth.
- Lucifar – A minion of Darkseid who was sent by Darkseid to live with an Alaskan family.
- Master Mayhem – A minion of Darkseid. He was killed by Doomsday.
- Merritz – A troll-like servant who was abandoned in Hawaii by Darkseid and encountered by Ray. Killed upon Brimstone's activation.
- Mokkari – An evil scientist and the head of the Evil Factory.
- Necromina – A female minion of Darkseid and commander of the "Graveyard Army" who can raise and control the dead with her "Mortis Mark."
- Nurse Maggit – An assistant to DeSaad with maggot-like hair.
- Orion – The second son of Darkseid, who was raised on New Genesis.
- Pacifiers – Giant red robots that enforce peace through force. They appear in Superman (vol. 2) #3.
- Parademon – The common foot soldiers of Apokolips.
  - 3g4 – A Parademon that fought against its programming after an encounter with Aquaman. He was killed by Topkick.
  - Junior Jumbo – A Parademon.
  - Pharzoof – A Parademon with a mind of his own.
  - Topkick – A Parademon drill instructor.
- Photon Patrol – The regular soldiers using Parademon flying harnesses from Mister Miracle #25
- Power Boy – A friend of Little Barda who fled from Apokolips with her. Power Boy was briefly a member of the Teen Titans during the one-year gap after the events of Infinite Crisis.
- Precious – A failed potential recruit for the Female Furies.
- Protector Willik – The Armagetto district's protector who wields a throw-club. Killed by a bomb that was used by Himon.
- Pythia – The keeper of Darkseid's Oracle with precognition who also controls Apokolips's Garden of Hope.
- Red One – An assistant to Meteorra.
- Rip Roar – A four-armed warrior who fled to Earth after stealing a New Genesis Super-Cycle and being trapped in stone. Rip Roar later battled Young Justice upon being freed from his stone prison when his Super-Cycle was activated.
- Servitors – The giant armored minions of Darkseid.
- Simyan – An ape-like DNAlien who runs the Evil Factory along with Mokkari.
- Sleez – The former boyhood friend of Uxas.
- Stingaree – An arachnid warrior from the Bugs of Apokolips.
- Suicide Jockeys – A group of non-humans who are fitted with flying harnesses and suicide bombs and speak in rhyme.
- Suli – The wife of Darkseid and mother of Kalibak.
- Techno-Chiefs – Four of the Techno-Chiefs accompanied Darkseid in trying to get information from Metron's Mobius Chair.
- Tigra – The wife of Darkseid and the mother of Orion.
- Tygar the Tearer – A saber-toothed gladiator.
- Tyrus – A minion of Darkseid who is one of Apokolips's greatest assassins. He later defects to New Genesis.
  - Tracker – A giant-sized three-headed hound that serves Tyrus.
- Warhounds – Robotic dogs created by DeSaad and his team of scientists.
- Yuga Khan – The father of Darkseid.

== Powers and abilities ==
The beings of New Genesis and Apokolips call themselves gods, living outside of normal time and space in an extradimensional realm known as the Fourth World. Due to their proximity to the Source, a primeval energy, these New Gods have evolved into genetically stable higher beings of evolutionary perfection.

All of the New Gods possess superhuman abilities of various kinds and differing degrees, including superhuman strength, stamina, reflexes, invulnerability and speed. The denizens of New Genesis and Apokolips are extremely long-lived, perhaps immortal.

Despite their near-immortality, the New Gods are vulnerable to a substance called Radion. Its source is unknown and its effects are toxic only in sustained amounts or after explosive exposure. The average New God can be slain by an application of Radion from a Radion blaster or bomb.

Writer Rachel Pollack introduced the idea in "Sacrifice of the Gods" in 1996 that the New Gods were giants and that the Boom Tube would shrink them as they traveled to normal time and space or enlarge beings who traveled to the Fourth World realm. For example, if Superman were to travel to Apokolips under his own power, he would be miniature in comparison to the New Gods – Orion remarked that "Earth is but a speck in an air pocket" and that the universe of New Genesis is the "real world". Proportionally, entire planets are shown to seem no larger than golf balls.

== Bibliography ==
Outside of the original three Kirby titles, and those strictly labeled "New Gods", other characters from Kirby's Fourth World have had their own titles. Mister Miracle has had numerous other iterations of his own comic, and Orion was given his own title in 2000 that ended in 2002. The aforementioned Jack Kirby's Fourth World is another example, as is Takion, a New God not created by Kirby, but one that had his own series for seven issues in 1996. The New Gods and their concepts have at times played a central role in the DC Universe, in series such as Jim Starlin's Cosmic Odyssey. Particularly, the character Darkseid has been a major force in the DC Universe, and is a recurring antagonist in the various Superman titles.

=== Tales of the New Gods ===
"Tales of the New Gods" was a backup feature that began in John Byrne's Jack Kirby's Fourth World, and continued in Walt Simonson's Orion series. In the features for Jack Kirby's Fourth World, Byrne almost exclusively provided the pencils and text for the stories. In the features for the Orion title, Simonson often wrote the story, and fellow artists would, appropriately, provide the artwork; although on rare occasions, other writers would provide the script/story. Two backup stories, though not under the "Tales of the New Gods" banner, were printed when Byrne filled in as penciller on Orion for the main stories in issues #13 and #14, with Simonson providing writing and pencilling, and Bob Wiacek inking.

=== Collected editions ===
The various New Gods stories have been collected into various volumes. All 11 issues of the original series have been collected into Jack Kirby's New Gods (ISBN 1563893851). DC Comics published a Tales of the New Gods trade paperback (ISBN 978-1401216375) in January 2008, which collects all of the back-up stories listed above, a Mark Evanier/Steve Rude Mister Miracle one-shot comic from 1987, and a previously unpublished story by Mark Millar and Steve Ditko originally meant to be printed in the pages of Orion. In 2008, DC released a one-shot titled Countdown Special: New Gods #1, which reprinted Forever People #1, Mister Miracle #1, and New Gods #7. Death of the New Gods has been collected into a hardcover edition (ISBN 1401218393). and later reprinted in trade paperback.

The entirety of Kirby's work on the "Fourth World" was collected in four Omnibus editions published in 2007 and 2008:

- Jack Kirby's Fourth World Omnibus
  - Volume 1 collects Forever People #1–3, Mister Miracle #1–3, The New Gods #1–3, Superman's Pal Jimmy Olsen #133–139, 396 pages, May 2007, ISBN 978-1401213442 (hardcover); December 2011, ISBN 978-1401232412 (paperback)
  - Volume 2 collects Forever People #4–6, Mister Miracle #4–6, The New Gods #4–6, Superman's Pal Jimmy Olsen #141–145, 396 pages, August 2007, ISBN 978-1401213572 (hardcover); April 2012, ISBN 978-1401234409 (paperback)
  - Volume 3 collects Forever People #7–10, Mister Miracle #7–9, The New Gods #7–10, Superman's Pal Jimmy Olsen #146–148, 396 pages, November 2007, ISBN 978-1401214852 (hardcover); August 2012, ISBN 978-1401235352 (paperback)
  - Volume 4 collects Forever People #11; Mister Miracle #10–18; The New Gods #11; "Even Gods Must Die" from The New Gods (vol. 2) #6; DC Graphic Novel #4: The Hunger Dogs; "On the Road to Armagetto!" (previously unpublished), 424 pages, March 2008, ISBN 978-1401215835 (hardcover); December 2012, ISBN 978-1401237462 (paperback)

== In other media ==
=== Television ===
- Darkseid, Kalibak, DeSaad, and the planet Apokolips appear in Super Friends.
- Various New Gods characters appear in the DC Animated Universe, with Kalibak, Darkseid, and the Fourth World characters making their initial appearance in Superman: The Animated Series. They later appear in Justice League and Justice League Unlimited.
- Darkseid, Kalibak, Granny Goodness, Lashina, and Stompa appear in Batman: The Brave and the Bold.
- Many of the New Gods characters, such as Darkseid, Granny Goodness, DeSaad, and Godfrey, appear in the final season of Smallville.
- Various New Gods appear in Young Justice: Darkseid, the Forever People, DeSaad, Glorious Godfrey, Granny Goodness, Metron, Highfather, and Lightray. Antinoös, Celestia, Grayven, and the Hunger Dogs also appear in minor roles.

=== Film ===
- The evil New Gods are referenced throughout Batman v Superman: Dawn of Justice (2016). In one deleted scene from the film, which is included in the Ultimate Edition extended cut, Lex Luthor communicates with Steppenwolf using technology from a Kryptonian scout ship.
- The New Gods feature prominently in Justice League (2017), with the main antagonist being Steppenwolf (Ciarán Hinds). Exiled from Apokolips, Steppenwolf invades Earth in command of an army of Parademons, hunting down the three Mother Boxes located thereon. The Mother Boxes are hidden among the united forces of Earth, located in Atlantis, Themyscira and by mankind. Cyborg is created through the aid of a Mother Box, and has a connection to their power. The New Gods Darkseid (Ray Porter), DeSaad (Peter Guinness), and Granny Goodness (portrayed via CGI) were meant to appear in the film, but were cut following Snyder's departure from the project. They did appear in the director's cut of the film, Zack Snyder's Justice League (2021). Snyder intended to include all the New Gods in his planned Justice League sequels, which went unproduced.
- A New Gods live-action film was in development from 2018 to 2021. It was planned to be directed by Ava DuVernay, originally with a script written by Kario Salem, but later with a script written by DuVernay and Tom King. Darkseid was planned to be the main antagonist of the film, but the film was also planned to include the Female Furies and All-Widow, among others.
- George Lucas's Star Wars series has been speculated to be influenced by the New Gods. At a 1972 dinner that included comics writer/editor Roy Thomas and comic shop owner Ed Summer, George Lucas told his story for Star Wars, after which Roy Thomas noted that it sounded very similar to Jack Kirby's New Gods.
- An alternate universe version of Bekka as Wonder Woman appears in the 2015 animated film Justice League: Gods and Monsters.
- Darkseid appears in the DC Animated Movie Universe, serving as a primary antagonist in the films Justice League: War, Reign of the Supermen and Justice League Dark: Apokolips War. Additionally, writer J. M. DeMatteis was interested in scripting a New Gods film set in this franchise.

=== Video games ===
- Several New God characters appear in DC Universe Online, including Mister Miracle, Big Barda, Kalibak, Mantis, Orion, Lightray, Steppenwolf, Darkseid, Grail, Granny Goodness, and the Female Furies Stompa, Lashina, and Mad Harriet, along with several Bugs and Parademons. New Genesis and Apokolips appear as levels.
- Multiple New Gods appear as unlockable playable characters in LEGO DC Super-Villains, including Darkseid, Kalibak, Grail, Granny Goodness, the Female Furies, and Steppenwolf. Apokolips appears as a hub area.

== Awards ==
This series, along with Forever People, Mister Miracle, and Superman's Pal Jimmy Olsen won Jack Kirby a Shazam Award for "Special Achievement by an Individual" in 1971.

In 1998, Jack Kirby's New Gods by Jack Kirby, edited by Bob Kahan, won both the Harvey Award for "Best Domestic Reprint Project" and the Eisner Award for "Best Archival Collection/Project".

== See also ==
Other notable Fourth World characters and concepts:

- Anti-Life Equation
- Jack Kirby bibliography
- Mother Box
- Source
- Source Wall

Similar Marvel Comics characters:

- Eternals, a race of godlike human beings also created by Jack Kirby
