= Source (comics) =

Fictional concept from Jack Kirby comics

The Source is a metaphysical concept created by writer-artist Jack Kirby for his Fourth World series of comic books. It first appeared in New Gods #1 (February 1971).

== History ==
The Source is depicted as a creator deity, responsible for all that exists in the known universe. Mostly associated with the New Gods, the Source is the supposed origin of the "Godwave" that gave the "gods" of the DC Universe their divine abilities. At the edge of the Promethean Galaxy is the "Source Wall", which prevents the Source from being directly seen; those who have tried are instantly turned to stone and forcibly merged with the Wall.

=== Death of the New Gods ===
While investigating the death of the New Gods, Metron became the first being to make contact with the Source. The Source explained that the deaths were part of a larger plan to build a new "Fifth World".

When pressed by Metron, it also revealed that the most powerful gods of three pantheons of the Second World - the "Old Gods" - had attacked it in the past, triggering a split in its essence that brought forth the Anti-Life Equation. In retribution, the Source destroyed the Old Gods and created the New Gods. However, its diminished state caused the New Gods to be born with serious flaws. The Source sought to reunite with its other half and start anew. It takes advantage of the actions of Lex Luthor and Rip Hunter to create the 52 worlds of the multiverse to ease the reunion. Using its agent, Infinity-Man, to kill the New Gods and store their souls in a second Source Wall and Mister Miracle as the user of the Anti-Life Equation, the Source breaches the primary Source Wall and reunites with its Anti-Life half.

With all the New Gods dead but one, the Source travels to Apokolips to confront the final god, Darkseid. Darkseid had devised a method to tap into the power of the souls of the New Gods which were being stored in the second Source Wall, giving him equal footing with the Source. However, Superman intervenes, allowing the Source to deploy Orion against Darkseid. With the two sides distracted, the Source then successfully merges New Genesis and Apokolips into a single planet, signaling the birth of the Fifth World.

=== DC Rebirth ===
The Source's origin is retold in DC Rebirth, when twenty billion years ago, the Source forms the first sentience, Perpetua, to create new systems of life within the greater omniverse. While Perpetua complied, she secretly sought to displace the Source and become supreme being of the emerging reality. Thus, she created the first multiverse by using the seven hidden forces of the universe as a self-sustaining weapon against her masters and also created her children from the "Overvoid" to monitor each realm of matter within her multiverse.

Five billion years later, Perpetua merged the humans and the Martians to create an army of apex predators to prepare herself to go to war against the Judges of the Source. Perpetua's sons alert the judges, who send a "cosmic raptor" to seal her within the Source Wall. Following the destruction of the Green Lantern Corps and having absorbed the energy of the Godstorm, John Stewart has increased his powers to a level never seen before, elevating him to practical godhood. As John overflows with power to the point it seems as though he is dissipating, a mysterious voice calls to him saying "You know me John. Everybody does". Standing before the ascended Lantern is a physical manifestation of the Source, taking the form of Jack Kirby.

== In other media ==
- The Force from Star Wars may be partially inspired by the Source.
- The Source Wall appears in the Justice League Unlimited episode "Destroyer". Metron guides Lex Luthor there at his request; when told by Metron that only a "twelfth-level intellect" could comprehend the nature of the Source, Luthor arrogantly dismissed his warning and entered the Wall, before emerging with the knowledge of how to fully wield the Anti-Life Equation against Darkseid.
- In Injustice: Gods Among Us, Brother Eye is equipped with Source energy scanners.
