= Justice League: Gods and Monsters =

2015 film directed by Sam Liu

- Blu-ray cover
- Directed by: Sam Liu
- Screenplay by: Alan Burnett
- Story by: Alan Burnett; Bruce Timm
- Produced by: Sam Register; Bruce Timm
- Starring: Benjamin Bratt; Michael C. Hall; Tamara Taylor
- Edited by: Christopher D. Lozinski
- Music by: Frederik Wiedmann
- Production companies: Warner Bros. Animation; DC Entertainment; MOI Animation (Animation services)
- Distributed by: Warner Home Video
- Release dates: July 21, 2015 (Digital); July 28, 2015 (Physical)
- Running time: 76 minutes
- Country: United States
- Language: English

Justice League: Gods and Monsters is a 2015 American animated superhero film and the 24th film of the DC Universe Animated Original Movies. It features an alternate universe version of the DC Comics superhero team the Justice League. It was released as a download on July 21, 2015, and released on DVD and Blu-ray on July 28.

== Plot ==
In an alternate universe, the Justice League—Batman (Kirk Langstrom), Wonder Woman (Bekka), and Superman (Hernan Guerra, son of General Zod)— is an autonomous brutal force that maintains order on Earth and has mixed public reception. Scientists Victor Fries, Ray Palmer, and Silas Stone, along with his young son Victor, are killed by methods similar to the Justice League. President Amanda Waller asks they cooperate with the government's investigation. Meanwhile, Superman invites Lois Lane to the Tower of the Justice, where he tells her of his goals to help humanity and reveals how little he knows about Krypton or his heritage.

Batman discovers an email sent to Silas and several scientists, including Will Magnus, Kirk's best friend who helped with his transformation. He asks Magnus and his wife Tina about "Project Fair Play", which involved scientists under Lex Luthor's employ; Magnus offers to ask what the others know. Magnus gathers the remaining scientists (John Henry Irons, Thomas Morrow, Michael Holt, Pat Dugan, Emil Hamilton, Karen Beecher, Thaddeus Sivana, Kimiyo Hoshi, and Stephen Shin) for answers. However, they are attacked by three robot assassins who travel via Boom Tube. Despite their efforts, the assassins leave Magnus as the sole survivor of the attack.

The League takes Magnus to the Tower to recover, while Superman flies to Luthor's satellite orbiting the Moon. Luthor reveals the Project is a way to destroy the League if necessary; he also reveals the truth about Zod to Superman. As Superman leaves, a robot assassin who has Superman's powers arrives and destroys the satellite, seemingly killing Luthor. Steve Trevor shows satellite footage of the explosion and Superman's presence to Waller. She retaliates with Project Fair Play, which consists of troops and vehicles armed with energy weapons powered by red solar radiation that weaken Superman.

Superman and Wonder Woman face the army while Batman stays inside the Tower, where he activates the forcefield, thinking Magnus can clear the League. Tina appears and subdues Batman before transforming into a liquid metal robot named Platinum and reviving Magnus with an organic nanite serum that enhances his strength and healing. Magnus then reveals that he had killed Tina in a fit of rage after realizing she was in love with Kirk. Believing that there is no hope for humanity, Magnus orchestrated everything using his Metal Men with the intent to detonate a Nanite Bomb to link humanity in a hive mind. He joined Fair Play for its resources to fund his secret Nanite Bomb project.

As Magnus prepares his weapon, Luthor, who escaped the explosion, teleports into the middle of the battle outside and tells everyone he has discovered Magnus' plan. Batman frees himself and seizes the opportunity to drop the forcefield. With Batman fighting Magnus, Wonder Woman faces Platinum, and Superman takes on the Metal Men, who merge into a single robot and ambush him. Wonder Woman uses a Boom Tube to send Platinum into the sun. Simultaneously, Superman destroys the Mother Boxes inside the unified Metal Man before taking it underground and melting it in molten rock. The League destroys the bomb, and, after being defeated by Batman, a remorseful Magnus commits suicide by disintegrating himself with nanites.

A week later, the Justice League has been cleared of all wrongdoing, and the world, along with Lois Lane, views them differently. Bekka decides to leave the Justice League to face her past along with Luthor, who wants to explore other universes after growing bored with this one. Before leaving, Luthor gives Superman all the data on Krypton and tells him to be a "real hero". The film ends with Superman and Batman deciding to use the data to help humanity.

== Cast ==
- Michael C. Hall as Kirk Langstrom / Batman
- Benjamin Bratt as Hernan Guerra / Superman
- Tamara Taylor as Bekka / Wonder Woman
- Paget Brewster as Lois Lane
- C. Thomas Howell as Will Magnus
- Jason Isaacs as Lex Luthor
- Dee Bradley Baker as Ray Palmer, Tin
- Eric Bauza as Ryan Choi, Stephen Shin
- Larry Cedar as Pete Ross
- Richard Chamberlain as Highfather
- Trevor Devall as Emil Hamilton, Lightray
- Dan Gilvezan as Pat Dugan
- Grey Griffin as Tina / Platinum
- Daniel Hagen as Doctor Sivana
- Penny Johnson Jerald as President Amanda Waller
- Josh Keaton as Orion
- Arif S. Kinchen as Michael Holt, Cheetah
- Yuri Lowenthal as Jor-El, Jimmy Olsen
- Carl Lumbly as Silas Stone
- Jim Meskimen as Victor Fries
- Taylor Parks as Victor Stone
- Khary Payton as John Henry Irons, Granny Goodness, Punk Mugger
- Tahmoh Penikett as Steve Trevor
- Andrea Romano as Jean Palmer
- André Sogliuzzo as Cop, Mr. Guerra
- Bruce Thomas as General Zod, Darkseid
- Lauren Tom as Lara Lor-Van, Kimiyo Hoshi
- Marcelo Tubert as Blockbuster, Tough Guy
- Kari Wahlgren as Karen Beecher, Livewire
- Tara Strong as Harlequin

== Crew ==
- Andrea Romano – Casting and Voice Director

== Reception ==
The film earned $2,990,638 from domestic home video sales.

It received mostly positive reviews from critics. Based on 8 reviews collected on Rotten Tomatoes, the film has an approval rating of 88% with an average rating of 8.10.

Kofi Outlaw from Screen Rant gave the film 5 out of 5 stars, praising Timm's and Burnett's writing, the new versions of the DC Trinity, the fight scenes and characters and calling it "a must-see for any DC fan". Joshua Yehl of IGN gave the film an 8.9/10 praising the concept, Wonder Woman's origin story, the voice acting, and the use of violence.

== Tie-in media ==
=== Companion series ===
In the weeks before the debut of the film, a three-part series, Justice League: Gods and Monsters Chronicles, which focused on the characters and universe of the film, was released online by Machinima on June 8, 2015. The series is the first collaboration between Warner Bros. and Machinima, following the former's investment of $18 million in Machinima in March 2014. The series is also the first production of Blue Ribbon Content, a digital content production unit of Warner Bros. formed in 2014 and led by the president of Warner Bros. Animation Sam Register.

The first season consisted of three episodes concluding on June 12, 2015. A second season of the series was planned to be released in 2016 and would have featured ten episodes, but was shelved.

=== Comic book series ===
A series of one-shot comics written by J. M. DeMatteis and Bruce Timm was released and focused on each hero's origin story. Additionally, a three-issue prequel comic book series written by DeMatteis and Timm was also released.

Title	Issue(s)	Publication date(s)	Writer(s)	Artist(s)	Ref(s).
Justice League: Gods and Monsters – Batman	1	July 22, 2015	Bruce Timm and J.M. DeMatteis	Mathew Dow Smith	
Justice League: Gods and Monsters – Superman	1 (print), 3 (digital)	print: July 29, 2015 digital: July 3, 2015 (chapter one sneak peek), July 4, 2015 (chapter one)	Bruce Timm and J.M. DeMatteis	Moritat	
Justice League: Gods and Monsters – Wonder Woman	1	August 5, 2015	Bruce Timm and J.M. DeMatteis	Dan Green and Rick Leonardi	
Justice League: Gods and Monsters	3 (print), 9 (digital)	print: August 12, 2015 (#1), August 19, 2015 (#2), August 26, 2015 (#3)	Bruce Timm and J.M. DeMatteis	Thony Silas	
Justice League: Gods and Monsters	1	Feb 3 2016 (hardcover), Feb 8 2017 (softcover)	all of above		
