= Forever People =

Fictional group of extraterrestrial superheroes in the DC universe

- The Forever People from The Forever People #1 (February 1971), art by Jack Kirby and Vince Colletta; from left to right: Vykin, Big Bear, Beautiful Dreamer, Mark Moonrider, and Serifan

Publication information
- Publisher: DC Comics
- First appearance: Forever People #1 (February-March 1971)
- Created by: Jack Kirby (writer/artist)

In-story information
- Member(s): Beautiful Dreamer; Big Bear; Infinity-Man; Mark Moonrider; Serifan; Vykin

The Forever People are a group of extraterrestrial superheroes appearing in American comic books published by DC Comics. They first appeared in Forever People #1 (cover-dated February-March 1971), and were created by Jack Kirby as part of his "Fourth World" epic.

== Publication history ==
The protagonists of the series are a group of young New Gods from New Genesis who were on a mission to oppose Darkseid on Earth, and talked, dressed, and acted much like the flower children of the 1960s. In addition to the individual abilities and equipment of the members, the group can join together using the technology of a Mother Box to summon the powerful hero Infinity-Man. The group travels by use of their Super-Cycle. The first issue of their title also introduced the Boom Tube, a type of portal used by the New Gods.

Their own title, The Forever People, debuted in 1971 and lasted 11 issues. They mainly fought Darkseid's forces, such as Glorious Godfrey in issue #3. Issues #9 and 10 guest-starred Deadman; according to writer/artist Jack Kirby's assistant Mark Evanier: "We were ordered to put Deadman into New Gods, but we slipped him into Forever People instead, where he was a little less obtrusive. Jack didn't like the character and didn't want to do it. He didn't feel he should be doing someone else's character. ... He doesn't want to trample on someone else's vision. Carmine said the character hadn't sold and he wanted the Kirby touch on it." The series ended with the Forever People stranded on the peaceful world of Adon.

In a 1986 interview, Kirby recalled that "the Forever People were the wonderful people of the '60s, who I loved. If you'll watch the actions of the Forever People, you'll see the reflection of the '60s in their attitudes, in the backgrounds, in their clothes. You'll see the '60s. I felt I would leave a record of the '60s in their adventures."

In 1988, a six-issue Forever People limited series by writer J. M. DeMatteis and artist Paris Cullins was published, showing what happens to the Forever People on Adon. This series reveals that the Forever People were originally humans who were saved from death and brought to New Genesis. They returned to Earth to oppose "the Darkness", a sentient but disembodied force of hopelessness. They were aided by a mysterious being, Maya, who is revealed to be the consciousness of their Mother Box.

In Death of the New Gods, the origin of the Forever People was retconned, and it is hinted that the five were to have been the first of the next evolution of the New Gods — godlings becoming more than the sum of their parts. Furthermore, the group are killed by Infinity-Man.

In the Final Crisis Sketchbook, the Forever People (along with other members of the New Gods) are given updated looks, which Grant Morrison calls "more gothic art school student than flower power". In the event itself, Japan's pop culture team, the Super Young Team, are revealed to be the Fifth World incarnation of the Forever People.

The Forever People appear in The New 52 series Infinity Man and the Forever People. Serifan is depicted as female and Vykin's sister.

== Original members ==
Members of the Forever People, on the cover of issue #9 (June-July 1972). From top to bottom: Big Bear, Vykin the Black, Mark Moonrider, Beautiful Dreamer, Serifan. Artists: Jack Kirby and Mike Royer

=== Beautiful Dreamer ===
During the original Kirby run, it was implied that Beautiful Dreamer was linked romantically to Mark Moonrider, although the exact nature of their relationship was never specified. In the 1988 miniseries, it was established that Dreamer had been married to Big Bear, and together they had a child, named Maya after the spirit of their old Mother Box. Since then, their marriage and daughter has been voided by a retcon during John Byrne's Jack Kirby's Fourth World series. When last shown, Dreamer was romantically involved with Takion.

In the out-of-continuity Elseworlds story Superman & Batman: Generations, Beautiful Dreamer and Superman marry and have two children, Lar-El and Vara. They and Beautiful Dreamer are later killed by Darkseid.

==== Powers and abilities ====
Like all the children of New Genesis, Beautiful Dreamer possesses the advanced physiology of a New God; she is extremely long-lived, has a limited degree of superhuman strength, resistance and reflexes. She is a skilled hand-to-hand combatant. She has psionic powers that allow her to create illusions and to scan people's minds to produce familiar images. These illusions are powerful enough to, for example, make someone believe they are leading a prisoner when they are only carrying empty chains. In addition, she has been able to feel the fluctuations within the Source.

=== Big Bear ===
Big Bear had been married to Beautiful Dreamer, and she had been pregnant with their daughter. A shift in time resulted in the marriage never happening and the child never having existed. This traumatized Beautiful Dreamer for a time. In Forever People #7, he was shown to have been responsible for the historical event that led to the legend of King Arthur.

==== Powers and abilities ====
A skilled hand-to-hand combatant, Big Bear is among the strongest of the children of New Genesis. He possesses superhuman strength, capable of bending steel and hurling giant redwood trees almost effortlessly. Big Bear's atomic structure is reinforced by a constant flow of high-density atoms, which he can direct at will to reinforce the power of his impacts. He is also the pilot of the Super-Cycle and an avid Earth history buff.

=== Mark Moonrider ===
During the original Kirby run, Beautiful Dreamer had been linked romantically to Mark Moonrider, although the exact nature of their relationship was never specified. In the 1988 miniseries set on Adon, Mark was shown to have fallen in love with, and later married, one of the natives, Mina. They had three children (Merry, Wendy and Starbright), but when the shift in time caused by the Darkness' actions undid the events which 'evolved' the natives, this marriage never occurred, leaving Mark with only his friends.

==== Powers and abilities ====
In addition to being extremely long-lived, Mark Moonrider has superhuman strength and reflexes and is resistant to conventional injury. Also, he has a keen mind with good leadership skills and he is well-trained in hand-to-hand combat. He possesses a Megaton Touch. With it, he can cause a tremendous explosion, and no doubt could easily kill with it if he and his companions were not sworn never to take a life. Used at low intensity, it can cause a severe shock. On one occasion, he used his megaton touch to turn solid rock into lava.

=== Serifan ===
Serifan is the youngest member of the group, as well as the most vulnerable. The Dark saw this and possessed Serifan, using him to conquer Forevertown and plague the Forever People. After the Dark was defeated he returned to his normal self.

==== Powers and abilities ====
Serifan possesses limited telepathic powers, and wields "cosmic cartridges" that serve various purposes when wielded. For example, the cartridges can link Serifan to the Source, create force fields, drain energy, manipulate gravity, modify atomic density, generate intense heat, power vehicles, and stun others. His "Blue Cartridge" can manipulate life force and was used to help Deadman merge with a "Follower", an organic machine designed to act as his physical body.

=== Vykin ===
Throughout the Kirby run, Vykin was referred to as "Vykin the Black". He was arguably the first black superhero to appear in a DC comic book, preceding the John Stewart Green Lantern and Kirby's Black Racer by several months. When the Forever People were stranded on Adon, Mark Moonrider thought it would be advantageous to civilize the people of the planet. When Vykin used their Mother Box to do so, it overloaded and was destroyed, killing Vykin in the process, but managing to create Forevertown. When the Dark overtook and reversed the effects of the Mother Box, Vykin was brought back to life. Later, he was reunited on New Genesis with his mother Valkyra, who sacrificed herself to save her lover Orion.

==== Powers and abilities ====
Like all New Gods, Vykin is functionally immortal and all his physical attributes are superhuman. He can manipulate magnetism and is skilled in working with complicated machinery. Vykin has a keen mind and is a skilled hand-to-hand combatant. It is Vykin who carries the Forever People's Mother Box, a kind of sentient computer, and is attuned to her frequencies. He is also a language major and a skilled tracker. He is considered "second only to Metron in wisdom".

=== Infinity-Man ===
Infinity-Man is Drax, the older brother of Uxas, and became the Infinity-Man after treachery at the hands of Uxas while attempting to harness the Omega Force for himself. No explanation was given as to why he was involved with the Forever People other than Big Bear's offhanded comment that they have an arrangement with him. The Infinity-Man's powers were never fully cataloged other than having some direct link to the Source, and the suggestion that since he originated from another universe, he was not bound by its physical laws. He is capable of flight, super-strength, enhanced vision powers, infini-beams, the ability to negate gravity and convert it into a repulsive force, restructuring atoms to pass through solid matter, and redirecting the flight path of bullets.

In The New 52 continuity reboot, Infinity-Man is an abstract of the Source itself and the moral consciousness of Highfather. Highfather was originally a compassionate being known as Izaya who visited the Source Wall, searching for answers from the Source itself. Izaya is hit by the Source, which makes him cold, tactile and manipulative. His lost conscience manifests as Infinity-Man.

== Fifth World ==
The Super Young Team are the contemporary Fifth World incarnations of the Forever People. Created by writer Grant Morrison in the early "52" stages of their DC Universe Final Crisis storyline, they are influenced by American super-heroes and Japanese pop culture, and were first mentioned in 52 #6. This group recruits Sonny Sumo, a powerful fighter who assisted the original Forever People in the first series.

== Other versions ==
The Un-People, a fusion of the Forever People and Marvel Comics group the Inhumans, appear in the Amalgam Comics one-shot Challengers of the Fantastic.

== In other media ==
=== Television ===
- The Forever People make a non-speaking appearance in the Justice League episode "Twilight".
- The Forever People appear in Young Justice, with Vykin voiced by Kevin Michael Richardson, Big Bear by Bill Fagerbakke, Beautiful Dreamer by Grey DeLisle, and Serifan by Dee Bradley Baker while Mark Moonrider has no dialogue.

=== Film ===
An alternate universe variant of Mark Moonrider makes a non-speaking cameo appearance in a flashback in Justice League: Gods and Monsters.

=== Video games ===
The Forever People appear as character summons in Scribblenauts Unmasked: A DC Comics Adventure.

=== Miscellaneous ===
The Forever People appear in the Justice League: Gods and Monsters tie-in comic as experiments created by Doctor Psycho.

== Collected editions ==
- Jack Kirby's The Forever People collects The Forever People #1–11, 288 pages, October 1999, ISBN 978-1563895104
- Jack Kirby's Fourth World Omnibus
  - Volume 1 collects Forever People #1–3, Mister Miracle #1–3, The New Gods #1–3, Superman's Pal Jimmy Olsen #133–139, 396 pages, May 2007, ISBN 978-1401213442 (hardcover); December 2011, ISBN 978-1401232412 (paperback)
  - Volume 2 collects Forever People #4–6, Mister Miracle #4–6, The New Gods #4–6, Superman's Pal Jimmy Olsen #141–145, 396 pages, August 2007, ISBN 978-1401213572 (hardcover); April 2012, ISBN 978-1401234409 (paperback)
  - Volume 3 collects Forever People #7–10, Mister Miracle #7–9, The New Gods #7–10, Superman's Pal Jimmy Olsen #146–148, 396 pages, November 2007, ISBN 978-1401214852 (hardcover); August 2012, ISBN 978-1401235352 (paperback)
  - Volume 4 collects Forever People #11; Mister Miracle #10–18; The New Gods #11; "Even Gods Must Die" from The New Gods vol. 2 #6; DC Graphic Novel #4: "The Hunger Dogs"; "On the Road to Armagetto!" (previously unpublished), 424 pages, March 2008, ISBN 978-1401215835 (hardcover); December 2012, ISBN 978-1401237462 (paperback)

== See also ==
- Jack Kirby bibliography
