= Death of the New Gods =

Comic book series published by DC Comics

- Cover to Death of the New Gods #1 (October 2007), art by Jim Starlin.

Publication information
- Publisher: DC Comics
- Schedule: Monthly
- Format: Limited series
- Publication date: December 2007 – June 2008
- No. of issues: 8
- Main character(s): New Gods; Superman; Jimmy Olsen

Creative team
- Written by: Jim Starlin
- Artist: Jim Starlin
- Penciller: Jim Starlin
- Inker(s): Matt Banning, Mark McKenna, Art Thibert
- Colorist: Jeromy Cox

Collected editions
- Hardcover: ISBN 1-4012-1839-3

Death of the New Gods is an eight-issue comic book limited series published in 2007 and 2008 by DC Comics. It was written and pencilled by Jim Starlin.

The series follows the final days of the New Gods as they are stalked by a mysterious killer. The events of the series set the foundation for the 2008 storyline Final Crisis.

== Background ==
Death of the New Gods was conceived by DC as a series that would lead- and tie-in to Final Crisis, much like Countdown to Final Crisis. Jim Starlin said in an interview that "I sort of think of this project as putting an ending to Jack's New Gods saga. Since Kirby's initial run on the characters, others have presented them with mixed results. Looking back I'd say at least half of the past New Gods series have done more harm than good. So for me, Death of the New Gods is half honoring Jack Kirby, half mercy killing". He also commented that "they started building Countdown around Death of the New Gods because it was way ahead of everybody else. They started catching up with me, and I'm having to change my ending to adjust to what they're doing in Countdown. Up until now, I've been telling everybody I'm killing them all. One survives. And he was going to have a good death. I had to keep him around until the end".

== Plot ==
The series begins with Darkseid recalling how he first became aware of a growing crisis with the death of Willie Walker. Walker, the corporeal form of the Black Racer, is seen being killed by an unidentified figure who tears out his heart; the same fate that had met all the other New Gods who were killed. Orion, Himon, and others discover the full extent of the death toll when on screens shows the New Gods who have been killed and others who are still missing. The Forever People are shown to be missing and two of them are prime suspects as Serifan and Beautiful Dreamer are both seen leaving two of the murders. Orion blames Darkseid; Takion asks him to hold off until further information can be revealed. Mister Miracle's wife, Big Barda, is killed in their kitchen while his back is turned. The Justice League comes to investigate Barda's murder. Doctor Mid-Nite performs an autopsy which does not reveal how she was killed. Miracle contemplates using the Anti-Life Equation to bring his wife back, but stops himself. He receives an urgent summons back to New Genesis. Superman and Miracle bring Barda's body back to New Genesis. Darkseid asks DeSaad to investigate these murders by having him examine Justeen, who was also murdered. Superman and Miracle arrive on New Genesis. Orion is insulted by Superman's presence and attacks him. Metron arrives and reveals what the cause of death is to all the New Gods. Darkseid has also come to the same conclusion: their souls have been taken from them. Darkseid wonders if all his theories on the Anti-Life Equation were actually true.

While searching the Wall for clues, Takion is killed by a mysterious assailant whom he recognizes. Superman, Scott Free and Orion battle Darkseid's shadow demons, and discover that Darkseid has obtained a portion of the Anti-Life Equation, which is still not as strong as Free's full control. Stalemated, Darkseid tells the heroes that he knows what is causing the murders, but that even knowing that he will die, he sees a chance to gain advantage, though he will not reveal his plot to the three heroes.

Superman, Orion, and Mister Miracle discover that the Forever People have been murdered as well. Free resurrects the Forever People and demands that they tell him who has killed them. While each one recounts their death, Big Bear mentions that the killer was "the last person we'd expect to see". They disintegrate before they can tell Free anything clearer, claiming that they have been ordered not to reveal the secret.

In the past, Metron speaks to the glowing ball of light, which reveals itself as the Source and the cause of the death of the New Gods. Long ago, the Source was attacked by the Old Gods and split into two, light and dark. The light side recovered and brought about the Death of the Old Gods, and then attempted to recreate existence, but could only manage to make the flawed Fourth World due to its imperfection. It attempted to reunite with its darker part, but was delayed by the events of Crisis on Infinite Earths, which unified alternative realities and created an impenetrable Source Wall. The Source then orchestrated the events of Infinite Crisis and 52 to bring back the Multiverse, and freeing its dark half, which had taken the form of the Anti-Life Entity. The Source thus reveals that it is now using an agent who is its emanation to eliminate the Fourth World to bring about the Fifth World, which will be perfect. The Source agrees to Metron's request that he be allowed to witness the end of the Fourth World.

The reunited Source reveals how Miracle's beliefs were not of its doing. Miracle, feeling manipulated and betrayed by the Source, requests to be killed and he is. Disgusted at the Source's ruthless treatment of its most loyal follower, Metron demands to be killed as well and The Source grants Metron's request. The Source sends it emanation to travel to Apokolips to engage Darkseid, who has taken a serum giving him access to the power of the Anti-Life portion of the Source's emanation.

The Source's emanation, and Darkseid battle as Superman watches. Darkseid reveals that the Source's plan was to wipe out the New Gods and create the Fifth World. The Source's emanation then releases Orion's ghost to attack Darkseid, who flees. The Source's emanation merges New Genesis and Apokolips into one planet to create the Fifth World. Superman witnesses all of this and returns home.

== Miniseries lead-in issues ==
As part of the lead-in to the limited series, a number of New Gods were killed in tie-in issues: Lightray, Granny Goodness, Bernadeth, Knockout, Grayven, Bekka, and Bloody Mary.

== Reception ==
IGN gave Death of the New Gods #1 a 7.3, which corresponds to "decent", and for issue #8 a 4.8, which corresponds to "poor".

== Collected editions ==
The series has been collected into a single volume:

- Death of the New Gods (256 pages, hardcover, Titan, October 2008, ISBN 1-84576-870-1, DC, November 2008, ISBN 1-4012-1839-3, softcover, Titan, September 2009, ISBN 1-84576-871-X, DC, August 2009, ISBN 1-4012-2211-0)
