= Lashina =

- Lashina as depicted in Harley Quinn #3 (February 2001). Art by Terry Dodson.

Publication information
- Publisher: DC Comics
- First appearance: Mister Miracle #6 (January 1972)
- Created by: Jack Kirby (writer & artist)

In-story information
- Alter ego: Lashina
- Species: New God
- Place of origin: Apokolips
- Team affiliations: Female Furies; Suicide Squad
- Notable aliases: Duchess
- Abilities: Immortality; Superhuman physical attributes; Expert hand to hand combatant; Electrically charged whips; Longevity; Superhuman endurance; Immune to all earthly diseases and resistance to conventional injury

Lashina is a supervillain appearing in American comic books published by DC Comics. She is a New God from Apokolips and a member of the Female Furies who wields electrified whips.

Lashina has appeared in various media outside comics, primarily in association with the New Gods. Diane Michelle, Nika Futterman, and Meredith Salenger have voiced the character in animation.

== Publication history ==
Lashina was created by Jack Kirby, and first appeared in Mister Miracle #6 (January 1972).

== Fictional character biography ==
Lashina is raised a warrior in Granny Goodness's orphanage, and becomes the leader of the Female Furies when Big Barda leaves Apokolips. Though the Furies initially stay on Earth to aid Barda and her lover, Mister Miracle, they return to Apokolips to face punishment for betraying Darkseid. Darkseid gives Lashina leadership of the Female Furies, to the annoyance of fellow Fury Bernadeth.

During a mission to capture Glorious Godfrey, a New God who was imprisoned on Earth, Lashina is betrayed by Bernadeth as the Female Furies are escaping through a boom tube. Caught in an explosion, Lashina is sent flying into the swamp surrounding Belle Reve Penitentiary. Lashina joins the Suicide Squad, a United States government agency that uses super-powered beings to fulfill black ops missions, to rescue Slipknot, a member of the group. Quickly dubbed Duchess by the support staff due to her haughty demeanor, she becomes a critical part of the Squad and participates in almost every one of the team's missions during her time as a member. Eventually, Lashina engineers a return to Apokolips and convinces many members of the Squad to come with her. The plan ended in a battle against Apokolips forces once the group lands on the planet's surface. Multiple Squad members are killed, including Doctor Light. During the battle, Lashina confronts and kills Bernadeth. Darkseid, furious that Lashina has brought humans to Apokolips, resurrects Bernadeth and kills Lashina with his omega beams. The surviving members of the Suicide Squad are allowed to return home.

=== Seven Soldiers ===
Lashina appears in Seven Soldiers: Mister Miracle, part of Grant Morrison's Seven Soldiers maxi-series event. Within the story, Lashina and the rest of the Furies are given human form by Darkseid. She and the rest of the Furies battle Shilo Norman in an attempt to stop him in his quest to free Aurakles, the first superhero.

=== Final Crisis ===
In Final Crisis, Lashina, once again in her human form, is seen as one of the villains running the Dark Side Club, an illegal arena where spectators gamble on battles between brainwashed teen metahumans. When Rose Wilson and Miss Martian lead a rebellion against the Dark Side Club staff, Lashina attempts to flee along with the wealthy club patrons. They nearly escape, but are cut off by Static.

When the Anti-Life Equation takes effect across the globe, several superheroines and villainesses gain Darkseid's power and are transformed into the new Female Furies. Catwoman apparently becomes the new Lashina, wearing an outfit similar to hers.

=== The New 52 ===
Lashina makes her first appearance alongside Granny Goodness in issue #8 of Infinity Man and the Forever People. During the Darkseid War, Lashina and Kanto travel to Earth to hunt down the renegade Amazon Myrina Black. Later, after Darkseid is enslaved by his daughter Grail, Lashina and the other Female Furies accept an offer from Big Barda to help defeat Grail as well as to protect Barda's husband, Mister Miracle. Lashina participates in the final battle against Grail and Darkseid, which results in the pair's defeat. Lashina leaves for Apokolips with the rest of the Furies, including Barda.

=== DC Rebirth ===
After the events of the "Darkseid War" leave Apokolips without a ruler, Lashina joins Granny Goodness and several other Furies who remained loyal to Darkseid on the outskirts of the planet called the Deadlands. She later participated in the battle against Kalibak's forces, though she was defeated by her teammate Lois Lane. Lashina was imprisoned on Apokolips with Stompa, Mad Harriet, and Granny Goodness when Superman became ruler of the planet.

At some point later, Lashina and her comrades are freed from their imprisonment by Darkseid, who is slowly regaining his power on Earth. Along with the other Female Furies, Lashina is assigned to seek out mystical artifacts that would further empower Darkseid. Steve Trevor and his team of soldiers called the Oddfellows prevent Lashina and the Furies from stealing the relics, and in the ensuing battle Lashina and Mad Harriet are captured. Both Lashina and Mad Harriet refuse to answer Wonder Woman's questions about Darkseid's plans which led to Wonder Woman freeing the two Furies and attempting to battle them for answers. The battle is interrupted by Darkseid, who transports a chunk of the A.R.G.U.S. headquarters to his lair in the Amazon jungle. During the chaos, Lashina battles the soldiers of A.R.G.U.S. before fleeing when Darkseid is apparently killed by Wonder Woman.

During the escalation of the war between Apokolips and New Genesis, Lashina attends the birth of Jacob, the son of Big Barda and Mister Miracle.

Granny Goodness soon takes an interest in Harley Quinn, sending Lashina and Bernadeth to recruit the former criminal. While Lashina distracts Quinn, Bernadeth pricks her in the back with a knockout poison. The two take Quinn to Apokolips, where she joins the Female Furies.

== Powers and abilities ==
As a New Goddess, Lashina possesses superhuman continuing pertaining to strength, speed, resistance, durability and agility.

Additionally, she is nigh-immortal. As well as a skilled combatant who wields electrified bandage wraps.

Similar to other New Gods, Lashina is vulnerable to a substance called Radion. However, its effects are only potent in sustained amounts.

== Other versions ==
- Red Lash, a fusion of Lashina and Marvel Comics character Scarlet Witch, appears in Unlimited Access #4.
- An alternate universe variant of Lashina appears in Ame-Comi Girls. This version is a member of Big Barda's space pirate gang.
- Lashina appears in Sensation Comics Featuring Wonder Woman.

== In other media ==
=== Television ===
- Lashina appears in Superman: The Animated Series, voiced by Diane Michelle. This version is the leader of the Female Furies, serving directly under Granny Goodness.
- Lashina makes a non-speaking cameo appearance in the Justice League Unlimited episode "Alive!".
- Lashina appears in Batman: The Brave and the Bold, voiced by Nika Futterman. This version is a servant of Mongal and forms a relationship with Jonah Hex.
- Lashina makes a cameo appearance in the Smallville episode "Abandoned", portrayed by Jonel Earl.
- Lashina makes a non-speaking appearance in the Justice League Action episode "It'll Take a Miracle!".
- Lashina makes non-speaking cameo appearances in Young Justice.
- Lashina makes a non-speaking cameo appearance in the Kite Man: Hell Yeah! episode "Grand Reopening, Hell Yeah!".

=== Film ===
- Lashina appears in Superman/Batman: Apocalypse, voiced by Tara Strong.
- An alternate universe incarnation of Lashina makes a cameo appearance in Justice League: Gods and Monsters.
- Lashina appears in DC Super Hero Girls: Intergalactic Games, voiced by Jessica DiCicco.
- Lashina appears in Lego DC Super Hero Girls: Brain Drain, voiced by Meredith Salenger.
- Lashina, also known as Backlash, appears in Lego DC Super Hero Girls: Super-Villain High, voiced again by Meredith Salenger. This version works for Lena Luthor.

=== Video games ===
- Lashina appears in DC Universe Online, voiced by Jen Brown.
- Lashina appears as a character summon in Scribblenauts Unmasked: A DC Comics Adventure.
- Lashina appears as a support card in the mobile version of Injustice: Gods Among Us.
- Lashina appears as an unlockable playable character in Lego DC Super-Villains, voiced by Grey Griffin.

=== Merchandise ===
- Lashina received a 3.75" action figure in the DC Universe: Justice League line in 2005 as part of the "Attack From Apokolips" three-pack alongside Darkseid and Mantis.
- Lashina received a Lego figure in the DC Super Hero Girls: "Lashina's Tank" set.

=== Miscellaneous ===
Lashina appears in DC Super Hero Girls, voiced by Jessica DiCicco.
