= Stompa =

- Stompa as depicted in Sensation Comics Featuring Wonder Woman #16 (January 2016). Art by Gabriel Hardman.

Publication information
- Publisher: DC Comics
- First appearance: Mister Miracle #6 (January 1972)
- Created by: Jack Kirby (writer & artist)

In-story information
- Alter ego: Stompa
- Species: New God
- Place of origin: Apokolips
- Team affiliations: Female Furies
- Abilities: Immortality; Superhuman strength, durability and reflexes; Skilled warrior; Wields anti-matter boots

Stompa is a supervillain and goddess appearing in books published by DC Comics. Created by writer/artist Jack Kirby, the character first appeared in Mister Miracle #6 (January 1972).

Stompa is a New God from Apokolips and a member of the Female Furies who wields anti-matter boots. She has served as an adversary to Superman and several other heroes.

Stompa has appeared in various media outside comics, primarily in association with the New Gods. Diane Delano, April Stewart, and Andrea Romano have voiced the character in animation.

== Publication history ==
Stompa first appeared in Mister Miracle #6 (January 1972) and was created by Jack Kirby.

== Fictional character biography ==
Stompa was one of the most promising youths in Granny Goodness' orphanage. Because of her strength and ruthless nature, Stompa was trained to become one of the founding members of the Female Furies. Proving her loyalty to Goodness, she turns on the former leader of the Furies, Big Barda, and attacks her on Earth. When Barda returns to Apokolips, Stompa joins her in infiltrating Section Zero, which disappoints Goodness. Taking refuge on Earth, Stompa and the other Furies aid Mister Miracle in several missions and his work as a stunt performer. The Furies later return to Apokolips and are punished for their betrayal.

The Female Furies are later sent to retrieve Glorious Godfrey from Earth and come into conflict with the Suicide Squad. The group successfully retrieves Godfrey, but Bernadeth abandons Lashina and leaves her for dead. Stompa is initially indifferent to the situation between the two Furies. When Lashina brings the Suicide Squad to Apokolips, Stompa allies with her fellow New Gods. In the ensuing battle, Stompa is defeated by Big Barda. She later resurfaces with the other Furies when they are sent to capture Mister Miracle.

During a skirmish with Batman and Superman on Paradise Island, Stompa and the Furies kill Harbinger. Later, during a battle between the Furies and Big Barda and Wonder Woman, Stompa is stabbed by Barda. It was assumed she had not survived, but she recuperates and returns to serve alongside the Furies.

In Final Crisis, Stompa is among the Furies whose spirit possesses the body of one of Earth's heroes or villains. Her vessel is Giganta, called Gigantrix by her comrades. Gigantrix is defeated by Supergirl.

=== The New 52 ===
After Darkseid is enslaved by his daughter Grail, Stompa and the other Female Furies accept an offer from Big Barda to help defeat Grail and protect Barda's husband, Mister Miracle. Stompa participates in the final battle against Grail and Darkseid, which results in the pair's defeat. Stompa leaves for Apokolips with the rest of the Furies, including Barda.

=== DC Rebirth ===
After Lex Luthor claims leadership of Apokolips, Stompa joins Granny Goodness and the other Female Furies in the deadlands, awaiting Darkseid's return. She later participates in the battle against Kalibak's forces, but is defeated by Lois Lane. Stompa is imprisoned on Apokolips with Lashina, Mad Harriet, and Granny Goodness when Superman becomes ruler of the planet.

Stompa and her comrades are freed by Darkseid, who has been slowly regaining his power on Earth. Along with the other Female Furies, Stompa is assigned to seek out mystical artifacts that will further empower Darkseid. Unbeknownst to Darkseid, Giganta tells Steve Trevor the location of the remaining relics. As the Furies travel to a museum in Turkey, they are ambushed by Trevor and his strike force, the Oddfellows. Stompa escapes with Bernadeth and Gilotina, reporting their failure back to Darkseid.

== Powers and abilities ==
Stompa possesses immense strength and durability, enabling her to lift more than 70 tons and jump great distances. In addition, Stompa uses anti-matter boots that enhance the strength of her legs. She can create earthquakes or tremors by stomping onto the ground.

== Other versions ==
=== Amalgam ===
Blobba, a fusion of Stompa and Marvel Comics character Blob, appears in Unlimited Access #4.

=== Ame-Comi Girls ===
An alternate universe version of Stompa appears in Ame-Comi Girls. This version is a member of Big Barda's space pirate gang.

=== Sensation Comics Featuring Wonder Woman ===
Stompa appears in Sensation Comics Featuring Wonder Woman.

=== Scooby-Doo! Team-Up ===
Stompa appears in Scooby-Doo! Team Up.

=== DC X Sonic the Hedgehog ===
Stompa appears in DC X Sonic the Hedgehog #4.

== In other media ==
=== Television ===
- Stompa appears in Superman: The Animated Series, voiced by Diane Delano.
- Stompa makes a non-speaking cameo appearance in the Justice League Unlimited episode "Alive!".
- Stompa appears in the Batman: The Brave and the Bold episode "Duel of the Double Crossers!" as a member of Mongal's Female Furies.

=== Film ===
- Stompa appears in Superman/Batman: Apocalypse, voiced by Andrea Romano.
- Stompa appears in DC Super Hero Girls: Intergalactic Games, voiced by April Stewart.

=== Video games ===
- Stompa appears in DC Universe Online.
- Stompa appears as a character summon in Scribblenauts Unmasked: A DC Comics Adventure.
- Stompa appears as an unlockable playable character in Lego DC Super-Villains, voiced again by Diane Delano. This version is the leader of the Female Furies.

=== Books ===
- Stompa appears in The Man of Steel: Superman and the Man of Gold, written by Paul Weissburg and published by Capstone as part of their DC Super Heroes line of illustrated children's books.
- Stompa appears in The Dark Side of Apokolips, written by Laurie S. Sutton and published by Capstone.

=== Miscellaneous ===
Stompa appears in DC Super Hero Girls, voiced by April Stewart. This version speaks in an illeism.
