= Virman Vundabar =

Publication information
- Publisher: DC Comics
- First appearance: Mister Miracle #5 (December 1971)
- Created by: Jack Kirby

In-story information
- Alter ego: Virman Vundabar
- Species: New God
- Place of origin: Apokolips
- Team affiliations: Darkseid's Elite
- Notable aliases: Baron Vermin
- Abilities: Immortality; Hand to hand combatant; Expert strategist; Ingenious scientist

Virman Vundabar is an extraterrestrial supervillain published by DC Comics.

== Publication history ==
Virman Vundabar was created by Jack Kirby and first appeared in Mister Miracle #5 (December 1971). His physical appearance is modeled after Benito Mussolini.

The name "Vundabar" is a corruption of the German word "wunderbar", which means "wonderful", and has also been spelled as "Vunderbarr". His first name "Virman" is a corruption of the word "vermin".

== Fictional character biography ==
A resident of Apokolips, Virman is a minion of Granny Goodness (and by extension Darkseid), having grown up in Goodness' orphanages like many of Darkseid's soldiers. He models his personality and schemes on Prussian military appearance and precision, having become enamored with Prussian history after a campaign on Earth.

When Darkseid is missing at the Source Wall, his inner circle turn to conspire against each other. Vundabar allies himself with Granny Goodness. DeSaad, disguised as Darkseid, makes Darkseid's circle stand down. After returning from the Source, Darkseid obliterates Vundabar with his Omega Beams. Darkseid later resurrects Vundabar, who is seemingly loyal to him despite the skepticism of Granny Goodness.

In Terror Titans, Virman Vundabar is killed by the Clock King, with his niece Malice joining the Female Furies.

In Tom King's Mister Miracle series, Vundabar appears as part of a hallucination Mister Miracle suffers after being exposed to the Anti-Life Equation.

== Powers and abilities ==
As a New God, Virman Vundabar is nigh-immortal and possesses superhuman physical abilities. He is also a skilled combatant, strategist, and scientist.

== Other versions ==
An alternate universe variant of Virman Vundabar appears in Kingdom Come.

== In other media ==
=== Television ===
- Virman Vundabar appears in Justice League Unlimited, voiced by Arte Johnson.
- Virman Vundabar makes a non-speaking appearance in the Batman: The Brave and the Bold episode "Darkseid Descending!".
- Virman Vundabar appears in the Justice League Action episode "Under a Red Sun", voiced by William Salyers.

=== Video games ===
- Virman Vundabar appears as a character summon in Scribblenauts Unmasked: A DC Comics Adventure.
- Virman Vundabar appears as a playable character in Lego DC Super-Villains, voiced by Corey Burton.

=== Miscellaneous ===
- Virman Vundabar appears in DC X Sonic the Hedgehog.
- The indie rock band Vundabar was named after the character.
