= Manga Khan =

- Manga Khan and L-Ron as depicted in Who's Who: The Definitive Directory of the DC Universe #3 (October 1990). Art by Joe Phillips (penciller/inker) and Anthony Tollin (colorist).

Publication information
- Publisher: DC Comics
- First appearance: Justice League International #14 (June 1988)
- Created by: Keith Giffen; J.M. DeMatteis; Steve Leialoha

In-story information
- Alter ego: Unknown
- Team affiliations: The Cluster
- Abilities: Alien being which exists in a gaseous state possessing telepathic abilities.

Manga Khan, originally known as Lord Manga, is a DC Comics supervillain and an intergalactic trader. A gaseous being, he relies on a metallic suit to give him form. He had a robot companion named L-Ron (before trading him to the Justice League), and was a foe of the Justice League International in the early 1990s.

== Fictional character biography ==
In one of his first encounters with the Justice League, Manga kidnaps Mister Miracle to open trade relations with Apokolips. He is followed in a spaceship by Big Barda, G'nort, Rocket Red, and Martian Manhunter. Teamwork allows them to find Khan, which enrages him to the point of damaging L-Ron. His robotic assistant is not too concerned, he then ponders what the 'fall line' of robotic forms look like.

After this situation, Manga Khan becomes a more helpful person, befriending the Justice League. He takes Despero off their hands after the Martian Manhunter devolves him. This trade ends with L-Ron being in the employ of the League, which would last for some time. After inadvertently being transferred into Despero's body, L-Ron becomes a member of the Justice League.

In Justice League Europe #28, Manga takes the defeated villain Starro. Despero however escapes, but Khan hires Lobo to retrieve him. Lobo comes to believe that Khan's way of speaking has started to affect him: Khan suffers from a condition which causes him to soliloquy at random intervals. In the same vein, he founds the Manga Khan School of Melodrama to teach similar speech patterns to other characters. One of his alumni is the Scarlet Skier.

Khan later works with Mister Miracle as part of a scheme to market soap all across the galaxy. At first it gets the two into trouble with Lobo. Khan suffers damage to his robotic shell but later recovers. Later, Khan and Miracle attempt to market the soap to the denizens of Apokolips. Not only does this product clean anything material, it cleans souls as well. The revolution they cause is stopped by Darkseid.

== Powers and abilities ==
In his natural gaseous state, Manga Khan can communicate telepathically but cannot physically interact with anything. He normally wears armor that makes him impervious to damage and grants him superhuman strength. Furthermore, Khan is a skilled negotiator and barterer.
