= Female Furies =

Group of fictional women from DC Comics

Publication information
- Publisher: DC Comics
- First appearance: Mister Miracle #6 (February 1972)
- Created by: Jack Kirby (writer & artist)

In-story information
- Member(s): Bernadeth; Gilotina; Lashina; Mad Harriet; Stompa; Malice Vundabar Former members: Big Barda; Knockout

The Female Furies are a group of women warriors and supervillains appearing in comics published by DC Comics. All of them are New Gods who serve Darkseid. They operate directly under Granny Goodness, who trains all of Darkseid's soldiers.

== Publication history ==
The Female Furies first appeared in Mister Miracle #6 (February 1972) and were created by Jack Kirby.

In November 2018, the Female Furies headlined their own six-issue miniseries by writer Cecil Castellucci and artist Adriana Melo.

== Fictional team history ==
The Female Furies are New Gods fanatically loyal to Darkseid. They have been trained by Granny Goodness to serve as Apokolips's elite strike force. Infighting among the Furies is commonplace, most typically to appoint a leader to the group.

After former Female Furies leader Big Barda defects to Earth to be with her lover Mister Miracle, Darkseid gives a kill order on the pair, prompting the rest of the Female Furies to strike. First, Mad Harriet and Stompa ambush Barda. Shortly after, Barda attacks Lashina before she can attack, though Lashina escapes from Barda. Having failed to kill either Barda or Mister Miracle, the Furies return to Apokolips.

Barda returns to Apokolips and recruits the Female Furies to help her rescue the captured Mister Miracle. The Furies ambush Granny Goodness, who had been holding a viewing party for Mister Miracle's trial by combat with a creature called the Lump. Barda nearly kills Granny until she learns that Mister Miracle had survived. Barda and Mister Miracle, along with Bernadeth, Lashina, Stompa, and Mad Harriet, return to Earth.

After some time of working with Big Barda, the Female Furies return to Apokolips, where they are assigned to command a unit of automated battle machines as punishment for their defection. The Female Furies eventually regain the trust of Darkseid, who assigns them to retrieve Glorious Godfrey from prison on Earth. As the Furies open a Boom Tube to return to Apokolips, Bernadeth betrays Lashina, leaving her for dead on Earth.

Lashina enlists several members of the Suicide Squad to help her return to Apokolips. Bernadeth waits until Lashina had exhausted herself battling others, then attacks. Lashina kills Bernadeth and is welcomed back into the Furies. The Forever People arrive, allowing Big Barda and the other captives to fight back, though the battle ends when Darkseid appears. Enraged that Lashina had brought humans to Apokolips, Darkseid resurrects Bernadeth and kills Lashina.

In the series Death of the New Gods, the Female Furies and most of the New Gods are killed by Infinity-Man. In Final Crisis, the corrupted Mary Marvel releases the Anti-Life Equation and creates new Female Furies from Earth's heroines and villainesses, including Wonder Woman, Catwoman, Giganta, and Batwoman.

=== The New 52 ===
In 2011, The New 52 rebooted the continuity of the DC universe and introduced a new Fury named Sweet Leilani. Granny Goodness sent Leilani to Earth to retrieve a Mother Box. She discovered that it was in the new O.M.A.C.'s possession. After a battle, Leilani was defeated and quickly retreated, vowing to return with the other Female Furies. Under unknown circumstances, Sweet Leilani left Darkseid's employ along with teammates Enchanthrax, Killsandra, and Thumpa, and formed the Femmes Fatales. Together, they joined the Cult of Yuga Khan. The cult's leader, Aagog, sends the Femmes Fatales to Earth to capture Beautiful Dreamer of the Forever People in hopes of resurrecting Yuga Khan. However, they are fended off by the Forever People.

Barda returns to Apokolips and made a pact with the Furies: Barda would return to the group if they helped her defeat Grail and protect Mr. Miracle. While Grail and Darkseid were about to defeat Wonder Woman, Mr. Miracle, and the other heroes, Barda and her allies arrive through a Boom Tube. Working together with the heroes, the Furies defeat Grail and separate Darkseid from the Anti-Life Equation.

=== DC Rebirth ===
After the events of the "Darkseid War" storyline that led to "DC Rebirth", Lex Luthor became ruler of Apokolips. Granny Goodness, along with the Furies, remain loyal to Darkseid and await his return. A Mother Box later mysteriously teleports Lois Lane to Apokolips. Granny, along with Lashina, Stompa, and Mad Harriet, as well as several other unnamed Furies, take Lois captive. However, after being ambushed by a Dredge Worm, Lois manages to win over the Furies by aiding them in battle. When Lois Lane jumps to Superman's defense, the Furies turn on her, claiming that by caring for a man she was belittling the progress that the Furies had made.

The Furies attend the birth of Mister Miracle's and Big Barda's child Jacob. Bernadeth allows Mister Miracle to borrow her Fahren-Knife to cut the newborn free from Barda's indestructible umbilical cord. Months later, Bernadeth attends a conference to discuss peace between Apokolips and New Genesis.

== Membership ==
=== Core members ===
Member	First appearance	Description
Bernadeth	Mister Miracle #6 (February 1972)	Bernadeth is one of the original members of the Female Furies and the younger sister of DeSaad. Bernadeth often exchanges leadership of the Furies with Lashina at Darkseid's behest. Her weapon of choice is the "Fahren-Knife", a dagger forged from the bones of Darkseid that can burn others from the inside.
Big Barda	Mister Miracle #4 (October 1971)	Big Barda is the original leader of the Female Furies who had defected to Earth due to her love for the superhero Mister Miracle. She often battled her former companions over the years. In The New 52, during the Darkseid War, Barda agreed to return as leader of the Female Furies in exchange for their help in defeating Grail. She possesses superhuman physical abilities such as strength, speed, agility and durability, wears battle armor and possesses a mega-rod as a weapon, is a highly skilled combatant and, like the other Furies, is immortal.
Lashina	Mister Miracle #6 (February 1972)	Lashina is one of the original members of the Female Furies and often serves as the leader of the group. She wields razor-sharp steel whips that she can charge with electricity. For a brief period of time, she served with the Suicide Squad under the code name Duchess.
Mad Harriet	Mister Miracle #6 (February 1972)	Mad Harriet is one of the original members of the Female Furies and a cackling madwoman. The most unpredictable member of the group, Harriet is fiercely loyal to Darkseid. She uses razor-sharp claws that emit a powerful energy, referred to as "Power Spikes".
Stompa	Mister Miracle #6 (February 1972)	Stompa is one of the original members of the Female Furies and a massive woman. She is the most physically powerful and durable member of the group. Stompa wears "Anti-Matter Boots", which enable her to create devastating earthquakes and tremors by stomping on the ground.

=== Later additions ===
Member	First appearance	Description
Alianna Hubbard	Mister Miracle #25 (September 1978)	The first human from Earth to be trained as a Female Fury.
Artemiz	Suicide Squad #35 (November 1989)	A huntress who wields a longbow and controls a pack of cyber-hounds. Artemiz was recruited into the Female Furies by Granny Goodness after Lashina was presumed dead. She has since appeared infrequently alongside the other Furies.
Aurelie	Mister Miracle #9 (June 1972)	A Female Fury who joined Himon from New Genesis. She wished to dance, which a crime on Apokolips. Barda and the Furies later discovered Aurelie's whereabouts and returned her to Apokolips.
Batwoman	52 #7 (August 2006)	One of the brainwashed heroes of Earth who served Darkseid in Final Crisis.
Bloody Mary	Hawk and Dove (vol. 3) #21 (February 1991)	An energy vampire and part of the Junior Female Furies. She has hypnotic abilities in addition to her ability to absorb life energy from her victims.
Catwoman	Batman #1 (June 1940)	One of the many brainwashed villains who served Darkseid in Final Crisis.
Gigantrix	Wonder Woman #9 (Summer 1944)	One of the many brainwashed villains who served Darkseid in Final Crisis.
Gilotina	Mister Miracle #8 (May 1972)	One of the Junior Female Furies, though she was first seen long before the Junior Furies were formed. Gilotina has the ability to slice through any material (usually with a karate chop). In later stories, she is seen wielding a pair of swords.
Hammer Harleen	Batman: Harley Quinn #1 (October 1999)	The former lover and partner of the Joker. She was recruited into the Female Furies by Granny Goodness to capture escaped prisoner Petite Tina.
Kara Zor-El	Action Comics #252 (May 1959)	She was briefly brainwashed by Darkseid into serving as the leader of his Female Furies.
Knockout	Superboy (vol. 4) #1 (February 1994)	A former member of the Female Furies who, similar to Big Barda, escaped from Apokolips and decided to live on Earth. She later became a member of the Secret Six.
Lois Lane	Action Comics #1 (June 1938)	A reporter for the Daily Planet and main love interest of Superman. She was invited by Granny Goodness to join the Female Furies after she proved herself in battle against a gigantic Dredge Worm.
Maelstrom	Superman/Supergirl: Maelstrom #1 (November 2008)	A Female Fury with delusions of becoming Darkseid's bride if she kills Superman. Repulsed, Darkseid has her tortured and banished from Apokolips after she inevitably fails.
Malice Vundabar	Hawk and Dove (vol. 3) #21 (February 1991)	The niece of Virman Vundabar, who has the appearance of a young, innocent girl. Her appearance is a deception, as she is actually a vicious member of the Junior Female Furies. While she rarely battles herself, she has the standard superhuman strength, speed, and durability of a New God. Malice is typically accompanied by Chessure, her pet Shadow Demon.
Petite Tina	Harley Quinn (vol. 3) #45 (September 2018)	A former Female Fury who rebelled against Apokolips and formed a resistance. Harley Quinn, as the Female Fury Hammer Harleen, befriended Petite Tina during her time on the planet.
Speed Queen	Hawk and Dove (vol. 3) #21 (February 1991)	A member of the Junior Female Furies. She wears roller skates that enable her to move at high speeds.
Twilight's Mother	Supergirl (vol. 4) #27 (December 1998)	Her name unknown, Twilight's mother escaped from Apokolips and left her daughter to be raised on Earth.
Wonder Woman	All Star Comics #8 (October 1941)	Wonder Woman was brainwashed by the Anti-Life Equation in Final Crisis, becoming the leader of the Female Furies.
Wunda	Seven Soldiers: Mister Miracle #1 (November 2005)	A dark-skinned Female Fury with light-based powers.

=== Femmes Fatales ===
An offshoot of the Female Furies, these four women defected and joined the Cult of Yuga Khan. They were later retrieved by Granny Goodness and presumably returned to the Furies' ranks.

Member	First appearance	Description
Enchanthrax	Infinity Man and the Forever People #7 (March 2015)	Enchanthrax is the most powerful member of the Femmes Fatales. She has the ability to paralyze and even kill people with a single touch.
Killsandra	Infinity Man and the Forever People #7 (March 2015)	A fearsome warrior who wields an asymmetrical trident and a sharp, spiked shield.
Sweet Leilani	OMAC (vol. 4) #5 (March 2012)	The leader of the Femmes Fatales. She shares many similarities with Lashina, which is presumably why she has a deep hatred for her former leader.
Thumpa	Infinity Man and the Forever People #7 (March 2015)	A muscular woman who wields a large hammer. She shares many similarities with Stompa.

== Other versions ==
- An alternate universe iteration of the Female Furies appears in the Amalgam Comics series Unlimited Access, consisting of Bernadeth, Mad Harriet, Red Lash (a composite character based on Lashina and Marvel Comics character Scarlet Witch), and Blobba (a composite character based on Stompa and Marvel Comics character Blob).
- An alternate universe iteration of the Female Furies appears in Flashpoint, led by Wonder Woman and consisting of Arrowette, Cheetah, Cheshire, Giganta, Hawkgirl, Huntress, Katana, Lady Vic, Silver Swan, Starfire, Terra, and Vixen.
- An alternate universe iteration of the Female Furies appears in Ame-Comi Girls, led by Big Barda and consisting of Stompa, Mad Harriet, Lashina, Bloody Mary, and Speed Queen.
- An alternate universe iteration of the Female Furies appears in Sensation Comics Featuring Wonder Woman, consisting of Lashina, Stompa, Mad Harriet, and Bernadeth.
- The Female Furies appear in Scooby-Doo! Team-Up, consisting of Bernadeth, Lashina, Stompa, and Mad Harriet.
- The Female Furies appear in DC X Sonic the Hedgehog, consisting of Stompa, Mad Harriet, and Lashina.

== In other media ==
=== Television ===
- The Female Furies appear in Superman: The Animated Series, consisting of Lashina, Stompa, and Mad Harriet (voiced by Andrea Martin).
- The Female Furies appear in the Justice League Unlimited episode "Alive!", consisting of Bernadeth, Lashina, Stompa, and Mad Harriet.
- The Female Furies appear in the Batman: The Brave and the Bold episode "Duel of the Double Crossers!", consisting of Lashina and Stompa.
- The Female Furies appear in the Smallville episode "Abandoned", with Mad Harriet (portrayed by Lindsay Hartley) as a prominent member while Lashina makes a cameo appearance. Granny Goodness formed this version of the group by running an orphanage to brainwash young girls into becoming her Furies.
- The Female Furies appear in Justice League Action, consisting of Bernadeth and Lashina.
- The Female Furies appear in Young Justice, initially consisting of Big Barda, Lashina, and Gilotina, with Black Mary and Supergirl joining in the series finale.
- Malice Vundabar and Chessure appear in Kite Man: Hell Yeah!, voiced by Natasia Demetriou and Dee Bradley Baker respectively. This version of the former is Darkseid's goddaughter who later comes to work at Noonan's bar as their social media manager while Chessure resembles a cat.

=== Film ===
- The Female Furies appear in Superman/Batman: Apocalypse, consisting of Gilotina, Mad Harriet, Lashina, and Stompa. Additionally, Big Barda appears as a former member of the Furies.
- The Furies appear in films set in the DC Animated Movie Universe (DCAMU):
  - Former member Knockout appears in Suicide Squad: Hell to Pay.
  - Brainwashed, cybernetically-enhanced members Wonder Woman, Mera, Hawkman, Starfire, and Martian Manhunter appear in Justice League Dark: Apokolips War.

=== Video games ===
- The Female Furies appear in DC Universe Online, consisting of Big Barda, Lashina, Stompa, and Mad Harriet.
- The Female Furies appear as character summons in Scribblenauts Unmasked: A DC Comics Adventure, consisting of Big Barda, Bernadeth, Lashina, Stompa, Mad Harriet, Artemiz, Gilotina, Speed Queen, Bloody Mary, Knockout, and Wunda.
- The Female Furies appear in Lego DC Super-Villains, led by Stompa and consisting of Lashina and Mad Harriet (voiced by Cree Summer).

=== Miscellaneous ===
- The Female Furies appear in the novel The Dark Side of Apokolips, consisting of Lashina, Stompa, Mad Harriet, Bernadeth, Artemiz, and Gilotina.
- The Female Furies appear in DC Super Hero Girls and its tie-in films, consisting of Stompa, Mad Harriet (voiced by Misty Lee), Artemiz (voiced by Teala Dunn), Lashina, and Speed Queen (voiced by Mae Whitman in her first appearance and Ashlyn Selich in her second). Additionally, Big Barda appears as a member before eventually leaving the group.
