= Orion (character) =

Fictional character in the DC Comics universe

- Cover of Jack Kirby's New Gods (1998, DC Comics). Art by Jack Kirby.

Publication information
- Publisher: DC Comics
- First appearance: New Gods #1 (February 1971)
- Created by: Jack Kirby (writer/artist)

In-story information
- Alter ego: Orion
- Species: New God
- Place of origin: New Genesis, formerly Apokolips
- Team affiliations: New Gods; Justice League; Justice League International; Justice League Odyssey
- Notable aliases: O'Ryan; Highson; Okkult
- Abilities: Immortality; Superhuman strength, speed, invulnerability and endurance; Accelerated healing; Master combatant; The Astro Force (channeled through the Astro-Harness)

Orion is a fictional superhero appearing in comic books published by DC Comics. He is the son of Darkseid and half-brother of Kalibak and Grayven who was traded to Highfather as part of a peace deal between Apokolips and New Genesis. Since then, Orion has assisted the New Gods of New Genesis against his father and was also a member of the Justice League.

Orion has appeared in various media outside comics, primarily in association with the New Gods. Steve Sandor, Ron Perlman, and Benjamin Diskin have voiced the character in animation.

== Publication history ==
Orion first appeared in New Gods #1 (February 1971), and was created by writer/artist Jack Kirby.

=== Jack Kirby era ===
Orion originally appeared in New Gods #1 (February–March 1971) which was part of Jack Kirby's Fourth World titles published in the early 1970s. Other titles included in this metaseries were Superman's Pal Jimmy Olsen, Mister Miracle, and The Forever People. When the titles were canceled, Orion and his fellow New Gods characters were unseen until DC returned to the Fourth World concept a few years later.

=== Return of the New Gods ===
Following an appearance in the final issue of 1st Issue Special, DC revived both the New Gods and Mister Miracle series, continuing the numbering from the original series. The new stories were done without Jack Kirby and featured a number of changes of concept for the character of Orion. The character's "Astro Harness" and trademark helmet were replaced by a more standard superhero costume with a yellow mask. The New Gods title was again canceled in 1978 but the story was wrapped up in two issues of Adventure Comics featuring a "final battle" between Orion and his father, Darkseid. In this battle, Darkseid was supposedly annihilated.

This version of Orion returned in a three-issue arc of Justice League of America in which most of the New Gods were captured by the forces of Apokolips. Orion and his fellow New Gods, Metron, Mister Miracle, and Big Barda, summoned the aid of the Justice League and Justice Society to aid them in freeing the forces of New Genesis. This story featured the return, and eventual defeat, of Darkseid.

=== Post-Crisis ===
Following Crisis on Infinite Earths, Orion was featured in the 1989–1990 series New Gods vol. 3 and served a short stint in the Justice League with his friend Lightray during the Keith Giffen/J. M. DeMatteis run. Orion returned as a main character in New Gods vol. 4, which was later relaunched as Jack Kirby's Fourth World. Orion again served as a member of the Justice League during Grant Morrison's tenure on the title, but the character would not receive his own title until 2000.

=== Orion ===
Orion was a series penciled and written by Walt Simonson, centered around the eponymous character and which ran for 25 issues (June 2000–June 2002). John Byrne filled in as penciller for the main stories in issues 13 and 14. Issues #1–5 were reprinted by DC Comics in the trade paperback The Gates of Apokolips. Also included as reprints were portions from the Secret Origins of Super-Villains 80-Page Giant #1 and the Legends of the DC Universe 80-Page Giant #2.

A backup that ran consistently in the Orion book was "Tales of the New Gods". Simonson invited fellow artists and writers to provide a short story often supplementing the issue's main action.

== Fictional character biography ==
Cover for Orion #1 (June 2000), art by Walt Simonson.

Orion is the second son of Darkseid, the dictator of Apokolips, and half-brother of Kalibak and Grayven. He later marries Bekka, the daughter of Apokolips resistance leader Himon. As a child, Orion was traded to New Genesis' benevolent leader Highfather for Scott Free, Highfather's son, as part of a treaty between New Genesis and Apokolips. Raised as Highfather's son, Orion was taught to control and focus his rage, and grew to value his adoptive home and its ideals. Orion's friends among the New Gods, particularly Lightray, helped him channel his Dark Side toward the protection of New Genesis. As a result of that personal struggle, Orion's inherited traits and learned focus allowed Orion to become the most powerful warrior and hero of New Genesis. His fighting skill, stamina, relentlessness, and ruthlessness have earned him the nickname "The Dog of War", who still occasionally needs the aid of his Mother Box to help control his emotions when they threaten to get the better of him. Orion counts among his closest friends Lightray, Metron, Jezebelle, Scott Free, Big Barda, and Forager.

The 25–issue Walt Simonson series was designed to follow the continuity of the original Fourth World series and was published after John Byrne's Jack Kirby's Fourth World series ended. To flesh out the series, characters such as Fourth World stalwarts Lightray, Darkseid, DeSaad, and Kalibak were used in addition to lesser used characters such as Orion's mother Tigra, Mortalla, and the Newsgroup Legion (an update of Jack Kirby's 1940s Newsboy Legion). A collection of Simonson's Orion stories was released in July 2018.

During Simonson's series, Orion obtained the Anti-Life Equation, a mathematical equation that can eliminate free will. Darkseid has coveted the Equation for eons to take control of the multiverse. Orion's mother lied to him about Darkseid not being his father. He then went to Apokolips and confronted Darkseid about his parentage. They fought for control of Apokolips with Orion refusing to use the Equation as a matter of pride and his warrior's code. He defeated Darkseid and gained control of Apokolips. With the Equation, Orion went to Earth to begin creating intergalactic peace. He used the Equation to turn Earth into a utopian world by usurping all free will and following his guidance. The lack of free will began disrupting the balance of the multiverse as Earth is the linchpin holding it all together. It was then revealed that Darkseid, with guidance from Metron, allowed Orion to defeat him so that Darkseid could understand the potential of the Equation.

Orion kills Darkseid.

Orion has served two terms with the Justice League. He first demanded to join the League alongside his friend Lightray. They were accepted as Leaguers and stayed on until after the battle with the Evil Eye. Later, Orion and Big Barda were sent as agents of New Genesis to serve in the JLA. During his time in the League, Orion helped to defeat Starro when its actions put almost the entirety of North America to sleep and aided Green Lantern, Steel, Plastic Man, and Barda in capturing a White Martian who had regained its original memory. On one occasion, Orion and other Leaguers were abducted by the seemingly insane Adam Strange as part of a plot to defeat a telepathic race. Steel (John Henry Irons) was forced to steal Orion's Mother Box and use it as a telepathic shield; the Box couldn't do this for Orion as he was so enraged by his captivity that the Box was devoting too much energy focusing on trying to keep him calm to do anything else. Orion and Barda's central mission was to help mobilize Earth's heroes against the coming of the omnipotent, Old God tech-cosmic weapon Mageddon. Orion gave his Mother Box to Oracle for safe-keeping while he confronted Mageddon at full ferocity, channeling his inherited fury from Darkseid. Oracle used it to set up a telepathic, online network that could coordinate Earth's defending heroes as they fought to stop wars that Mageddon's mind controlling presence was inciting. Once Mageddon was defeated, Orion and Barda resigned from the Justice League.

Years later, Orion returns to Earth for his final battle with Darkseid. During the fight, Orion kills Darkseid by ripping his heart out, fulfilling the prophecy of their final battle. However, Darkseid's spirit survives the death of his body and fell back in time and space; fracturing both as he fell toward his own personal Hell inside a black hole at the center of creation. As Darkseid fell, his essence was briefly reborn on Earth as Boss Dark Side. Darkseid's Elite had been killed as well and their essences possessed human bodies as well. Using the super-villain Libra, Darkseid unleashes the Anti-Life Equation onto humanity and in the process, drags Earth outside time and space, threatening the multiverse. From this point, Darkseid sought his revenge against Orion by firing a time travel-based gun backwards in time to kill Orion once and for all. The bullet mortally wounds Orion, who realizes that Darkseid and the New Gods of Apokolips are alive and using humans as host bodies. With his last strength, Orion warns the man who finds his dying body, Detective Dan Turpin, that "They are not dead - He is in you all".

Darkseid's murder of his son would ultimately backfire on him. Green Lantern John Stewart recovers the bullet that was used to kill Orion and gives it to Batman, who uses it to kill Darkseid.

=== The New 52 ===
In The New 52, a 2011 reboot of the DC Comics universe, Orion appears as a supporting character in the Wonder Woman title. After consulting with the Source, he first joins Wonder Woman in her search for a child who was abducted by the gods of Olympia.

=== New Justice ===
Orion also appears in the Justice League Odyssey series, rescuing the Green Lantern Jessica Cruz after Darkseid kills her. Initially, he is under the guise of Okkult until the ruse is discovered and he continues to appear as Orion.

== Powers and abilities ==
Orion belongs to an extraterrestrial race of supernatural immortals known as the New Gods. As a New God, he possesses the standard superhuman attributes of strength, speed, stamina and durability on par with his father Darkseid as well as with Superman; being virtually indestructible, able to run at supersonic speeds up to orbital speed, and lift weights exceeding 100 tons. Although he is a highly skilled warrior, noted for a fierce warrior's instinct, his great rage and inner turmoil makes him impulsive and prone to violent, almost psychotic outbursts as he has inherited much of his father's darkness. He has access to a Mother Box that can calm his temper and change his appearance, "smoothing" out his coarse features. In addition, Orion possesses a regenerative healing factor, and is able to call upon his Mother Box to assist in healing injuries or to sustain his life energies. Like all other New Gods, Orion is vulnerable to a substance called Radion. The "Astro-Harness" is an alien artifact of unknown origin, capable of self-repair; flight at light speed; interstellar teleportation; energy projection and absorption; force field generation; and possesses a tractor beam. Orion's wristbands are virtually indestructible.

Orion is able to harness an interdimensional energy called the "Astro Force". While Orion himself is a conduit for the Astro Force, he can use either the Astro Harness or his Astro Wristbands as a valve through which he can project this energy. He uses the Astro Force primarily as a weapon, but once he was shown to be able to use the Astro Force to create an energy shield powerful enough to deflect Darkseid's otherwise unstoppable "Omega Effect". Like his father and all members of the Fourth World, Orion is immortal.

== Other versions ==
Orion takes his father's place as the Lord of Apokolips in Kingdom Come. Art by Alex Ross.

- An alternate universe version of Orion who overthrew Darkseid as the ruler of Apokolips appears in Kingdom Come.
- Thorion, a fusion of Orion and Marvel Comics character Thor, appears in the Amalgam Comics universe.
- Orihound, an alternate universe funny animal version of Orion, appears in Captain Carrot and the Final Ark.
- An alternate universe version of Orion appears in Tangent Comics. This version is an evil sorcerer and ally of Superman.
- Ngozi Ukazu's young adult graphic novel adaptation, Orion, is set to be published in 2026.

== In other media ==
=== Television ===
Orion as depicted in Superman: The Animated Series.

- Orion appears in series set in the DC Animated Universe (DCAU):
  - He first appears in the Superman: The Animated Series two-part episode "Apokolips...Now!", voiced by Steve Sandor. He arrives on Earth to warn Superman of Darkseid's impending invasion and helps him thwart it before telling Darkseid that Earth is under Highfather's protection and any attack will be considered a breach of the peace treaty between Apokolips and New Genesis.
  - Orion appears in Justice League, voiced by Ron Perlman. In his most notable appearance in the two-part episode "Twilight", he assists the Justice League after Darkseid forms an alliance with Brainiac.
  - Orion appears in Justice League Unlimited, voiced again by Ron Perlman. As of this series, he has joined the Justice League.
- A plush toy of Orion appears in the Teen Titans Go! episode "Robin Backwards".
- Orion appears in Young Justice, voiced by Benjamin Diskin. This version is claustrophobic and has poor social skills.

=== Film ===
An alternate universe version of Orion appears in flashbacks depicted in Justice League: Gods and Monsters, voiced by Josh Keaton. This version grew up as royalty on Apokolips and was to be married to Bekka of New Genesis as part of a peace treaty between their planets. Before the ceremony, he gives her an indestructible sword and Mother Box as a wedding gift. However, he and his family are killed by Highfather, which inspires Bekka to leave and eventually become her universe's Wonder Woman.

=== Video games ===
- Orion appears in DC Universe Online.
- Orion appears as a character summon in Scribblenauts Unmasked: A DC Comics Adventure.
- Orion appears as a playable character in Lego Batman 3: Beyond Gotham, voiced by Nolan North.
- Orion appears as a playable character in Lego DC Super-Villains, voiced by Roger Craig Smith.
