= Grayven =

- Grayven as depicted in Green Lantern (vol. 3) #74 (June 1996). Art by Darryl Banks.

Publication information
- Publisher: DC Comics
- First appearance: Green Lantern (vol. 3) #74 (June 1996)
- Created by: Ron Marz (writer); Darryl Banks (artist)

In-story information
- Alter ego: Grayven
- Species: New God
- Place of origin: Apokolips
- Abilities: Immortality; Superhuman strength, durability & speed; Hand to hand combatant; Limited Omega Effect

Grayven is a supervillain published by DC Comics. He first appeared in Green Lantern (vol. 3) #74 (June 1996), and was created by Ron Marz and Darryl Banks, making him one of the few New Gods characters not created by Jack Kirby.

== Fictional character biography ==
Grayven is the third son of Darkseid, born of an unknown mother and apparently without his father's knowledge, younger brother to Kalibak and Orion. Grayven leads a campaign of destruction against the cosmos, destroying planets. He leads a campaign against the Darkstars, a galactic police force, killing many of their number. His campaign comes to an end on the planet Rann. He desires a zeta beam device, a product of Rannian science that provides instantaneous transportation on a grand scale. He intends to zeta beam his forces onto Apokolips, announce his presence to his father, and conquer the planet. While the Darkstars engage Grayven's army, Green Lantern Kyle Rayner battles Grayven himself. Assisted by John Stewart, Kyle tricks Grayven into using the Zeta Beam, causing him to be teleported off Rann and into Earth's core. Lacking their leader, Grayven's forces retreat.

=== Our Worlds at War ===
Grayven next appears during the "Our Worlds at War" event, as part of an alien alliance that also includes Maxima, Starfire, Adam Strange, and Darkseid. They seek to eliminate Imperiex, a cosmic entity seeking to destroy the universe. In The Adventures of Superman #595 (October 2001), Grayven is under the influence of Brainiac, a major force in the Imperiex War. He confronts Superman and Darkseid on the surface of Apokolips. He is defeated by Superman, then banished to Earth by Darkseid as punishment.

=== Death of the New Gods ===
Grayven has since appeared in Five of a Kind: Thunder/Martian Manhunter, lobotomized and nearly catatonic. Thunder and Martian Manhunter restore his mind and assist him in building a zeta beam generator meant to send the unknown scourge of the New Gods to Darkseid's throne room. This would force Darkseid and the killer to fight, with the result benefiting Grayven either way. Martian Manhunter transforms into the Black Racer, the New Gods' incarnation of Death, which prompts Grayven to use the zeta beam on himself to escape. Shortly after arriving at his destination, Grayven is found and murdered by Infinity-Man. Grayven is resurrected following The New 52 and DC Rebirth relaunches.

== Powers and abilities ==
As a New God, Grayven is nigh-immortal and possesses superhuman physical abilities. Additionally, he wields a limited form of the Omega Effect used by Darkseid.

== In other media ==
- Grayven appears in Young Justice, voiced by Dee Bradley Baker.
- Grayven appears as a character summon in Scribblenauts Unmasked: A DC Comics Adventure.
