= Big Barda =

Fictional comic book character

- Big Barda as depicted in Who's Who: The Definitive Directory of the DC Universe #2 (April 1985). Art by Jack Kirby and Greg Theakston.

Publication information
- Publisher: DC Comics
- First appearance: Mister Miracle #4 (October 1971)
- Created by: Jack Kirby (writer-artist)

In-story information
- Alter ego: Barda Free
- Species: New God
- Place of origin: Apokolips
- Team affiliations: New Gods; Justice League; Female Furies; Birds of Prey
- Abilities: Immortality; Superhuman strength, durability, reflexes, agility, stamina and speed; Master hand-to-hand combatant; Expert with various types of weaponry; Battle armor and wields a mega-rod

Big Barda is a superhero appearing in American comic books published by DC Comics. She first appeared in Mister Miracle #4 (October 1971), and was created by Jack Kirby. Barda was born on Apokolips about 250 years ago. She was taken away from her mother at an early age to be trained as a warrior at Granny Goodness' orphanage. Granny grooms Barda to lead the Female Furies. However, during a raid, Barda meets Scott Free, Darkseid's adopted son, who she falls in love with. Barda eventually left to become a hero.

Jack Kirby based Barda's physical appearance on Lainie Kazan, who had recently appeared topless in Playboy. Mark Evanier, Kirby's assistant on the Fourth World comics, has explained the genesis of the character: "Jack based some of his characters (not all) on people in his life or in the news... the characterization between Scott 'Mister Miracle' Free and Barda was based largely—though with tongue in cheek—on the interplay between Kirby and his wife Roz".

== Fictional character biography ==
Barda is a member of the race known as the New Gods, and was born on Apokolips about 250 years ago. Her mother was Big Breeda, whom Barda was taken away from at an early age to be trained as a warrior at Granny Goodness' orphanage. Granny grooms Barda to lead the Female Furies. During a raid, Barda meets Scott Free, Darkseid's adopted son, who she falls in love with.

Barda risks her own safety to work with the rebel cell led by the New God Himon after enforcer Willik kills most of Himon's cell. This includes one of Barda's people, Auralie, who is tortured to death for dancing, a crime on Apokolips. Moments later, Himon kills Willik with a bomb. Barda, the Furies, Himon and Metron help Scott escape Apokolips. Darkseid himself calls for Scott to return but does not stop him, as Scott's escape can reignite his war with New Genesis. Barda, not emotionally prepared to escape herself, stays behind. Eventually, Barda turns her back on Granny Goodness and comes to Earth. Once there, she finds that Scott has become Mister Miracle. For a while, Barda's Furies assist Scott in his showmanship efforts but they return to Apokolips by themselves. Scott and Barda are married by Scott's birth father, Highfather of New Genesis.

For a number of years, Barda follows Scott and Oberon on tour. Eventually they retire from superheroing and move to Bailey, New Hampshire. Despite their best attempts, a normal life eludes them. Disasters plague them and eventually Barda, Scott, and Oberon move to Greenwich Village. There, Barda forms a defense-training program for women called the New Female Furies.

=== Justice League ===
Though naïve regarding Earth customs, Barda relishes her roles of wife and housekeeper, but when duty calls she never hesitates to assume the posture of a warrior; and when Scott joins the Justice League, Barda participates in several missions. In one instance, while training Fire, her weapon, the Mega-Rod, is stolen. With the assistance of her husband and the Huntress, she gets it back, but not before many innocent people are killed by its wielder, who was unable to resist its influence. Barda also led a JLA mission to rescue her husband after he was lost in space. The mission was a result of Manga Khan selling Scott to Granny Goodness. Her teammates included Martian Manhunter, Rocket Red, and G'nort. In an attempt to dissuade their successful pursuit, Manga Khan hired Lobo, paying him in dolphin feed, to kill them. He almost does before Barda teleports him behind Guy Gardner.

For a time, Barda mourns Scott, believing him killed in a battle with Despero, but it was a robot double that was destroyed, as part of a plan by Khan.

After their time with the JLI, the two leave Earth for New Genesis, but, they soon return and take up temporary residence aboard the Justice League Refuge. During this period, the couple separate briefly due to Scott's lack of consideration for her feelings. Barda perishes, but is reborn via Scott's temporary access to great cosmic power.

Barda has served as a member of the JLA in her own right as well. At Takion's order, she and fellow New God Orion are sent as agents of New Genesis to serve on the team. Takion predicted that the Earth faced a grave threat. Their mission is to help mobilize Earth's heroes against the omnipotent Mageddon. Over time, they become involved with several other JLA missions. Adam Strange, needing help with an alien invasion, enslaves the JLA as part of a bluff. The League works for days, turning the planet into a giant teleportation beam. The aliens are sent off to the prison planet of Takron-Galtos, which Barda had mentioned several times during the ordeal. In another instance, Barda is badly wounded fighting Queen Bee, a member of the newly reformed Injustice League. Once Mageddon is defeated, Barda and Orion resign from the JLA.

=== After the League ===
Barda and Scott reside in the suburbs of Connecticut and are active adventurers. Barda never hesitates to lend a hand to her friends when her power and expertise are needed.

Barda accompanies Batman, Superman, and Wonder Woman to Apokolips to rescue Supergirl from Darkseid's clutches, and accepts an invitation from Oracle to become the heavy-hitter on the Birds of Prey.

A similar-looking character named Little Barda appeared as a member of the Teen Titans in 52 #21; the character leaves the group in the same issue. Her relationship to Big Barda is unknown, though she escaped from Apokolips with Power Boy.

In a confrontation with the Secret Six, Barda engages Knockout, another ex-Fury, in hand-to-hand combat. Although the fight is long and continues amid other larger concerns for her team, it ends in a draw.

Big Barda is killed in the first issue of Death of the New Gods; her funeral occurs in the second issue of the series. Infinity-Man is later revealed as the killer. He had been killing all the 'New Gods' in the name of restarting a new age of deities. In Final Crisis, Barda is among the New Gods reborn on New Genesis.

=== The New 52 and Infinite Frontier ===
Following 2011 The New 52 continuity reboot, Barda and Scott initially appear only in stories set on Earth 2. The Multiversity Guidebook explains that each Earth contains a unique manifestation of the New Gods.

The Prime Earth incarnations of Barda and Scott begin appearing in mainstream comics again from 2015 onwards. Barda is seen in the Justice League "Darkseid War" (2015–2016) storyline and the Mister Miracle (2017) limited series. Later, she supports the Justice League when Batman flooding sea waters threaten all the world's coasts. She also united alongside the global superhero community to confront Doctor Manhattan in defence of Superman. After this, she celebrated her one year marriage anniversary with Scott in DC Love is Battlefield (2021), and attended the Justice League's funeral in Dark Crisis (2022).

Later, after the events of Dark Nights: Death Metal as part of the Infinite Frontier reboot, Barda's pre-New 52 history is restored. She rejoins the Birds of Prey under Black Canary's leadership in Birds of Prey (volume 5) #1 (2023). She is given membership in the Justice League as part of the team's expanded lineup.

New Gods (vol. 5) depicts Barda accompanying Scott following his departure after an encounter with Orion, who tells him to take a prophesied child who can either bring about peace or war on New Genesis from himself before Orion can kill said child.

== Powers and abilities ==
Barda is a New God, a race of genetically enhanced beings who evolved godly abilities from their proximity to the Source. This gives Barda a level of strength roughly parallel to Wonder Woman as well as a high resistance to injury approaching invulnerability. She is similarly resistant to disease and most toxins. As a former Female Fury trained by Granny Goodness, Barda is a master combatant in swordsmanship and raw brawling, which - in conjunction with her raw strength and grit - make her an immediate match for Wonder Woman.

In combat, Barda wears Apokoliptian battle armor, which enhances her already impressive durability. In addition, Barda uses a high-tech weapon called the "Mega-Rod". It enables her to fly, generate energy, teleport, and manipulate gravity.

== Other versions ==
- Barda and Scott are seen on Earth 2 in the series Earth 2. Here, Barda secretly remained loyal to the Furies and to Darkseid. She helps prepare the Earth for Darkseid's arrival until she's defeated by Doctor Impossible (James Olsen Jr), leading Kalibak to cast her out of Darkseid's army. In the aftermath of Darkseid's invasion, she is disguised as a human when a desperate Richard Grayson begs her to take his son into her care.
- An alternate timeline version of Big Barda appears in Kingdom Come.
- "Big Bard", a gender-flipped version of Big Barda, appears in Superman/Batman #24.
- An alternate universe version of Big Barda who became a Green Lantern appears in JLA: Another Nail.
- An alternate universe version of Big Barda appears in DC Comics Bombshells. This version is a member of Amanda Waller's Bombshells project and in a relationship with Kimiyo Hoshi.
- An alternate universe version of Big Barda makes a cameo appearance in Dark Multiverse: Flashpoint. This version is the ruler of Apokolips.
- In The Dark Knight Strikes Again, former pornographic actress Hot Gates assumes the name Big Barda and declares herself dictator of Columbus, Ohio.
- Barda is the protagonist of the young adult graphic novel Barda, written and illustrated by Ngozi Ukazu and published by DC Comics in 2024.

== Reception ==
In 2011, Comics Buyer's Guide included Big Barda as #75 in a "100 Sexiest Women in Comics" list.

== In other media ==
=== Television ===
Big Barda as she appears in Superman: The Animated Series (left) and Batman Beyond (right). Both appearances were used in Justice League Unlimited.

- Big Barda appears in series set in the DC Animated Universe (DCAU), voiced by Farrah Forke.
  - Barda makes a non-speaking cameo appearance in the Superman: The Animated Series two-part episode "Apokolips...Now!" as a member of New Genesis' army.
  - Barda appears in the Batman Beyond two-part episode "The Call" as a member of the Justice League Unlimited.
  - Barda appears in the Justice League Unlimited episode "The Ties That Bind".
- Big Barda appears in Batman: The Brave and the Bold, voiced by Diane Delano.
- Big Barda appears in Justice League Action, voiced by Laura Post.
- Big Barda appears in Young Justice: Outsiders, voiced by Grey Griffin. This version is a member of the Female Furies.
- Big Barda will appear in Mister Miracle, which is set in the DC Universe (DCU), and is set to be voiced by Mackenzie Davis.

=== Film ===
- Big Barda appears in Superman/Batman: Apocalypse, voiced by Julianne Grossman. This version is the former captain of Granny Goodness' Furies and an associate of Superman, Batman, and Wonder Woman.
- An alternate universe version of Big Barda makes a non-speaking cameo appearance in a flashback in Justice League: Gods and Monsters.
- Big Barda was intended to appear in a New Gods film part of the DC Extended Universe (DCEU), with Ava DuVernay directing and Kario Salem and Tom King as writers, before Warner Bros. canceled the project.

=== Video games ===
- A statue of Big Barda appears in Injustice: Gods Among Us as part of the Hall of Justice stage.
- Big Barda appears in DC Universe Online via the "Halls of Power" trilogy DLC.
- Big Barda appears as a character summon in Scribblenauts Unmasked: A DC Comics Adventure.
- Big Barda appears as a playable character in Lego DC Super-Villains, voiced again by Diane Delano.

=== Merchandise ===
Big Barda received a figure in the DC Comics Super Hero Collection.

=== Miscellaneous ===
- Big Barda appears in DC Super Hero Girls and its tie-in films, voiced by Misty Lee. This version is a member of the Female Furies who later shows interest in attending Super Hero High.
- The DCAU incarnation of Big Barda appears in the tie-in comics Batman Beyond (vol. 2), Justice League Beyond and Superman Beyond: Man of Tomorrow.
