= New Gods (vol. 5) =

DC Comics series since 2024

- Textless variant cover of New Gods (vol. 5) #1; Art by Evan Cagle.

Publication information
- Publisher: DC Comics
- Schedule: Monthly
- Format: Ongoing
- Genre: Superhero
- Publication date: December 18, 2024 – November 19, 2025
- No. of issues: 12
- Main character(s): New Gods; Orion; Mister Miracle; Big Barda

Creative team
- Written by: Ram V
- Artist: Evan Cagle
- Colorist: Francesco Segala

New Gods (vol. 5) is an epic science fantasy comic book series written by Ram V and primarily illustrated by Evan Cagle. It began as a part of DC Comics' All In initiative following the "Absolute Power" event. It features the titular New Gods following the supposed death of Darkseid, and a prophecy regarding a child that could either bring salvation or destruction.

The comic has received critical and commercial praise for its art, characterization, and evolution of the concepts of the original Fourth World series.

== Publication ==
The series was announced at San Diego Comic Con 2024 alongside DC's Absolute Universe line of comics.

Ram V stated that his run is based on fatherhood with the theme of old and new generations, and takes influence from Hindu mythology, with gods being more nuanced in their actions and feelings.
