= Diane Delano =

American actress (1957–2024)

- Born: January 29, 1957; Los Angeles, California, U.S.
- Died: December 13, 2024 (aged 67); Sherman Oaks, California, U.S.
- Occupation: Actress
- Years active: 1977–2024
- Relatives: John Merton (grandfather)

Diane Delano (January 29, 1957 – December 13, 2024) was an American character actress. She was known for her numerous roles in films and television, such as Sergeant Barbara Semanski on the CBS television series Northern Exposure and Roberta "Bobbi" Glass on The WB television series Popular.

== Life and career ==
Delano was born in Los Angeles on January 29, 1957. She was the granddaughter of actor John Merton.

Aside from her role on Popular, she played the role of Hilda, an FBI agent hired to protect Sami Brady, on Days of Our Lives. She also had a recurring role on Northern Exposure. Delano had a substantial voice acting career, voicing Ma Vreedle in the Ben 10 franchise, Tuba in Infinity Train, Stompa in Superman: The Animated Series, and Pantha in Teen Titans, among others.

Delano died from cancer at home in Sherman Oaks, California on December 13, 2024, at the age of 67. The news of her death was made public by Delano's friend and fellow actress Stepfanie Kramer.

== Filmography ==
=== Film ===
Year	Title	Role	Notes
1983	Heart Like a Wheel	Shirley's sister	Biographical film directed by Jonathan Kaplan and based on the life of drag racing driver Shirley Muldowney.
1986	Ratboy	Aurora	Drama film directed by and starring Sondra Locke.
1988	Miracle Mile	Stewardess	Post-apocalyptic thriller film written and directed by Steve De Jarnatt.
1992	Sleepwalkers	Police	Horror film directed by Mick Garris.
1994	The River Wild	Ranger	Adventure crime-thriller film directed by Curtis Hanson.
1998	The Thin Pink Line	Sgt. Dot Jenkins	Mockumentary directed by Joe Dietl and Michael Irpino.
2000	Highway 395	Violet	Action-crime film directed by and also starring Fred Dryer.
2001	The Theory of the Leisure Class	Psychic Healer	Crime drama-Mystery film directed and co-written by Gabriel Bologna.
2002	Out of These Rooms	Claudette	Directed and written by Harri James.
2003	A Mighty Wind	Witch #2	Mockumentary comedy film directed, co-written and composed by Christopher Guest.
2003	Jeepers Creepers 2	Bus Driver Betty Borman	Horror film written and directed by Victor Salva.
2004	The Ladykillers	Mountain Girl	Black comedy thriller film directed by Joel and Ethan Coen.; The Coens' screenplay was based on the 1955 British Ealing comedy film of the same name, written by William Rose.
2006	Midnight Clear	Trudy	Drama film directed by Dallas Jenkins.
2006	The Wicker Man	Sister Beech	Horror film written and directed by Neil LaBute.; Remake of the 1973 British cult classic of the same name.
2006	Surf School	Tillie	Comedy-Sports film directed and written by Joel Silverman.
2007	Choose Connor	Lara Connor	Drama film directed by Lucas Elliot Eberl.
2010	Scooby-Doo! Abracadabra-Doo	Ms. Alma Rumblebuns	Voice, direct-to-video animated film directed by Spike Brandt and Tony Cervone.
2018	Relish	Officer Roz	
2022	Me Time	Crossing Guard Lenore	
2024	Final Heist	Nurse Gina	
2024	Road to Dreamland	Officer Roz	
2024	Paradise: A Town of Sinners and Saints	Cyndl Johnson	

=== Television ===
Year	Title	Role	Notes
1983	St. Elsewhere	Nurse	Episode: "The Count"
1986	Stark: Mirror Image	Simone Lubchansky	Television film
1987	Scarecrow and Mrs. King	Maid	Episode: "All That Glitters"
1987	L.A. Law	Rhonda Vasek	6 episodes
1988	Growing Pains	Sonya Olsen	Episode: "Fool for Love"
1988	Hunter	Getaway Driver	Episode: "Honorable Profession"
1989	Perfect Strangers	Flame	Episode: "That Old Gang of Mine"
1989	Falcon Crest	Deputy Marcia Moore	Episode: "Missing Links"
1989	Matlock	Dodo the Clown	Episode: "The Clown"
1989	Major Dad	Marty	Episode: "Jane Wayne Day"
1989	Thirtysomething	Isabel	Episode: "New Baby"
1989	Doogie Howser, M.D.	Miss McCormick	Episode: "Every Dog as His Doogie"
1990	The Great American Sex Scandal		Television film
1990	Who's the Boss?	Bev	Episode: "Micelli's Marauders"
1990	Cop Rock	Cop	Episode: "Marital Blitz"
1991	Quantum Leap	Prostitute #2	Episode: "Southern Comforts"
1991	Acting Sheriff	Deputy Judith Mahoney	TV pilot
1991–1995	Northern Exposure	Sergeant Barbara Semanski	12 episodes
1992	Rachel Gunn, R.N.	Sheriff	Episode: "The Pet Peeve"
1992	Married... with Children	Gladys	Season 7, Episode 4: "Al on the Rocks"
1992	Wild Card		Television film
1993	Bakersfield P.D.	Jessie Preston	Episode: "The Snake Charmer"
1993	Hearts Afire	Doris	Episode: "Moonlighting"
1994	Coach	Betsy	Episode: "Jailbirds"
1994	Step by Step	Cop	Episode: "Something Wild"
1995	Platypus Man	Bernice	Episode: "The Crush"
1995	Pig Sty	Freddi	Episode: "Nightmare in 15C"
1995	Unhappily Ever After	Vic	Episode: "Rocky VI"
1995	Misery Loves Company	Melanie	Episode: "Uneasy Rider"
1995–1997	Aaahh!!! Real Monsters	Dr. Sinkenclogger, Cindy, Eye Doctor	Voice, 3 episodes
1996	Renegade	Judge Crescia	Episode: "Stationary Target"
1996	Step by Step	Lady Cop	Episode: "Torn Between Two Mothers"
1997	Goode Behavior	Debbie Caruthers	Episode: "The Goode, the Bad, and the Willie"
1997	The Single Guy	Pit Boss	Episode: "Vegas Finale"
1997	Meego	Judith	Episode: "Fatal Attraction"
1997–2002	Rugrats	Sheila, Naomi	Voice, 2 episodes
1997	ER	Delores	Episode: "Fortune's Fools"
1998	Addams Family Reunion	Delores Adams	Video
1998	The Eddie Files	Betty Lou	Episode: "Ratios: The Lonesome Pine"
1998	Cow and Chicken	Tough Buffalo Gal	Voice, episode: "Buffalo Gals"
1998	The New Addams Family	Ginger	Episode: "Uncle Fester's Toupee"
1998–2000	Superman: The Animated Series	Stompa	Voice, 4 episodes
1999	Dharma & Greg	Lina	Episode: "Dharma and the Horse She Rode in On"
1999	3rd Rock from the Sun	Lorraine	Episode: "Paranoid Dick"
1999	The Sylvester & Tweety Mysteries	Cave Girl	Voice, episode: "When Granny Ruled the Earth"
1999	Silk Hope	Linda	Television film
1999	100 Deeds for Eddie McDowd	Brenda May	Episode: "All Howls Eve"
1999	Saved by the Bell: The New Class	Officer Barry	2 episodes
1999–2001	Popular	Roberta 'Bobbi' Glass	36 episodes
2000	Providence	B.J. Maximus	Episode: "The Good Doctor"
2000	The Michael Richards Show	Security Guard	Episode: "The Consultant"
2001	The Angry Beavers	Announcer, Narxa	Voice, episode: "Line Duncing"
2001	The Ellen Show	Bunny Hopstetter	6 episodes
2002	St. Sass	Ms. Fester	Television film
2002	The Brothers García	Tall Girl	Episode: "School Daze"
2002	The Division	Patti	Episode: "Brave New World"
2002	ER	Stella Willis	4 episodes
2002	The Zeta Project	Miss Berkley	Voice, episode: "Lost and Found"
2002	One on One	Officer Esther Justice	Episode: "Give Me Some Credit"
2002	Robbery Homicide Division	Nicole	Episode: "Had"
2003	A Painted House	Mrs. Spruill	Television film
2004	Six Feet Under	Teri	Episode: "Terror Starts at Home"
2004	Joan of Arcadia	Coach Carol Keady	4 episodes
2005	Quintuplets	Carmen	Episode: "The Coconut Kapow"
2005	Monk	Krystal the Trucker	Episode: "Mr. Monk Gets Stuck in Traffic"
2005	American Dragon: Jake Long	Ophelia Ogelvy	Voice, episode: "Fu Dog Takes a Walk"
2005–2006	Zoey 101	Nurse Krutcher	2 episodes
2005	Death to the Supermodels	Merle	Video
2006	Teen Titans	Pantha	Voice, 2 episodes
2006	Desperate Housewives	Donna	Episode: "Everybody Says Don't"
2006	Two and a Half Men	Prison Matron	Episode: "Golly Moses, She's a Muffin"
2006	Everwood	Mary	Episode: "The Land of Confusion"
2007	NCIS	Dee Dee Chesney	Episode: "Dead Man Walking"
2007	The War at Home	P.E. Teacher	Episode: "The Graduate"
2007	Cold Case	Maggie Lafferty	Episode: "Justice"
2008	American Dad!	Supervisor	Voice, episode: "The One That Got Away"
2008	'Til Death	Sammy	Episode: "Sob Story"
2008	Ben 10: Alien Force	DNAlien #1, Edna	Voice, episode: "Max Out"
2008	According to Jim	Mo	Episode: "Cabin Boys"
2008–2009	Days of Our Lives	Hilda Van Beno	9 episodes
2009	Batman: The Brave and the Bold	Big Barda	Voice, episode: "The Last Bat on Earth!"
2010	Crafty	Leslie Lawford	Episode: "Don't Tell Mom the Babysitter's Baked"
2010	Good Luck Charlie	Mad Dog	Episode: "Charlie Is 1"
2011	Wizards of Waverly Place	Coach Penny	Episode: "Everything's Rosie for Justin"
2011	Ben 10: Ultimate Alien	Ma Vreedle	Voice, episode: "The Mother of All Vreedles"
2012	Fred: The Show	Culinary Arts Teacher	Episode: "Flour Baby"
2012	DeVanity	Shara Rose	Episode: "Payback's a Bitch"
2012	The Middle	Police Officer	Episode: "Year of the Hecks"
2012, 2019	Young Justice	Devastation	Voice, 2 episodes
2013	Mike & Molly	Isabelle	Episode: "Molly Unleashed"
2013	Shake It Up	Nurse Barbara	Episode: "Remember It Up"
2013–2014	Ben 10: Omniverse	Ma Vreedle, Pretty Boy #1	Voice, 2 episodes
2014–2015	100 Things to Do Before High School	Coach LeBeau	7 episodes
2015	2 Broke Girls	Officer Stanley	Episode: "And the Crime Ring"
2015, 2018	K.C. Undercover	Regina Honey	2 episodes
2016	General Hospital	Margarethe	Recurring role
2016	Mom	Leslie	Episode: "Sparkling Water and Ba-dinkers"
2018	Niko and the Sword of Light	Captain Nekton	Voice, episode: "Sky Whale City"
2019	Pen15	Jan	3 episodes
2019	Good Girls	Karen	Episode: "This Land Is Your Land"
2020	AJ and the Queen	Police Officer	Episode: "Dallas"
2020	Infinity Train	Tuba	Voice, 4 episodes
2021	The Upshaws	Jan	3 episodes

=== Video games ===
Year	Title	Role	Notes
2013	Dead Rising 3	Sgt. Hilde Schmittendorf	Open world survival horror beat 'em up
2018	Lego DC Super-Villains	Granny Goodness, Big Barda, Stompa	
2019	Rage 2	Gunbarrel Civilian, Dreadwood Civilian, Treasure Hunter	
