= G'nort =

- G'nort as depicted in Green Lantern (vol. 3) #24 (May 1992). Art by Pat Broderick (pencils), Romeo Tanghal (inks), and Anthony Tollin (colors).

Publication information
- Publisher: DC Comics
- First appearance: Justice League International #10 (February 1988)
- Created by: Keith Giffen; J. M. DeMatteis

In-story information
- Alter ego: G'nort Esplanade G'neeshmacher
- Species: G'Newtian
- Place of origin: G'newt
- Team affiliations: Green Lantern Corps; Darkstars; Justice League; Justice League International
- Abilities: Power Ring, power mantle, power constructs

G'nort Esplanade G'neesmacher is a character appearing in DC Comics. He is a member of the Green Lantern Corps and later a Darkstar and a member of the Justice League Antarctica. He resembles an anthropomorphic dog. He is generally incompetent and used as comic relief.

G'nort has made limited appearances in media outside comics, with Alexander Polinsky voicing him in Batman: The Brave and the Bold.

== Publication history ==
G'nort first appeared in Justice League International #10 (February 1988), and was created by Keith Giffen and J. M. DeMatteis. His appearance and personality were modeled after Ed Norton from The Honeymooners.

== Fictional character biography ==
G'nort is from the planet G'newt. Hal Jordan explains that G'nort became a Green Lantern due to the influence of his uncle, who was a famous member of the Lantern Corps. Despite his limited intelligence and lack of tactical judgment, G'nort is consistently depicted as brave, loyal, and honorable. This fact is overlooked by most heroes, although Superman has pointed it out on occasion.

Early in his career, G'nort becomes inadvertently mixed up with the League's battle against the Manhunters. Recognizing G'nort's incompetence, the Corps gave him an uninhabited sector of space to patrol. The fact that the region was uninhabited also suited the needs of the Manhunters, who set up their home planet in G'nort's sector. G'nort joins Hal Jordan, Superman, and other Justice League members in an assault on the Manhunters.

=== Working with the Justice League ===
G'nort goes on a mission to rescue Mister Miracle from the interstellar trader Manga Khan. Traveling in a spaceship, G'nort works with Big Barda, Martian Manhunter, and Rocket Red (Dimitri Pushkin). They chase down Khan and survive an assassination attempt by his hired killer Lobo.

Both G'nort and his enemy Scarlet Skier are founding members of Justice League Antarctica, created by Maxwell Lord for the purpose of keeping both them and the reformed Injustice League out of his way. The League, including G'nort, find their Antarctic headquarters overwhelmed by killer penguins. Their enemies are ultimately destroyed, but not before the headquarters is destroyed. G'nort keeps himself and the League alive with his power ring until help arrives.

=== Qward battle ===
It is revealed that G'nort and his uncle G'newman were given their rings by the Poglachians, an alien species resembling clowns who posed as the Guardians of the Universe while the real Guardians were with the Zamarons. The Poglachians are pawns of the Weaponers of Qward, who hoped to discredit the Green Lantern Corps by having the name associated with idiots. G'nort works with Guy Gardner, ending up in Qward itself. Faced with the threat of his uncle being killed, G'nort gives up the location of Hal Jordan.

Soon after, powerless but free from a Qwardian cell, G'nort smells the soldier who took his ring and tracks him down. The soldier swiftly overpowers G'nort and makes the mistake of bragging how he would torture and kill Guy. Enraged, G'nort defeats the soldier, gains his ring and saves Guy by destroying the source of his power. The two make it back to normal space as explosions devastate the local area. Afterwards, Guy Gardner reluctantly tells the real Guardians that G'nort was the true hero on Qward, which earns G'nort status as a genuine Green Lantern. Around this time, G'nort is kicked out of the Justice League.

=== Post-League ===
G'nort loses his ring during Emerald Twilight and joins the Darkstars. He retains his Darkstar uniform long after the organization collapses, when he is captured by Manga Khan, who attempts to trade him to Maxwell Lord in exchange for L-Ron. G'nort is set free after Lord and Sue Dibny hold Khan for ransom.

G'nort is seen as the sole member of Super Buddies Antarctica, exactly where Maxwell Lord wants him. For a time, G'nort lives behind Guy Gardner's Warriors bar. He appeared later in the mini-series Guy Gardner: Collateral Damage, where his homeworld G'newt is devastated during the Rann–Thanagar War. The character is portrayed more seriously in this story, suffering heavily from the loss of his family.

In The New 52, in the final events of the 2013 "Wrath of the First Lantern" storyline, G'nort appears and helps prevent the Red Lantern Corps from attacking the Green Lantern Corps during the battle against the villainous First Lantern.

G'nort reappears in response to a distress call made by the robot inhabitants of a planet seized by Larfleeze. Their rings mutually determine that Larfleeze and G'nort are cousins, and G'nort becomes Larfleeze's sidekick.

== Other versions ==
- An alternate universe variant of G'nort appears in I Can't Believe It's Not the Justice League. This version is a rampaging flea-infested giant.
- An alternate universe variant of G'nort makes a cameo appearance in Planetary as one of several dead Green Lanterns on display in the Planetary headquarters.

== In other media ==
=== Television ===
- G'nort makes a non-speaking cameo appearance in the Duck Dodgers episode "The Green Loontern".
- G'nort appears in Batman: The Brave and the Bold, voiced by Alexander Polinsky.
- G'nort makes a non-speaking cameo appearance in the Justice League Action episode "The Fatal Fare".

=== Video games ===
G'nort appears as a character summon in Scribblenauts Unmasked: A DC Comics Adventure.

=== Miscellaneous ===
- G'nort's career is examined in Green Lantern and Philosophy.
- G'nort received a paragraph in Planet Dog: A Doglopedia.
- G'nort appears in the Justice League Unlimited tie-in comic.
- A hologram of G'nort appears in Legion of Super Heroes in the 31st Century #6.
