= Superman/Batman: Apocalypse =

2010 superhero film

- DVD cover
- Directed by: Lauren Montgomery
- Written by: Tab Murphy
- Based on: Superman/Batman: "The Supergirl from Krypton" by Jeph Loeb and Michael Turner
- Produced by: Bruce Timm; Alan Burnett; Bobbi Page; Lauren Montgomery; Sam Register; Benjamin Melniker; Michael Uslan
- Starring: Andre Braugher; Kevin Conroy; Tim Daly; Summer Glau; Edward Asner; Susan Eisenberg; Julianne Grossman
- Music by: John Paesano
- Production companies: Warner Premiere; DC Entertainment; Warner Bros. Animation; MOI Animation (animation services)
- Distributed by: Warner Home Video
- Release date: September 28, 2010
- Running time: 78 minutes
- Country: United States
- Language: English

Superman/Batman: Apocalypse is a 2010 American animated superhero film based on the Superman/Batman comic book storyline "The Supergirl from Krypton" and is a standalone sequel to Superman/Batman: Public Enemies (2009). The art style is partly based on that of Michael Turner, who penciled the Superman/Batman comic book arc. Directed by Lauren Montgomery, it is the ninth film of the DC Universe Animated Original Movies. The film stars Andre Braugher, Kevin Conroy, Tim Daly, and Summer Glau. Despite the title, the film focuses primarily on Supergirl and Superman, with Batman playing a supporting role.

The film was released on September 28, 2010, by Warner Premiere and Warner Bros. Animation. The two-disc special edition and Blu-ray also includes an animated short featuring Green Arrow.

== Plot ==
Weeks after the events that led to Lex Luthor's arrest, the impeachment of his presidency, and Superman and Batman's success in saving the world from a kryptonite meteor, (Note: As depicted in Superman/Batman: Public Enemies (2009)) a spaceship crash-lands in Gotham City Harbor, from which a young girl emerges. She inadvertently wreaks havoc with her powers until Superman arrives to correct the damage, allowing Batman to eventually expose her to Kryptonite which weakens and injures her mentally.

With Superman's help, they discover the girl is Kara Zor-El, Superman's cousin, who has been in suspended animation for decades. While Superman welcomes Kara, teaches her English, and helps her adjust to Earth society, Batman remains suspicious, even considering the possibility of Kara being an enemy. Tipped off by Batman, Wonder Woman and Lyla ambush Kara and Clark Kent, Superman's alter ego, in a park and suggest they train Kara at Themyscira. Superman reluctantly agrees, but Batman and Wonder Woman advise Superman to steer clear of Kara, criticizing his care of her.

On the desolate planet Apokolips, Darkseid learns of Kara's presence on Earth and orders Granny Goodness to have her brought to Apokolips as a possible leader for the Female Furies. Two months later, Batman and Superman are checking on Kara on Themyscira during a sparring match against Artemis. When Kara and Lyla sneak away for a swim, a horde of Doomsday clones arrives from Apokolips. Superman, Batman, Wonder Woman, and the Amazons fight them until Superman vaporizes them with his heat vision. Batman, however, discovers Kara missing and Lyla dead, with Darkseid ordering the attack as a diversion to allow time for Granny to kidnap Kara. On Apokolips, Darkseid brainwashes her into becoming the captain of the Furies.

Batman, Superman and Wonder Woman ask Big Barda to help them to Apokolips, to which she reluctantly agrees. There, Superman infiltrates Darkseid's palace while Wonder Woman and Barda enter the fighting arena, fighting Granny Goodness and the Female Furies. After a fight with Barda killing Stompa to save Wonder Woman, Granny and the other Furies are subdued. Separating himself from the others, Batman finds Darkseid's supply of Hell Spores, the source of the fire pits on Apokolips. Superman encounters Darkseid and is forced to battle the brainwashed Kara. Darkseid watches them fight until Batman confronts Darkseid and informs him that he has activated the Hell Spores, which will destroy Apokolips. He issues Darkseid an ultimatum: free Kara and promise to leave her alone, and Batman will deactivate the Spores. Superman defeats Kara, and Barda and Wonder Woman present Darkseid with the subdued Granny, whereupon Darkseid finally releases Kara, and the heroes leave Apokolips, bringing Kara back to Themyscira.

Back on Earth, with their lives apparently normal again, Clark takes Kara to meet his adoptive parents in Smallville, but they are ambushed by Darkseid; he had promised to leave Kara alone, but not Superman or Earth. After Darkseid launches Superman into space, Kara engages Darkseid in a lengthy battle and manages to hold her own, but he eventually gains the upper hand and knocks her unconscious. Before Darkseid can leave, Superman returns to Earth and reengages him, but Darkseid still does not relent and again overwhelms Superman with his Omega Beams. Kara recovers and uses Darkseid's Mother Box to send him into space. While Superman anticipates Darkseid's eventual return, Kara informs him that she changed the coordinates, leaving him frozen in space.

Having saved her cousin's life and found her place on Earth, Kara decides to use her powers to fight for altruism; under the alias of Supergirl, and she is met with applause by Wonder Woman, the Amazons, and finally Batman. Superman and Supergirl fly to Metropolis together.

== Cast ==
- Andre Braugher as Uxas / Darkseid
- Kevin Conroy as Bruce Wayne / Batman
- Tim Daly as Kal-El / Clark Kent / Superman
- Summer Glau as Kara Zor-El / Supergirl
- Susan Eisenberg as Diana Prince / Wonder Woman
- Julianne Grossman as Big Barda
- Ed Asner as Granny Goodness
- Rachel Quaintance as Lyla Michaels / Harbinger, Artemis (uncredited)
- Salli Saffioti as Gilotina, Mad Harriet (uncredited)
- Andrea Romano as Stompa, Vicki Vale (uncredited)
- Jim Ward as Radio DJ, Cop (uncredited)
- Dave B. Mitchell as Bearded Longshoreman
- Gregory Alan Williams as Terrified Longshoreman
- John Cygan as Male Radio Caller, Gus (uncredited)
- April Winchell as Female Radio Caller 1, Treasure (uncredited)
- Tara Strong as Female Radio Caller 2, Lashina (uncredited)

Notably, Daly, Conroy, Eisenberg and Asner all reprise their respective roles of Superman, Batman, Wonder Woman, and Granny Goodness from the DC Animated Universe.

== Reception ==
The World's Finest said that it was "not something I'll be coming back to any time soon," and specifically targeted Andre Braugher's performance of Darkseid as lacking in any presence. Batman-on-Film gave the film a D, the lowest grade they have given to a DC animated film.

IGN gave the film a positive review with a score of 8 out of 10. The reviewer states the title is misleading as the film is all about "Supergirl of Krypton" but praised the story and Glau's performance for giving depth to the character.

The film earned $6,370,838 from domestic DVD sales and $1,883,591 from domestic Blu-ray sales, bringing its total domestic home video earnings to $8,254,429.
