= Anti-Life Equation =

Fictional mind control formula in DC Comics

The Anti-Life Equation is a fictional concept appearing in American comic books published by DC Comics. Various comics have defined the equation in different ways, but a common interpretation is that the equation may be seen as a mathematical proof of the futility of living, or of life as incarceration of spirit, per predominant religious and modern cultural suppositions.

In Jack Kirby's Fourth World setting, the Anti-Life Equation is a formula for total control over the minds of sentient beings that is sought by the character Darkseid, who, for this reason, sends his forces to Earth, as he believes part of the equation exists in the subconsciousness of humanity.

== History ==
Jack Kirby's original comics established the Anti-Life Equation as giving the power to dominate the will of all sentient and sapient races. It is called the Anti-Life Equation because "if someone possesses absolute control over you — you're not really alive". Most stories featuring the Equation use this concept. The Forever People's Mother Box found the Anti-Life Equation in Sonny Sumo, but Darkseid, unaware of this, stranded him in ancient Japan. A man known as Billion-Dollar Bates had control over the Equation's power without the Mother Box's aid, but was accidentally killed by one of his own guards.

=== Use in storylines ===
When Metron and Swamp Thing attempt to breach the Source, which drives Swamp Thing temporarily mad, Darkseid discovers that part of the formula is love. Upon being told by the Dominators of their planned invasion of Earth, Darkseid promises not to interfere on the condition that the planet is not destroyed so his quest for the Equation is not thwarted.

Martian Manhunter (vol. 2) #33 reveals that Darkseid first became aware of the equation approximately 300 years ago after making contact with the people of Mars. Upon learning of the Martian philosophy that free will and spiritual purpose could be defined by a Life Equation, Darkseid theorized that a negative equivalent must exist.

In Walt Simonson's Orion (2001), Darkseid and DeSaad have gained the Equation from clones of Billion-Dollar Bates. In stopping them, Orion learned the Equation, and tried to use it to make people happy and good, but decided that the suppression of free will is always a bad thing. Mister Miracle knows the formula, but is one of the few with the willpower not to use it. During the series Young Justice, it was stated that Empress possesses a piece of an Anti-Life Equation, which gives her limited mind control abilities. Countdown to Final Crisis #10 reveals that the Pied Piper also contained the equation within his mind and can manifest it through music. DeSaad attempts to use Piper as his pawn to help him destroy Brother Eye and Darkseid so that he could rule Apokolips.

During Final Crisis, Darkseid's plan comes to fruition even without Pied Piper's help. Using the "spoken form" of the Anti-Life, Darkseid has Mokkari unleash it through the Internet, enslaving anyone exposed to it. Libra uses the Anti-Life Equation to turn several members of his Secret Society of Super Villains into Justifiers while some of Earth's heroines and villainesses are converted into new versions of the Female Furies.

It was revealed that the Equation can be countered by drawing the New Genesis word for "freedom" on one's face. Also, Doctor Sivana invented a device that allowed Lex Luthor to wrest control of the Equation-controlled Justifiers from Libra and Darkseid. In Terror Titans #4, Static is revealed to be immune to the Equation's effects due to his electrical powers protecting his brain. In Final Crisis #7, Wonder Woman breaks the Equation's hold over the people of Earth by binding Darkseid with the Lasso of Truth.

After Darkseid's disappearance, the Calculator tasks himself with the role of tracking down the fragments of the Equation left in the Internet, which had taken the appearance of floating diamonds in Alta Viva, an online multiplayer game similar to Second Life. By having real diamonds cut in the shape of the virtual ones, the Calculator hopes to harness and restore its power for himself.

The Multiversity features a different version of the Anti-Life Equation known as the Anti-Death Equation: a dark, mysterious power used by the Gentry, capable of transforming and corroding anything from the laws of physics to even beings as powerful as Monitors, turning its victims into immortal, gruesome, and evil creatures.

In DCU continuity, the Equation remains important to many interested parties, and both incomplete and complete renditions of the Equation have been acquired and wielded by many users. It is first possessed by the Old God Yuga Khan, who uses it to resurrect many of his fallen brethren in a final battle against his sons Uxas (Darkseid) and Izaya before falling in battle. Eventually, many an individual would come to possess either finite understanding or complete utilization of the Anti-Life Equation. Some eons later, Darkseid would use a fraction of its power in his invasion of Earth-Two; soon it was revealed that others possessed the full Equation, but lacked the incentive to use it. The formula itself however is revealed to be a sentient being able to express itself to its current hosts.

It was revealed that the Anti-Life Equation was the source of the Anti-Matter Universe's creation, and that the Anti-Monitor used to be a Qwardian scientist in the Anti-Matter Universe named Mobius who was the first to find and touch the Anti-Life Equation; it then fused with him and transformed him into the Anti-Monitor, the embodiment of the Anti-Life Equation. When Darkseid died in the battle against him and his daughter Grail, Mobius forfeited the equation to return to his original form. The power itself which possessed him is now in the hands of his original benefactor, establishing her as the Goddess of Anti-Life.

== Interpretations of the Equation ==
Over the years, the Anti-Life Equation has changed as various writers have offered their own definitions of the concept.

In Jack Kirby's original version, the Equation manifests itself as the power to control any sentient minds through direct commands. A clear distinction was made between the Anti-Life Equation and other methods of control like manipulation or hypnosis. While Darkseid could already exert some control over humanity through the preachings of his minion Glorious Godfrey, possessing the Equation would allow unlimited and instantaneous control.

In Jim Starlin's miniseries Cosmic Odyssey, the Anti-Life Equation is revealed as a living shadow-based deity that corrupts and destroys everything it touches. This revelation shocks even Darkseid, who teams up with the New Gods and a group of superheroes from Earth to stop the Anti-Life Equation entity, ultimately sealing it off from their reality. The Anti-Life Equation Entity would be retconned as a creature who had been mislabeled as far as having anything to do with the Anti-Life Equation.

In Walt Simonson's Orion series, the Equation is portrayed much like in the original Kirby comics, ignoring the version shown in Cosmic Odyssey. Besides the power to control minds, it is also shown to give its wielder the power to revive corpses through verbal commands.

In Grant Morrison's Seven Soldiers: Mister Miracle mini-series, Darkseid (or Boss Dark Side, as he was calling himself) gained control of the Anti-Life Equation, which is stylized in narration as:

loneliness + alienation + fear + despair + self-worth ÷ mockery ÷ condemnation ÷ misunderstanding × guilt × shame × failure × judgment n=y where y=hope and n=folly, love=lies, life=death, self=dark side

By speaking the equation, Darkseid can insert the full formula into people's minds, giving them the mathematical certainty that life, hope and freedom are all pointless. According to Oracle, who barely escaped the "full" effects of the Equation by shutting down the entire Internet just in time, the Anti-Life Equation further states that the only point in anything is to conform to Darkseid's will. Shilo Norman (the current Mister Miracle) is able to break free from this with the help of Metron, gaining immunity from the Equation in the process. He passes this immunity to his allies by drawing a specific pattern (the pattern is shown to be the New Genesis word for freedom) on their face.

When Jim Starlin returned to writing the New Gods in 2007's Death of the New Gods mini-series, the retcon was revised, with the Anti-Life Equation Entity being revealed to be one-half of a cosmic being that was split into two by the war of the old gods (the other half of the cosmic entity being the Source). In a text page published in Final Crisis Secret Files, Grant Morrison attempts to reconcile the Starlin version of the Anti-Life Equation with their own version, by suggesting that the Equation is indeed sentient (as Starlin suggests) and that even after "mastering" the Equation, Darkseid still does not understand the true horrific nature of what the Anti-Life Equation is and its relationship with the Source.

In The New 52, the Anti-Life has much of the same powers it had before, Yuga Khan having used it to bring back the dead Old Gods to aid him in battle against his sons, Beautiful Dreamer using it for the first time to resurrect a deceased Mark Moonrider, and Darkseid himself using a fraction of it to draw unsuspecting victims to their end by broadcasting it over his Parademon hive factories.

== Life Equation ==
The Anti-Life's opposite member takes more prominence within The New 52. The white Light of Life is said to be the spark that originally gave birth to the positive matter universe of Earth-Zero just as the Anti-Life gave rise to the antimatter universe. Unlike the Anti-Life Equation which saps a person of their free will, The Life Equation is an all consuming power which has the capability to restructure reality by changing its formula around rewriting the very multiverse itself, representing the attributes of life itself pertaining to change and variance. The make up of the equation formula seems to vary from iteration to iteration. One instance relates it to the emotional spectrum and its corresponding seven lights: rage, greed, fear, will, hope, compassion, and love.

Initially believing all of these refractions of the source light to lead in becoming the Life Equation, it is then realized that the formula itself is a separate power all its own connected directly to the Source. Its power once hidden behind the wall of its namesake had been removed and supplanted within the White Ring utilized by Kyle Rayner to escape it after the seven emotional entities gave themselves to both him and it to replenish the Emotional Reservoir. It is later revealed that Kyle managed to escape with the equation in hand after he reached out into the source itself and unknowingly claimed the equation. Once claimed, the Life Equation has the power to redefine reality.

The Life Equation was split into seven parts and placed into Kyle's and six newly created White Power rings. These seven rings can be brought together to restore the Life Equation if needed, but until then, the White Lantern Corps protects the equation.

== Other realities ==
- The Anti-Life Equation appears in the Elseworlds graphic novel Superman: The Dark Side. Jor-El gives it to his son Kal-El before Krypton's destruction so he could use it to subjugate Earth and create a new Krypton. However, Kal-El instead lands on Apokolips, where Darkseid finds him and claims the Equation for himself.
- The Anti-Life Equation appears in Superman and Batman: World's Funnest.
- The Anti-Life Equation appears in DCeased. Darkseid summons the Black Racer to help claim the Equation from Cyborg, inadvertently transforming it into a zombie-like virus.

== In other media ==
=== Television ===
- The Anti-Life Equation appears in the DC Animated Universe series Superman: The Animated Series, Justice League, and Justice League Unlimited. Throughout his appearances, Darkseid seeks the Equation to remake the universe in his image. In the Justice League Unlimited finale "Destroyer", Darkseid attacks Earth, but is stopped by Lex Luthor, who uses the Anti-Life Equation on him. This absorbs them both into the Source Wall.
- The Anti-Life Equation appears in the tenth season of Smallville.
- The Anti-Life Equation appears in the DC Super Hero Girls episode "My So Called Anti-Life". Darkseid, posing as a human math teacher, tricks the Super Hero Girls into solving the Anti-Life Equation for him by putting it on a test. With the completed equation, Darkseid begins transforming Earth's population into duplicates of himself. Batgirl, Harley Quinn, Bumblebee, and Raven manage to reverse the effects by reminding the people of who they really are, which they refer to as "introducing new variables to the equation to change the answer".
- The Anti-Life Equation appears in the Teen Titans Go! episode "Two Parter".
- The Anti-Life Equation appears in the Justice League Action episode "It'll Take a Miracle!".
- The Anti-Life Equation appears in Young Justice. Throughout the third season, Young Justice: Outsiders, Granny Goodness attempts to access the Anti-Life Equation. In the episodes "Antisocial Pathologies" and "Terminus", Goodness uses Halo to access the Equation, intending to spread its influence across the universe. In the episode "Into the Breach", Victor Stone rescues Halo, allowing the Team to stop Goodness.
- The Anti-Life Equation appears in the Supergirl episode "The Bottle Episode".
- The Anti-Life Equation appears in Kite Man: Hell Yeah!. Throughout the series, Darkseid attempts to obtain the Equation, only for it to be transferred into the Queen of Fables' spellbook and taken into Martian Manhunter's possession.

=== Film ===
The Anti-Life Equation appears in Zack Snyder's Justice League.

=== Video games ===
The Anti-Life Equation appears in Lego DC Super-Villains.

== See also ==
- Hypertime
