= Granny Goodness =

DC Comics character

- Granny Goodness as depicted in Mister Miracle #2 (May 1971). Art by Jack Kirby.

Publication information
- Publisher: DC Comics
- First appearance: Mister Miracle #2 (May 1971)
- Created by: Jack Kirby

In-story information
- Alter ego: Goodness
- Species: New God
- Place of origin: Apokolips
- Team affiliations: Female Furies; Darkseid's Elite
- Notable aliases: Athena
- Abilities: Superhuman strength, speed, stamina, and durability; Immortality; Expert strategist, tactician, and field commander; Skilled warrior; Wields mega-rod and advanced technology

Granny Goodness is a supervillain appearing in American comic books published by DC Comics. She is a New God from Apokolips and a servant of Darkseid who trains others to serve him. Goodness is also the leader of the Female Furies, a group of female warriors from Apokolips.

Goodness has appeared in various media outside comics, primarily in association with Darkseid and the New Gods. Ed Asner, Deborah Strang, and Cloris Leachman, among others, have voiced the character in animation.

== Publication history ==
Granny Goodness first appeared in Mister Miracle #2 (May 1971) and was created by Jack Kirby. Her appearance was modeled after Phyllis Diller.

== Fictional character biography ==
Granny Goodness was originally part of the Lowlies, the oppressed peasant class of Apokolips. She was removed from her parents and trained to be one of Darkseid's elite, the "Hounds". During her training, Goodness is given a guard dog named Mercy, whom she develops a close bond with. Goodness is forced to kill Mercy to become a Hound; Darkseid is impressed and tells Goodness that she has graduated with honors.

After proving herself to be one of Darkseid's elite and most reliable soldiers, Goodness is tasked with running the "Orphanage", a training camp for his minions. Goodness is also the leader of the Female Furies. She raised Highfather's son Scott Free as part of a peace treaty before he escaped from her orphanage, becoming the first person to do so.

In the series Amazons Attack!, Granny Goodness poses as Athena, manipulating the Amazons into going to war. Goodness also appears in the series Countdown to Final Crisis, where she holds the Olympian Gods prisoner. After the gods are freed by Mary Marvel, Holly Robinson and Harley Quinn, Goodness is attacked and killed by Infinity-Man.

Goodness is reincarnated on Earth, along with the other New Gods, as a member of Darkseid's gang. However, her body is destroyed by Black Alice. In the "Final Crisis" storyline, Goodness takes the body of the Alpha Lantern Kraken and uses it to attack John Stewart and frame Hal Jordan for the assault.

== Powers and abilities ==
As a New God, Granny Goodness possesses superhuman physical abilities and is functionally immortal. She also wields advanced weaponry, including the Mega-Rod, a staff that can project concussive energy blasts.

== Reception ==
Granny Goodness has been described as a symbol of the "monstrous feminine" who "violates traditional paradigms of motherhood and femininity" through her wickedness, as opposed to more traditional, nurturing depictions of motherhood in fiction.

== Other versions ==
- An alternate timeline version of Granny Goodness appears in the "Rock of Ages" storyline. This version fused with a Mother Box, gaining teleportation and pyrokinesis.
- Granny Harkness, a fusion of Granny Goodness and Marvel Comics character Agatha Harkness, appears in the Amalgam Comics one-shot Bullets and Bracelets.

== In other media ==
=== Television ===
- Granny Goodness appears in series set in the DC Animated Universe (DCAU), voiced by Ed Asner.
  - Introduced in Superman: The Animated Series, this version is the second leader of Intergang following Bruno Mannheim's death before being defeated by Supergirl and forced out of the position.
  - Goodness appears in Justice League Unlimited. Following Darkseid's death in the Justice League episode "Twilight", she battles Virman Vundabar for control of Apokolips.
- Granny Goodness makes a cameo appearance in a flashback in the Legion of Super Heroes episode "Unnatural Alliances" as Imperiex's former master on Apokolips.
- Granny Goodness appears in Smallville, portrayed by Nancy Bell in "Salvation" and by Christine Willes in the tenth season.
- Granny Goodness appears in Justice League Action, voiced by Cloris Leachman.
- Granny Goodness appears in Young Justice: Outsiders, voiced by Deborah Strang. This version utilizes the human alias of Gretchen Goode and is initially an ally of the Light before leaving them to seek the Anti-Life Equation for the second time as Granny Godness, serving to Darkseid.
- Granny Goodness appears in the Harley Quinn episode "Inner (Para) Demons", voiced by Jessica Walter.

=== Film ===
- Granny Goodness appears in Superman/Batman: Apocalypse, voiced again by Ed Asner.
- An alternate universe variant of Granny Goodness appears in a flashback in Justice League: Gods and Monsters, voiced by Khary Payton.
- Granny Goodness appears in Zack Snyder's Justice League through computer-generated imagery (CGI), modeled after the aunt of Wētā FX artist Jojo Aguilar.

=== Video games ===
- Granny Goodness appears in DC Universe Online, voiced by Lainie Frasier.
- Granny Goodness appears as a boss and unlockable playable character in Lego DC Super-Villains, voiced by Diane Delano.
- Granny Goodness appears as a support card in the mobile version of Injustice: Gods Among Us.
- Granny Goodness appears as a character summon in Scribblenauts Unmasked: A DC Comics Adventure.

=== Miscellaneous ===
- Granny Goodness appears in DC Super Hero Girls and its tie-in films, voiced by April Stewart. This version is a librarian at Super Hero High.
- Granny Goodness appears in DC X Sonic the Hedgehog.
