= Darkseid =

DC Comics supervillain

- Darkseid, taken from a variant cover of DC KO #5 (March 2026). Art by Javier Fernández.

Publication information
- Publisher: DC Comics
- First appearance: Superman's Pal Jimmy Olsen #134 (December 1970)
- Created by: Jack Kirby

In-story information
- Alter ego: Uxas
- Species: New God
- Place of origin: Apokolips
- Team affiliations: Darkseid's Elite; Female Furies; Intergang; Secret Society of Super Villains; Legion of Doom; Injustice League
- Notable aliases: Lord of Apokolips; God of Evil; Anti-Life God; Boss Dark Side
- Abilities: See list: Genius-level intellect; Master tactician; Superhuman strength, speed, stamina, durability, and reflexes; Immortality; Invulnerability; Skilled hand-to-hand combatant; Omega Effect; Omega Beams; Flight; Telekinesis; Telepathy; Dimensional travel; Matter and energy manipulation

Darkseid (/ˈdɑːrksaɪd/) is a supervillain appearing in American comic books published by DC Comics. Created by writer-artist Jack Kirby, the character first made a cameo appearance in Superman's Pal Jimmy Olsen #134 (December 1970), before being fully introduced in Forever People #1 (February 1971). Formerly known as Uxas, Darkseid is a New God and the tyrannical ruler of the planet Apokolips. His ultimate goal is to find and gain control over the Anti-Life Equation to enslave the multiverse by eliminating all hope and free will in sentient beings. Regarded as one of the most powerful beings in the DC Universe, Darkseid serves as one of Superman's greatest adversaries and the archenemy of the Justice League.

Darkseid has been adapted in various media incarnations, having made his live-action feature debut in the 2021 DC Extended Universe film Zack Snyder's Justice League, portrayed by Ray Porter. Michael Ironside, Andre Braugher, Tony Todd, "Weird Al" Yankovic, and others have provided the character's voice in media ranging from animation to video games.

== Publication history ==
Darkseid was created by writer-artist Jack Kirby to serve as the chief antagonist of his "Fourth World" metaseries. The character was first seen briefly in a series of cameos that started in Superman's Pal Jimmy Olsen #134 (December 1970), before making his first full appearance in Forever People #1 (February 1971). Kirby modeled Darkseid's face on actor Jack Palance and based his personality on Adolf Hitler and Richard Nixon.

Though Darkseid was originally conceived as the primary villain for the New Gods, he would eventually be established as an archenemy of Superman and the Justice League.

Darkseid has had a large influence in pop culture and other comics; most notably, Kirby's creation is credited as the inspiration for Marvel Comics' high-profile villain Thanos by his creators.

Mark Evanier, who spent several years as Kirby's assistant, has stated that 'Darkseid' is pronounced "As if spelled 'dark side,' as in 'the dark side of man's nature'", noting that this was "how Kirby always pronounced it around me"; however, Evanier has also stated that "at least once, when some fan who pronounced it 'dark seed' was excitedly telling [Kirby] his theories about the character, [Kirby] went along with it, rather than correct the kid."

== Fictional character biography ==
Darkseid, as originally depicted by creator Jack Kirby in a pin-up page from New Gods #6 (December 1971).

Prince Uxas, the son of King Yuga Khan and Queen Heggra and the second-in-line to the throne of Apokolips, plotted to seize control over the planet from his older brother, Drax. When Drax attempted to claim the fabled Omega Force, Uxas murdered him and claimed its power for himself. His skin turned to stone, and Uxas rechristened himself as Darkseid. At some point, he fell in love with an Apokoliptian scientist and sorceress named Suli, with whom he had a son, Kalibak. However, Heggra ordered DeSaad to poison Suli out of the belief that she was corrupting her son.

Following Suli's death, Darkseid's heart grew even colder and his disdain for his mother intensified when she forced him to marry a woman named Tigra, with whom he had another son, Orion. Seeking vengeance against Heggra for killing the one he loved, Darkseid ordered DeSaad to poison her so he could finally become the supreme monarch of Apokolips. Darkseid then tried to force Tigra to eliminate Orion, but the latter was ultimately traded with Highfather's son, Scott Free, as part of a peace treaty between the warring planets of Apokolips and New Genesis. This trade eventually became a setback for Darkseid, with Orion growing up to value and defend the ideals of New Genesis as a powerful champion in opposition to his father. The prophecy foretold that Darkseid would meet his final defeat at the hands of Orion in a cataclysmic battle in the fiery Armaghetto of Apokolips. Likewise, Darkseid and his training minion, Granny Goodness, were unable to break Scott Free's spirit after a long, torturous upbringing and Free ultimately managed to escape Apokolips, taking with him the Female Fury Big Barda, who he married. Free, now known as the superhero Mister Miracle, and Barda began living on Earth, and Darkseid used this "betrayal" as a pretext to declare the treaty with New Genesis abrogated so the planets could resume their conflict.

Darkseid's goal was to eliminate all free will from the universe, supplanting the Presence as its Supreme Being. To this end, he sought to unravel the mysterious Anti-Life Equation, which gives its user complete control over the thoughts and emotions of all living beings in the universe. Darkseid had tried on several other occasions to achieve dominance of the universe through other methods, most notably through his minion Glorious Godfrey, who could control people's minds with his voice. He had a special interest in Earth, as he believed humans possess collectively within their minds most, if not all, fragments of the Anti-Life Equation.

Darkseid intended to probe the minds of every human to piece together the Equation. This has caused him to clash with many superheroes of the DC Universe, most notably Superman. Darkseid worked behind the scenes, using superpowered minions in his schemes to overthrow Earth, including working through Intergang, a crime syndicate which employs Apokoliptian technology and later becomes a religious cult that worships Darkseid.

=== The Great Darkness Saga ===
One thousand years in the future, Darkseid has been absent for centuries and is almost completely forgotten. He returns and comes into conflict with that era's champions, the Legion of Super-Heroes. After using both scientific and magical methods to enhance his power, Darkseid transposes the planets Apokolips and Daxam—which places Daxam under a yellow sun and gives each of its inhabitants Kryptonian-like superpowers equal to those of Superman. Darkseid places the Daxamites under his control and uses them in an attempt to conquer the universe. However, he is eventually defeated by the Legion and many of their allies.

Seeing other deities as a threat, Darkseid invades Themyscira to discover the secret location of the Olympian deities, planning to overthrow the Olympians and steal their power. Refusing to aid Darkseid in his mad quest, the Amazons battled his Parademon troops, causing half of the Amazon population's death. Wonder Woman was able to gain her revenge against Darkseid for killing so many of her sisters by placing a portion of her own soul into Darkseid. This supposedly weakened the god's power as he lost a portion of his dark edge.

=== The Seven Soldiers and "Boss Dark Side" ===
In Grant Morrison's 2005 Mister Miracle limited series, it was revealed that Darkseid had finally discovered the Anti-Life Equation, which he then used to destroy the Fourth World altogether. The New Gods fled to Earth, where they hid. Highfather and his followers were now a group of homeless people. Metron used a wheelchair, the Black Racer was an old white man in a wheelchair, DeSaad was an evil psychiatrist, Granny Goodness was a pimp (or "madam") for the Female Furies and Darkseid himself was now an evil gang leader who is referred to only as "Boss Dark Side". It is revealed that Darkseid actually gave the Sheeda North America in return for Aurakles, Earth's first superhero. This was, in turn, purely for Darkseid to get Shilo Norman, whom he considers the "Avatar of Freedom", in his clutches so that he could eventually destroy the New Gods.

=== Final Crisis ===
As prophesied, Orion returns to Earth via boom tube for his final battle with Darkseid. During the fight, Orion kills Darkseid by ripping his heart out, which created a firepit of Apokolips from Darkseid's chest cavity (in reference to the prophecy of their final battle). As Darkseid dies, a battered, wounded Orion walks away from the battlefield, having "won" the battle against his father once and for all. However, Darkseid's life essence endured even the death of his body and fell back in time, where he was reborn as "Boss Dark Side", aided by his resurrected minions and the supervillain Libra.

Once again bound to the form of a human, "Boss Dark Side" began to appear in a number of titles in the run up to Final Crisis. In The Flash vol. 2 #240, he led an army of fanatics, their will broken by the "spoken form" of the Anti-Life Equation, to kidnap the Tornado Twins. In Birds of Prey #118, he runs his Dark Side Club where superhumans fight to the death, brainwashed by drugs produced by Bernadeth. In Teen Titans #59, it is revealed that Darkseid had employed the Terror Titans to capture the Teen Titans and use them in his club fights.

In Final Crisis, Darkseid begins to take over Earth and corrupt the multiverse with the aid of Libra, who converts much of the Secret Society of Super Villains to his cause with the aid of the Crime Bible and the Holy Lance. Darkseid is also joined by the souls of his fellow evil New Gods, who, like Darkseid, now possess either modified human bodies or the bodies of other superpowered beings, such as Mary Marvel.

Darkseid also arranges for detective Dan Turpin to be lured into the Dark Side Club, where Turpin is turned into Darkseid's "final host", as his Boss Dark Side body has begun to mummify due to Darkseid's presence. With his legion of followers and allies aiding him as he undergoes his latest "rebirth", Darkseid successfully conquers the Earth with the unleashing of the Anti-Life Equation onto mankind. However, the rebirthing process is far from complete as Turpin's mind and soul, while corrupted by Darkseid's essence, remains in control over his body. However, at the same moment Shilo Norman, the "Embodiment of Freedom" is shot by S.H.A.D.E. operatives, thus signalling the "Victory of Evil". Darkseid wins control over Turpin, who is transformed to resemble him. Darkseid then gains the fullest of his power, his "fall" having the effect of compressing and crumpling spacetime around Earth.

After escaping from captivity, Batman shoots Darkseid with the same radion bullet that killed Orion, while Darkseid simultaneously hits Batman with the Omega Beam, sending him back in time and then "infecting" Batman with Omega energy that will cause him to jump forward in time, with disastrous results when he reaches the present. Darkseid is mortally wounded, but not before his Omega Sanction teleports Batman into prehistoric times. Remains believed to be Batman's (later revealed to be the last of the many Batman clones that Darkseid created) are found by Superman, who confronts Darkseid. As Darkseid mocks his old enemy for failing to defend Earth, it emerges that in Darkseid's fall through the multiverse, he created a doomsday singularity that now threatens all of existence. When Superman attempts to physically assault him, Darkseid reveals that he now exists inside the bodies of all those who fell to the power of the Anti-Life Equation and that killing Darkseid will kill humanity. Darkseid then reloads the gun that was used to shoot him, to kill Orion by way of firing the bullet backwards in time (a move Superman deems to be suicide due to the paradoxical nature of his actions: the bullet used to kill Orion is ultimately fired at him by Batman and is now poisoning him to death).

Before Darkseid can use the Omega Effect to kill Superman, Barry Allen and Wally West lead the Black Racer to Darkseid and making contact with him frees Turpin from Darkseid's control. Wonder Woman (having been freed from possession by one of Darkseid's minions) uses the Lasso of Truth to bind Darkseid, effectively freeing humanity from the Anti-Life Equation. In his final effort, Darkseid's essence appears and tries to seize the Miracle Machine Superman has created; however, Superman uses counter-vibrations to destroy him. Furthermore, the last piece of Darkseid's plan fails when Batman escapes the Omega Sanction.

Doctor Impossible manipulates the Crime Syndicate of America into helping him resurrect Darkseid via a machine that draws energy from the multiverse. The resurrection backfires and creates a new being known as the Omega Man.

=== The New 52 ===
In September 2011, The New 52 rebooted DC's continuity. In this new timeline, Darkseid's name is first invoked by a Parademon in Justice League #1. He is later mentioned again in Justice League #2, and in Justice League #3 Darkseid makes his first appearance in the series, seen in a vision by Victor Stone after he is injured by an exploding Mother Box. In the final pages of Justice League #4, Darkseid himself appears. In Justice League #5, the League confronts him but they are overpowered by him, when he severely hurts Superman with his Omega Beams and breaks Green Lantern's arm. Finally, in Justice League #6, Darkseid is driven out when Cyborg activates the invaders' Mother Boxes and Superman forces him through a boom tube. The incidents that occur in these issues make Darkseid the first foe the newly formed League faces as a team. The issue also reveals DeSaad and Steppenwolf, referring to Darkseid's daughter and their ceaseless search for her across countless worlds. Darkseid's daughter escapes containment in Justice League of America's Vibe after the dampeners on her cage are temporarily disabled.

In the New 52 continuity, there is only one set of New Gods across the multiverse. As Darkseid invades Prime Earth in Justice League, he sends Steppenwolf to do the same, with greater success, on Earth 2, resulting in the deaths of Batman, Superman, and Wonder Woman, and stranding Helena Wayne and Kara Zor-L on Prime Earth. Five years later, Darkseid once again invades Earth 2, which never fully recovered from his armies' earlier assault, and it is revealed that he and Highfather of New Genesis struck a deal allowing him the unchallenged right to invade Earth 2.

In Darkseid #1, his background story was revealed. Formerly a farmer named Uxas, he hated the deities of his world. So he traveled up to their mountain while they slept and tricked them all into fighting each other. As they were all weakened from the war, he killed them one by one with his scythe and stole their power before destroying his world and creating Apokolips.

In Justice League: The Darkseid War (after the retirement of the "New 52" imprint), Darkseid comes into conflict with the Anti-Monitor. Darkseid's daughter Grail leads the Anti-Monitor, who is revealed to be a scientist named Mobius, to Darkseid for the former to kill the latter. Mobius believes that with the death of Darkseid, he will be free from being the Anti-Monitor. After an intense battle, the Anti-Monitor fuses the Black Racer with Flash and sends it after Darkseid. Using the fused Flash and his own powers, he kills Darkseid. With Darkseid dead, the universe is unbalanced as it has lost its God of Evil. Lex Luthor later fuses with the Omega Sanction, becoming the new ruler of Apokolips.

After killing the Anti-Monitor using an Anti-Life Equation-powered Steve Trevor, Grail resurrects Darkseid through the newborn child of Superwoman. The child has the same powers as his father Mazahs, with the ability to steal the powers of others. Stealing the new "God" abilities of the Justice League, Grail fuses them with the child and brings Darkseid back to life. However, he is under her complete control. Grail later attempts to redeem herself by seemingly killing Darkseid with the Anti-Life Equation. However, it is later revealed that she reincarnated him back as a baby with the intention of teaching him differently.

Sometime afterwards, Darkseid matures into a toddler and demands to feast on the Old Gods to return to his original self. After killing A.R.G.U.S. agents that were hunting them down, Darkseid and Grail began hunting down and taking the life force of Zeus' demigod children, killing several including Perseus and Hercules, and growing into the size of a child. After recruiting Jason and luring Wonder Woman to him, Darkseid ages once again into a young man. He fights Wonder Woman himself and as he starts to drain her life force, he is betrayed by Jason. When Zeus appears and transforms into his true form, Darkseid fights Zeus. When they take a Boom Tube to Manila, Philippines, Zeus grabs onto Darkseid and unleashes bolts of lightning on him. However, Darkseid reveals that he planned for this and that his true target was Zeus himself, and he begins to drain and kill him, restoring Darkseid back to his original self.

=== New Justice ===
After countless alien planets being held captive by Brainiac's race are freed, they venture into an unknown area of outer space called the "Ghost Sector." After remembering a prophecy his father told him, and noticing the crack in the Source Wall, Darkseid lures Cyborg, Starfire, and Azrael to the Ghost Sector in an attempt to use their powers to conquer the multiverse.

Being successful with the team's entrapment, Darkseid reveals to Cyborg that a bond was established between them when Cyborg merged with Darkseid's Mother Box. According to the prophecy, the alien worlds were hidden because of the Old Gods they worshipped.

=== Infinite Frontier ===
In Infinite Frontier, Darkseid is trapped in Earth-Omega following the restoration of the multiverse. He regains his original form by fusing with his alternate universe counterparts. Darkseid's former henchmen reunite with him on Earth-Omega and remain by his side as he gains a new follower named X-Tract, Cameron Chase's Earth-Two counterpart.

Darkseid battles the Justice League Incarnate, but is defeated by the Great Hand and sent to a mysterious place where he is controlled by Pariah and the Great Darkness. He is freed after Nightwing fends off the Great Darkness and returns to Apokolips.

=== DC All In ===
In DC All In, Darkseid bonds with the Spectre using the Miracle Machine before allowing himself to be killed in battle with the Justice League to become unbound from time and space. He travels to another universe and corrupts it with his influence, transforming it into the Absolute Universe. Darkseid's death brings imbalance to the universe, leading to the events of New Gods (vol. 5).

== Powers and abilities ==
A New God wielding godlike powers, Darkseid possesses a host of powers; having a superhuman physiology, he is strong enough to break a Green Lantern's power ring with his bare hands, contend with Kryptonians and members of the Justice League, and moves in superhuman speeds, able to react in nanoseconds. Even in a weakened state, he is capable of battling Olympian Gods (such as Zeus). He also has the power to increase his physical size (being incomprehensibly massive in his true form as a New God), can teleport himself or others through time and space, has telepathy, telekinesis, and he can create psionic avatars. This allowed him transpose positions of two planets in different solar systems, taking mental control of the entire population of a planet, instantly absorbing all the information from another being's mind, pronouncing a curse, manifesting the worst fears of other beings as realities. He also has cosmic awareness and senses, having been able to sense death of his son, Orion and fluctuations of the energy of the "Godwave". Darkseid is able to drain the life force of other godly beings to rejuvenate himself or return to his full power. Demi-gods are capable of slowly rejuvenating Darkseid, but a god such as Zeus can return Darkseid back to his original form by draining the demi-gods.

Darkseid is also a highly skilled hand-to-hand combatant, who has been trained in the art of war on Apokolips. He is also proficient with a variety of weapons. As the ruler of Apokolips, Darkseid has access to all of its military and technological resources. Despite his extraordinary physical powers, he rarely engages himself personally in confrontations, as he prefers to use his superhuman intelligence to manipulate or control others to his ends.

=== Omega Effect ===
His most well-known powers are the cosmic force as the Omega Effect (also known as Omega Force and Omega Sanction). Often used as "Omega Beams" shot from his eyes, the beams are an intense form of heated energy that can act as a concussive force, can disintegrate organisms or objects, can cause a target to have never existed and can resurrect fallen beings killed by them. He also could use them to fuel other's source of powers, having used his Omega Beams to grant power to Mary Marvel and her powers afterwards were based on Anti-Life rather than magic. Darkseid has pinpoint control of this energy and can direct the beams to travel in straight lines, curve around corners and even pass through matter or other forms of energy. Some super-powered beings, such as Superman and Doomsday, can resist the Beams, although in the case of Superman, with a great deal of pain. Orion and Wonder Woman were able to deflect them, Firestorm once used his powers to redirect them, Darkseid sometimes uses the beams to punish those who fail him but are too valuable to kill outright, returning them to life when he requires them again. They can also traps organisms in a series of alternate realities in which they die. Upon their death, they are resurrected in a new reality, in which they die in a worse and more painful manner than the previous.

=== Weaknesses ===
While Darkseid is a deity and immortal, having lived for several hundred thousand years, he is not invincible and has been killed on several occasions. Like other New Gods, the rare material known as radion is considered toxic to him. Several characters are also capable of defeating Darkseid in battle: each member of the Quintessence, Superman, Orion, Black Racer, Eclipso, and Doomsday. In one story, Glorious Godfrey also claimed the Helmet of Fate possess power that surpasses Darkseid.

== Other versions ==
=== Injustice vs. Masters of the Universe ===
Darkseid appears in the crossover comic Injustice vs. Masters of the Universe. He battles Superman and He-Man before being killed by He-Man. Following his death, Darkseid is transformed into pure knowledge and claimed by the elders of Grayskull.

=== DC X Sonic the Hedgehog ===
Darkseid appears in the crossover comic series DC x Sonic the Hedgehog. Serving as the main antagonist in the first miniseries Chaos Crisis, he arrives in Sonic's universe via the Ragna Rock to obtain a new source of power from the seven Chaos Emeralds, leading Sonic and his friends to team up with the Justice League to stop him.

== In other media ==
=== Television ===
==== Live-action ====
- Darkseid appears in the tenth and final season of Smallville, voiced by an uncredited actor. This version primarily appears as a non-corporeal being with superhuman strength, telekinesis and the ability to transform into smoke. According to Carter Hall, Darkseid was present on Earth during many of humanity's darkest hours, including the Spanish Inquisition and Third Reich. Granny Goodness claims that Kali, Hades and Lucifer are all names that Darkseid has been called on Earth. After awakening from a rift in the universe, Darkseid instigates an anti-vigilante movement and corrupts countless humans, including Gordon Godfrey and General Slade Wilson, to pull Apokolips towards Earth. In the two-part series finale, Darkseid made a deal involving Lex Luthor's revival in exchange for possession of Lionel Luthor's body to confront Clark Kent, who seemingly destroys him.
  - The comic book continuation reveals that Darkseid survived and restored his physical form.

==== Animation ====
- Darkseid appears as a recurring antagonist in the later Super Friends series, voiced by Frank Welker.
  - Darkseid first appears in Super Friends: The Legendary Super Powers Show.
  - Darkseid appears as a recurring antagonist in The Super Powers Team: Galactic Guardians.

Darkseid as he appears in Superman: The Animated Series

- Darkseid appears in the DC Animated Universe, voiced by Michael Ironside.
  - The character is introduced in Superman: The Animated Series. Darkseid defies the peace treaty between Apokolips and its sister planet New Genesis by searching for the Anti-Life Equation to remake the universe in his image. Following the repeated failures of his underlings, Darkseid personally defeats Superman, kills Dan Turpin and nearly succeeds in conquering Earth until New Genesis' forces declare the planet to be under their protection. In the series finale, Darkseid has Superman brainwashed into thinking he is his adopted son and invading Earth for him. Superman breaks free of Darkseid's influence and confronts him on Apokolips. Darkseid is defeated, but survives, as his servants come to his aid.
  - Darkseid returns in the Justice League episode "Twilight". He works with and later betrays Brainiac before being killed when Brainiac's base is destroyed.
  - In the Justice League Unlimited episodes "Alive!" and "Destroyer", Lex Luthor accidentally resurrects Darkseid while attempting to revive Brainiac. Luthor and Metron retrieve the Anti-Life Equation, which Luthor uses to absorb himself and Darkseid into the Source Wall.
- Darkseid appears in Batman: The Brave and the Bold, voiced by Michael-Leon Wooley.
- Darkseid appears in Young Justice, voiced again by Michael-Leon Wooley. This version is an ally of Vandal Savage, with whom he made a deal to aid each other in their respective conquests. When Earth and Apokolips are the only two worlds remaining, a final battle would determine who controls the universe.
- Darkseid appears in Teen Titans Go!, voiced by "Weird Al" Yankovic. The character even mentions his voice actor by insulting him.
- Darkseid appears in Justice League Action, voiced by Jonathan Adams.
- Darkseid appears in the DC Super Hero Girls episode "My So Called Anti-Life", voiced by John DiMaggio.
- Darkseid appears in Harley Quinn, voiced again by Michael Ironside. This version is a benefactor to Harley Quinn.
  - Darkseid appears in Kite Man: Hell Yeah!, voiced by Keith David.
- Darkseid will appear in the DC Universe series Mister Miracle.

=== Film ===
==== Live-action ====
- In 2014, Bryan Singer revealed that during early development of the scrapped Superman Returns sequel, Darkseid was considered to be the main antagonist.

===== DC Extended Universe =====
Darkseid as he appears in Zack Snyder's Justice League (2021).

Darkseid is featured in the DC Extended Universe.

- The character is first alluded to in Batman v Superman: Dawn of Justice. During a Knightmare sequence, Bruce Wayne experiences a vision of the future in which Darkseid has taken over the Earth and used the Anti-Life Equation to manipulate Superman into becoming his servant.
- Darkseid is mentioned in the 2017 theatrical release of Justice League and appears in Zack Snyder's 2021 director's cut, voiced and motion-captured by Ray Porter. In the latter version of the film, Darkseid gives his disgraced uncle Steppenwolf a chance at redemption by using three Mother Boxes to xenoform and conquer the Earth in his name. After the Justice League defeats Steppenwolf, Darkseid vows to extract the Anti-Life Equation from the Earth himself.
- Darkseid was set to appear in New Gods prior to its cancellation.

==== Animation ====
- Darkseid appears in Superman/Batman: Apocalypse voiced by Andre Braugher. He brainwashes Kara Zor-El into replacing Big Barda as the commander of his Female Furies, only for Superman, Batman and Wonder Woman to journey to Apokolips to free Kara from his influence. Darkseid then ambushes Superman and Kara at their farm in Smallville, but is transported away via boom tube before he can kill them.
- Darkseid appears in the DC Animated Movie Universe, voiced by Steve Blum in Justice League: War and by Tony Todd for subsequent appearances.
  - In Justice League: War, Darkseid and his forces attempt to invade and xenoform Earth only to be sent back to Apokolips via Boom Tube by a group of heroes that band together to form the Justice League.
  - In Reign of the Supermen, Darkseid is revealed to be the mastermind behind the previous film's events as he is responsible for the creation of Doomsday and the transformation of Hank Henshaw into Cyborg Superman as a means of orchestrating a second invasion of Earth.
  - In Justice League Dark: Apokolips War, Darkseid creates an army of "Paradooms" (hybrids of Parademons and Doomsday clones) and brutally kills heroes and villains alike before conquering Earth. Years later, Superman and the other survivors of the invasion launch a coordinated attack on Apokolips, freeing several mutilated heroes like Cyborg and Batman from Darkseid's influence and using the demon Trigon against him. Using the connections to the planet, Cyborg sacrifices himself to send himself, Darkseid, Trigon, and Apokolips into oblivion.
  - A young Darkseid appears in a flashback in Justice League: Crisis on Infinite Earths. Following up on the ending of Justice League Dark: Apokolips War, it was revealed that Flash created another Flashpoint by killing Darkseid, creating an alternate reality where Darkseid does not exist.
- Darkseid appears in Lego DC Comics Super Heroes: Justice League vs. Bizarro League, voiced by Tony Todd.
- An alternate universe version of Darkseid appears in a flashback in Justice League: Gods and Monsters, voiced by Bruce Thomas. This version allowed a peace treaty between Apokolips and New Genesis by allowing Bekka to marry his son Orion. However, Bekka's family killed Darkseid and those with him.
- Darkseid appears in Lego DC Comics Super Heroes: Justice League: Attack of the Legion of Doom, voiced by Tony Todd. This version is the benefactor of the Legion of Doom.
- Darkseid appears in Teen Titans Go! vs. Teen Titans, voiced again by "Weird Al" Yankovic.

=== Video games ===
- Darkseid appears in Superman: The Game.
- Darkseid appears in Justice League Task Force, voiced by Matt Uelmen.
- Darkseid appears in Superman 64, voiced again by Michael Ironside.
- Darkseid appears in Superman: Shadow of Apokolips, voiced by Kevin Michael Richardson.
- Darkseid appears in Justice League Heroes, voiced by David Sobolov. He is freed from his extradimensional prison by Brainiac, who promises him unlimited power. He takes a Mother Box and a "Sensory Matrix Hypercube" to transform Earth into a New Apokolips and takes Superman as his prize. The League defeat him, sending him back to his prison in the cube, while the Mother Box reverses Darkseid's damage to Earth.
- Darkseid appears as a boss in Puzzle & Dragons.
- Darkseid appears as a boss in DC Universe Online.
- Darkseid appears in Scribblenauts Unmasked: A DC Comics Adventure.

==== Mortal Kombat ====
- Darkseid appears in Mortal Kombat vs. DC Universe, voiced by Perry Brown. After the Mortal Kombat and DC universes are merged, Darkseid is fused with Shao Kahn to create Dark Kahn. After Dark Kahn is destroyed, Darkseid is transported to the Mortal Kombat universe and imprisoned in the Netherrealm.
- Darkseid appears as a skin for Geras in Mortal Kombat 11.

==== Lego ====
- Darkseid appears as a playable character in Lego Batman 3: Beyond Gotham, voiced by Travis Willingham.
- Darkseid appears as a playable character in Lego DC Super-Villains, voiced again by Michael Ironside. He sends the Crime Syndicate of America to find the Anti-Life Equation, forcing the Justice League and the Legion of Doom to join forces to defeat him. Following their defeat, Darkseid and his minions are brainwashed into reforming.

==== Injustice ====
- Darkseid appears as a non-playable character in Injustice: Gods Among Us via the Hall of Justice stage. He is also available as a playable character in the game's IOS version.
- Darkseid is featured as a preorder bonus and later-DLC character in Injustice 2, voiced again by Michael-Leon Wooley.

=== Music ===
- American rapper Isaiah Rashad named the opening track of The House is Burning after the character, whose nemesis Mister Miracle Rashad frequently compares himself to.

=== Miscellaneous ===
Darkseid appears in the Injustice: Gods Among Us prequel comic.

== Reception ==
Darkseid was ranked as the 6th Greatest Comic Book Villain of All Time by IGN and the 23rd Greatest Villain of All Time by Wizard magazine.

== See also ==
- "The Great Darkness Saga"
- List of Superman enemies
- Thanos - A Marvel character influenced by Darkseid.
