= Apokolips =

Planet in the DC Comics universe

- Apokolips as depicted in History of the DC Universe #1. Art by George Pérez.
- First appearance: The New Gods #1 (February 1971)
- Created by: Jack Kirby
- Races: New Gods; Parademons; Dreggs
- Characters: Darkseid; Granny Goodness; DeSaad; Kalibak; Steppenwolf; Devilance; Kanto; Virman Vundabar; Grayven; Female Furies; Deep Six; Parademons
- Publisher: DC Comics

Apokolips is a fictional planet that appears in American comic books published by DC Comics. The planet is ruled by Darkseid, established in Jack Kirby's Fourth World series, and is integral to many stories in the DC Universe. Apokolips is considered the opposite of the planet New Genesis.

Apokolips is a large planet covered entirely by a city (an ecumenopolis). It is a notoriously dismal place, where Hunger Dogs (low-class citizens) labor to feed the pits that supply light and power to the world. Both Apokolips and New Genesis exist in a different plane of existence, located near the Source that originated the Old and New Gods.

Apokolips represents a dystopian society. As Jack Misselhorn writes: "No one on Apokolips evolves spiritually because there is no love. It is a stagnant society, its inhabitants living in ignorance, the legacy of oppression".

Because it exists in another dimension outside of the multiverse, Apokolips is primarily accessed via Boom Tubes. It has been said that the New Gods are normally giants, and that travel through the Boom Tubes rescales them to mortal proportions. The size difference varies; Supergirl found herself confronted with Apokoliptians the size of skyscrapers, while Superman found that entire planets from his universe fitted in his hand while on Apokolips.

== Fictional history ==
Apokolips and its counterpart New Genesis were created after the destruction of Urgrund, the world of the "Old Gods" (implied to be the gods of Norse mythology). While New Genesis was given strength and nobility from the "living atoms" of the Old God Balduur, Apokolips was saturated with evil from an unnamed sorceress. The two planets are locked in an eternal war, symbolizing the struggle of evil and good on a grand, mythological scale. Apokolips is ruled by a fell being known as Darkseid, a dark leader who rules over his downtrodden people by force and fear and murdered his mother Heggra to obtain the throne.

=== Seven Soldiers ===
Both Apokolips and New Genesis were seemingly destroyed in a final battle prior to Grant Morrison's miniseries Seven Soldiers: Mister Miracle. However, the final issue of that series implied that the story's earlier events were merely visions seen by the hero as part of an elaborate test by the New God Metron. How much of the battle really happened and the current status of the New Gods remains to be seen.

=== Countdown to Final Crisis ===
Using Boom Tube technology, Brother Eye arrives on Apokolips and seemingly assimilates the entire planet. Before the assimilation is fully complete, the Pied Piper intervenes and channels the Anti-Life Equation through his flute. This destroys much of Brother Eye, causing it to flee and reverting much of Apokolips to normal.

=== Death of the New Gods ===
At the end of the Death of the New Gods miniseries, with all the gods now dead, the combined entity born from the melding of the Source and the Anti-Life Equation merges Apokolips and New Genesis into a single planet.

=== The Great Darkness Saga ===
In the 30th century, original Legion of Super-Heroes continuity, Apokolips is inactive and Darkseid is incapacitated. In the reboot Legion continuity, Darkseid was aged and dying, with the planet mostly uninhabited, but the center of a large cult.

=== The New 52: Earth-0 and Earth-2 ===
In DC continuity following its 2011 Flashpoint event and the launch of its New 52 line of comics, the DC Multiverse remains composed of 52 worlds, but only one set of New Gods. Darkseid and his army from Apokolips have attempted to invade Earth-0, or Prime Earth, but are repelled by the first incarnation of the Justice League. At the same time, his armies invaded the alternate Earth of Earth-2 under the aegis of Steppenwolf, which was much more successful.

The invasion of Earth-2 cost the lives of that universe's original Superman, Batman, Catwoman, Wonder Woman and millions of humans, including Earth-2's Lois Lane, who married Superman on that world. The Apokoliptan forces have assistance from Fury (Earth-2 Wonder Woman's abducted and brainwashed daughter), with all her mother's Amazonian abilities. Five years on, a number of new "wonders" begin to emerge: Green Lantern (Alan Scott), Atom, Hawkgirl, Doctor Fate, Red Tornado (an android with Lois Lane's consciousness) and the Flash form an embryonic Justice Society. Before long, the armies of Apokolips attempt a second invasion of Earth 2, and the Wonders of the World are supported by further heroes including Batman (Thomas Wayne), a new Superman (Val-Zod), Huntress (Helena Wayne), Power Girl, Aquawoman (Marella), the Accountable (Jimmy Olsen), Mister Miracle, and Mister Terrific.

Agents of Darkseid, such as Glorious Godfrey and Kalibak (in Batman & Robin) and the Apokoliptian Orion (in Wonder Woman), have encountered the heroes of Earth-0 on several occasions, but no full-scale invasions have taken place. Later, in the series Earth 2: Worlds' End, Mister Miracle discovers that Highfather made a deal with Darkseid that the armies of Apokolips could invade Earth-2 and that dimension freely without the intervention of the New Gods of New Genesis, explaining the wild disparity between the fates of Earth-0 and Earth-2. Ultimately, Apokolips itself enters Earth-2's Solar System and consumes Earth-2, transforming the planet into fuel to sustain itself.

=== DC Rebirth ===
When Perpetua destroys the Source Wall, one of the side effects is that Apokolips simply vanishes. With Apokolips gone, Darkseid plans to use the Ghost Sector to create a New Apokolips which he will use to invade and conquer the Multiverse.

== Inhabitants ==
The population is a downtrodden lot, including many kidnapped from other worlds before being "broken". The majority of the population are called Lowlies or Hunger Dogs, a bald and fearful race whose members have no sense of self-worth or value, and yet, in their own way, are just as much gods as those who rule the planet. The Lowlies are subject to constant abuse that ends only with death. Next are the Parademons, who serve as the keepers of order on the planet. Higher above the Parademons are the Female Furies, Darkseid's personal guard. They are either trained for their position in the Furies from birth, or are promoted from the ranks of general Apokoliptian troops. The leaders of the Furies are Granny Goodness and Kanto, with Kanto serving as Darkseid's master assassin. Deep below Armagetto, the lifeless forms of the Old Gods live on, known as the Dreggs. Apokolips is ruled by Darkseid, but delegates most matters to his counsellor DeSaad.

== Geography ==
- Armagedda – One of the many filth-strewn districts on Apokolips that is inhabited by Hunger Dogs and patrolled by Parademons.
- Armagetto – The planet's one city and capital home to a dangerous ghetto outside of Darkseid's palace.
- Darkseid's Palace – This is where Darkseid lives.
- The Garden of Hope – The Garden of Hope is a garden that is the only beautiful place on Apokolips. It is here where the precognitive Pythia resides and guards Darkseid's oracle. Darkseid tends to visit this area when he gets stressed out.
- Granny Goodness' Orphanage – A training facility where Granny Goodness trains the children of Apokolips to become mighty warriors. It is located in the Night-Time Zone of Armagetto.
- The Happiness Home – A rectangular fortress built on a solid rock base in the centre of a shallow crater. It is over 200 feet high and a training school of sorts.
- The Necropolis – An underground labyrinth located on Apokolips, home to the Dreggs, the last surviving Old Gods.
- The Terrorium

== Technology ==
Apokolips is on par with New Genesis in terms of technological advancement. With their technology, they are the height of power in most of the universe and are able to devastate galaxies when they choose to use it. Technology from Apokolips is sometimes on par with the technology used by Brainiac. Apokoliptian technology is furthermore the source of unparalleled misery in the universe, as the planet routinely arms evil groups with advanced technology to further its influence (and misery) across the universe. Apokoliptian technology was used by Bruno Mannheim and his organization Intergang in the Superman comics. It was a deal between Darkseid and Metron which was the cause of the invention of the "Boom Tube" using "Element X", which could only be found on Apokolips. The "Entropy Aegis" armor, used by Steel to defeat Imperiex, was Apokoliptian technology, as was Dmitri Pushkin's second suit of Rocket Red armor.

== Other versions ==
=== Darkseid/Galactus: The Hunger ===
During an intercompany crossover, Galactus visited Apokolips, but was unable to feed on the planet, since all of the life force that had dwelled there had either left to New Genesis or had been burned in the fire pits long ago, in essence leaving the planet with no life force and making it too corrupt for him to feed on.

== In other media ==
=== Television ===
- Apokolips appears in Super Friends.
- Apokolips appears in Superman: The Animated Series.
- Apokolips appears in the Justice League episode "Twilight".
- Apokolips appears in Justice League Unlimited. Following Darkseid's death, Granny Goodness and Virman Vundabar battle for control of the planet.
- Apokolips appears in the series finale of Smallville.
- Apokolips appears in Young Justice.
- Apokolips appears in Justice League Action.
- Apokolips appears in the Harley Quinn episode "Inner (Para) Demons".

=== Film ===
- Apokolips appears in Superman/Batman: Apocalypse.
- Apokolips appears in the DC Animated Movie Universe films Justice League: War, Reign of the Supermen, and Justice League Dark: Apokolips War.
- Apokolips appears in Zack Snyder's Justice League.

=== Video games ===
- Apokolips appears in Superman: Shadow of Apokolips.
- Apokolips appears in Justice League Heroes.
- Apokolips appears in DC Universe Online.
- Apokolips appears in Lego DC Super-Villains.
