= Lego DC Super-Villains =

2018 video game

- Developer: Traveller's Tales
- Publisher: Warner Bros. Interactive Entertainment
- Directors: Stephen Sharples; Andrew Holt
- Producer: David Geeson
- Designer: Arthur Parsons
- Programmer: Ben Klages
- Artist: David Hoye
- Composers: Simon Withenshaw; Ian Livingstone
- Platforms: Nintendo Switch; PlayStation 4; Windows; Xbox One; macOS
- Release: NA: 16 October 2018; WW: 19 October 2018; macOS: WW: 30 July 2019
- Genre: Action-adventure
- Modes: Single-player, multiplayer

Lego DC Super-Villains is a 2018 action-adventure game developed by Traveller's Tales and published by Warner Bros. Interactive Entertainment for the Xbox One, PlayStation 4, Nintendo Switch, and Microsoft Windows. Serving as a spin-off to the Lego Batman series, it focuses on the villains of the DC Universe, being the first game in the series to do so since the villain levels of Lego Batman: The Videogame. The game was released on 16 October 2018 in North America, and on 19 October worldwide. A macOS version of the game was released by Feral Interactive on 30 July 2019.

While the core gameplay follows the same style as past Lego titles, including the addition of a two-player cooperative multiplayer mode, DC Super-Villains is the first game to incorporate a fully customizable character into the story. The plot centers around the villains of the DC Universe who, in the aftermath of the Justice League's disappearance, reluctantly take on the role of Earth's protectors and must defeat a rival group of supervillains from another universe, who are masquerading as heroes.

== Gameplay ==
Lego DC Super-Villains is an action-adventure game played from a third-person perspective, alternating between action sequences and puzzle-solving scenarios.

=== Characters ===
Like previous titles from the Lego Batman series, such as DC Super Heroes and Beyond Gotham, players gain access to a roster of iconic characters from the DC Universe, each with their own unique abilities. DC Super-Villains stands out from other Lego video games by being the first to incorporate the use of a custom character, who becomes integrated with the game's story. Initially players devise their look, name, and style of fighting, but gain access to super-powers for their character to use as they progress in the story, along with unlocking new customisation options.

=== Setting ===
The game itself operates with the same level of gameplay mechanics from previous Lego video games, as well as elements from the Lego Batman trilogy. It focuses on a mixture of levels consisting of two modes – story and free roam – along with open-world elements in-between levels, featuring a selection of locations from the DC Universe, including condensed versions of Gotham City and Metropolis, as well as Smallville, Arkham Asylum, Apokolips, the Justice League Watchtower, Stryker's Island, the Hall of Justice, S.T.A.R. Labs, and Belle Reve; story levels feature other locations such as Gorilla City, Oa, Themyscira, and Nanda Parbat.

== Plot ==
Following the capture of a super-powered individual dubbed "The Rookie", Commissioner Gordon oversees their transfer to Stryker's Island in Metropolis. As the Rookie possesses a previously unseen ability to absorb energy to gain new super-powers, Gordon offers the incarcerated Lex Luthor a reduced prison sentence in exchange for monitoring the Rookie and assessing their potential threat. Before he can agree to the deal, Luthor's bodyguard Mercy Graves arrives to break him and the Rookie out of prison, and the trio escape alongside several other imprisoned villains, though they are pursued by the Justice League. Meanwhile, the Joker and Harley Quinn steal several items from Wayne Tech, with Batman giving chase. The combined group of villains are defeated by the sudden arrival of the "Justice Syndicate", a superhero team from a parallel universe, with only a few escaping. Before departing, Harley witnesses the Syndicate forcibly warp the Justice League away.

The Syndicate claim that the Justice League are on an off-world mission and that they are their replacements, with the group's leader Ultraman posing as reporter Kent Clarkson to feed further false information to the public. Suspicious of the Syndicate, Luthor begins uniting a massive force of villains to expose the truth and defeat the Syndicate so they may take over. Lois Lane and Jimmy Olsen also begin their own independent investigation. During their research, the villains discover the Justice Syndicate is actually the "Crime Syndicate", the Justice League's villainous counterparts from Earth-3, and that they are searching for something on Earth, using their superhero personas to gain easy access to classified information and locations. Once they recruit Gorilla Grodd, Sinestro, and Black Adam, the united Legion of Doom launches an attack on the Crime Syndicate on top of LexCorp, but Luthor betrays everyone, planning to use the Syndicate's technology to be rid of them all in order to rule the Earth alone. Furious at Luthor's betrayal, the Rookie tries to stop him by blasting the machine with energy, causing it to malfunction and teleport everyone to random locations while bringing Apokolips near Earth.

As the Syndicate tries to maintain order on Earth, the Joker, Harley, and the Rookie find themselves on Apokolips and encounter Darkseid, the Syndicate's secret master who ordered them to search the Earth for the last piece of the Anti-Life Equation. As Darkseid discovers them, the villains are rescued by the Justice League, who have just escaped their imprisonment on Apokolips. Escaping Darkseid's forces, the group learn the Syndicate has fooled the people of Earth into believing the Justice League have become evil, prompting the League to form an uneasy alliance with the Legion of Doom to defeat them.

After gathering more forces, the alliance tricks Johnny Quick into revealing the Syndicate's plans on camera. Lois broadcasts the footage worldwide, turning the public against the Syndicate. As the alliance defeats and sends the Syndicate back to Earth-3, Batman discovers the last piece of the Equation to have been inside a Mother Box, which Harley stole from Wayne Tech and which the Rookie inadvertently absorbed while sending the Syndicate to Earth-3. Learning that Darkseid is sending his forces to Earth, the alliance attempts to protect the Rookie, but they are captured and taken to Apokolips, forcing the League and the Legion to mount a rescue mission. While the Rookie is saved, Darkseid absorbs the last piece of the Equation; however, it proves ineffective, as it was altered by the physiology of the Rookie, who is revealed to also hail from Earth-3.

After the Rookie uses the Equation to defeat Darkseid and alter his and his forces' psyches, making them kind, Luthor betrays the group again and attempts to abandon them on Apokolips. His plan fails as the alliance restores Apokolips to its original location and returns to Earth, where they confront Luthor. The Rookie is then given a choice to join the Justice League as a hero, or continue working for the Legion of Doom as a villain. If the player chooses to have the Rookie join the League, Luthor expresses disappointment at their betrayal, only for the Joker to remind Luthor of his attempt to trap them on Apokolips. The villains then escape as the League, including the Rookie, prepare to pursue them. Alternatively, if the Rookie sides with the Legion, Batman will lament that his suspicions about the Rookie were right, before the villains escape to resume their criminal activities.

In a post-credits scene, the Anti-Monitor arrives on Apokolips to find its occupants still under the effect of the Rookie's powers, where he proceeds to attack Darkseid, disgusted at his kindness.

== Development ==
The game was leaked by Walmart Canada in May 2018. Warner Bros. Interactive Entertainment announced the title officially on 30 May 2018. Game director Arthur Parsons revealed that the concept of a supervillain-themed game dates back to 2008's Lego Batman: The Videogame, which featured levels based on the villains' point of view in the story.

=== Voice acting ===
The game's voice work was directed by Liam O'Brien. In an interview with IGN, Arthur Parsons described the game's cast as being composed of "All-Star" actors and the best one out of all the Lego games he has worked on. Lego DC Super-Villains is the first Lego video game since Lego Dimensions (2015) to have original voice acting performed by actors who are affiliated with the Screen Actors Guild‐American Federation of Television and Radio Artists (SAG-AFTRA) following the conclusion of the 2016–17 video game voice actor strike. Like Lego Batman 3: Beyond Gotham, the cast consists of a number of actors reprising roles from various DC properties; noticeable additions include Michael Ironside reprising his role as Darkseid for the first time since the Justice League Unlimited series finale "Destroyer", which aired in 2006, Zachary Levi reprising his role as the titular character from the Shazam! film to coincide with the release of the Shazam! DLC packs, and Greg Miller providing the voice of Polka-Dot Man.

=== Downloadable content ===
The game features a Deluxe Edition, which grants players who purchased it access to season pass content. The season pass consists of levels based on other DC media franchises – two based on the 2018 film Aquaman, one based on the 1993 animated film Batman: Mask of the Phantasm, two based on the 2019 film Shazam!, and one based on the 2013 Young Justice animated series episode "Summit". It also contains character packs, including the "DC Super Heroes: TV Series DLC Character Pack" and "DC Super-Villains: TV Series DLC Character Pack", both consisting of characters from The CW's Arrowverse television programs; the "Justice League Dark Character Pack"; and the "DC Movies Character Pack", a pack consisting of characters from the DC Extended Universe.

== Reception ==
Reception

Aggregate score
Aggregator	Score
Metacritic	(PC) 76/100 (PS4) 74/100 (XONE) 72/100 (NS) 75/100

Review scores
Publication	Score
Game Informer	8.5/10
GameSpot	5/10
IGN	7.8/10
Metro	6/10

The Nintendo Switch and PC versions of Lego DC Super-Villains received "generally favorable" reviews, while the PlayStation 4 and Xbox One versions received "mixed or average" reviews, according to Metacritic. Reviewers praised the game's story, humor, and voice acting, while criticising its similar gameplay to previous Lego games.

=== Accolades ===
Year	Award	Category	Result	Ref.
2018	Game Critics Awards	Best Family/Social Game	Nominated	
2018	Gamescom Awards	Best Family Game	Nominated	
2018	Gamescom Awards	Best Console Game (Nintendo Switch)	Nominated	
2019	New York Game Awards	Central Park Children's Zoo Award for Best Kids Game	Nominated	
2019	D.I.C.E. Awards	Family Game of the Year	Nominated	
2019	National Academy of Video Game Trade Reviewers Awards	Direction in a Game Cinema	Nominated	
2019	National Academy of Video Game Trade Reviewers Awards	Game, Franchise Family	Nominated	
2019	National Academy of Video Game Trade Reviewers Awards	Performance in a Comedy, Supporting (Tara Strong)	Won	
2019	National Academy of Video Game Trade Reviewers Awards	Writing in a Comedy	Nominated	
2019	British Academy Children's Awards	Game	Nominated	
