= List of Batman: The Brave and the Bold episodes =

The following is an episode list for Batman: The Brave and the Bold, an American animated television series based in part on the DC Comics series The Brave and the Bold which features two or more superheroes coming together to solve a crime or foil a supervillain. As the title suggests, the cartoon focuses on Batman's "team-ups" with various heroes, similar to the original comic book series but different from the current one which features team-ups between various heroes. The series premiered on November 14, 2008, on Cartoon Network, and ended on November 18, 2011.

== Series overview ==
Season	Episodes	Originally released	
Season	Episodes	First released	Last released
1	26	November 14, 2008	November 13, 2009
2	26	November 20, 2009	April 8, 2011
3	13	March 25, 2011	November 18, 2011
Film		January 6, 2018	

== Episodes ==
=== Season 1 (2008–09) ===
Episodes are listed in order by production code, for the order by air date, see television order.

No. overall	No. in season	Title	Directed by	Written by	Original release date	Prod. code	TV order
1	1	"The Rise of the Blue Beetle!"	Ben Jones	Michael Jelenic	November 14, 2008	345541	S01E01
Teaser: Batman and Green Arrow escape from the Clock King's deathtrap. Main plot: Batman and Blue Beetle go on a mission to destroy an asteroid heading for a space station, only to be transported to another planet. There, the two battle Kanjar Ro, who is harnessing the native Gibble aliens for power.
2	2	"Terror on Dinosaur Island!"	Brandon Vietti	Steven Melching	November 21, 2008	345542	S01E02
Teaser: Batman and Plastic Man fight Gentleman Ghost during his crime spree in the Day of the Dead festival and get help from Fire. Main plot: When Gorilla Grodd creates a machine on Dinosaur Island that will turn humans into nonhuman primates, it's up to Batman and Plastic Man to save the day.
3	3	"Evil Under the Sea!"	Michael Chang	Joseph Kuhr	December 5, 2008	345543	S01E03
Teaser: Batman and Atom fight to prevent Felix Faust from opening Pandora's box. Main plot: Batman investigates seismic activity and pays a visit to Aquaman, who is unaware that his brother Orm is conspiring with Black Manta to conquer Atlantis. Aquaman and Batman team up to battle Black Manta.
4	4	"Day of the Dark Knight!"	Ben Jones	J.M. DeMatteis	January 2, 2009	345544	S01E05
Teaser: Batman is summoned to keep an eye on Guy Gardner, and must help him and the Green Lantern Corps stop a K'Vellian prisoner that he accidentally turned into a monster. Main plot: After thwarting a prison break at Iron Heights Prison, Batman and Green Arrow are brought to medieval times by Merlin to help stop Morgaine le Fey when she overthrows King Arthur. It won't be easy when Morgaine has control of Merlin's slave: Etrigan the Demon.
5	5	"Invasion of the Secret Santas!"	Brandon Vietti	Adam Beechen	December 12, 2008	345545	S01E04
Teaser: Batman and Blue Beetle fight the Sportsmaster when he crashes a Christmas bowling tournament. Main plot: Batman teams up with the Red Tornado to battle Fun Haus, who plans to ruin Christmas for everyone with his army of toys.
6	6	"Enter the Outsiders!"	Michael Chang	Todd Casey	January 9, 2009	345546	S01E06
Teaser: Batman teams up with B'wana Beast to take on Black Manta when he robs an armored car. Main plot: Batman joins forces with his old mentor Wildcat to take down three superpowered teenagers known as the Outsiders (Black Lightning, Katana, and Metamorpho) who are being influenced by Slug, a deformed crime boss.
7	7	"Dawn of the Dead Man!"	Ben Jones	Steven Melching	January 16, 2009	345547	S01E07
Teaser: Batman joins forces with Kamandi and his companion Dr. Canus to secure some antibiotics while evading a group of Rat Men. Main plot: After being buried alive by Gentleman Ghost, Batman uses a special meditation to leave his body and has an encounter with Deadman. With some tricks learned by Deadman, Batman has Green Arrow and Speedy dig out his body before it runs out of air so they can stop Gentleman Ghost from raising an army of the dead.
8	8	"Fall of the Blue Beetle!"	Brandon Vietti	Jim Krieg	January 23, 2009	345548	S01E08
Teaser: In flashbacks, Batman and Blue Beetle (Ted Kord) try to regain the scarab from Jarvis Kord. Main plot: Two years later, Blue Beetle (Jaime Reyes) researches his roots following Batman's battle with Doctor Polaris. This leads him to Hub City and the lair of the Blue Beetle. Using Ted's Bug vehicle, Jaime finds himself on Science Island where he encounters Jarvis Kord, who is posing as Ted Kord. He asks the Beetle to activate an army of peaceful robots. His true goal is to put an end to wars by conquering the Earth.
9	9	"Journey to the Center of the Bat!"	Michael Chang	Matt Wayne	January 30, 2009	345549	S01E09
Teaser: Elongated Man and Plastic Man team up with Batman to capture Baby Face during a bank heist. Main plot: When Batman is stricken down by a disease during a fight with Chemo (who is being controlled by Brain), the Atom must miniaturize himself and travel with Aquaman into Batman's body to cure him.
10	10	"The Eyes of Despero!"	Ben Jones	J.M. DeMatteis	February 6, 2009	345550	S01E10
Teaser: Batman and Doctor Fate must stop Wotan from breaking into the Library of Infinity. Main plot: After defeating Cavalier, Batman teams up with the last members of the Green Lantern Corps (Guy Gardner, G'nort, and Sinestro) when alien dictator Despero plans to mind control Mogo and use him to conquer the universe.
11	11	"Return of the Fearsome Fangs!"	Brandon Vietti	Todd Casey	February 20, 2009	345551	S01E11
Teaser: In the Wild West, Batman teams up with Jonah Hex to stop the Royal Flush Gang. Main plot: After stopping Top's bank robbery, Batman joins forces with Bronze Tiger to stop the Terrible Trio from stealing a powerful ancient totem from the Wudang Temple in China.
12	12	"Deep Cover for Batman!"	Michael Chang	Joseph Kuhr	February 27, 2009	345552	S01E12
Teaser: Red Hood tries to escape to a parallel Earth with the Phase Oscillator, but is thwarted by the Injustice Syndicate. Main plot: To infiltrate the Injustice Syndicate of a parallel Earth, Batman takes the place of his villainous counterpart Owlman (whom Batman defeated and imprisoned in the Batcave's cell). He infiltrates the Injustice Syndicate and gains the unlikely alliance of Red Hood and heroic counterparts of villains.
13	13	"Game Over for Owlman!"	Ben Jones	Joseph Kuhr	March 6, 2009	345553	S01E13
Teaser: A recap of the first part is shown, followed by Batman's escape from the police. Main plot: On Earth, Owlman has broken free from the Batcave's cell and has stolen Batman's original costume and is committing crimes with help from all of the villains (namely Black Manta, Brain, Clock King, Doctor Polaris, Gentleman Ghost, and Gorilla Grodd). Batman, returned from the parallel earth, is now hunted by his friends. When Owlman decides to use the heroes as hostages to regain the Phase Oscillator, Batman must team up with his archnemesis, the Joker and save them before it's too late.
14	14	"Mystery In Space!"	Brandon Vietti	Jim Krieg	March 13, 2009	345554	S01E14
Teaser: Batman rescues the Question and Gorilla Grodd from the mysterious Equinox. During the chase, Equinox escapes and promises they will meet again. Main plot: Aquaman (depressed after being unable to stop a beluga whale hunt in the Bering Sea) accompanies Batman to the planet Rann to help space hero Adam Strange stop the Gordanian general Kreegar from obtaining the Eye of Zared and destroying Rann.
15	15	"Trials of the Demon!"	Michael Chang	Todd Casey	March 20, 2009	345555	S01E15
Teaser: Batman and Flash stop the Scarecrow and the Scream Queen on Halloween night. Main plot: After thwarting Crazy Quilt's art robbery, Batman is summoned to 19th century London by Etrigan's human host Jason Blood, who has been framed for a series of crimes committed by Jim Craddock, who is stealing souls to gain immortality from Astaroth. Etrigan and Batman are aided in their investigations by the legendary Sherlock Holmes and Dr. Watson.
16	16	"Night of the Huntress!"	Ben Jones	Adam Beechen	May 8, 2009	345556	S01E16
Teaser: Batman and Black Canary team up to battle Solomon Grundy and his gang at a science lab. Main plot: With the help of Blue Beetle and Huntress, Batman fights the criminal activities of Baby Face and his wife Mrs. Manface when they free their old gang from Blackgate Penitentiary. Meanwhile, Blue Beetle develops a crush on Huntress.
17	17	"Menace of the Conqueror Caveman!"	Brandon Vietti	Matt Wayne	May 15, 2009	345557	S01E17
Teaser: Batman and Wildcat work together to stop Bane. Main plot: Coming from the 25th century, Booster Gold travels back in time to join Batman and become a celebrity hero. In his quest for fame following Batman stopping Punch and Jewelee's bank robbery, he unwittingly enables the immortal tyrant Kru'll the Eternal to carry out his nefarious plot when Kru'll kidnaps Booster Gold's robot Skeets.
18	18	"The Color of Revenge!"	Michael Chang	Todd Casey	May 22, 2009	345558	S01E18
Teaser: In the past, Batman and Robin foil Crazy Quilt's plot to rob an art museum. Main plot: In the present, Batman and Robin once again team up, but it's different since Robin left Batman. When Crazy Quilt gets revenge on Robin for blinding him, it's up to the Dynamic Duo to save the day once again.
19	19	"Legends of the Dark Mite!"	Ben Jones	Paul Dini	May 29, 2009	345559	S01E19
Teaser: Batman teams up with his dog Ace the Bat-Hound to stop Catman from auctioning a Sumatran Tiger in the jungle. Main plot: Bat-Mite, Batman's biggest fan from the 5th dimension, pops up and kidnaps him in an attempt to make him a better hero.
20	20	"Hail the Tornado Tyrant!"	Brandon Vietti	J.M. DeMatteis	June 5, 2009	345560	S01E20
Teaser: Batman and Green Arrow work together to thwart the Joker's auto-homicide robbery until it is interrupted by Catwoman. Main plot: Feeling lonely, Red Tornado builds a son named Tornado Champion that has the one thing he lacks: human emotion. The experiment however goes haywire when Major Disaster appears, and the Champion is reborn as the Tornado Tyrant.
21	21	"Duel of the Double Crossers!"	Michael Chang	Todd Casey	June 12, 2009	345561	S01E21
Teaser: Batman trains the Outsiders by putting them through a simulation where Despero is attacking the city. Main plot: Mongul saves Jonah Hex's life but then forces Hex to work as his bounty hunter to recruit soldiers for his Warworld. When he crosses paths with Batman following his fight with Zebra-Man, Hex captures Batman and reveals that he is working off a debt that will allow him to return to his own time. On Warworld, Batman fights Steppenwolf and other aliens in Mongul's gladiator arena. Hex also has encounters with Mongul's sister Mongal and her fighters Lashina and Stompa. He and Batman try to free the aliens.
22	22	"Last Bat on Earth!"	Ben Jones	Steven Melching	June 19, 2009	345562	S01E22
Teaser: Batman teams up with Mister Miracle and Big Barda to help with a daredevil charity event. Main plot: Batman chases Gorilla Grodd into the future (who used the technology of Professor Carter Nichols) and teams up with Kamandi to stop him. When Grodd takes over leadership of the Gorilla Men from Ramjam, Batman tries to convince Tuftan's father Great Caesar to help fight him.
23	23	"When OMAC Attacks!"	Brandon Vietti	Stan Berkowitz	October 16, 2009	345563	S01E23
Teaser: Hawk and Dove assist Batman in stopping an intergalactic war between the Controllers and the Warlords of Okaara. Main plot: After Batman's mission to stop the villainous Doctor Kafka goes awry, Equinox manipulates the metal man Shrapnel into attacking a city, but Batman and Global Peace Agency operative OMAC team up to stop him.
24	24	"Mayhem of the Music Meister!"	Ben Jones	Michael Jelenic	October 23, 2009	345564	S01E24
Teaser: The Music Meister and his orchestra introduce the episode in the manner of a real musical. Main plot: The Music Meister uses his power to control people with music to try to take over the world and it's up to Batman, Black Canary, Aquaman and Green Arrow to stop him. Special Guest Star: Neil Patrick Harris as the Music Meister.
25	25	"Inside the Outsiders!"	Brandon Vietti	Alexx Van Dyne	November 6, 2009	345565	S01E25
Teaser: Batman and Green Arrow retrieve two golden cat statues from Catwoman. Even though her henchmen are defeated, Catwoman escapes. Main plot: Upon learning that the Outsiders have gone missing, Batman goes up against Psycho-Pirate to stop him from converting their emotional weaknesses into his strength.
26	26	"The Fate of Equinox!"	Michael Chang	Joseph Kuhr	November 13, 2009	345566	S01E26
Teaser: Batman takes on Two-Face only to later team-up with him against his henchmen after Two-Face's coin lands on heads during his coin toss. Main plot: Equinox tries to remake the universe in his own image using the powers of the Lords of Chaos and Order as Batman and Doctor Fate work together with other heroes to stop him.

=== Season 2 (2009–11) ===
Episodes are listed in order by production code; for the order by air date, see television order.

No. overall	No. in season	Title	Directed by	Written by	Original release date	Prod. code	TV order
27	1	"Death Race to Oblivion!"	Ben Jones	Jim Krieg	November 20, 2009	201	S02E01
Teaser: When a child genius drinks a formula turning him into Blockbuster and then invades a museum to steal a diamond, Batman and Captain Marvel team up to stop him. Main plot: Mongul forces heroes (Batman, Green Arrow, Guy Gardner, Huntress, Plastic Man, and Woozy Winks) and villains (Black Manta, Catwoman, Gentleman Ghost, and Joker) alike to race against Steppenwolf for Earth's survival.
28	2	"Long Arm of the Law!"	Michael Chang	J.M. DeMatteis	December 11, 2009	202	S02E02
Teaser: Batman and Plastic Man rescue some boy scouts from a group of sleeping Shaggy Men, until Plastic Man awakens them. Main plot: Kite Man plans revenge on Plastic Man for putting him to jail after years working for him as one of his henchmen. With a new sidekick named Rubberneck, Kite Man threatens Plastic Man's family, including his wife Ramona, his son Baby Plas, and his sidekick Woozy Winks, and also plans to remove his powers. Note: Baby Plas is originally from The Plastic Man Comedy/Adventure Show.
29	3	"Revenge of the Reach!"	Michael Goguen	Greg Weisman	January 1, 2010	203	S02E03
Teaser: Batman helps the Challengers of the Unknown in a fight against a giant spider on Dinosaur Island. Later, after Batman leaves, the team of heroes are ambushed by Starro clones that came from the crashed meteorite. Main plot: Following a fight with Evil Star, Batman and Blue Beetle face off against an alien race called the Reach with the help of the Green Lantern Corps. It turns out that Blue Beetle's scarab is linked to the Reach as revealed by the Guardians of the Universe.
30	4	"Aquaman's Outrageous Adventure!"	Ben Jones	Steven Melching	January 8, 2010	204	S02E04
Teaser: Over the battlefields of World War I, Batman calls upon Enemy Ace to help destroy a piece of alien artillery. Main plot: After defeating Fisherman, Aquaman goes on vacation with his wife Mera and his son Arthur Jr. However, they stop along the way when Aquaman helps other heroes. One of the stops involves saving Batman from the Penguin.
31	5	"The Golden Age of Justice!"	Michael Chang	Todd Casey	January 15, 2010	205	S02E05
Teaser: In an Agatha Christie type mystery, Batman and Detective Chimp join forces to find out who swiped the Golden Skull and discover that one of the suspects is actually False-Face. Main plot: An aging Justice Society of America (consisting of Black Canary, Doctor Mid-Nite, Flash (Jay Garrick), Hawkman, Hourman, and Wildcat) is faced with the return of their enemy Per Degaton as he returns from suspended animation to enact a plan for world domination with his assistant Professor Zee. Meanwhile, Black Canary helps Wildcat face his greatest regrets, namely the death of the first Black Canary.
32	6	"Sidekicks Assemble!"	Michael Goguen	Dean Stefan	January 22, 2010	206	S02E06
Teaser: In a flashback, the younger Robin, Speedy, and Aqualad, face off against multiple villains in a simulation in the Watchtower while Batman, Aquaman, and Green Arrow watch. Main plot: In the present, Robin, Speedy, and Aqualad, have had it with being bossed around by Batman, Green Arrow, and Aquaman, and demand a piece of the action. They get more than they bargained for when the three sidekicks find themselves facing off against Ra's al Ghul and his daughter Talia al Ghul on a flying island.
33	7	"Clash of the Metal Men!"	Ben Jones	Thomas Pugsley	January 29, 2010	207	S02E07
Teaser: After helping Batman defeat a gang of pirates, Aquaman returns to Atlantis to find it overtaken by Starro clones. There he meets the Faceless Hunter who is preparing for Starro's invasion. Main plot: During a battle with Chemo, Batman is introduced to a team of energetic androids known as the Metal Men. When their creator Will Magnus goes missing at the hands of the Gas Gang, Batman and the Metal Men team up to track them down.
34	8	"A Bat Divided!"	Michael Chang	Marsha F. Griffin	February 5, 2010	208	S02E08
Teaser: Booster Gold and Skeets end up on the Riddler's game show "Riddle Me This" and are forced to answer riddles for the fate of Batman. Main plot: Doctor Double X battles Batman and causes a meltdown at a nuclear plant in an attempt to increase his own power. The resulting explosion splits Batman into three emotionally unstable personas. Student Jason Rusch and his teacher Ronnie Raymond, who are visiting the plant on a field trip, are fused into the superhero Firestorm in the same explosion and help Batman pull himself together.
35	9	"The Super-Batman of Planet X!"	Michael Goguen	Adam Beechen	March 26, 2010	209	S02E09
Teaser: Will Magnus and the Metal Men team up with Batman to take down Kanjar Ro and his gang of intergalactic space bandits. Main plot: Green Arrow assists Batman in defeating the remaining space pirates, but during a chase, a wormhole is created and it sends Batman to the distant planet Zur-En-Arrh. There he meets his doppelganger, the Batman of Zur-En-Arrh, but more surprisingly, on this planet the Caped Crusader has superpowers. Together, they battle the mad genius Rohtul who soon learns Batman's super weakness.
36	10	"The Power of Shazam!"	Ben Jones	Steven Melching	April 2, 2010	210	S02E10
Teaser: The Faceless Hunter is shown fighting and putting several heroes under Starro's control preparing for a full-scale invasion. Main plot: Batman teams up with Captain Marvel to battle Doctor Sivana and Black Adam when they wish to usurp the magic of Shazam that gives Marvel's alter ego, Billy Batson, his power. Note: The episode's plot pays homage to various stories. The episode's title is a reference to the homonymous comic book title starring Captain Marvel in the 1990s. Sivana's plan to silence the radiocommunications is similar to his first appearance in Whiz Comics #2 (1940). Sivana transforming himself using Captain Marvel's power is a homage to the story in DC Comics Presents Annual #3 (1984).
37	11	"Chill of the Night!"	Michael Chang	Paul Dini	April 9, 2010	211	S02E11
Teaser: Abra Kadabra attempts to steal the contents of a museum celebrating history's greatest magicians, when Batman brings his old friend Zatanna to thwart him and his army of mind controlled slaves. Main plot: The Spectre and the Phantom Stranger make a bet on Bruce Wayne's soul, concerning how he will deal with the information of the man who killed his parents, Thomas Wayne and Martha Wayne. After decades of searching, Batman finds the culprit is Joe Chill, who is auctioning a powerful weapon to Batman's rogues. Special Guest Stars: Adam West as Thomas Wayne, Julie Newmar as Martha Wayne, Kevin Conroy as the Phantom Stranger, Mark Hamill as the Spectre, and Richard Moll as Lew Moxon.
38	12	"Gorillas In Our Midst!"	Michael Goguen	Todd Casey	April 16, 2010	212	S02E12
Teaser: Professor Milo designs a way to control rats, and uses his new technology to steal diamonds only to run afoul of Batman and the Spectre. Main plot: When Gorilla Grodd, Monsieur Mallah, and Gorilla Boss form G.A.S.P. (short for Gorillas and Apes Seizing Power) and replace Gotham City's population with gorillas, Batman teams with Detective Chimp, B'wana Beast, and Vixen to thwart Grodd's plans.
39	13	"The Siege of Starro! Part One"	Ben Jones	Joseph Kuhr	September 17, 2010	213	S02E14
Teaser: A voiceover explains how there have always been heroes to defeat villains throughout history. A montage of history is shown, which includes Anthro fighting Kru'll the Eternal, Etrigan fighting Morgaine le Fey, Jonah Hex and Cinnamon fighting the Royal Flush Gang, the Justice Society fighting Per Degaton's army, and Batman fighting Ra's al Ghul. Meanwhile, Guy Gardner, Kilowog and several others battle Starro-controlled Green Lanterns in space. Main plot: With most of Earth's heroes under the control of Starro, Batman and Booster Gold team up with Firestorm, B'wana Beast, and Captain Marvel to battle the Faceless Hunter and thwart Starro's invasion.
40	14	"The Siege of Starro! Part Two"	Michael Goguen	Joseph Kuhr	September 24, 2010	215	S02E13
Teaser: A recap of the first part is shown, followed by B'wana Beast's origin story. Main plot: Starro may be defeated, but the Faceless Hunter is not. The alien warrior forces B'wana Beast to combine the Starro parasites into a monster that he plans to use to destroy Earth. But Batman has his own back-up plan, in the form of the Metal Men to rescue him.
41	15	"Requiem for a Scarlet Speedster!"	Michael Chang	Greg Weisman	October 1, 2010	214	S02E15
Teaser: Batman and the Outsiders thwart Kobra's plan of global domination and his army of cultists. Main plot: Two years ago, Barry Allen and Batman worked together to save themselves from villains like Gorilla Grodd, Captain Boomerang, and Mirror Master. Two years later, the Rogues (consisting of Heat Wave, Weather Wizard and Captain Cold), Jay Garrick, and Kid Flash are depressed over Barry Allen's apparent death when he was pursuing Professor Zoom. However, after seeing the mysterious ghost of Barry Allen, Batman and the two Flashes use the cosmic treadmill to travel to the 25th century, where Zoom has taken over as the conqueror. Special Guest Star: John Wesley Shipp as Professor Zoom. Shipp previously portrayed Barry Allen in 1990's The Flash.
42	16	"The Last Patrol!"	Ben Jones	J.M. DeMatteis	October 8, 2010	216	S02E16
Teaser: In a flashback, Batgirl debuts as she saves Batman from Killer Moth. In the present, they are captured by the Penguin. Main plot: The Doom Patrol (consisting of the Chief, Elasti-Girl, Negative Man, and Robotman) comes out of retirement when General Zahl, Brain, Monsieur Mallah, Animal-Vegetable-Mineral Man, Arsenal, and Mutant Master work together in an attempt to kill them.
43	17	"The Mask of Matches Malone!"	Michael Chang	Gail Simone	December 5, 2011 (on iTunes)	217	S02E18
Teaser: Batman joins forces with Black Orchid as they both fight the seductive, but dangerous, Poison Ivy, along with her henchwomen. Main plot: Black Canary and Huntress, along with Catwoman, pursue Two-Face. At the same time, Batman (in his Matches Malone persona) gets amnesia and believes himself to be a gangster. This episode features the musical number "Birds of Prey". Note: The original version of the episode had Huntress holding up her index finger and waving it while talking about Aquaman's fish; an alternate version was prepared to show a fishtank behind Huntress and Black Canary. The episode was left out of the season 2 part 2 DVD volume. It was later included on the complete season 3 DVD as a bonus feature.
44	18	"Menace of the Madniks!"	Michael Goguen	Jim Krieg	October 15, 2010	218	S02E20
Teaser: Batman teams up with the Haunted Tank to fight Ma Murder and her gang. Main plot: Following a fight with the Madniks, Booster Gold misses his late old friend Ted Kord, so he travels back in time to hang with him. His time traveling soon changes the present when the effects of the Quark Pistol that Booster Gold destroyed cause the Madniks to become energy-draining monsters.
45	19	"Emperor Joker!"	Ben Jones	Steven Melching	October 22, 2010	219	S02E19
Teaser: From the files of the Bat-Computer, Batman and Robin battle Firefly and his Rainbow Creature in a homage to Detective Comics #241 and Batman #134. Main plot: After Batman defeats Ten-Eyed Man during a jewelry theft, Bat-Mite gives his powers to the Joker by mistake. He uses his new gifts to remake the world in his own image and begins repeatedly killing and reviving Batman. At the same time, Bat-Mite develops a crush on Harley Quinn and vice versa.
46	20	"The Criss Cross Conspiracy!"	Michael Chang	Marsha F. Griffin	October 30, 2010	220	S02E17
Teaser: Batman and the Atom end up fighting Bug-Eyed Bandit and gain the unexpected help of Aquaman. Main plot: The Bat Lady comes out of retirement when she sees an opportunity for revenge against the Riddler for humiliating her ten years ago during his fight with Batman and Robin in which he unmasked her. To get back at him, she hires the sorcerer Felix Faust to swap her body with that of Batman following his fights with Spinner and Tiger Shark. Batman brings Nightwing and Batgirl to help out.They soon realise that something is wrong with Batman and uncover the scheme.
47	21	"The Plague of the Prototypes!"	Michael Goguen	Dean Stefan	November 5, 2010	221	S02E21
Teaser: Batman travels back to World War II and fights alongside Sgt. Rock and G.I. Robot. Main plot: When Batman is on call with Green Arrow to take out aliens who ships are disguised as meteors, Gotham is kept safe by his squad of trusty Bat-Robots. But when Black Mask reprograms the Bat-Robots to do his bidding, Batman and Ace the Bat-Hound must blow the dust off his bumbling beta-test robot "Proto" to help him stop him. Special Guest Star: Adam West as Proto.
48	22	"Cry Freedom Fighters!"	Ben Jones	Thomas Pugsley and Steven Melching	November 12, 2010	222	S02E22
Teaser: Stargirl ends up teaming up with Blue Beetle to fight Mantis when Batman is busy. Main plot: The Supreme Chairman of Qward attempts to invade Earth with his forces and it is up to the Freedom Fighters (consisting of Uncle Sam, Doll Man, Black Condor, Human Bomb, Ray, and Phantom Lady), Batman, and a patriotic Plastic Man to save the day. Note: Plastic Man was only short-lived in Freedom Fighters in comics. Freedom Fighters are based on Quality Comics heroes bought by DC Comics in the end of the 1950s.
49	23	"The Knights of Tomorrow!"	Michael Chang	Todd Casey and Jake Black	November 19, 2010	223	S02E23
Teaser: The Question, under Batman's guidance, dodges Kalibak and the Parademons on Apokolips when gathering information on Darkseid's plans to invade Earth. Main plot: In Batman's future, Batman retires and marries Catwoman with whom he has a son named Damian Wayne while Dick Grayson becomes the new Batman. When a new Joker who claims to be the old Joker's son surfaces, a reluctant Damian assumes the mantle of Robin to stop them. It turns out that the events of the episode were part of a book that Alfred Pennyworth was writing.
50	24	"Darkseid Descending!"	Michael Goguen	Paul Giacoppo	December 3, 2010	224	S02E24
Teaser: Batman helps Firestorm take down Ronnie Raymond's crazed superpowered ex-girlfriend Killer Frost when she crashes his class. Main plot: Batman assembles the Justice League International (consisting of Blue Beetle, Booster Gold, Guy Gardner, Aquaman, Martian Manhunter, Fire and Ice) to prepare for the invasion of Darkseid.
51	25	"Bat-Mite Presents: Batman's Strangest Cases!"	Ben Jones	Paul Dini	April 1, 2011	225	S02E25
Teaser: A recreation of the Mad magazine parody "Bat Boy and Rubin", as the title characters try to solve a wave of murders. Main plot: Bat-Mite hosts a look at two other incarnations of Batman: A version referencing Jiro Kuwata's Batman featured in Bat-Manga!: The Secret History of Batman in Japan, in which Batman and Robin take on Lord Death Man; A crossover featuring Scooby-Doo and the Mystery Inc. gang, who assist the Dynamic Duo in rescuing "Weird Al" Yankovic from the Joker and Penguin.
52	26	"The Malicious Mr. Mind!"	Michael Chang and Michael Goguen	Dani Michaeli	April 8, 2011	226	S02E26
Teaser: Batman, Kamandi, and Dr. Canus battle Misfit in modern day Gotham City while searching for the ancient artifact that they need to beat him. Main plot: Batman and the Marvel Family (consisting of Captain Marvel, Mary Marvel, and Captain Marvel Jr.) battle the Monster Society of Evil (consisting of Doctor Sivana, Mister Atom, Kru'll the Eternal, Ibac, Oom the Mighty, Jeepers, and an unnamed Crocodile-Man), but the villains escape after Doctor Sivana blasts Batman with an age-reversing ray. The Marvel Family tries to figure out how to get Batman back to normal while also dealing with the Society, who are now being led by Mister Mind. Note: The Monster Society of Evil was a supervillain team from Fawcett Comics and later DC Comics. Oom was originally a villain of the Spectre and only joined the Society in the 1980s.

=== Season 3 (2011) ===
Episodes are listed in order by production code; for the order by air date see television order.

No. overall	No. in season	Title	Directed by	Written by	Original release date	Prod. code	TV order
53	1	"Battle of the Superheroes!"	Ben Jones	Jim Krieg	March 25, 2011	301	S03E01
Teaser: From the files of the Bat-Computer, Batman and Robin fight King Tut while wearing a special mummified uniform as Vicki Vale watches and take photographs. Main plot: Lex Luthor sends a red Kryptonite necklace to Lois Lane, causing Superman to be infected and become evil. Now Batman must work with Krypto to hold off Superman until the effects of the Red Kryptonite wear off. At the end of the show, The World's Finest stop an alien invasion and are honoured by America. Note: The Main plot is a homage to Silver Age Superman stories and mythology: Jimmy Olsen and his signal watch, Lois Lane with her Silver Age haircut and wedding dreams about Superman, Luthor as a fat evil scientist, Krypto the superdog, Red Kryptonite, the embottled city of Kandor, Mxyzptlk with prominent tooth and returning to the fifth dimension when spelling his name backwards, and Brainiac with his monkey Koko. The Metropolis Mayor is named Swan, after comic artist Curt Swan. Ben Jones switched the episode's teaser with the one intended for "Sword of the Atom!" because this episode was running too long. The episode was included on the season 2 part 2 DVD volume.
54	2	"Joker: The Vile and the Villainous!"	Michael Goguen	J.M. DeMatteis	April 15, 2011	302	S03E02
Teaser: Joker travels to the future and helps Misfit defeat Kamandi and take over Tiger City's Omega Warhead. After taking over Tiger City, the Joker activates the warhead, destroying Earth. Main plot: Joker and the Weeper work together to defeat Batman and his new crime predicting machine, but Batman takes back control over the episode and defeats Joker and Weeper, to Joker's dismay. Note: This episode was essentially taken over by Joker (until the end). As such, the roles of protagonist and antagonist are reversed. Even the theme song is a "Jokerized" version, with several of his fellow criminals shown, but the ending credits are the same as usual.
55	3	"Shadow of the Bat!"	Ben Jones	Paul Giacoppo	April 22, 2011	303	S03E03
Teaser: From the files of the Bat-Computer, Batman and Robin in jungle-based outfits end up fighting Catwoman and her panther Hecate in Africa. Batman and Robin are also assisted by Bat-Ape. Main plot: Batman is assisted in chasing down the vampire Dala by Etrigan, but ends up getting bitten. Though he tries fighting off the hunger, Batman ends up feeding on Black Mask and Alfred. Seeing as there is no way to suppress his hunger, Batman decides to feed on the Justice League. Though they put up a good fight, all but Martian Manhunter become vampires as well. Luckily, Etrigan comes to help, allowing Martian Manhunter to orbit the base close enough to the sun to incinerate the vampires. Batman awakens from this to see that he was just having a hallucination caused by Dala's bite.
56	4	"Night of the Batmen!"	Michael Goguen	J.M. DeMatteis	April 29, 2011	304	S03E04
Teaser: Batman and Vigilante have a showdown against some gangsters, and Vigilante sings throughout the fight. Main plot: Batman is hurt after helping Aquaman, Captain Marvel, Green Arrow, and Martian Manhunter prevent Kanjar Ro from destroying a planet and hospitalized. Aquaman reveals Batman's condition in his new memoir. Aquaman, Captain Marvel, Green Arrow, and Plastic Man wear his costume and go to protect Gotham City from criminals in Batman's place. When Joker ends up taking the four of them down, Batman must evade the care of Martian Manhunter to stop Joker's plot. Note: This episode was adapted from a story in the series' tie-in comic. Also, character designs from The New Batman Adventures, Batman Beyond, and The Batman (among others) appear at the end of the episode.
57	5	"Scorn of the Star Sapphire!"	Ben Jones	Steven Melching	September 16, 2011	305<	S03E05
Teaser: Wonder Woman comes in to defeat Baroness Paula von Gunther and her army of robots, as well as to save Batman and Steve Trevor. Main plot: Following battles with Tattooed Man and Major Disaster, Batman teams up with Hal Jordan to fight Star Sapphire and her Zamaron army. Unbeknownst to Batman and Hal Jordan, Star Sapphire is Carol Ferris, whom the Zamarons abducted and turned into Star Sapphire. Note: This episode was released on iTunes on May 28, 2011.
58	6	"Time Out for Vengeance!"	Michael Goguen	J.M. DeMatteis	September 23, 2011	306	S03E06
Teaser: The Creeper cheers on and helps Batman when he is fighting Hellgrammite. Afterwards, Creeper leaves to evade the arriving police officers. Main plot: After Batman disappears following a fight with Catman, the Justice League and Rip Hunter travel through time to stop the minions of Equinox from wiping out all the incarnations of Batman throughout time. Note: The episode had references from Grant Morrison's The Return of Bruce Wayne storyline.
59	7	"Sword of the Atom!"	Ben Jones	Thomas Pugsley and Steven Melching	September 30, 2011	307	S03E07
Teaser: Aquaman does a musical number in a spoof of a 1950s sitcom called "The Currys of Atlantis". This teaser features Aquaman's entire family, including his wife and Aqualad as well as Black Manta. In the sitcom, Aquaman forgets about his wife's anniversary on the day he's supposed to fight crime with Batman. The opening theme song sung by Aquaman is a parody of the main theme for the 1966–67 Phyllis Diller series The Pruitts of Southampton. Main plot: Two years ago, Batman and the Atom (Ray Palmer) worked together to save themselves from villains like Cannoneer, Dwarfstar, and Thinker. Ray later retired and Ryan Choi takes up the mantle. Two years later, Palmer's arch-nemesis Chronos plans an attack and Batman goes looking for him. When Batman disappears, Aquaman and Atom (Ryan Choi) must shrink to a microscopic size in the Amazon Jungle to save the Caped Crusader and Ray Palmer from tiny aliens called Katarthans who are led by Chancellor Deraegis. Note: This episode's teaser was switched with the one for "Battle of the Superheroes!" because that episode was running too long.
60	8	"Triumvirate of Terror!"	Michael Goguen	Paul Giacoppo	October 7, 2011	308	S03E08
Teaser: The Justice League International (which includes Robin, Kid Flash, Batman, Wonder Woman, Superman, Aquaman, Booster Gold, Plastic Man and Green Arrow) plays a game of baseball against the Legion of Doom (consisting of Lex Luthor, Joker, Cheetah, Weather Wizard, Felix Faust, and Amazo) with Jimmy Olsen as the host. Batman makes the heroes win and is honoured by them. Main plot: Batman teams up with Superman and Wonder Woman when their arch-enemies Joker, Lex Luthor, and Cheetah team up to defeat them by adopting a strategy of attacking a different hero: Wonder Woman vs Joker, Superman vs Cheetah, and Batman vs Luthor. They are captured and it is revealed that the heroes go against their archenemies. Note: The teaser is based on DC Superstars Giant #10 (1976). The music during the first fight between Wonder Woman and Cheetah is based in the Wonder Woman opening theme. The villains' headquarters is the Hall of Doom, which first appeared in Challenge of the Superfriends. The Xudarians (Tomar-Re's species) make a brief appearance watching the villains' transmission. The ending of the episode contains a cameo by Prez Rickard as President of the United States.
61	9	"Bold Beginnings!"	Ben Jones	Alan Burnett, Paul Dini, and Steven Melching	October 14, 2011	309	S03E09
Teaser: Batman and Space Ghost team up to save Jan, Jace, and Blip from Creature King. Main plot: When Green Arrow, Plastic Man, and Aquaman are captured by Mr. Freeze, they reminisce about the early days of their careers when they first worked with Batman against the Cavalier and Ruby Ryder, Baby Face and his crew, and Black Manta.
62	10	"Powerless!"	Michael Goguen	Greg Weisman, Todd Casey, and Kevin Hopps	October 21, 2011	310	S03E10
Teaser: The Jokers of All Nations gatecrash the headquarters of the Batmen of All Nations in a bid to destroy them all. Main plot: Captain Atom, the newest member of the Justice League, is drained of his powers when the team takes on his old enemy Major Force. As the League try to stop the villain's rampage, Captain Atom struggles to fit in without powers.After getting his powers back, he apologises to Batman for ridiculing him because he did not have powers.
63	11	"Crisis: 22,300 Miles Above Earth!"	Michael Goguen	Steven Melching	October 28, 2011	312	S03E11
Teaser: Joker, Penguin, Gorilla Grodd, Kite Man, Black Manta, Two-Face, Gentleman Ghost, Mr. Freeze, Riddler, Poison Ivy, Clock King, and Solomon Grundy conduct a roast of Batman and Jeffrey Ross is brought in as the star guest, Ross distracts the villains while Batman escapes from the death trap leaving the Dark Knight free to take down his enemies. Main plot: The Justice League hosts a party on the Watchtower for themselves and the Justice Society, but the two teams fail to get along and a brawl breaks out. Meanwhile, Batman attempts to stop Ra's al Ghul's latest scheme but runs into trouble.
64	12	"Four Star Spectacular!"	Ben Jones	Matt Youngberg, Ben Jones, Stephen DeStefano, and Adam Van Wyk	November 4, 2011	313	S03E12
A compilation of four short stories written and storyboarded by the show's directors. Batman appears as a secondary character in all shorts: Adam Strange in Worlds War – Having picked up an anniversary gift for Alanna on Earth, Adam Strange spots that the zeta beams are firing everywhere in an erratic fashion and learns that Kanjar Ro (who is attempting to destroy Rann and take over the universe) is responsible.; Flash in Double Jeopardy – After saving him from Captain Boomerang, Flash tells Batman about an encounter he just had with Mirror Master and Abra Kadabra.; Mazing Man in Kitty Catastrophe – 'Mazing Man cat-sits for a couple while they are out, but inadvertently causes extreme damage to their home.; The Creature Commandos in The War That Time Forgot – In the year 1943, the Creature Commandos go to Dinosaur Island to investigate the disappearances of some of the Allies, including Batman, and end up confronting the brains behind the plan: the Ultra-Humanite.
65	13	"Mitefall!"	Ben Jones	Paul Dini	November 18, 2011	311	S03E13
Teaser: Batman travels to Earth-5501 and thwarts Abraham Lincoln's assassination, during which he battles a steampunk-armored John Wilkes Booth. Main plot: Bat-Mite has grown weary of Batman: The Brave and the Bold, feeling that the show has jumped the shark, so he concocts a scheme to make it so bad that the network will have to cancel the show. Ambush Bug tries to thwart his plan, while saving Batman, Aquaman and everyone else before it's too late. Despite their best efforts, the show is still cancelled with Bat-Mite realizing too late that this also means his own existence will end. All of the characters gather in the Batcave for a final curtain call and in the final moments of the show, Batman says goodbye to the audience, promising that he will always be there to fight evil and protect the innocent. Special Guest Stars: Paul Reubens as Bat-Mite, Henry Winkler as Ambush Bug, Ted McGinley as the new voice of Aquaman.

=== Film (2018) ===
Title	Directed by	Written by	Original release date
Scooby-Doo! & Batman: The Brave and the Bold	Jake Castorena	Paul Giacoppo	January 6, 2018
This film is a crossover with the Scooby-Doo franchise. The Mystery Inc. gang are recruited by Batman to join his team of fellow detectives in Gotham City, to help solve a case of a villain once called the Crimson Cloak.

== See also ==
- Batman: The Brave and the Bold
- The Brave and the Bold
