= The Brave and the Bold (disambiguation) =

The Brave and the Bold is a comic book series published by DC Comics from 1955 to 1983.

The Brave and the Bold may also refer to:

- The Brave and the Bold (film), an upcoming film
- "The Brave and the Bold" (Arrow), an episode of Arrow
- The Brave and the Bold (album), a 2006 collaborative album by Tortoise and Bonnie 'Prince' Billy
- Batman: The Brave and the Bold, an animated television series
  - List of Batman: The Brave and the Bold episodes
  - List of Batman: The Brave and the Bold characters
- Batman: The Brave and the Bold (comics), a comic book series
- Batman: The Brave and the Bold – The Videogame, a video game
- Scooby-Doo! & Batman: The Brave and the Bold, a 2018 animated film

== See also ==
- The Bold and the Brave, 1956 American World War II adventure film
