= Mayhem of the Music Meister! =

- Batman: The Brave and the Bold episode
- The episode's title card
- Episode no.: Season 1 Episode 24
- Directed by: Ben Jones
- Written by: Michael Jelenic
- Original air date: October 23, 2009
- Running time: 22 minutes

Guest appearance
- Neil Patrick Harris as Music Meister

"Mayhem of the Music Meister!" is an episode of the Batman: The Brave and the Bold animated series. The episode features the villainous Music Meister (voiced by Neil Patrick Harris), who uses his power to control people through song to try to take over the world. Written by Michael Jelenic and directed by Ben Jones, the episode premiered on October 23, 2009, the 24th of the first season.

The musical episode, which has been compared to Buffy the Vampire Slayer's "Once More, with Feeling", was generally well received by critics and viewers. Unlike other episodes of The Brave and the Bold, the episode does not feature a traditional cold open.

== Plot ==
The Music Meister, a villain capable of controlling others through song, induces Black Canary, Green Arrow, Aquaman, Black Manta, Gorilla Grodd and Clock King to hijack a United Nations communications satellite ("I'm The Music Meister"). When Batman intervenes, he orders them to attack the hero, which they do in a dance style reminiscent of West Side Story. His plan successful, the Meister frustrates Batman once more, escaping by forcing his captives to dance towards the rocket blast, leaving Batman to rescue them rather than apprehend the villain. Meister escapes to an empty opera house where, in a reference to "The Phantom of the Opera", he plays the organ to a cardboard audience. Batman tries to capture him on a cross-town chase, as Meister releases the inmates and villains of Iron Heights and Arkham Asylum ("Drives Us Bats"). Having heard Black Canary sing about her unrequited love for Batman ("If Only"), the Meister has fallen for her, but not enough to give up villainy, and she rejects him. Meister captures Black Canary and Batman and puts them in a death trap ("Death Trap"), in an industrial style set. They escape as Music Meister uses the satellite to hypnotize the world with his music. ("The World Is Mine") When Black Canary becomes his slave, Batman tricks Canary into singing as high as him, using the satellite to transmit her sonic scream and break Music Meister's mind control. Batman finally defeats the Music Meister and rejects Black Canary's advances. Though Black Canary gives up on Batman, she finds love with Green Arrow, who had unrequited feelings for her. ("If Only (Reprise)")

== Voice cast ==
- Diedrich Bader as Batman
  - Jeff Bennett as Batman (singing voice)
- Dee Bradley Baker as Clock King
- Grey DeLisle as Black Canary
- John DiMaggio as Aquaman and Gorilla Grodd
- Tom Kenny as Baby Face
- Kevin Michael Richardson as Black Manta
- James Arnold Taylor as Green Arrow
- Neil Patrick Harris as Music Meister

== Reception and legacy ==
"Mayhem of the Music Meister!" screened on June 24, 2009 at Comic-Con, where supervising producer James Tucker noted that he believed that the show would be successful after seeing people wearing Music Meister costumes after the episode's debut. The episode received a standing ovation at its debut, in part because of the humor of the Music Meister's dance-inducing powers.

The episode was nominated for an Emmy Award and has been called one of television's best musicals. The episode has been used as an example of the merits of Batman: The Brave and the Bold.

The character of the Music Meister has subsequently appeared in other Batman media, such as comics, television series, and video games.

== Soundtrack ==
Batman: The Brave And The Bold: Mayhem of the Music Meister! (Soundtrack from the Animated Television Show)

Soundtrack album by various
- Released: October 23, 2009
- Length: 18:46
- Label: New Line Records

The soundtrack of "Mayhem of the Music Meister!" was released on October 23, 2009, as Batman: The Brave and the Bold: Mayhem of the Music Meister! (Soundtrack from the Animated Television Show). It contains 8 tracks from the episode and has been praised as being fun while criticized for its brevity.

=== Track listing ===
No.	Title	Writer(s)	Performer	Length
1.	"Batman: The Brave and the Bold Theme"	Andy Sturmer	N/A	0:32
2.	"I'm the Music Meister"	Michael McCuistion and James Tucker	Neil Patrick Harris, Grey DeLisle, and John DiMaggio	5:54
3.	"Drives Us Bats"	Lolita Ritmanis and Michael Jelenic	Harris, DeLisle, and DiMaggio	1:46
4.	"If Only"	Ritmanis and Jelenic	Harris and DeLisle	2:35
5.	"Death Trap"	Kristopher Carter and Tucker	Harris and DeLisle	1:49
6.	"The World is Mine!"	Carter and Jelenic	Harris, DeLisle, and Jeff Bennett	3:34
7.	"If Only (Reprise)"	Ritmanis and Jelenic	James Arnold Taylor and DeLisle	2:03
8.	"Drives Us Bats (Mayhem of the Music Meister End Credits)"		Harris, DiMaggio, and Kevin Michael Richardson	0:31
Total length:				18:44

== In other media ==
=== Television ===
- The Music Meister appears in the Arrowverse, portrayed by Darren Criss. This version is an extra-dimensional being and fan of Supergirl and the Flash. Introduced in the Supergirl episode "Star-Crossed" as a prisoner of unknown origin in the Department of Extranormal Operations (DEO)'s custody on Earth-38, he hypnotizes Supergirl into a coma before stealing her inter-dimensional extrapolator to escape to Earth-1. In The Flash episode "Duet", Supergirl's allies bring her to the Flash's team on Earth-1, but the Music Meister traps him and Supergirl in a shared dream where they are singers in a 1940s gangster / musical film. Once the pair escape with help from their friends, the Meister reveals he brought them together to teach them a lesson in love before disappearing.
- The Music Meister appears in the Harley Quinn episode "It's a Swamp Thing", voiced by Larry Owens. This version is a black therapist who is inspired by R&B instead of musical theater.
- The Music Meister appears in the Batwheels episode "Music Meister Mayhem", voiced by Andy Sturmer.

=== Film ===
The Music Meister makes a non-speaking cameo appearance in Scooby-Doo! & Batman: The Brave and the Bold.

=== Video games ===
- The Music Meister appears as a playable character in Lego Batman 3: Beyond Gotham, voiced by Troy Baker.
- The Music Meister appears as a playable character in Lego DC Super-Villains, voiced by J. P. Karliak.
- The Music Meister appears in Batman: Caped Crusader - Chronicles (2026), voiced by André Sogliuzzo. This version has a Southern accent.
