= The Rise of the Blue Beetle! =

- Batman: The Brave and the Bold episode
- Episode title card
- Episode no.: Season 1 Episode 1
- Directed by: Ben Jones
- Written by: Michael Jelenic
- Original air date: November 14, 2008

"The Rise of the Blue Beetle" is the first episode of the animated television series Batman: The Brave and the Bold. The episode introduces Blue Beetle (Jaime Reyes) in his first media appearance outside comic books.

== Plot ==
The episode opens with Batman and Green Arrow breaking out of Clock King's clockwork death trap clock that would have lowered them into acid, before going on to fight him and his henchmen. The main plot starts after the theme song airs.

Teenage Jaime Reyes has become the new Blue Beetle, but is not convinced that he has what it takes to be a superhero, partially because he has difficulty controlling his powers. Batman decides to take the young superhero under his wing and asks Blue Beetle to help him stop a meteor. The mission is stopped, however, when Blue Beetle's scarab creates a wormhole which sends the two superheroes to a distant planet. The planet is inhabited by intelligent single-celled aliens called Gibbles that are under constant siege by the intergalactic pirate Kanjar Ro, who wants to harvest their bodies for fuel. The aliens mistakenly believe Blue Beetle is another, alien, scarab-wearing Blue Beetle who is their savior, and who Batman correctly guesses was killed, and think Batman is his sidekick. Blue Beetle is not confident that he can save them, although he decides to try when he sees the hope they have for him. Batman tells Blue Beetle to give a speech to the aliens to encourage them to help him and Batman fight Ro. Ro is meanwhile draining energy from the Gibbles to power his ships for raids on the Medra Quadrant, but Batman, Blue Beetle and the Gibble army attacks and Blue Beetle starts getting the hang of controlling the suit. He saves Batman from Ro, then fights and defeats him, but Ro returns, freeing his crew and using his Gamma Gong on Blue Beetle, which he knows that he has a weakness for; its sonic waves eliminates his suit, and was how he killed the last Blue Beetle. Batman is incapacitated, and another blow of the Gong completely strips Blue Beetle's armor away; when Ro sees his greatest foe is a child, he realizes he did eliminate the Beetle the last time they fought.

After the Gibble army is soon after defeated, Ro has Batman and some Gibbles tied to a satellite floating in a part of space with fish-like space monsters that come to eat them, but Batman plugs one of the satellite's cables into the body of the Gibble next to him, charging it with power to electrocute one of the monsters and scare the other monsters away. Meanwhile, Ro has tied up Blue Beetle and is now using the Gong to find the right frequency to remove the Scarab. As Batman enters and Ro is knocked into the Gong, the scarab is removed by the created tones. Ro attaches it to his spine and uses its power to fight Batman. Meanwhile, Jaime thinks creatively and escapes his bonds, and before Ro can kill Batman, he arrives with the Gong and uses it to strip away the armor and remove the Scarab from Ro. Enraged, he tries to attack them, but the Gibble from before arrives and uses a newly made weapon that utilizes the power from its body to knock Ro out. Before he and Blue Beetle leave their planet, the Gibbles thank Batman for his part in helping Blue Beetle and themselves to defeat Ro.

Returning to Earth through the wormhole, they find it has brought them back to not only the exact place, but also the exact time after they had gone through it the first time. This gives them enough time to finish the mission to stop the meteor that got them sent through the wormhole in the first place, and after making sure his partner is ready, Batman and Blue Beetle take on the meteor.

== Voice cast ==
- Diedrich Bader as Batman
- Dee Bradley Baker as Clock King, Gibble Leader and Reporter
- Will Friedle as Jaime Reyes / Blue Beetle
- Jason Marsden as Paco
- James Arnold Taylor as Green Arrow
- Marc Worden as Kanjar Ro

== Production ==
Series story editor and producer Michael Jelenic wrote the scene with Jaime and his friend Paco, commenting on Batman and Green Arrow on television because that is the type of thing that he imagined fanboys arguing about. The Clock King segment includes pop culture references while Jaime's room has a The Dark Knight Returns poster. The episode has easter eggs of characters that did not appear in the episode.

== Reception ==
Dan Phillips of IGN said that people would not like "The Rise of the Blue Beetle!" very much if they have a problem with "wormholes, single-cell organisms and evil intergalactic pirates being mentioned in the same breath as Batman". Scott Summers of Toonzone liked the plot of the episode while also noting that there are references to older Batman animation. Rob M. Worley of Mania said that the episode has "laugh-out-loud moments" and praised the action and plot twists.
