= Gorillas in Our Midst (disambiguation) =

"Gorillas in Our Midst: Sustained Inattentional Blindness for Dynamic Events" is an article by Daniel Simons and Christopher Chabris describing The Invisible Gorilla test, a famous study demonstrating inattentional blindness.

Gorillas in Our Midst may also refer to:

- A book by Richard Fairgray
- An episode of Endgame (TV series)
- An episode of Cataclysmo and the Time Boys
- "Gorillas in Our Midst!", an episode of Batman: The Brave and the Bold

== See also ==
- Gorillas in the Mist, a film about the life of Dian Fossey
- The Invisible Gorilla, a book by Chabris and Simons
