= Batman: The Brave and the Bold – The Videogame =

2010 video game

- Wii cover art
- Developer: WayForward Technologies
- Publisher: Warner Bros. Interactive Entertainment
- Directors: Adam Tierney (Wii); Sean Velasco (DS)
- Producers: Christopher Watson (Wii); Robb Alvey (DS)
- Designers: Adam Tierney; Michael Herbster (Wii); Matt Bozon; Sean Velasco (DS); James Montagna (DS)
- Programmers: Lee McDole; Stephen Foot (Wii); Chris Losorelli; Mike de la Peña (DS)
- Artists: Marc Gomez; Paul Castillo; Damon DuBois (Wii); Nick Wozniak; Henk Nieborg (DS)
- Writers: Adam Tierney (Wii); Sean Velasco (DS)
- Composers: Jake Kaufman; Kristopher Carter; Michael McCuistion; Lolita Ritmanis
- Series: Batman
- Platforms: Wii, Nintendo DS
- Release: NA: September 7, 2010; AU: September 9, 2010; EU: September 24, 2010
- Genres: Beat 'em up, platform
- Modes: Single-player, multiplayer

Batman: The Brave and the Bold – The Videogame is a video game based on the comic book character Batman and the television cartoon series Batman: The Brave and the Bold. It was developed by WayForward Technologies and distributed by Warner Bros. Interactive Entertainment. It was released on September 7, 2010, for the Wii and Nintendo DS, and is the only non-Lego Batman video game released for those platforms.

== Gameplay ==
Co-op screenshot of Batman and Hawkman fighting enemies with Jay Garrick summoned in the fight.

Batman: The Brave and The Bold – The Videogame is a side-scroller beat 'em up/platformer with 2D animated visuals based on those of the series. Each level is presented as an episode and features Batman teaming up with one of several superheroes, including Hawkman, Robin, Green Lantern, Blue Beetle, and Plastic Man to stop various supervillains. Players have access to several gadgets and can also summon another Jump-In Hero to perform a powerful attack. As the enemies are defeated, coins can be collected. They can be used to upgrade Batman's gadgets, making them more powerful.

The Nintendo DS version is a single-player game in which the player switches control between Batman and the available hero, using each of their abilities to progress through each level. Players with both versions of the game can control Bat-Mite in the Wii version via Nintendo DS connectivity.

== Development ==
The video game was developed under the direction of Adam Tierney, while working closely with Warner Bros. Animation. When pitching the idea to Warner Bros., they framed it as a 'playable cartoon'. The intent was to replace extended cut-scenes with exhaustive dialogue in lieu of over 400 pages of quips and gags, and the occasional plot beat, that played out during gameplay.

== Reception ==
Reception

Aggregate scores
Aggregator	Score	
Aggregator	DS	Wii
GameRankings	73.77%	73.21%
Metacritic	74/100	70/100

Review scores
Publication	Score	
Publication	DS	Wii
1Up.com	N/A	B+
Destructoid	N/A	8/10
Game Informer	N/A	8.5/10
GamePro	N/A	3/5
GameSpot	7.5/10	7/10
GameTrailers	N/A	7.5/10
GameZone	6.5/10	6/10
IGN	7.5/10	6.5/10
Joystiq	N/A	3.5/5
Nintendo Life	8/10	7/10
Nintendo Power	N/A	7/10
Nintendo World Report	8.5/10	N/A
Official Nintendo Magazine	N/A	83%

The games received mixed to slightly positive reviews. GameRankings gave the game a score of 73% for the Wii version and 74% for the DS version; while Metacritic gave it a score of 70 out of 100 for the Wii version and 74 out of 100 for the DS version.

IGN gave the Wii version a score of 6.5, saying it is too repetitive for $40, while the DS version received a score of 7.5, saying that "it won't last long, but it's satisfying". 1UP.com gave the Wii version a B+ rank, saying "while it errs a bit too much toward simplicity, The Brave And The Bold is a great family-friendly Batman game". GameSpot gave the Wii version a 7, calling it entertaining, if lacking challenge. GameTrailers gave the game a score of 7.5. GameSpot also awarded the game an award for "Best Use of a Creative License" in 2010.
