= Batman: The Brave and the Bold =

American animated television series

- Genre: Action; Adventure; Superhero; Comedy
- Based on: Batman by: Bob Kane; Bill Finger (uncredited)
- Developed by: James Tucker; Michael Jelenic
- Directed by: Michael Chang; Michael Goguen; Heather A. Maxwell; Brandon Vietti
- Voices of: Diedrich Bader; Jeff Bennett; Corey Burton; John DiMaggio; Will Friedle; Tom Kenny; James Arnold Taylor
- Theme music composer: Andy Sturmer
- Composers: Kristopher Carter; Michael McCuistion; Lolita Ritmanis
- Country of origin: United States
- Original language: English
- No. of seasons: 3
- No. of episodes: 65 (list of episodes)

Production
- Executive producer: Sam Register
- Producers: James Tucker; Michael Jelenic; Linda Steiner
- Editor: Joe Gall
- Running time: 26 minutes
- Production companies: Warner Bros. Animation; DC Comics (season 1); DC Entertainment (seasons 2–3)

Original release
- Network: Cartoon Network
- Release: November 14, 2008 – November 18, 2011

Related
- The Batman (2004–2008); Beware the Batman (2013–2014)

Batman: The Brave and the Bold is an American animated television series based in part on the DC Comics series The Brave and the Bold which features two or more superheroes coming together to solve a crime or foil a super villain. As the title suggests, the series focuses on Batman's regular "team-ups" with various heroes similar to the most well-known version of the original comic book series. This version has a much lighter and simpler, often comic feel, targeting younger viewers more than the character's other series. The series premiered on November 14, 2008, on Cartoon Network in the United States, and ended on November 18, 2011. It also aired in Canada on Teletoon. The series was followed by a comic-book continuation which ended in 2014, and a feature-length crossover film: Scooby-Doo! & Batman: The Brave and the Bold, which aired in 2018.

It was the first series produced by Warner Bros. Animation to be broadcast in high definition.

== Overview ==
Each episode of Batman: The Brave and the Bold features Batman teaming up with other characters from the DC Universe to thwart villains or to solve crimes, the show focusing mainly on the inclusion of lesser-known characters. Most episodes have a cold open with an escapade not related to the remainder of the episode. In the first season, the villain was Equinox, who later returned in "Time Out for Vengeance!"; and in the second season, the villain was the alien Starro. During production, the show's creator said that if a character's cold open appearance was deemed successful, then it may warrant exploring the character further in a future episode's main adventure.

Batman: The Brave and the Bold ended after season three, which consisted of 13 episodes. After it ended, a new show, Beware the Batman, returned the character to a more serious tone. A direct-to-video crossover with Scooby-Doo, entitled Scooby-Doo! & Batman: The Brave and the Bold, was released in 2018.

== Cast ==
=== Principal cast ===
- Diedrich Bader – Batman / Bruce Wayne / Matches Malone, Kilowog, Ace, Owlman, Solomon Grundy, Punch, Gorilla Boss, Batman (Damian Wayne), Lord Death Man, Musketeer
- Jeff Bennett – Joker / Red Hood, Captain Marvel, Abra Kadabra, OMAC, Batman (singing voice), Rubberneck, Joker-Mite, Rubin, Penguin (Scooby-Doo version), Prez, El Gaucho, Ultra-Humanite, Starman
- Corey Burton – Red Tornado, Doctor Mid-Nite, Thomas Wayne, Will Magnus, Mercury, Silver Cyclone, False-Face, Chancellor Gor-Zonn, General Zahl, Killer Moth, Batman (Bat-Manga version), Joker (Scooby-Doo version), Green Lantern (Alan Scott)
- John DiMaggio – Aquaman, Gorilla Grodd, Faceless Hunter, Black Mask, Tiger Soldier, Typhon, Enemy Ace, Ubu, Black Adam, Tattoo, Pharaoh, Toyman, Vigilante, Hellgrammite, Mr. Freeze, Legionnaire, Captain Boomerang, Owen
- Will Friedle – Blue Beetle / Jaime Reyes, Scarlet Scarab, Lazy Eye
- Tom Kenny – Plastic Man, Baby Face, Ray, Deadshot, Mirror Master, 'Mazing Man
- James Arnold Taylor – Green Arrow, Green Lantern (Guy Gardner), Blue Bowman, Major Disaster, Wotan, Nabu, Mark Desmond, Arges, Leslie "Rocky" Davis, Alpha-Red, G.I. Robot, Jace

=== Special guest cast ===
- Morena Baccarin – Cheetah
- Edoardo Ballerini – Vulture, Jack
- Xander Berkeley – Sinestro
- Clancy Brown – Per Degaton, Rohtul
- Gabrielle Carteris – Vicki Vale, Princess Laethwen
- Patrick Cavanaugh – Robin (Damian Wayne)
- Mindy Cohn – Velma Dinkley
- Jeffrey Combs – Kite Man
- Kevin Conroy – Batman of Zur-En-Arrh, Phantom Stranger
- Tim Conway – Weeper
- Olivia d'Abo – Elasti-Girl
- Diane Delano – Big Barda
- Dana Delany – Vilsi Vaylar
- Michael Dorn – Bane, Kru'll the Eternal
- Greg Ellis – Gentleman Ghost, Doctor Fate, Cavalier, Dr. Canus, Hawk, Shrapnel, Signalman, Mister Mind, Big Headed Batman
- R. Lee Ermey – Wildcat
- Oded Fehr – Equinox
- Ellen Greene – Mrs. Manface
- Ioan Gruffudd – Matthew "Red" Ryan, Blue Beetle Scarab / Reach
- Mark Hamill – Spectre
- Neil Patrick Harris – Music Meister
- Tippi Hedren – Hippolyta
- John Michael Higgins – Riddler
- William Katt – Hawkman
- Wallace Langham – Ocean Master
- Loren Lester – Green Lantern (Hal Jordan)
- Vicki Lewis – Wonder Woman, Star Sapphire
- Matthew Lillard – Shaggy Rogers
- Carl Lumbly – Tornado Champion / Tornado Tyrant
- Tim Matheson – Jarvis Kord
- David McCallum – Merlin
- Ted McGinley – "Aquaman 2"
- Andy Milder – Flash (Jay Garrick)
- Richard Moll – Lew Moxon, Two-Face (in "Chill of the Night!")
- Phil Morris – Jonah Hex, Fox
- Laraine Newman – Ms. Minerva
- Julie Newmar – Martha Wayne (in "Chill of the Night!")
- Gary Owens – Space Ghost
- Hunter Parrish – Kid Flash, Geo-Force
- Ron Perlman – Doctor Double X
- Jim Piddock – Calendar Man / Calendar King, Doctor Watson, Doctor Sivana, Shazam, Thaddeus Jr.
- James Remar – Two-Face
- Paul Reubens – Bat-Mite
- Henry Rollins – Robotman
- Michael Rosenbaum – Deadman
- Jeff Ross – Himself
- Stephen Root – Penguin, Woozy Winks, Planet Master, Killer Croc
- Peter Scolari – Atom (Ray Palmer)
- Tom Everett Scott – Booster Gold
- Armin Shimerman – Calculator, Psycho-Pirate, Walter Mark "Prof" Haley, Guardian of the Universe #2
- John Wesley Shipp – Professor Zoom
- J. K. Simmons – Kyle "Ace" Morgan, Guardian of the Universe #1, Evil Star
- Cree Summer – Vixen
- Jeffrey Tambor – Crazy Quilt
- Tony Todd – Astaroth
- Alan Tudyk – Flash (Barry Allen)
- Michael T. Weiss – Adam Strange
- Adam West – Thomas Wayne (in "Chill of the Night!"), Proto-Bot
- Wil Wheaton – Blue Beetle (Ted Kord)
- Michael Jai White – Tattooed Man
- Gary Anthony Williams – Mongul, Fun Haus, Mongal
- Tyler James Williams – Jason Rusch / Firestorm
- Wade Williams – Mantis, Supreme Chairman of Qward
- Thomas F. Wilson – Sportsmaster, Catman
- Henry Winkler – Ambush Bug
- Peter Woodward – Ra's al Ghul, Great Caesar
- Michael-Leon Wooley – Kalibak, Darkseid
- "Weird Al" Yankovic – Himself, Mr. Star

=== Additional voices ===
- Sebastian Bader – Robin (Future)
- Dee Bradley Baker – Clock King, Felix Faust, Etrigan / Jason Blood, Brain, Chemo, Misfit, Scarecrow, Ace the Bat-Hound, Oberon, Ramjam, Dove, Brother Eye, GPA Operative, Fisherman, Professor Zee, Tin, Professor Milo, Animal-Vegetable-Mineral Man, Starro (in "The Siege of Starro!" Pt. 2), Haunted Tank, Madniks, Bug-Eyed Bandit, Mister Atom, baby Batman, Warren Griffith, Vincent Velcro, Elliot Taylor, John Wilkes Booth, Punchichi
- Gregg Berger – Hammer Toes, Brain Scientist, Police Captain, Crime Boss, Creature King
- Brian Bloom – Iron, Oxygen, Creeper, Rip Hunter, Captain Atom
- Steve Blum – Heat Wave, Captain Cold
- Andrea Bowen – Talia al Ghul
- Ian Buchanan – Sherlock Holmes
- Cathy Cavadini – Alanna, Jan, Ruby Ryder, Fiona, Dr. Myrra Rhodes
- Grey DeLisle – Fire, Black Canary, Daphne Blake, Robin (Dick Grayson) (Bat-Manga version), Dala
- John DeVito – Captain Marvel Jr.
- Sean Donnellan – Elongated Man, Steve Trevor
- Robin Atkin Downes – Weather Wizard, Kobra, Firefly, Ten-Eyed Man
- Bill Fagerbakke – Ronnie Raymond / Firestorm, Lead, Helium
- Nika Futterman – Lashina, Catwoman / Selina Kyle
- James Garrett – Alfred Pennyworth
- Zachary Gordon – young Bruce Wayne, young Aqualad
- Richard Green – General Kreegaar
- Kim Mai Guest – Katana (in "Inside the Outsiders!")
- Nicholas Guest – Question, Martian Manhunter
- Jennifer Hale – Ramona, Poison Ivy (in "Chill of the Night!"), Zatanna, Killer Frost, Ice
- David K. Hill – Negative Man
- Sirena Irwin – Mera, Lois Lane
- Lauri Johnson – Ma Murder
- Mikey Kelley – Kamandi, young Batman
- Lex Lang – Doctor Polaris, Hourman, Gold / Alloy, Hydrogen, young Wildcat, Batman (Dick Grayson)
- Hope Levy – Stargirl, Phantom Lady
- Yuri Lowenthal – Mister Miracle, Prince Tuftan, Bulletman
- Tress MacNeille – Ms. Gatsby
- Jason Marsden – Paco, Speedy, Robin (Dick Grayson) (Scooby-Doo version)
- Vanessa Marshall – Poison Ivy (in "The Mask of Matches Malone!"), The Bat Lady / Katrina Moldoff
- Richard McGonagle – Sardath, Professor Carter Nichols, Chief, Perry White, Brainiac
- Scott Menville – Metamorpho
- Jason C. Miller – Doll Man, Black Condor
- Pat Musick – Martha Wayne (in "Dawn of the Deadman!")
- Ryan Ochoa – young Speedy
- Peter Onorati – Joe Chill
- Vyvan Pham – Katana (in "Enter the Outsiders!")
- Alexander Polinsky – Slug, G'nort, Jimmy Olsen
- Rachel Quaintance – Carol Ferris
- Enn Reitel – Chancellor Deraegis
- Peter Renaday – Uncle Sam, Abraham Lincoln
- Kevin Michael Richardson – Black Manta, B'wana Beast, Steppenwolf, Detective Chimp, Lex Luthor, Despero, Blockbuster, Monsieur Mallah, Starro (in "The Siege of Starro!" Pt. 1), Telle-Teg, Barack Obama, Mister Mxyzptlk
- Bumper Robinson – Black Lightning
- Roger Rose – Superman / Clark Kent, WHIZ Reporter Tom Tyler, Amazo
- Eliza Schneider – Paula von Gunther, Georgette Taylor
- Jeremy Shada – young Dick Grayson
- Zack Shada – Aqualad
- James Sie – Atom (Ryan Choi), Dyna-Mite
- Jane Singer – Jewelee
- Meghan Strange – Harley Quinn
- Preston Strother – Arthur Curry Jr., Chris
- Tara Strong – Huntress, Billy Batson, Mary Marvel, Georgia Sivana, young Batman
- Gary Anthony Sturgis – Bronze Tiger
- Fred Tatasciore – Mutant Master, Arsenal, Sgt. Rock, Major Force
- Hynden Walch – Platinum, Carbon Dioxide
- Frank Welker – Batboy, Fred Jones, Scooby-Doo, Batman (Scooby-Doo version)
- Billy West – Skeets
- Mae Whitman – Batgirl
- Tyrel Jackson Williams – Kyle
- Crawford Wilson – Dick Grayson (Nightwing / Robin)
- Marc Worden – Kanjar Ro, Joker Jr., Lt. Matthew Shrieve
- Tatyana Yassukovich – Morgaine le Fay
- Keone Young – GPA Operative

== Episodes ==
Season	Episodes	Originally released	
Season	Episodes	First released	Last released
1	26	November 14, 2008	November 13, 2009
2	26	November 20, 2009	April 8, 2011
3	13	March 25, 2011	November 18, 2011
Film		January 6, 2018	

== Production ==
=== Writing ===
The show has no overarching story, instead having most episodes stand alone. The show is lighter in tone than previous Batman series, depicting the Dark Knight as more lighthearted and playful with a "dry, ironic wit". The show features various references to various depictions of Batman in media, including the 1960s Batman TV series.

The tone of the series was addressed in the episode "Legends of the Dark Mite!", when Bat-Mite broke the fourth wall to read a missive from one of the show's creators:

Batman's rich history allows him to be interpreted in a multitude of ways. To be sure, this is a lighter incarnation, but it's certainly no less valid and true to the character's roots than the tortured avenger crying out for mommy and daddy.

Show creators have chosen to go with "lesser known" characters. In many instances, the characters are those that were repeatedly teamed with Batman in the 1970s run of the Brave and the Bold comic book, such as Green Arrow, Wildcat, Plastic Man, and even the Joker. Thus, the characters have an appearance and feel akin to both of their Golden and Silver Age incarnations. While the show has featured major heroes such as the Green Lantern and the Flash, it consistently focused on the lesser-known individuals that portrayed the heroes, such as Guy Gardner and Jay Garrick, rather than the more popular Hal Jordan or Barry Allen, who also appear.

Additionally, Batman's alter ego Bruce Wayne does not appear as an adult during the series in situations where Batman was unmasked. His face was kept hidden until the season 2 episode "Chill of the Night!" when Batman finally confronts Joe Chill. From this episode onwards, whenever Bruce Wayne appears, his face is no longer silhouetted.

=== Crew ===
- Michael Jelenic – Producer, story editor
- Amy McKenna – Line producer
- Sam Register – Executive producer
- Andrea Romano – Casting and voice director
- James Tucker – Producer

== Home media ==
The series was not initially released on DVD in full season formats, like previous Batman series. A series of DVD volumes, with each containing 4–5 episodes, were first released. A two-disc collection of the first 13 episodes, season 1, part 1, was released on August 17, 2010. Season 1, part 2 was released on March 15, 2011, making the first season available both as separate volumes and two-part sets.

Season Two, Part 1, was released on August 16, 2011. It contained 12 episodes and did not contain "The Siege of Starro!". Warner Home Video released Season Two, Part 2 on March 20, 2012. It contains 14 episodes, including the two-part "The Siege of Starro!" and the season 3 episode "Battle of the Superheroes!". The final release, Season 3, complete, was released on June 19 the same year. The DVD also contains the unaired-on-TV season 2 episode "The Mask of Matches Malone!" as a bonus episode.

A Blu-ray set for the first season was released manufacture-on-demand on November 5, 2013, via Warner Archive. This was followed by a second-season manufacture-on-demand Blu-ray set on September 9, 2014, and a third-season manufacture-on-demand Blu-ray set on March 21, 2017. A first-season DVD box set was conventionally released on May 20, 2014, and a second-season DVD box set followed on April 7, 2015.

Volume	Release date	Episodes
1	August 25, 2009	"The Rise of the Blue Beetle!" "Terror on Dinosaur Island!" "Evil Under the Sea!" "Invasion of the Secret Santas!"
2	November 10, 2009	"Day of the Dark Knight!" "Enter the Outsiders!" "Dawn of the Dead Man!" "Fall of the Blue Beetle!"
3	February 2, 2010	"Journey to the Center of the Bat!" "The Eyes of Despero!" "Return of the Fearsome Fangs!" "Deep Cover for Batman!" "Game Over for Owlman!"
4		"Mystery in Space!" "Trials of the Demon!" "Night of the Huntress!" "Menace of the Conqueror Caveman!"
5		"The Color of Revenge!" "Legends of the Dark Mite!" "Hail the Tornado Tyrant!" "Duel of the Double Crossers!"
6		"Last Bat on Earth!" "When OMAC Attacks!" "Mayhem of the Music Meister!" "Inside the Outsiders!" "The Fate of Equinox!"
Season 1, Part 1 (2 discs, 13 episodes)	August 17, 2010	"The Rise of the Blue Beetle!" "Terror on Dinosaur Island!" "Evil Under the Sea!" "Day of the Dark Knight!" "Invasion of the Secret Santas!" "Enter the Outsiders!" "Dawn of the Dead Man!" "Fall of the Blue Beetle!" "Journey to the Center of the Bat!" "The Eyes of Despero!" "Return of the Fearsome Fangs!" "Deep Cover for Batman!" "Game Over for Owlman!"
Season 1, Part 2 (2 discs, 13 episodes)	March 15, 2011	"Mystery in Space!" "Trials of the Demon!" "Night of the Huntress!" "Menace of the Conqueror Caveman!" "The Color of Revenge!" "Legends of the Dark Mite!" "Hail the Tornado Tyrant!" "Duel of the Double Crossers!" "Last Bat on Earth!" "When OMAC Attacks!" "The Fate of Equinox!" "Mayhem of the Music Meister!" "Inside the Outsiders!"
Season 2, Part 1 (2 discs, 12 episodes)	August 16, 2011	"Long Arm of the Law!" "Revenge of the Reach!" "Death Race To Oblivion!" "Aquaman's Outrageous Adventure!" "The Golden Age Of Justice!" "Clash of the Metal Men!" "A Bat Divided!" "Sidekicks Assemble!" "The Super-Batman of Planet X!" "The Power of Shazam!" "Chill of the Night!" "Gorillas In Our Midst!"
Season 2, Part 2 (2 discs, 14 episodes)	March 20, 2012	"The Siege of Starro! Part One" "The Siege of Starro! Part Two" "Requiem for a Scarlet Speedster!" "The Last Patrol!" "Menace of the Madniks!" "Emperor Joker!" "The Criss Cross Conspiracy!" "The Plague of the Prototypes!" "Cry Freedom Fighters!" "The Knights of Tomorrow!" "Darkseid Descending!" "Battle of the Superheroes!" (season 3 episode) "Bat-Mite Presents: Batman's Strangest Cases!" "The Malicious Mr. Mind!"
Season 3, Complete (2 discs, 13 episodes)	June 19, 2012	"Joker: The Vile and the Villainous!" "Shadow of the Bat!" "Night of the Batmen!" "Scorn of the Star Sapphire!" "Time Out for Vengeance!" "Sword of the Atom!" "Triumvirate of Terror!" "Bold Beginnings!" "Powerless!" "Crisis: 22,300 Miles Above Earth!" "Four Star Spectacular!" "Mitefall!" "The Mask of Matches Malone!" (as a bonus episode)
The Complete First Season (4 DVD discs/2 Blu-ray discs, 26 episodes)	November 5, 2013 (Blu-ray); May 20, 2014 (DVD)	"The Rise of the Blue Beetle!" "Terror on Dinosaur Island!" "Evil Under the Sea!" "Day of the Dark Knight!" "Invasion of the Secret Santas!" "Enter the Outsiders!" "Dawn of the Dead Man!" "Fall of the Blue Beetle!" "Journey to the Center of the Bat!" "The Eyes of Despero!" "Return of the Fearsome Fangs!" "Deep Cover for Batman!" "Game Over for Owlman!" "Mystery in Space!" "Trials of the Demon!" "Night of the Huntress!" "Menace of the Conqueror Caveman!" "The Color of Revenge!" "Legends of the Dark Mite!" "Hail the Tornado Tyrant!" "Duel of the Double Crossers!" "Last Bat on Earth!" "When OMAC Attacks!" "The Fate of Equinox!" "Mayhem of the Music Meister!" "Inside the Outsiders!"
The Complete Second Season (4 DVD discs/2 Blu-ray discs, 26 episodes)	September 9, 2014 (Blu-ray); April 7, 2015 (DVD)	"Long Arm of the Law!" "Revenge of the Reach!" "Death Race To Oblivion!" "Aquaman's Outrageous Adventure!" "The Golden Age Of Justice!" "Clash of the Metal Men!" "A Bat Divided!" "Sidekicks Assemble!" "The Super-Batman of Planet X!" "The Power of Shazam!" "Chill of the Night!" "Gorillas In Our Midst!" "The Siege of Starro! Part One" "The Siege of Starro! Part Two" "Requiem for a Scarlet Speedster!" "The Last Patrol!" "Menace of the Madniks!" "Emperor Joker!" "The Criss Cross Conspiracy!" "The Plague of the Prototypes!" "Cry Freedom Fighters!" "The Knights of Tomorrow!" "Darkseid Descending!" "Battle of the Superheroes!" (season 3 episode, DVD only) "The Mask of Matches Malone!" (Blu-ray only) "Bat-Mite Presents: Batman's Strangest Cases!"
The Complete Third Season (1 Blu-ray disc, 13 episodes)	March 21, 2017 (Blu-ray)	"Joker: The Vile and the Villainous!" "Shadow of the Bat!" "Night of the Batmen!" "Scorn of the Star Sapphire!" "Battle of the Superheroes!" "Time Out for Vengeance!" "Sword of the Atom!" "Triumvirate of Terror!" "Bold Beginnings!" "Powerless!" "Crisis: 22,300 Miles Above Earth!" "Four Star Spectacular!" "Mitefall!"

== In other media ==
=== Comic book ===
In January 2009, the first issue of Batman: the Brave and the Bold was released. The comic book follows the same format as the show, starting off with a brief teaser segment at the start of the book which features Batman teaming up with an additional hero for a short adventure unrelated to the rest of the issue. Several authors have contributed to the comic book series, including Matt Wayne, J. Torres, and Landry Walker.

Certain characters such as Superman, Wonder Woman, Captain Marvel Jr. and Mary Marvel made appearances in the comic prior to actually appearing in the show, while other characters, such as Power Girl, Kid Eternity, Brother Power and Angel and the Ape, appeared in the comic without ever actually appearing on the show. In addition, the depictions of several characters in the comic book do not match up with their television counterparts, something that Brave and the Bold director Ben Jones stated stems from the artists not being given reference sheets.

The Batman: The Brave and the Bold comic series began selling in the UK on March 11, 2010, published by Titan Magazines.

In late 2010, the series was relaunched as The All-New Batman: The Brave and the Bold, with the new creative team of Sholly Fisch and Rick Burchett. To devote more pages to the actual story, the teaser segments from the first series were dropped. This incarnation of the title lasted 16 issues. The final issue is a Valentine's-themed story featuring Batman, Batgirl and Bat-Mite.

=== Crossovers ===
In 2018, an animated direct-to-video film, Scooby-Doo! & Batman: The Brave and the Bold, was released. In the film, which features most of the cast reprising their roles from the series, Batman recruits Scooby-Doo and his friends to take on a threat posed by villains of Batman.

The Batman: The Brave and the Bold incarnation of Batman appears in the 2017 episode, "The Academy", of Teen Titans Go! via archival footage.

=== Video games ===
- A video game inspired by the show was released on September 7, 2010, for the Wii and Nintendo DS by WayForward Technologies. The game is a 2D side-scroller for two players. Gentleman Ghost, Mongul, Catman, Gorilla Grodd and Catwoman are major villains in the game. It also features the Rogues, Two-Face, Clock King, Copperhead, Sinestro, Astaroth and Starro.
- On May 6, 2010, DCBeyond.com launched a Unity 3D Batman: The Brave and the Bold game for fans to play for free online.
- Batman's appearance from the series appears as a playable character in Lego Batman 3: Beyond Gotham, via the Batman 75th anniversary DLC pack.
- Batman's suit from the series appears as a playable skin in Lego Batman: Legacy of the Dark Knight.

=== Soundtracks ===
La La Land Records released a 2-disc compilation of music from the series on January 28, 2014, featuring the musical scores for 12 episodes from the first and second seasons (including those of "Legends of the Dark Mite!", "The Mask of Matches Malone!" and "Chill of the Night!"). It is a limited edition release of 2000 units and can be purchased at the La La Land Records website.

A soundtrack exclusively covering songs from the musical episode "Mayhem of the Music Meister!" was released on October 24, 2009.

No.	Title	Lyrics	Music	Performed by	Length
1.	"Batman: The Brave and the Bold Theme"			Andy Sturmer	0:32
2.	"I'm the Music Meister"	James Tucker	Michael McCuistion	Neil Patrick Harris, John DiMaggio, James Arnold Taylor, Kevin Michael Richardson, Dee Bradley Baker and Grey DeLisle	5:54
3.	"Drives Us Bats"	Michael Jelenic	Lolita Ritmanis	Neil Patrick Harris and Various Artists	1:46
4.	"If Only"	Michael Jelenic	Lolita Ritmanis	Neil Patrick Harris and Grey DeLisle	2:35
5.	"Death Trap"	James Tucker	Kristopher Carter	Neil Patrick Harris and Grey DeLisle	1:49
6.	"The World Is Mine"	Michael Jelenic	Kristopher Carter	Neil Patrick Harris, Grey DeLisle, Jeff Bennett and Various Artists	3:34
7.	"If Only (Reprise)"	Michael Jelenic	Lolita Ritmanis	Grey DeLisle and James Arnold Taylor	2:03
8.	"Drives Us Bats (Mayhem of the Music Meister End Credits)"	Michael Jelenic	Lolita Ritmanis		0:31

The main theme has also been included on The Music of DC Comics: 75th Anniversary Collection soundtrack.

== See also ==
- Batman: The Animated Series
- The New Batman Adventures
- The Batman
- Beware the Batman
- Gorillas in Our Midst (disambiguation)
