= Professor Milo =

- Professor Milo as depicted in Who's Who in the DC Universe #18 (August 1986). Art by Mike Zeck (penciler) and John Beatty (inker).

Publication information
- Publisher: DC Comics
- First appearance: Detective Comics #247 (September 1957)
- Created by: Bill Finger (writer); Sheldon Moldoff (artist)

In-story information
- Alter ego: Achilles Milo
- Species: Human
- Abilities: Renowned expert in chemistry and alchemy

Professor Achilles Milo is a fictional character appearing in American comic books published by DC Comics. The character is primarily an enemy of Batman and is a mad scientist who has worked for many other villains throughout his appearances.

== Publication history ==
Professor Achilles Milo first appeared in Detective Comics #247 and was created by Bill Finger and Sheldon Moldoff.

== Fictional character biography ==
Achilles Milo is a renowned chemist who turned to crime. He used a variety of chemical and medical-related schemes to kill Batman involving subjecting Batman to a drug that made him afraid of anything bat-shaped. After Robin helped him get over his fear of bats, Batman tracked down Milo at his laboratory and handed him over to the police. While incarcerated, Milo developed a fear of bats.

When Anthony Lupus visits Milo for a cure for his unbearable headaches, Milo gives him a drug that was derived from the Alaskan timber wolf. Lupus is inflicted with a condition akin to lycanthropy and is manipulated into doing Milo's bidding in exchange for a cure. Lupus later transforms and attacks Milo, resulting in the cure being destroyed.

In 52, Ralph Dibny confronts an emaciated Doctor Milo, who appears without his lower legs and in a wheelchair, which is used to disguise the Silver Wheel of Nyorlath.

An apparently healed Professor Milo appears as the chief henchman and physician of General Immortus. Milo is now in charge of granting artificial superpowers to Immortus' minions. In this capacity, he internalizes the Human Flame's powers, removing his need for a special suit by embedding miniature flamethrowers in his skin.

A still at large Milo (having severed his ties with Immortus) returns to freelancing, offering his enhancement procedures for a hefty fee. He is contacted by Arthur Pemberton to heal the brain damage earlier inflicted in a fight against the Justice Society of America to his daughter Lorna.

== Powers and abilities ==
Professor Milo is an expert in chemistry and alchemy.

== In other media ==
=== Television ===
- Professor Achilles Milo appears in the DC Animated Universe series Batman: The Animated Series and Justice League Unlimited, voiced by Treat Williams in the former and Armin Shimerman in the latter. This version initially works for Roland Daggett and Daggett Industries. He later joins Project Cadmus before being killed by Doomsday.
- Professor Achilles Milo appears in the teaser for the Batman: The Brave and the Bold episode "Gorillas in our Midst!", voiced by Dee Bradley Baker. He battles Batman and the Spectre before the latter turns him into cheese and leaves him to be eaten by rats.

=== Film ===
Professor Milo appears in a flashback in Scooby-Doo! & Batman: The Brave and the Bold. Years prior, he experimented on a faulty teleportation device that seemingly killed his colleague Leo Scarlett until Batman discovered Milo's work and defeated him. His other lab assistant would go on to become The Riddler and revive the project.

=== Video games ===
Professor Milo appears as a non-playable character in Batman: Arkham Underworld, voiced again by Armin Shimerman. This version provides his services to supervillains, offering to provide gadgets, upgrade their abilities, and grant them new ones.

== See also ==
- List of Batman family enemies
