= Gas Gang =

DC Comics group

Publication information
- Publisher: DC comics
- First appearance: Metal Men #6 (February 1964)

In-story information
- Member(s): Oxygen; Helium; Chloroform; Carbon Monoxide; Carbon Dioxide

The Gas Gang were a group of short-lived fictional robots in DC Comics. They first appeared in Metal Men #6.

== Fictional team history ==
After dislodging a meteor from his ship's hull and rescuing Platinum, Will Magnus had his spacesuit perforated by cosmic rays. The effect was that during their return trip to Earth, Magnus became a robot himself. After the Metal Men disobeyed orders and rescued the ship, Magnus threatened to melt down his creations. The Metal Men lock Magnus in his lab and began experimenting on ways to make him human again. Magnus creates a new group of robots, the Gas Gang, who are based on and named for types of gas. As Helium corners the Metal Men, Platinum gets Gold to repeat the experiment, transforming himself into a large cage and trapping the Gas Gang. After connecting himself to high-voltage conductors, Gold melts the Gas Gang and converts them all to steam. Magnus is also inside Gold during the process, which restores him to his human form.

The Gas Gang are rebuilt when the Metal Men return from a space mission, having been fused into a single body and rendered mentally unstable. Carrying out Magnus' instructions to defeat the Metal Men Collective and then bring them to him, the Gas Gang turn against Magnus and try to kill him. Once again, they are defeated and eradicated.

== Members ==
- Oxygen: An oxygen tank.
- Helium: A rubberized container that can expand.
- Carbon Monoxide: A lit Bunsen Burner with a fiery head.
- Chloroform: A cylindrical tank perforated with holes from which it emits gas.
- Carbon Dioxide: An anthropomorphic dry ice crystal.

== In other media ==
The Gas Gang appear in the Batman: The Brave and the Bold episode "Clash of the Metal Men!", consisting of Oxygen (voiced by Brian Bloom), Carbon Dioxide (Hynden Walch), Helium (Bill Fagerbakke), Chloroform - who has no dialogue - and series original characters Hydrogen (Lex Lang) and Nitrogen, the latter of whom also has no dialogue. This version of the Gas Gang consisted of former colleagues of Milton Magnus who were presumed dead while working on a gas designed to trigger volcanic eruptions, which turned them into gaseous beings. In the present, the Gas Gang kidnap Magnus and coerce him into building robot bodies to contain them until they are thwarted by Batman and the Metal Men. During the subsequent battle, Batman accidentally merges the Gas Gang into a lethal gas cloud before destroying them with the Batplane.
