= Metal Men =

Group of fictional characters

The Metal Men
- The Metal Men and their creator, Will Magnus (left to right): Gold, Lead, Platinum (front), Iron (back), Will Magnus (front), Mercury, Tin

Publication information
- Publisher: DC Comics
- First appearance: Showcase #37 (March–April 1962)
- Created by: Robert Kanigher; Ross Andru

In-story information
- Base(s): Magnus Labs
- Member(s): Copper; Gold; Iron; Lead; Dr. Will Magnus; Mercury; Nameless; Platinum; Tin

The Metal Men are a group of robot superheroes that appear in DC Comics. The characters first appeared in Showcase #37 (March–April 1962) and were created by writer Robert Kanigher and artist Ross Andru. Debuting in the Silver Age of Comic Books, the characters have appeared in comic books and other DC Comics-related products such as animated television series, clothing, figurines and trading cards.

== Publication history ==
=== 1960s and 1970s ===
Established as advanced artificially intelligent robots, the Metal Men were introduced in the comic book Showcase #37 (March–April 1962) as last minute filler. Created by scientist Dr. William "Will" Magnus, the six robots were field leader Gold; strongman Iron; slow-witted and loyal Lead; hot-headed Mercury; self-doubting and insecure Tin; and Platinum (also called "Tina"), who believed that she was a real woman and was in love with her creator. The group's personalities mirrored their namesake metals, being dictated by devices called responsometers. Each Metal Man also possessed abilities that reflected the traits of their namesake metal: Gold could stretch his form almost infinitely, Iron was super-strong, Lead could block harmful radiation by morphing into thick shields, Mercury could melt and pass through small spaces before reforming, while Platinum and Tin could stretch, flatten or spin into fine filaments.

The characters reappeared in three issues of Showcase (#38–40, June–October 1962) and proved popular enough to warrant a reappearance in their own eponymous title. First published in May 1963, the title ran on a bi-monthly schedule with original stories until Metal Men #41 (December 1969). The comic was unusual for the time, for having continued serialized storylines across issues. A second female robot (created by Tin) was introduced in issue #13 (April–May 1965), and was later (issue #15, August–September 1965) christened as "Nameless", last appearing in issue #32.

With sales dropping, the series' tone darkened with issue #33 (September 1968), as the cover tagline changed to "The New Hunted Metal Men". Shortly after, the team adopted human identities in issue #37 (May 1969). The title was cancelled in mid-story with issue #41 (December 1969).

Issues #42, 43 and 44 (March, May, and July 1973) reprinted earlier Showcase appearances and the first issue, with the title then on hiatus until returning with original numbering in issue #45 (May 1976). The bi-monthly publishing schedule continued until issue #56 (March 1978), when the title and many others were cancelled during the DC Implosion.

Until issue #21, the Metal Men appeared to be the sole super-heroes in a separate fictional universe, with no other DC Comics characters appearing (though the Metal Men watch a Batman television series, and Dr. Yes is recognized by them as resembling an enemy of Wonder Woman — Magnus and the Metal Men even seem to know at times that they are comic book characters, referring to earlier issues and reader response). Then the Metal Men became part of the shared universe of the DC heroes, even though they continued to fight their own foes (such as Chemo).

The Metal Men co-starred with other DC heroes such as the Atom, Metamorpho, and Batman in The Brave and the Bold #55 (September 1964), #66 (July 1966), #74 (November 1967), #103 (November 1972), #113 (July 1974), #121 (September 1975), #135–136 (July–September 1977) and #187 (June 1982). This trend was repeated with Superman in DC Comics Presents #4 (December 1978) and #70 (June 1984), and an appearance in Showcase #100 (May 1978).

=== 1990s ===
The group returned in an eponymous four-issue miniseries (Metal Men (vol. 2) #1–4 (October 1993 – January 1994)) that featured a retcon of the characters' origin story. A laboratory accident transfers the intellects and personalities of Doctor Magnus' brother Mike, his fiancé Sharon, laboratory workers Redmond Wilde and Randy Pressman, Thomas Tinkham and a pizza delivery man named Jack to blank robots (Gold, Platinum, Mercury, Iron, Tin and Lead, respectively). During a battle, Gold is killed and Doctor Magnus mortally wounded, being forced to transfer his personality into another robot named Veridium. Magnus then becomes the leader of the Metal Men. Lead later makes a brief appearance as a worker at a superhero bar, and is temporarily damaged while protecting civilians. A robot Tungsten with no personality that served as a personal aide to Magnus was introduced in a guest appearance in The Doom Patrol, where he was killed by the entity Candlemaker.

=== 2000s ===
The Metal Men then reappeared during the Infinite Crisis storyline, where they battle the O.M.A.C. cyborgs and join a superhero strike force assembled to protect Metropolis from the Secret Society of Super Villains. Several of the Metal Men appeared in Justice League of America (vol. 2) #1 (August 2006), with the events of the limited series eventually revised and presented as a delusion suffered by Doctor Magnus in 52 #22 (October 2006).

The entire group reappeared in Superman/Batman #34–36 (May, July–August 2007), having been rebuilt and upgraded and including a new female member, the sarcastic Copper. Employed by Lucius Fox as security for WayneTech, the Metal Men temporarily fall under the influence of Brainiac. The group starred in another eponymous limited series, running for eight issues (Metal Men (vol. 3) #1–8 October 2007 – June 2008). David Magnus, another brother of Will and Mike Magnus, attempts to avert a catastrophic future and prevent the creation of the group, and uses a device stolen from the villain T. O. Morrow to change the Metal Men into evil, radioactive versions based on other metals, called the Death Metal Men: Uranium (Iron), Strontium (Mercury), Thorium (Platinum), Radium (Gold), Lithium (Copper), Polonium (Lead), and Fermium (Tin). Doctor Magnus, however, is able to reverse the process and with the Metal Men and the assistance of the alien robot L-Ron, defeat his brother.

The Metal Men also featured in a stand-alone story in the weekly publication Wednesday Comics (#1–12, September–November 2009), and co-starred in the first seven issues of Doom Patrol (vol. 5, October 2009 – April 2010). This series was later reprinted in DC Comics Presents: Metal Men 100 Page Spectacular (2011).

The Metal Men appeared in Justice League: Generation Lost #10–11 (November–December 2010). Captured by villain Maxwell Lord, the Metal Men are reprogrammed and believe themselves to be humans living in a magical fantasy world. At Lord's behest, the brainwashed Metal Men attack the members of the new Justice League International (thinking them monsters), and merge into Alloy, a form introduced in the limited series Kingdom Come (1996).

=== 2010s ===
In The New 52, a 2011 reboot of the DC Comics universe, the Metal Men were created by Doctor Magnus but subsequently disappeared. Cyborg locates Magnus and learns the scientist was tasked by the military with the creation of a rescue team that could enter toxic environments. Although successful, Magnus learns the military intends to use the Metal Men as assassins and the group flees and takes refuge in his apartment. The Metal Men battle Chemo to protect Magnus and are thought to have been destroyed before eventually reappearing in an issue of Swamp Thing.

In 2016, the Metal Men were featured in Legends of Tomorrow, a six-issue anthology series. They were in Nevada fighting off a robot enemy, and the government wanted to destroy the Metal Men and get rid of them as a threat to the people. During a run in with several other heroes, The Metal Men encountered six new Metal Men—Aluminum, Copper, Lithium, Magnesium, Silicon and Zirconium—who were created by the government in a plan to get the original Metal Men back in the military as assassins again. Despite their attempts, the six new robots are eventually destroyed in the conflict.

In the storyline Doomsday Clock, the Metal Men are among the superheroes who head to Mars to confront Doctor Manhattan. Gold, Tin and Platinum are later seen as recruits of the League, to research a multiverse ending threat.

The Metal Men were seen again in a 12-issue miniseries in 2019, with a new metal member to the team that was found at a construction site and called for Magnus. The Metal Men were destroyed by Magnus for trying to rebuild them from scratch again, and again the new one saw a version of himself destroyed. Will Magnus just had had enough of making the Metal Men and he fell in love with a girl, leaving the Metal Men to fend for themselves after having flashbacks of how he had made them up to now. After getting the new metal that they found in Magnus' lab, he helped it out as it called his name. He introduced them to his Metal Man that he had made, and it became part of the team. The new member enjoyed talking to Platinum and it fell in love with her.

== Team roster ==
While there have been a number of different Metal Men members over the course of their history, the original and most common team line-up is Gold, Iron, Lead, Mercury, Platinum, and Tin led by their creator/mentor, scientist Dr. Will Magnus. Occasionally, the roster includes Copper as well.

== Enemies ==
Over the years the Metal Men have fought with a variety of villains such as Dr. Yes, Professor Bravo and his Plastic Perils, Vox The Bionic Bandit, Grid, Chemo, Uranium, Missile Men, Gas Gang, Darzz The Intergalactic Dictator, Radioactive Manta Ray Monster From Space, Alien Fly Monster Fferka, Volcano Man, Sizzler, Von Vroon etc. Many of the team's foes are fellow robots, aliens, evil scientists and other villains.

== Other versions ==
- The Metal Men appear in Kingdom Come. This version of the group possesses the ability to combine into Alloy.
- A possible future incarnation of Platinum appears in Superman: The Man of Steel #1,000,000.
- The Metal Men appear in JLA: The Nail. This version of the group were reprogrammed to behave like conventional robots.
  - The Metal Men appear in JLA: Another Nail, in which their mainstream personalities are restored.
- The Metal Men appear in a self-titled Tangent Comics one-shot. This version of the group are six human operatives led by Marcus Moore and consisting of Samuel Schwartz, Carl Walters, Rey Quinones, Francis Powell, and John Holliday.
- The Metal Men of Earth-44 appear in Final Crisis. This version of the group serve as their universe's Justice League and are led by a human called "Doc Tornado".
- A group based on the Metal Men called the Magnetic Men appear in two comic books released by Amalgam Comics.

== Collected editions ==
Overview of Metal Men-related comics collections
Title	Material collected	Published date	ISBN
The Metal Men Archives Volume 1	Metal Men #1–5, Showcase #37–40	July 2006	978-1401207748
The Metal Men Archives Volume 2	Metal Men #6–20	June 2013	978-1401238674
Showcase Presents: Metal Men Volume 1	Metal Men #1–15, Showcase #37–40, The Brave and the Bold #55	October 2007	978-1401215590
Showcase Presents: Metal Men Volume 2	Metal Men #16–36, The Brave and the Bold #66	September 2008	978-1401219765
Metal Men	Metal Men (vol. 3) #1–8	September 2008	978-1401218454
Metal Men: Full Metal Jacket	Material from Legends of Tomorrow #1–6	December 2016	978-1401265175
Metal Men: Elements of Change	Metal Men (vol. 4) #1–12	April 2021	978-1779508089

== In other media ==
=== Television ===
- Due to the success of The Superman/Aquaman Hour of Adventure from the 1960s, Filmation planned to produce pilots for multiple DC heroes, with one of the concept drawings featuring the Metal Men. Those plans were cancelled when CBS secured the animation rights to Batman following the success of Batman (1966).
- The Metal Men and their combined Alloy form appear in Batman: The Brave and the Bold, with Gold voiced by Lex Lang, Lead by Bill Fagerbakke, Platinum by Hynden Walch, Mercury by Corey Burton, Iron by Brian Bloom, and Tin by Dee Bradley Baker.
- The Metal Men appear in a self-titled segment of DC Nation Shorts, with Gold and Lead voiced by Tom Kenny, Platinum and Tin by Hynden Walch, and Mercury and Iron by Corey Burton.

=== Film ===
- The Metal Men make a cameo appearance in Justice League: The New Frontier.
- Alternate universe versions of the Metal Men appear in Justice League: Gods and Monsters, with Platinum voiced by Grey DeLisle and Tin again by Dee Bradley Baker while the rest are silent. Platinum was created to disguise herself as Will Magnus' wife Tina, Tin serves as Will's butler, and three unnamed Metal Men were designed to mimic the powers of Superman, Batman, and Wonder Woman to frame them for murder so that Magnus could gain access to their technology.
- The Metal Men appear in DC Super Hero Girls: Intergalactic Games, with Lead voiced by Khary Payton, Iron by Greg Cipes, and Platinum again by Grey DeLisle.
- In 2012, Barry Sonnenfeld was in talks with Warner Bros. to make a live-action film about the Metal Men. The film was listed as part of the DC Extended Universe in October 2021.
- As of December 2021, a separate animated Metal Men film is currently in development, with John Musker and Ron Clements directing, producing, and writing the film and Celeste Ballard co-writing.
- The Metal Men make a cameo appearance in Justice League: Crisis on Infinite Earths.

=== Video games ===
- Platinum appears in Lego Batman 3: Beyond Gotham.
- The Metal Men appear in Scribblenauts Unmasked: A DC Comics Adventure.

=== Miscellaneous ===
- Frank Zappa and Captain Beefheart's song "Metal Man Has Won His Wings" is inspired by the Metal Men.
- The Metal Men appear in Batman Beyond (vol. 2). This version of the group was created by Will Magnus after he was forcibly recruited into Project Cadmus years prior. Refusing to help them, Magnus deactivated the Metal Men, destroyed their bodies, and gave their responsometers to people that he trusted. In the 2040s, the organization Undercloud, led by the anarchist Rebel-1, locate and reactivate the Metal Men until Batman and his friend Max Gibson free them. Bruce Wayne later informs the Metal Men of Magnus' fate, convinces them to continue his dream of protecting Earth, and gives them the Injustice Gang's former satellite to use as their own headquarters.
