= Will Magnus =

Fictional DC Comics universe character

- Will Magnus as depicted in 52 #49 (April 2007). Art by J.G. Jones.

Publication information
- Publisher: DC Comics
- First appearance: Showcase #37 (April 1962)
- Created by: Robert Kanigher (writer); Ross Andru (artist)

In-story information
- Alter ego: Dr. William Maxwell "Will" Magnus
- Species: Human
- Team affiliations: Metal Men; Doom Patrol; Science Squad
- Notable aliases: Veridium
- Abilities: Genius-level intellect; Proficient scientist and inventor; Expert strategist and tactician

Doctor William Maxwell "Will" Magnus is a fictional character appearing in American comic books published by DC Comics. A brilliant scientist who occasionally suffers from debilitating mental illness, he is responsible for creating the Metal Men and serves as a general robotics expert among the superhero community. Magnus first appeared in Showcase #37 (April 1962), and was created by Robert Kanigher and Ross Andru.

Magnus has been adapted into various media outside comics, including television series and films. He has been voiced by Corey Burton, C. Thomas Howell, Townsend Coleman, Phil LaMarr, and Alan Tudyk.

== Fictional character biography ==
Will Magnus is an esteemed scientist and the creator of the Metal Men, who possess a form of artificial intelligence derived from "responsometers". The method through which Doc Magnus created the Metal Men has varied over years with various writers. Initially, the Metal Men were blank slates equipped with responsometers, devices which generated their intelligence and personalities.

In an attempt to boost sales of the comic book, the characters underwent vast changes. The Metal Men assumed human alter egos, while Magnus became a fugitive scientist dedicated to global conquest. His personality change was credited to having been kidnapped, reawakened, and brainwashed by a mad dictator. Sales plunged instead and the comic was not printed for a few years. Eventually, Metal Men was picked up again with Magnus's sanity restored and he returned to assist his Metal Men.

The 1993 Metal Men miniseries reveals that the responsometers were not responsible for the Metal Men's sentience and that the Metal Men were imprinted with the intellects and personalities of real people during a lab accident. At the climax of the miniseries, Gold is killed and Magnus mortally wounded. Magnus transfers his consciousness into the green robot Veridium and becomes the leader of the Metal Men.

=== 52 ===
Following the 2005–2006 "Infinite Crisis" storyline, which retconned several aspects of DC's history, the "blank robots with responsometers" origin is stated to be the Metal Men's definitive origin, while the "human personalities" origin and the 1993 miniseries are described as the byproduct of a mental breakdown suffered by Magnus.

The responsometers are now described as containing an "artificial soul" invented by Doc Magnus, as inspired by T. O. Morrow, who is revealed to have taught him at college and to have been the only one not to laugh at Magnus' theories. After the unexplained dismantling of the Metal Men, Magnus is unable to recreate these souls and restore their personalities. He now takes Prozac for the bipolar disorder which caused his nervous breakdown and the depression which led to the creation of the Plutonium Man, a tremendous, nearly indestructible superweapon based upon the Metal Men, but with Magnus' then-own deranged, twisted worldview as its operating system. It is implied that although the medication is keeping Magnus from doing anything irrational, it is also deadening his imagination and creativity and that this is the reason that he cannot recreate the Metal Men.

Magnus is assigned to design and construct a new Plutonium Man robot, but deliberately makes little progress, saying to Morrow that the original Plutonium Man was an expression of his pain and rage brought on by his mental illness and that the reason that he takes his medication is to prevent himself from doing something like that again. Morrow reveals this to the Island's leaders and Magnus's medication is confiscated.

Magnus then proceeds to work on the Plutonium Man, saying that this time he will "do it right". Though he is unstable due to his lack of medication, Magnus is not fully co-operating with Chang Tzu. Magnus goes about scavenging materials from various items, which allows him to reconstruct his Metal Men, albeit only a few inches tall. These new Metal Men help Magnus remain sane despite being off his medicine.

=== Metal Men (2009) ===
The Metal Men appear as a backup feature in the revamped Doom Patrol (5th series), written by Keith Giffen. Now living in suburbia in Kanigher Street, the Metal Men seem to be affected by his currently partly deranged state of mind. Iron seems unaffected, Gold is now humorously self-obsessed and magniloquent, Platina is lovesick, Lead is dimwitted and prone to errors, Tin is always scared and affected by chronic self-esteem issues, and Mercury, once brilliant and humorous, has now developed the same bipolar disturbance affecting Magnus himself, and refuses to take medications. Copper, the newest and seventh member, is disturbingly ignored by her teammates, who often refuse to acknowledge her presence despite being side by side with her.

=== The New 52 ===
In The New 52 timeline, Will Magnus is first mentioned in the Forever Evil storyline. A rebuilt Cyborg heads out to find Will Magnus so that he can learn about his "Metal Men" project. Meeting with Will Magnus, Cyborg learns that he can not help him. Magnus tells him the history of the Metal Men project, how they were built to execute search and rescue missions that humans could not tackle. After he was able to get them online, the government went back on their word and chose to have the Metal Men become assassins. The Metal Men hid at Magnus' apartment, where they help protect Magnus and the population from an experiment gone wrong, destroying themselves in the process. Seeing their responsometers that control them in Magnus' lab, Cyborg senses that their minds and hearts are still active, encouraging Magnus to reactivate them.

When Conner Kent arrives asking for help, Superman gathers all the geniuses he knows, with Will Magnus being among them. After examining Conner, the group finds evidence that the universe has been rebooted at least three times.

== Powers and abilities ==
Normally, Will Magnus had no special abilities aside from his great intellect. His vast intelligence was responsible for the creation of the Metal Men, along with various other robots.

As Veridium, Magnus can manipulate heat and energy.

== Other versions ==
An alternate universe version of Will Magnus, with elements of Bolivar Trask, appears in the Amalgam Comics one-shot Magneto & the Magnetic Men.

== In other media ==
=== Television ===
- Will Magnus, renamed Milton Magnus, appears in Batman: The Brave and the Bold, voiced by Corey Burton. This version previously worked with several other scientists before they were presumed dead in a lab accident and became the Gas Gang. Initially unaware of his colleagues' evil motives, Magnus built the Metal Men to continue their legacy.
- Will Magnus appears in the "Metal Men" segment of DC Nation Shorts, voiced again by Corey Burton.
- Will Magnus appears in flashbacks in the Creature Commandos episode "Cheers to the Tin Man", voiced by Alan Tudyk. This version was primarily active in the 1960s.

=== Film ===
- Will Magnus appears in Justice League: The New Frontier, voiced by Townsend Coleman.
- An alternate reality version of Will Magnus appears in Justice League: Gods and Monsters, voiced by C. Thomas Howell. This version is a friend of Kirk Langstrom who attempted to help him create a serum to cure the latter's cancer, only to inadvertently turn Langstrom into a pseudo-vampire. A year after this, Magnus accidentally beat his wife Tina to death after realizing she preferred Langstrom over him. This caused Magnus to lose faith in humanity and attempt to end all human conflict. In the present, he creates three Metal Men to frame the Justice League for the deaths of various scientists and connect the minds of every human on Earth using nanites. However, Lex Luthor discovers and reveals Magnus' plan to the League and the U.S. military, allowing them to stop him. With his plan foiled, a regretful Magnus disintegrates himself with a nanite sphere.
- Will Magnus appears in DC Super Hero Girls: Intergalactic Games, voiced by Phil LaMarr.

=== Video games ===
- Will Magnus appears in DC Universe Online as a vendor in the Watchtower's Tech Wing.
- Will Magnus appears as a character summon in Scribblenauts Unmasked: A DC Comics Adventure.

=== Miscellaneous ===
- Will Magnus appears in DC Super Hero Girls, voiced by Phil LaMarr.
- Will Magnus appears in Smallville Season 11.
