= Kristopher Carter =

American composer

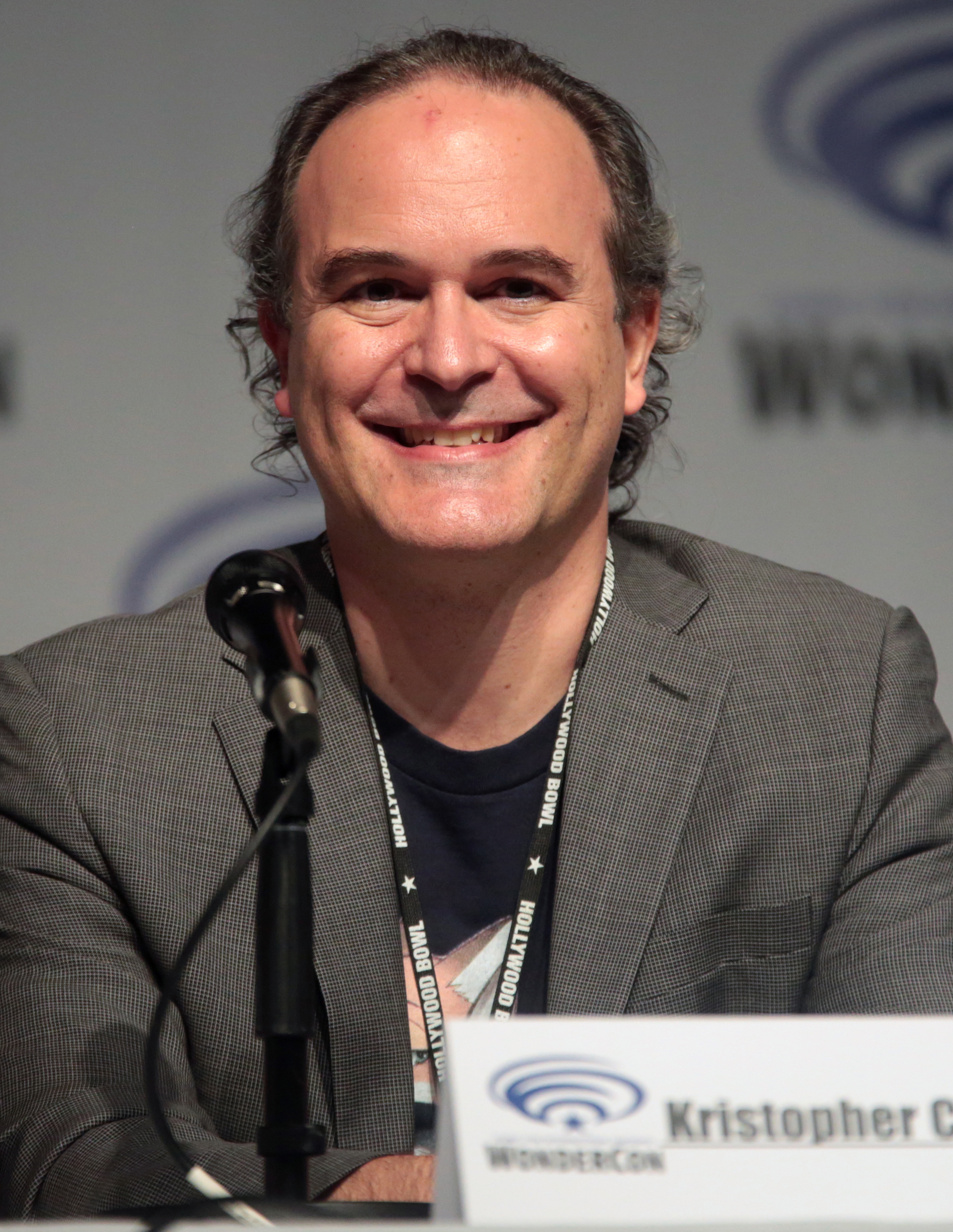
- Carter at the 2017 WonderCon

Background information
- Born: Kristopher Lee Carter; February 5, 1972 (age 54); San Antonio, Texas, U.S.
- Occupations: Composer; Conductor; music arranger; Record producer; DJ
- Instruments: Keyboard
- Years active: 1994–present
- Website: http://www.kristophercarter.com/

Kristopher Lee Carter (born February 5, 1972) is an American composer. He grew up in San Angelo, Texas and lives in Los Angeles, California.

Carter was born in San Antonio, Texas. In 1993, he graduated magna cum laude from the University of North Texas. As a student, he won first prize in the 1992 UNT Concerto/Aria competition with his symphonic overture, A Titan's Epitaph. The University of North Texas Symphony Orchestra, under the direction of Anshel Brusilow, first performed the overture in 1993. After that, Carter received commissions for concert works from cellist Carter Enyeart, saxophonist Robert Austin and the University of North Texas Men's Chorus in 1994. The work commissioned by Austin, Grand Duo Concertante, has been featured on several nationally syndicated college radio programs In 1995.

Carter began his career as one of the youngest composers to work for Warner Bros. He received an Emmy Award for Batman Beyond and has received five other Emmy nominations. His fifteen independent feature films have screened at festivals including South by Southwest, Slamdance, the Atlanta Film Festival, Shriekfest and the 2008 Park City Film Music Festival, where his feature "Yesterday Was A Lie" won a Gold Medal for Best Impact Of Music In A Feature Film.

He made his Hollywood Bowl debut in 2001 with a commission from John Mauceri and the Hollywood Bowl Orchestra. In the record world, he has collaborated with The Wallflowers' Rami Jaffee and blues guitarist Kenny Wayne Shepherd. Carter was named Commissioning Composer of the Year by the Texas Music Teachers Association and also received a fellowship to Robert Redford's Sundance Composers Institute. He served as the first Composer-In-Residence of the Bel Canto Northwest Opera Festival and has given clinics across the country on film composition.

== Works ==
=== DC Animated Universe ===
Year	Title	Note
1994–95	Batman: The Animated Series	The series made its debut in 1992, while Carter came in 1994 ^{a}
1996–2000	Superman: The Animated Series	^{a}
1997–99	The New Batman Adventures	^{a}
1999–2001	Batman Beyond	^{a}^{c}
2001	Batman Beyond: Return of the Joker	^{b}
2001–02	The Zeta Project	^{a}^{c}
2001–04	Justice League	^{a}
2004–06	Justice League Unlimited	^{a}
2017	Batman and Harley Quinn	^{a}
2019	Justice League vs. the Fatal Five	^{a}

=== Other DC Animated Works ===
Year	Title	Note
2003–06	Teen Titans	^{a}
2006	Teen Titans: Trouble in Tokyo	^{a}
2006–08	Legion of Super Heroes	^{a}^{c}
2008–10	Batman: The Brave and the Bold	^{a}^{c}
2010–22	Young Justice	^{a}
2016	Batman: The Killing Joke	^{a}
2016	Batman: Return of the Caped Crusaders	^{a}
2017	Batman vs. Two-Face	^{a}
2020	DC Showcase: The Phantom Stranger	

=== Marvel animated works ===
Year	Title	Note
2008–09	Spectacular Spider-Man	^{a}
2012–19	Avengers Assemble	^{a}
2018	Marvel Rising: Initiation	^{a}
2018	Marvel Rising: Secret Warriors	^{a}
2019	Marvel Rising: Chasing Ghosts	^{a}
2019	Marvel Rising: Heart of Iron	^{a}
2019	Marvel Rising: Operation Shuri	^{a}
2019	Marvel Rising: Playing with Fire	^{a}

=== Other animated works ===
Year	Title	Note
2008–10	Ben 10: Alien Force	^{a}
2010–12	Ben 10: Ultimate Alien	^{a}
2012	Ben 10: Destroy All Aliens	^{a}
2012	Scooby-Doo! Mask of the Blue Falcon	^{a}
2017	Scooby-Doo! Shaggy's Showdown	^{a}
2018	Scooby-Doo! & Batman: The Brave and the Bold	^{a}
2023	Babylon 5: The Road Home	^{a}

=== Other works ===
Year	Title	Note
2016	Siren	^{b}

- ^aThis work that was composed with other music composers, especially with Michael McCuistion and Lolita Ritmanis.
- ^bThe work was composed solely by Carter.
- ^cThe work that has theme song composed by Carter.
