= Scooby-Doo! & Batman: The Brave and the Bold =

- DVD cover
- Directed by: Jake Castorena
- Screenplay by: Paul Giacoppo
- Story by: James Tucker; Michael Jelenic; Kaz (uncredited)
- Based on: Scooby-Doo by William Hanna, Joseph Barbera, Iwao Takamoto, Joe Ruby, & Ken Spears Batman by Bob Kane, Bill Finger, & DC Comics Batman: The Brave and the Bold by James Tucker, Michael Jelenic, & DC Comics
- Produced by: Michael Jelenic
- Starring: Frank Welker; Grey DeLisle; Kate Micucci; Matthew Lillard; Diedrich Bader
- Edited by: Christopher D. Lozinski; Molly Yahr
- Music by: Michael McCuistion; Lolita Ritmanis; Kristopher Carter
- Production companies: Warner Bros. Animation; DC Entertainment
- Distributed by: Warner Bros. Home Entertainment
- Release dates: January 6, 2018 (TCL Chinese Theatre); January 9, 2018 (DVD and digital)
- Running time: 75 minutes
- Country: United States
- Language: English

Scooby-Doo! & Batman: The Brave and the Bold is a 2018 American animated direct-to-video superhero action comedy film produced by Warner Bros. Animation and distributed by Warner Bros. Home Entertainment, and the thirtieth entry in the direct-to-video series of Scooby-Doo films. The film is a crossover between Scooby-Doo and Batman: The Brave and the Bold. The film involves Scooby-Doo and his friends teaming with Batman and other DC Comics superheroes in order to defeat a new villain. Most of the cast from the series reprised their roles (including Diedrich Bader as Batman), although a few roles were re-cast with other actors from different DC projects. The film premiered at the TCL Chinese Theatre on January 6, 2018, and was released on DVD and digitally on January 9.

== Plot ==
As Mystery Incorporated investigates a series of thefts by the ghost of Puppetto the Puppeteer and his puppet, Batman shows up. Fred manages to capture Puppetto and the puppet, and Mystery Inc. deduces them to be Martian Manhunter and Detective Chimp. Batman reveals it was all a test for them to join the Mystery Analysts of Gotham City, which they accept. Unbeknownst to the heroes, they are observed by a red-cloaked figure.

A week later, Batman foils a gold robbery by Riddler, Catwoman, and Killer Croc with help from the Question and Aquaman. Aquaman expresses interest in joining the Analysts, but is rejected for not being a detective. Mystery Inc. arrives at the Analysts' headquarters, meeting Question, Black Canary and Plastic Man, as well as a tagalong Aquaman. When an alarm sounds from Gotham Chemical Storage, the Analysts head for the warehouse, finding that several vials of a radioactive isotope have been stolen. The red-cloaked figure appears, declaring himself to be the Crimson Cloak, and swears revenge on Batman and Gotham for making him into a ghost. Crimson Cloak sets the storage on fire, but the Analysts escape.

Believing it to be connected to the Crimson Cloak, Batman discloses his single unsolved case; during his first year of crime-fighting, he attempted to stop Professor Milo from experimenting with an unstable teleporter but was unable to stop the death of one of Milo's assistants, Leo Scarlett. Batman and Mystery Inc. deduces that the Riddler is involved after Daphne discovers he was Milo's second assistant under an alias. Following this lead, Batman and Mystery Inc. travel to Arkham Asylum, where Riddler confirms their suspicions and advises them to check Arkham's cemetery. As they leave, Crimson Cloak releases Clock King, Harley Quinn, Killer Croc, Mr. Freeze, Poison Ivy, Mad Hatter, King Tut, Bookworm, Scarecrow and Two-Face from their cells, although Batman manages to re-imprison them.

At the cemetery, Batman and Mystery Inc. discover a clay footprint inside its mausoleum, but Harvey Bullock and the Analysts attempt to arrest them after the stolen isotope was planted in the Mystery Machine. Batman and Mystery Inc. flee into "No Man's Land" where they run into Bane, Blockbuster, Joker, and Penguin. The group escapes and go to the Batcave. Batman leaves to investigate Milo's laboratory where Aquaman and Question join Batman to find the teleporter restored by Crimson Cloak. Crimson Cloak attacks, seemingly killing Question and capturing Batman and Aquaman. In the Batcave, Velma attempts to analyze the clay footprint only for it to come to life and attack. After overcoming it using a Bat-Dehydrator, they deduce the Crimson Cloak's true identity for themselves.

Realizing that the Cloak has captured Batman, Mystery Inc. equips themselves with the old costumes and gadgets of Batman and his former sidekicks, and arrives to save Batman. Crimson Cloak shapeshifts into Batman's other enemies to stop them, but Mystery Inc. incapacitate him with the Dehydrator and shut down the teleporter. Mystery Inc. exposes the Cloak as Clayface, who committed the crimes in exchange for a cure for the gradual decay of his body, and is taken to Blackgate Penitentiary. Batman deduces that Riddler hired Clayface, leaving a clay duplicate of himself in Arkham. He then unmasks Question to reveal Riddler, having realized that he swapped places with the real Question from Aquaman's observations.

Now exposed, Riddler escapes into the lab, followed by Mystery Inc and the Analysts. He reactivates the teleporter and prepares to use it to destroy Gotham, only to be knocked out by the real Question. The vortex grows out of control, but at the same time, a human shape manifests in it. Working together, Mystery Inc. and the Analysts reverse the device's polarity and free the figure before it self-destructs. The figure is revealed to be Leo Scarlett, who was trapped in an inter-dimensional void, and is now finally reunited with his father. Riddler and his henchmen are arrested by the police, while Batman thanks Mystery Inc. for their help before taking off into the night.

== Voice cast ==
- Frank Welker as Scooby-Doo, Fred Jones
- Grey DeLisle as Daphne Blake, Black Canary
- Matthew Lillard as Shaggy Rogers
- Kate Micucci as Velma Dinkley
- Diedrich Bader as Batman
- John Michael Higgins as Riddler
- Jeffrey Combs as Question
- John DiMaggio as Aquaman, Crimson Cloak
- Nika Futterman as Catwoman
- Nicholas Guest as Martian Manhunter
- Jeff Bennett as Joker
- Tom Kenny as Penguin, Plastic Man
- Kevin Michael Richardson as Clayface, Detective Chimp
- Tara Strong as Harley Quinn, Poison Ivy
- Fred Tatasciore as Det. Harvey Bullock

== Reception ==
A positive review for the website Den of Geek praised the film, but criticised its length and final sequence. IGN also found the film entertaining but states that it will probably disappoint DC fans who are used to darker atmospheres. A review for SciFi Pulse gave the film an honorable mention, stating among other things that "the title (was) the plot".
