= Clock King =

Multiple fictional characters, supervillains published by DC Comics

- William Tockman as the Clock King, taken from a splash page of Batman: Killing Time #5 (July 2022), published by DC Comics. Art by David Marquez and colors by Alejandro Sánchez.

Publication information
- Publisher: DC Comics
- First appearance: (William Tockman); World's Finest Comics #111 (August 1960) (Fugate); Batman: The Animated Series "The Clock King" (September 21, 1992) (Tem); Teen Titans #56 (April 2008) (Billy Tockman); Green Arrow (2011) #22 (September 2013)
- Created by: (William Tockman); France Herron (writer); Lee Elias (artist) (Fugate); David Wise (writer) (Tem); Sean McKeever (writer); Eddy Burrows (artist) (Billy Tockman); Jeff Lemire (writer); Andrea Sorrentino (artist)

In-story information
- Alter ego: William Tockman - Tem - Temple Fugate - Billy Tockman
- Species: Human
- Team affiliations: (William Tockman); Injustice League; Justice League Antarctica; Longbow Hunters; Time Foes; Suicide Squad (Fugate); Task Force X (Tem); Terror Titans (Billy Tockman); His gang (formerly Queen Industries)
- Notable aliases: (William Tockman); King Clock; Tempus Fugit (Tem) (Fugate) (Billy Tockman)
- Abilities: (William Tockman); Uses clock-related gadgetry Accomplished swordsman Genius-level intellect (Fugate); Tactical Analysis; Swordsmanship (Tem); Absolute time sense Genius-level intellect (Billy Tockman); Criminal mastermind Mechanical Engineering

The Clock King is the name of primarily three supervillains appearing in American comic books published by DC Comics. The first Clock King debuted in World's Finest Comics #111 (August 1960), and was created by France Herron and Lee Elias.

The Clock Kings, mainly William Tockman, have appeared in several media adaptations, such as Batman (1966), portrayed by Walter Slezak; and Arrowverse TV series, portrayed by Robert Knepper. Additionally, an original incarnation, Temple Fugate, appears in shows set in the DC Animated Universe, voiced by Alan Rachins.

== Publication history ==
The first Clock King was originally an enemy of Green Arrow. He has no superpowers or abilities. He wears a clock mask, a cape, and a blue suit with clock drawings on it.

Clock King is a master planner and sometimes uses clock-themed gadgetry. The Clock King became better known more recently by his appearances in Justice League International and Suicide Squad.

== Fictional character biography ==
=== William Tockman ===
Encyclopedic illustration of the First Clock King by Dan Spiegle.

Born William Tockman, the Clock King spends his early years taking care of his invalid sister. During one day, he finds out from a doctor's visit that he himself only has six months to live. Despairing for his sister's future, he watches the timing of a local bank's vault to rob it, hoping the money would provide for his sister after he was gone. His caper would have gone successfully, had he not tripped a silent alarm and been caught by Green Arrow.

While he is incarcerated, his sister dies alone. In further and hideous irony, Tockman discovers that really he is not terminally ill: his doctor had accidentally switched his papers with those of another patient. Infuriated, he escapes, later futilely attempting revenge on both Green Arrow and the incompetent doctor.

With several other villains, the Clock King becomes a member of the Injustice League, a team of out-of-luck supervillains who, when banding together, become even less successful than they have been in their individual careers. Trying to reform, the members later become the core of the equally laughable hero team Justice League Antarctica. Like his compatriots, Clock King becomes a supporter of Maxwell Lord, partly due to the fact he is the only one willing to hire them. His group even guards Lord when he is incapacitated by a bullet wound. The villains again later reunite as the Injustice League as henchmen of Sonar.

Later, the Clock King leads his own separate team of villains in a mission. They consist of Radiant, Sharpe, Acidia, and Crackle. They are not as well-organized as even the Injustice League. For example, Crackle still lives with his mother and they have to take the bus to a fight at a Metropolis toy store. The villains end up fighting one of the Teen Titans, Booster Gold, Firehawk, and Cameron Chase. An unclear super-effect from Chase ultimately neutralizes Clock King's team and they are all imprisoned. Clock King himself escapes on another bus.

Still later, Clock King and his Injustice League friends are recruited into the new Suicide Squad. They are sent to a remote research facility where a genetic monstrosity is holding its creator hostage. Its main defenses are spawned "children" that could explode. During the mission, most of the team are seemingly killed, including Clock King, who is shot repeatedly in a retreat attempt. He is seen still alive after his brutal wounds but, in the end, Major Disaster believes he is the only one who survives. It turns out Cluemaster, shot in a similar manner as Clock King, survives, albeit with drastic scarring. Multi-Man also survives due to his ability to be reborn with new powers after dying.

=== Tem ===
A new Clock King appears in Teen Titans #56 as the head of a team of villains named the Terror Titans. In an interview with Teen Titans writer Sean McKeever, he described this Clock King as "... Very smart. He sees things differently than others". His costume is similar to the suit worn by the Clock King seen in Batman: The Animated Series, although lacking a hat and having clock faces on his tie. Also evocative of the Animated Series, Disruptor refers to him as "Tem" before being killed; after his group defeats and captures Kid Devil, Clock King conditions the hero to be sold as a fighter to a group called the Dark Side Club. Clock King then brings the Titans to his base of operations, a dimension outside of time. After besting Robin, Clock King is stymied by Ravager, who possesses similar precognitive abilities. He offers Ravager a chance to join him, but she refuses. Clock King then removes the Titans from his base and decides to move on to new plans. Ravager ultimately reconsiders his earlier offer. In the Terror Titans miniseries, Clock King takes over the Dark Side Club, and uses it to brainwash young metahumans, turning them into his "Martyr Militia". He sends the Militia to attack Los Angeles, for no reason other than to amuse him. Clock King's plans are eventually undone by Miss Martian, who was posing as one of the captured metahumans, and Ravager, who attacks and defeats him, forcing him to flee his base of operations.

=== Billy Tockman ===
In 2011, "The New 52" rebooted the DC universe. Billy Tockman is an African-American crime boss based in Seattle. Tockman owns a nightclub called the Midnight Lounge, and vintage clock repair shop called the Clock King, which he uses as a front for his operations. While Green Arrow is off dealing with the Outsiders, Naomi Singh and Henry Fyff talk Tockman into taking down Richard Dragon, to which he agrees. When they meet to take down Dragon, Tockman betrays them, claiming Dragon made a better offer. When Green Arrow returns and faces Dragon, he holds Naomi and Fyff at gunpoint on Dragon's orders and ends up shooting Fyff, then promptly getting beat up and knocked out by Emiko Queen.

In 2016, DC Comics implemented a relaunch of its books called DC Rebirth, which restored its continuity to a form much as it was prior to "The New 52". Billy Tockman is depicted as a former engineer and drug dealer who sports a tattoo of a clock and arrow on the side of his head. He wires targets to clocks that can kill the wearer. In addition, Tockman used to work at Queen Industries until he was fired by Robert Queen.

=== Birds of Prey villain ===
In 2011, "The New 52" rebooted the DC universe. Another Clock King, wearing the original Clock King costume, battles the newest incarnation of the Birds of Prey amped up on Venom.

In the DC Rebirth continuity, Clock King claims to be a temporal anomaly and feeds on the life force of others to maintain his youth, which led to him preying on African citizens. He is sheltered within the African nation of Buredunia under dictator Matthew Bland. Deathstroke is assigned to kill Clock King, but ultimately spares his life.

=== Bill ===
In 2011, "The New 52" rebooted the DC universe. Another Clock King, bearing an appearance similar to his Batman: The Animated Series counterpart, tries to rob a store alongside his roommate Sportsmaster, who calls him Bill and claims to be William Tockman. He is stopped by Harley Quinn and Power Girl, but not before teleporting them into another dimension. Clock King and Sportsmaster were later recruited into the Suicide Squad.

== Powers and abilities ==
The William Tockman version of Clock King has no metahuman powers or abilities, although he is athletic and extraordinarily smart.

The Tem version of Clock King is able to see several seconds into the future, allowing him to anticipate an opponent's every move. He is also a technological genius, creating devices such as teleporters, communications jamming equipment, and even an anti-gravity platform, all modeled after timepieces.

The Billy Tockman version of Clock King possesses genius-level intellect.

The fourth unidentified Clock King possesses flight and chronokinesis. He is also an expert at hand-to-hand combat.

The Bill version of Clock King is an expert at swordsmanship and hand-to-hand combat. He is also an expert biologist as seen when he successfully identified a Gamorran cuckoo dove.

=== Equipment ===
The William Tockman version of Clock King extensively uses clock and time-related gimmicks to devastating effect.

The Billy Tockman version of Clock King wields clock and watch-related gimmicks. He also formerly made use of a time machine.

The Bill version of Clock King also wields a time-travel pocket watch and a teleportation ring.

== Other versions ==
- An unidentified incarnation, referred to as "Mr. Clock King" is seen in Tiny Titans, in which he is a teacher at Sidekick City Elementary.
- An unidentified alternate universe version of Clock King appears in "Flashpoint". This version is an inmate of the military Doom prison before breaking out alongside Heat Wave and Plastic Man.

== In other media ==
=== Television ===
==== Live-action ====
Walter Slezak as the Clock King as he appears in Batman (1966)

- An original incarnation of the Clock King, named Morris Tetch, appears in the Batman (1966) consecutive episodes "The Clock King's Crazy Crimes" and "The Clock King Gets Crowned", portrayed by Walter Slezak. This version wears a black cape and a top hat with a clock inside it. Furthermore, he wields weapons such as "Super Slick Watch Oil", "Knock Out Gas", and "Super Sonic Sound".

Robert Knepper as William Tockman as he appears in Arrow

- The William Tockman incarnation of the Clock King appears in TV series set in the Arrowverse, portrayed by Robert Knepper.
  - Tockman first appears in the Arrow episode "Time of Death", in which he masterminds the theft of a hacking device that can be used to break into bank vaults and computer systems to raise money for his dying sister, Beverly's, medical treatment. He later hacks into Felicity Smoak's computer system and disables it, leading to her getting involved in the Arrow's efforts to capture him and personally defeating Tockman herself.
  - Tockman returns in The Flash episode "Power Outage". After being temporarily transferred to the Central City Police Department's custody, he takes advantage of a citywide blackout to take everyone inside hostage. However, Iris West grabs Officer Eddie Thawne's gun beforehand and wounds Tockman with it before the Flash arrives to help.

==== Animation ====
Temple Fugate / The Clock King as depicted in Batman: The Animated Series.

- An original incarnation of the Clock King named, Temple Fugate (a play on the Latin phrase "tempus fugit"), appears in series set in the DC Animated Universe (DCAU), voiced by Alan Rachins. This version is obsessed with time and punctuality, pre-planning his every waking moment on a to-do list and breaking them down into precise blocks. He was given an original design unlike his past counter-parts. "We originally intended it to suggest a stiff-upper-lip British gentleman. When the show came back, he was wearing brown. It ruined it for me. He just looks like a normal guy, not a supervillain." Bruce Timm once said, this design and deviations of it have continually been used later on in multiple comics.
  - Introduced in a self-titled episode of Batman: The Animated Series, Fugate served as the head of a time and motion study consulting company that was fined $20 million in court and was in the midst of his last appeal against the verdict. Future Gotham mayor Hamilton Hill convinced Fugate to break his schedule and take his coffee break at a slightly later time, warning Fugate that the judge may consider his stress a sign of suspicious behavior. However, due to a string of bad luck, Fugate arrived late for his court appointment, lost his appeal, and went bankrupt as a result. He later learned that Hill's firm represented the plaintiff for the case and subsequently swore revenge on Hill for making him late. Seven years later, Fugate becomes the Clock King and dedicates his life to destroying Hill. After publicly shaming him, Fugate confronts Batman and falls to his apparent death. In the episode "Time Out of Joint", Fugate resurfaces and continue seeking revenge against Hill using a stolen device that allows him to manipulate time. Nevertheless, Batman and Robin foil his plans and Fugate is sent to Stonegate Penitentiary.
  - Fugate returns in the Justice League Unlimited episode "Task Force X". After serving time, Project Cadmus recruits him into the eponymous group to assist in a mission to steal the Annihilator automaton from the Justice League by acting as radio support and coordinating the mission's timing.
- The William Tockman incarnation of the Clock King appears in Batman: The Brave and the Bold, voiced by Dee Bradley Baker. This version possesses clock-themed weaponry and gadgets and employs two henchmen named Tick and Tock.
  - Additionally, an unnamed, heroic, alternate universe version of the Clock King makes a cameo appearance in the episode "Deep Cover for Batman!".
- The William Tockman incarnation of the Clock King appears in Harley Quinn, voiced by James Adomian. This version resembles his Batman: The Brave and the Bold counterpart and is engaged to the Riddler.

=== Film ===
- The Batman (1966) incarnation of the Clock King appears in Batman: Return of the Caped Crusaders.
- The William Tockman incarnation of the Clock King appears in The Lego Batman Movie.
- The William Tockman incarnation of the Clock King appears in Scooby-Doo! & Batman: The Brave and the Bold.

=== Video games ===
- The William Tockman incarnation of the Clock King appears as a boss in Batman: The Brave and the Bold – The Videogame, voiced again by Dee Bradley Baker.
- The William Tockman incarnation of the Clock King appears as a character summon in Scribblenauts Unmasked: A DC Comics Adventure.
- The William Tockman incarnation of the Clock King appears as a playable character in Lego DC Super-Villains, voiced again by Dee Bradley Baker. This version is a member of the Legion of Doom.
- The William Tockman incarnation of the Clock King makes a cameo appearance as a non-player character (NPC) in Lego Batman: Legacy of the Dark Knight.

=== Miscellaneous ===
- The Batman (1966) incarnation of the Clock King appears in Batman '66. He is revealed to be Morris Tetch, the brother of Jervis Tetch / Mad Hatter who created the latter's weapons. Morris describes himself and Jervis as "meticulous obsessives".
- The DCAU incarnation of Temple Fugate / Clock King appears in The Batman Adventures, in which he stalks and succeeds in getting revenge on Hamilton Hill by rigging a mayoral election so the latter's opponent Penguin can win.
- The William Tockman incarnation of the Clock King appears in Batman: The Brave and the Bold.
- The Temple Fugate incarnation of Clock King appears in L'il Gotham.
- The Temple Fugate version of Clock King makes a cameo appearance in Injustice: Gods Among Us, and re-appears in Injustice 2 as a member of the Suicide Squad until he is killed by Jason Todd.
- The Temple Fugate incarnation of Clock King is the narrator for Batman: Killing Time, but only appears in the latter part of the story.
- The DCAU incarnation of Temple Fugate / Clock King makes cameo appearances in Batman: The Adventures Continue.
- The Harley Quinn incarnation of William Tockman / Clock King appears in Harley Quinn: The Animated Series.

=== Merchandise ===
- In February 2009, Mattel released an action figure of the DCAU incarnation of Temple Fugate / Clock King in the Justice League Unlimited toyline in a Matty Collector exclusive four-pack along with Bane, Harley Quinn, and Scarecrow.
- In 2018, Lego released a minifigure of The Lego Batman Movie incarnation of Clock King.
- In April 2026, McFarlane Toys released a Target-exclusive Build-A-Figure wave for the DCAU incarnation of Temple Fugate / Clock King.
