= Lolita Ritmanis =

American composer (born 1962)

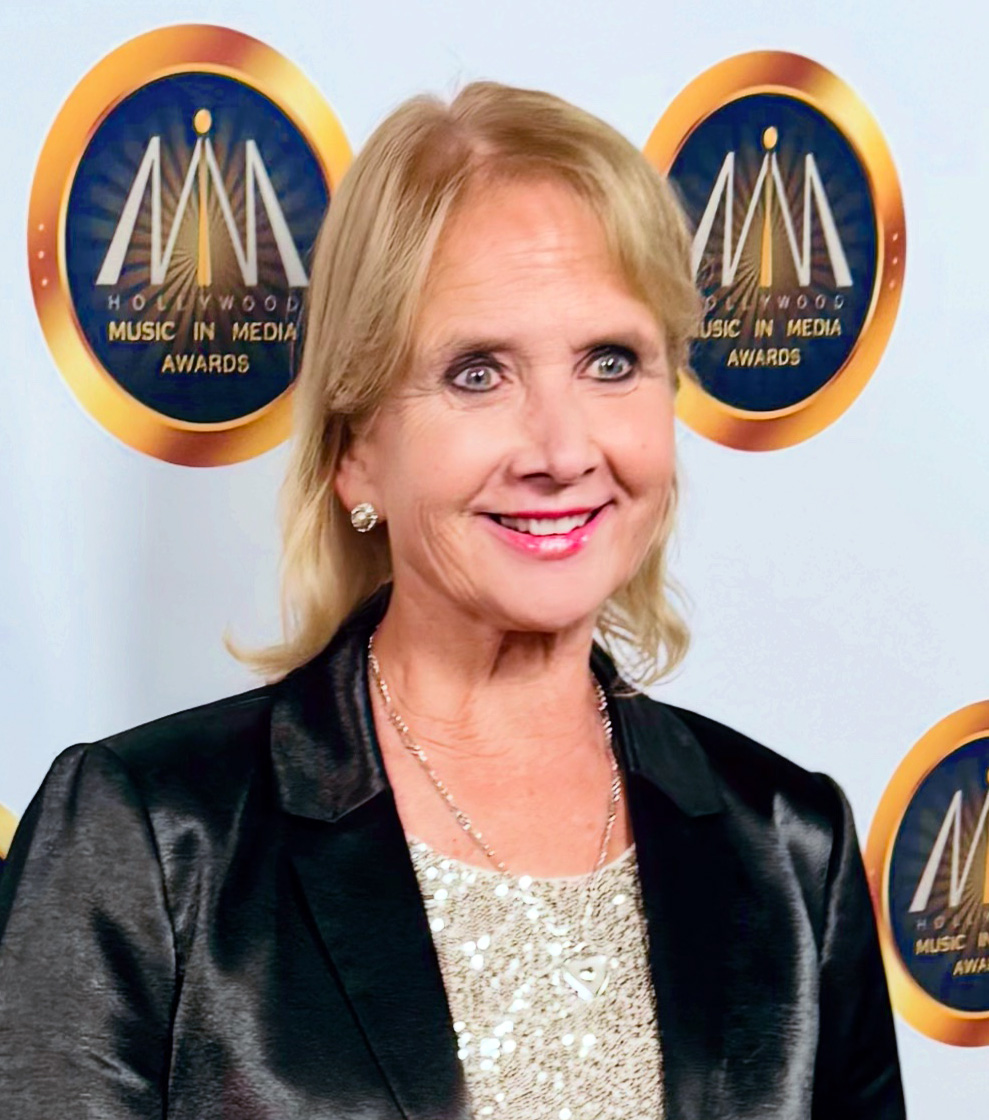
- Ritmanis at HMMA Awards 2025

Background information
- Born: November 1, 1962 (age 64); Portland, Oregon, U.S.
- Origin: Latvian
- Genres: Film score; Television score; Classical
- Occupation: Composer

Lolita Ritmanis (born November 1, 1962) is a Latvian-American composer, known for her film and television scores, including her work on the animated series Batman Beyond.

== Early life ==
Born on November 1, 1962, in Portland, Oregon, Ritmanis is the daughter of Andris Ritmanis and Asja Ritmanis, who fled Latvia during World War II and immigrated to the United States in 1949. Ritmanis has a sister, Brigita Ritmanis-Jameson, and a brother, Alberts Ritmanis.

Throughout her childhood, Ritmanis studied piano, flute, guitar, and voice, performing in both jazz and classical music ensembles. Ritmanis composed her first song at age 11. By age 16, she had toured the United States, Canada, Europe, Australia and New Zealand, composing for and performing with the Latvian popular music group Dzintars. Latvian song festivals throughout the world provided Ritmanis with the opportunity to conduct and perform her works before larger audiences.

Ritmanis graduated from Cleveland High School in Portland, Oregon in 1980. She moved to Los Angeles to study at the Dick Grove School Of Music, where she graduated from both the Composition Program and the Film Music Composition Program. At the Dick Grove School, Ritmanis studied with composers Dick Grove, Mundell Lowe, Lalo Schifrin, Henry Mancini, Allyn Ferguson, and Jack Feierman, among others. Ritmanis also studied privately with teachers Mauro Bruno, Gibner King, and Matt Dennis.

== Career ==
=== Film and television composition ===
Upon completing her studies, Ritmanis began working at Warner Bros. and Walt Disney Studios, which led to work in the field of orchestration for film and television. She was able to secure a steady supply of work from composers such as Michael Kamen, Basil Poledouris, Shirley Walker, Mark Snow, Paul Chihara, Bennett Salvay, Elliot Goldenthal, Louis Febre, Burt Bacharach, Snuffy Walden, and Carter Burwell. In 1991, with the help of composer Shirley Walker, Ritmanis began her career as a film and television composer. Her collaboration with Walker provided an opportunity for her to write music for Batman: The Animated Series at Warner Bros. Studios. She continued at Warner Bros. with work on Superman: The Animated Series and Batman Beyond. During this period of time, Ritmanis met and began a professional collaboration with composers Michael McCuistion and Kristopher Carter. The trio went on to compose music for The Zeta Project, Teen Titans, Justice League, Justice League Unlimited, Legion of Super Heroes, and several long-form projects.

Ritmanis has orchestrated over 100 films, mini-series, and television programs, including Lethal Weapon 4, The X-Files, Swimfan, Jeepers Creepers 2, Robin Hood: Prince of Thieves, Final Destination, The West Wing, and Demolition Man. She also orchestrated the score, with McCuistion composing and conducting, for the Spider-Man 2 video game, which is based on the 2004 film of the same name. Ritmanis also orchestrated a portion of the closing ceremonies of the Centennial Olympic Games in Atlanta.

=== Concert works ===
Ritmanis's concert works have been and continue to be performed throughout the United States, Canada, Europe, Taiwan, Latvia, and Australia. The symphonic poem Farewell To Riga was performed at Portland Civic Auditorium in 1982. Her cantata A New Day was performed at Alice Tully Hall, Lincoln Center in 1986. In 1989 Tas vakars piektdienā (That Evening On Friday), a musical, was performed at the Terrace Theatre in Long Beach, California and throughout Latvia in the summer of 1990. Turp un atpakaļ (There and back), a musical revue, was performed throughout the United States and Canada in 1999 and 2000. The musical Skudra un sienāzis (The Ant And The Grasshopper) was performed at the Latvian Song Festival in Thousand Oaks, California in 1999. In August 2003, the musical Gudrais padomiņš (Wise advice) was performed at Cathedral Hill in San Francisco. Rudentiņš pie durvīm klauvē (Autumn is Knocking on the Door), a work for choir and chamber orchestra, was performed at Davies Symphony Hall in San Francisco on August 8, 2003. In 2004, Eslingena, a musical, was performed at the Isabel Bader Theatre in Toronto, Ontario, Canada, and in 2005 it was performed at the National Theatre in Riga, Latvia. In 2007, Ritmanis began work on a new musical, which premiered in fall 2008 in Ventura, California.

=== Dynamic Music Partners ===
As of 2007, Ritmanis and her colleagues Michael McCuistion and Kristopher Carter formed the Dynamic Music Partners (DMP). DMP has worked on the Warner Bros. series Legion of Super Heroes. In addition to their work in animation, DMP completed the score for the Thomas Callaway feature film Broke Sky, which premiered at the 2007 SXSW Film Festival.

=== Alliance for Women Film Composers ===
In 2014, Ritmanis co-founded the Alliance for Women Film Composers with Laura Karpman and Miriam Cutler. The organization provides visibility and advocacy for women composers.

== Personal life ==
Ritmanis is married to music producer Mark Mattson. They live in Studio City, California, with their three children – Andris, Ilze and Aija. They maintain two recording studios.

== Awards ==
Ritmanis was nominated for a Daytime Emmy Award in 2007 in Music Direction and Composition category for her work on Legion of Super Heroes. In 2002, she was nominated for an Emmy in the Outstanding Main Title Theme Music category for Justice League. In 2021, Ritmanis received the Hollywood Music in Media Award in the category "Original Score — Independent Film (Foreign Language)" and Society of Composers & Lyricists Award in the category "Outstanding Original Score for Independent Film" for her work in the 2019 Latvian film Blizzard of Souls.
