= List of Teen Titans episodes =

Teen Titans is an American animated television series based on the DC Comics series of the same name by Bob Haney and Bruno Premiani. Developed by Glen Murakami, Sam Register, and David Slack for Cartoon Network and Kids' WB, it was produced by DC Entertainment and Warner Bros. Animation with Sander Schwartz serving as executive producer and Glen Murakami, Bruce Timm, and Linda M. Steiner signing on as producers. The series follows the adventures of a team of crime-fighting teenaged superheroes, consisting of the leader Robin (Scott Menville), alien princess Starfire (Hynden Walch), the technological genius Cyborg (Khary Payton), the dark sorceress Raven (Tara Strong), and the green shapeshifter Beast Boy (Greg Cipes).

Inspired by the success of the DC Comics based series Justice League, the series was created in a semi-serialized format, utilizing anime styles and mixing it with American style animation. The show was greenlit in September 2002 and began airing on Cartoon Network on July 19, 2003, and on Kids' WB on November 1. The series lasted five seasons, each consisting of 13 episodes. The series was concluded with a television movie titled Teen Titans: Trouble in Tokyo that premiered on September 15, 2006. Each season has a story arc revolving around a main character: Robin (season one), Terra (season two), Cyborg (season three), Raven (season four), and Beast Boy (season five). The series's alternative network, Kids' WB, aired two seasons of the series. All five seasons of the series were released on DVD, starting with the first season on February 7, 2006, and ending with the fifth on July 22, 2008. All seasons were also released on Blu-ray disc, with the first season released on January 23, 2018, and a complete series box-set released on December 3, 2019.

Teen Titans has been critically acclaimed for its strong storylines and for its use of anime influences. The first season garnered strong ratings for Cartoon Network; the network had initially ordered 52 episodes of the series. The series was also nominated for three Annie Awards.

== Series overview ==
Each season contains a distinct story arc that is centered on a specific Titan on the team. Starfire is the only individual member who was part of the original roster to not have a season focused on her.

Season	Episodes	Originally released		Season-centric Titan(s)
Season	Episodes	First released	Last released	Season-centric Titan(s)
1	13	July 19, 2003	November 11, 2003	Robin
2	13	January 10, 2004	August 21, 2004	Terra
3	13	August 28, 2004	January 22, 2005	Cyborg
Special		January 3, 2005		—N/a
4	13	January 17, 2005	July 16, 2005	Raven
5	13	September 24, 2005	January 16, 2006	Beast Boy
Movie		September 15, 2006		—N/a
Crossover		September 24, 2019		—N/a

== Episodes ==
=== Season 1 (2003) ===
No. overall	No. in season	Title	Directed by	Written by	Original release date	Prod. code
1	1	"Final Exam"	Michael Chang	Rob Hoegee	July 19, 2003	385-903
2	2	"Sisters"	Alex Soto	Amy Wolfram	July 26, 2003	385-902
3	3	"Divide and Conquer"	Ciro Nieli	David Slack	August 2, 2003	385-901
4	4	"Forces of Nature"	Ciro Nieli	Adam Beechen	August 16, 2003	385-904
5	5	"The Sum of His Parts"	Alex Soto	David Slack	August 23, 2003	385-905
6	6	"Nevermore"	Michael Chang	Greg Klein & Tom Pugsley	August 30, 2003	385-906
7	7	"Switched"	Ciro Nieli	Rick Copp	September 6, 2003	385-907
8	8	"Deep Six"	Alex Soto	Marv Wolfman	September 13, 2003	385-908
9	9	"Masks"	Michael Chang	Greg Klein & Tom Pugsley	September 20, 2003	385-909
10	10	"Mad Mod"	Ciro Nieli	Adam Beechen	September 27, 2003	385-910
11	11	"Apprentice"	Michael Chang	Rob Hoegee	October 4, 2003	385-912
12	12	"Apprentice"	Ciro Nieli	David Slack	October 11, 2003	385-913
13	13	"Car Trouble"	Alex Soto	Amy Wolfram	November 11, 2003	385-911

=== Season 2 (2004) ===
No. overall	No. in season	Title	Directed by	Written by	Original release date	Prod. code
14	1	"How Long Is Forever?"	Alex Soto	David Slack	January 10, 2004	257-321
15	2	"Every Dog Has His Day"	Michael Chang	Rob Hoegee	January 17, 2004	257-322
16	3	"Terra"	Ciro Nieli	Amy Wolfram	January 24, 2004	257-323
17	4	"Only Human"	Alex Soto	Adam Beechen	January 31, 2004	257-324
18	5	"Fear Itself"	Michael Chang	Dwayne McDuffie	February 7, 2004	257-325
19	6	"Date with Destiny"	Ciro Nieli	Rick Copp	February 14, 2004	257-326
20	7	"Transformation"	Alex Soto	Rob Hoegee	February 21, 2004	257-327
21	8	"Titan Rising"	Michael Chang	Amy Wolfram	February 28, 2004	257-328
22	9	"Winner Take All"	Ciro Nieli	Dwayne McDuffie	March 6, 2004	257-329
23	10	"Betrayal"	Alex Soto	Amy Wolfram	July 31, 2004	257-330
24	11	"Fractured"	Michael Chang	David Slack	August 7, 2004	257-331
25	12	"Aftershock"	Ciro Nieli	David Slack	August 14, 2004	257-332
26	13	"Aftershock"	Alex Soto	Amy Wolfram	August 21, 2004	257-333

=== Season 3 (2004–05) ===
No. overall	No. in season	Title	Directed by	Written by	Original release date	Prod. code	Viewers (millions)
27	1	"Wavelength"	Heather Maxwell	Greg Klein & Thomas Pugsley	October 23, 2004	257–488	N/A
28	2	"Deception"	Michael Chang	Rob Hoegee	August 28, 2004	257–481	0.86
29	3	"X"	Heather Maxwell	David Slack	September 4, 2004	257–482	N/A
30	4	"Betrothed"	Alex Soto	Amy Wolfram	September 11, 2004	257–483	N/A
31	5	"Crash"	Michael Chang	Rick Copp	September 18, 2004	257–484	1.68
32	6	"Haunted"	Heather Maxwell	Adam Beechen	October 2, 2004	257–485	N/A
33	7	"Spellbound"	Alex Soto	David Slack	October 9, 2004	257–486	N/A
34	8	"Revolution"	Michael Chang	John Esposito	October 16, 2004	257–487	N/A
35	9	"Can I Keep Him?"	Christopher Berkeley & Michael Chang	Richard Elliott & Simon Racioppa	November 6, 2004	257–490	1.20
36	10	"Bunny Raven... or... How to Make a Titananimal Disappear"	Heather Maxwell	Louis Hirshorn & Joelle Sellner	January 8, 2005	257–491	N/A
37	11	"The Beast Within"	Alex Soto	David Slack	October 30, 2004	257–489	N/A
38	12	"Titans East"	Alex Soto	Marv Wolfman	January 15, 2005	257–492	N/A
39	13	"Titans East"	Michael Chang	David Slack	January 22, 2005	257–493	2.14

=== Season 4 (2005) ===
No. overall	No. in season	Title	Directed by	Written by	Original release date	Prod. code	U.S. viewers (millions)
40	1	"Episode 257-494 (a.k.a. Don't Touch That Dial)"	Heather Maxwell	David Slack	January 17, 2005	257–494	1.36
41	2	"The Quest"	Heather Maxwell	Amy Wolfram	January 29, 2005	257–495	1.73
42	3	"Birthmark"	Michael Chang	David Slack	February 5, 2005	257–496	N/A
43	4	"Cyborg the Barbarian"	Alex Soto	Richard Elliott & Simon Racioppa	February 12, 2005	257–497	0.90
44	5	"Employee of the Month"	Alex Soto	Rob Hoegee	February 19, 2005	257–498	N/A
45	6	"Troq"	Michael Chang	Amy Wolfram	May 9, 2005	257–499	0.94
46	7	"The Prophecy"	Heather Maxwell	Greg Klein & Tom Pugsley	June 4, 2005	257–500	1.05
47	8	"Stranded"	Alex Soto	Melody Fox	June 11, 2005	257–501	N/A
48	9	"Overdrive"	Michael Chang	David Slack	June 18, 2005	257–502	N/A
49	10	"Mother Mae-Eye"	Heather Maxwell	David Slack	June 25, 2005	257–503	1.23
50	11	"The End"	Alex Soto	Amy Wolfram	July 2, 2005	257–504	1.41
51	12	"The End"	Michael Chang	Rob Hoegee	July 9, 2005	257–505	1.02
52	13	"The End"	Heather Maxwell	David Slack	July 16, 2005	257–506	1.36

=== Season 5 (2005–06) ===
No. overall	No. in season	Title	Directed by	Written by	Original release date	Prod. code
53	1	"Homecoming"	Michael Chang	Rob Hoegee	September 24, 2005	257-507
54	2	"Homecoming"	Heather Maxwell	Richard Elliott & Simon Racioppa	October 1, 2005	257-508
55	3	"Trust"	Matt Youngberg	Amy Wolfram	October 8, 2005	257-509
56	4	"For Real"	Michael Chang	Melody Fox	October 15, 2005	257-510
57	5	"Snowblind"	Heather Maxwell	Rob Hoegee	October 29, 2005	257-511
58	6	"Kole"	Matt Youngberg	Amy Wolfram	November 5, 2005	257-512
59	7	"Hide and Seek"	Michael Chang	Amy Wolfram	November 12, 2005	257-513
60	8	"Lightspeed"	Heather Maxwell	Rob Hoegee, George Pérez & Marv Wolfman	December 3, 2005	257-514
61	9	"Revved Up"	Matt Youngberg	John Esposito	December 10, 2005	257-515
62	10	"Go!"	Michael Chang	David Slack	December 17, 2005	257-516
63	11	"Calling All Titans"	Heather Maxwell	Amy Wolfram	January 7, 2006	257-517
64	12	"Titans Together"	Matt Youngberg	Rob Hoegee	January 14, 2006	257-518
65	13	"Things Change"	Michael Chang	Amy Wolfram	January 16, 2006	257-519

== Specials ==
=== Special episode (2005) ===
Title	Directed by	Written by	Original release date
"The Lost Episode"	Matt Youngberg	Rick Copp	January 10, 2005 (online); February 6, 2007 (DVD)
A new villain called Punk Rocket sets off shock waves playing loud music on his guitar, which releases destructive sonic waves, and wants to spread "The Sound of Chaos". Villain(s): Punk Rocket, H.I.V.E Headmistress (cameo at concert), Mad Mod (cameo at concert), Wintergreen (cameo at concert), Mumbo (cameo at concert)

=== Television film (2006) ===
Title	Directed by	Written by	Original release date
Teen Titans: Trouble in Tokyo	Michael Chang, Heather Maxwell, & Matt Youngberg	David Slack	September 15, 2006

=== Crossover film (2019) ===
Title	Directed by	Written by	Original release date
Teen Titans Go! vs. Teen Titans	Jeff Mednikow	Marly Halpern-Graser & Jeremy Adams	September 24, 2019 (Digital); October 15, 2019 (DVD); February 17, 2020
