= List of Teen Titans (TV series) characters =

This is a list of major and minor characters featured in the Cartoon Network and Kids' WB animated series Teen Titans

== Overview ==
Character	Voiced by	First appearance	Seasons					Films			
Character	Voiced by	First appearance	1	2	3	4	5	Trouble in Tokyo	Go! to the Movies	Go! vs.	
Main characters
Robin	Scott Menville	"Final Exam"	Main	Main	Main	Main	Main	Main	Guest	Main	
Starfire	Hynden Walch	"Final Exam"	Main	Main	Main	Main	Main	Main	Guest	Main	
Cyborg	Khary Payton	"Final Exam"	Main	Main	Main	Main	Main	Main	Guest	Main	
Beast Boy	Greg Cipes	"Final Exam"	Main	Main	Main	Main	Main	Main	Guest	Main	
Terra	Ashley Johnson	"Final Exam"	"Terra"		Main		Guest	Guest			Recurring
Slade	Ron Perlman	"Final Exam"	Main	Main	Guest	Main	Guest		Main		
Trigon	Kevin Michael Richardson	"Nevermore"	Guest			Main	Guest			Main	
Brushogun	Cary-Hiroyuki Tagawa	"Trouble in Tokyo"						Main			

== Primary Teen Titans ==
=== Robin ===
Robin (voiced by Scott Menville) is the male protagonist leader of the Teen Titans. Despite lacking superpowers, he is fierce and highly disciplined, with heroic virtues based on experience and reputation and he leads the team well. As shown in the episode "Go", Robin formed the group after aiding Starfire in her escape from captivity with help from Beast Boy, Cyborg, and Raven. Prior to this, he left his mentor Batman to become an independent crime-fighter. The Teen Titans Go! spin-off comic reveals he is Dick Grayson, the first Robin, but this is not depicted in the series, though there are several hints such as Larry's name being Nosyarg Kcid, him becoming Nightwing in the future, and Raven witnessing his parents' death at the circus in "Haunted". Robin is best friends with Starfire, whom he secretly has romantic feelings for. Their relationship develops throughout the series, with them becoming a couple in the finale film Teen Titans: Trouble in Tokyo.

=== Starfire ===
Starfire (voiced by Hynden Walch) is a Tamaranean princess who was kidnapped by the Gordanian overlord Trogaar and intended to be sold into slavery. She escapes to Earth and causes chaos in Jump City, leading to the formation of the Teen Titans. She is also Robin's best friend and love interest, and they secretly harbor romantic feelings for each other; they finally confess their love and become a couple in Trouble in Tokyo.

=== Cyborg ===
Cyborg (voiced by Khary Payton) is an African-American human who was converted into a cyborg to save his life following an unspecified accident. His condition is virtually impossible to disguise, though he initially attempts to do so by covering much of his body with heavy clothing and a hood. He is skilled with technology and is Robin's second-in-command and Beast Boy's best friend.

=== Raven ===
Raven (voiced by Tara Strong) is the gothic half-demon daughter of Trigon and Arella. She possesses vast magical abilities and was intended to act as Trigon's portal to invade Earth. While he succeeds in doing so, Raven works with the Titans to defeat him.

=== Beast Boy ===
Beast Boy (voiced by Greg Cipes) is a former member of the Doom Patrol who can transform into any animal. His early training was highly disciplined and militarized, leading him to initially address more experienced heroes as "Sir". Over time, he becomes less serious and the comic relief of the team.

=== Terra ===
Terra (voiced by Ashley Johnson) is a nomadic girl who can manipulate the earth. She is later revealed to be a double agent working for Slade and sacrifices herself to stop him from destroying Jump City.

In the series finale, "Things Change", a girl resembling Terra resurfaces, but tells Beast Boy that she no longer wants anything to do with the Titans. In an issue of the Teen Titans comic book following the events of the series' final episode, Geo-Force — Terra's superhero half-brother — makes an appearance in which he reveals that Terra, like he, is a member of the royal family of Markovia who fled their home nation after they were both subjected to forced experimentation that gave them both earth-manipulating superpowers. Geo-Force is later convinced to leave Terra alone and leaves without ever reuniting with her.

== Honorary Titans ==
=== Aqualad ===
The ex-sidekick of Aquaman, Aqualad (voiced by Wil Wheaton) makes his debut in the episode "Deep Six", employing the help of the Teen Titans in defeating an Atlantean criminal named Trident. He butts heads with Beast Boy in that episode as he feels shown up by the impressive young Atlantean, but in their battles with Trident, Beast Boy and Aqualad make peace by the episode's end. He returns in "Wavelength", needing the Titans' help to take out Brother Blood's second undersea H.I.V.E. headquarters. Following Blood's escape, they give chase and track him to Steel City, where he and Bumblebee form the Titans East. He later falls prey to Blood's mind control, turning on appointed leader Cyborg and does battle with Titans Central; he is freed after Cyborg defeats Brother Blood in the final battle, and stays on with Titans East.

=== Argent ===
Argent (voiced by Hynden Walch) is a female Honorary Titan who first appears in "Calling All Titans". Deputized by Starfire while walling off a fractured dam, she is soon attacked and captured by General Immortus and flash-frozen at the Brotherhood of Evil's headquarters in Paris. She is later freed and takes part in the final battle of "Titans Together", briefly seen in the background fighting Johnny Rancid, and standing near the foreground at the episode's conclusion when the Titans are summoned to stop Doctor Light.

=== Bumblebee ===
Bumblebee (voiced by T'Keyah Crystal Keymáh) is introduced as a H.I.V.E. student, but is later revealed to have been a spy in the organization working in league with Aqualad. As she reveals in a staged fight with Cyborg, she is immune to Brother Blood's hypnotic influence. She later becomes a founding member of Titans East, convincing Cyborg to become the team's leader, when in fact it turns out to be an elaborate trap staged by Blood when she falls back under his control, though she appeared to be the only one of the group able to occasionally slip free. After Blood is defeated, Cyborg steps down from Titans East, making Bumblebee the new leader.

=== Bushido ===
Bushido is a young silent Japanese swordsman, who is made an Honorary Titan to fend off an incursion by the Brotherhood of Evil, which is preparing to mount an assault on young heroes.

=== Gnarrk ===
Gnarrk (voiced by Dee Bradley Baker) is a caveman friend of Kole seen in the episode "Kole". He is given his name due to the fact that it is the only thing he can say or understand. A primal predecessor of contemporary human beings, he has an enhanced level of agility and strength. When Kole activates her crystallization powers, Gnarrk is able to use her body to great effect as a bludgeoning tool.

=== Herald ===
Herald (voiced by Khary Payton) is a young hooded African American boy who is made an Honorary Titan in the wake of the Brotherhood's efforts to seek and destroy the next generation of superheroes on Earth. He is one of the few Titan-affiliated heroes that manages to evade capture, and partners with fellow survivors Beast Boy, Más, Pantha, and Jericho. The five succeed in infiltrating the Brotherhood's fortress in Paris and ultimately freeing the captured heroes; Herald himself is called upon to save everyone when the Brain, forced into retreat, triggers a massive bomb designed to take out the entire complex.

=== Hot Spot ===
Hot Spot (voiced by Bumper Robinson) is first featured in the Master of Games' Tournament of Heroes in "Winner Take All". He is a pyrokinetic young hero who is made an honorary Titan in the wake of the Master of Games' defeat. In his normal state, he has the appearance of an adolescent African American male, but when employing his heat-based superpowers, he becomes a fiery humanoid.

=== Jericho ===
Jericho is another honorary titan who, alongside Herald, is summoned to the Titans' rendezvous point after the Brotherhood conducts their search-and-capture campaign on the team members across the globe. Jericho is a gentle, mute boy with the ability to possess others via eye contact, taking full control of their bodies, memories, and abilities, the only evidence of which is the black and green eyes the victims assume once possessed.

=== Jinx ===
Jinx (voiced primarily by Lauren Tom and by Tara Strong in the episode "Titans Together") is a sorceress who can manipulate probability and a member of the H.I.V.E. Five. She later falls in love with Kid Flash and leaves the group.

=== Kid Flash ===
Kid Flash (voiced by Michael Rosenbaum) is the self-proclaimed "Fastest Boy Alive" and the former sidekick of Flash (Barry Allen). His secret identity is not revealed in the series, although he is implied to be Wally West, the original Kid Flash.

=== Killowat ===
Killowat is an honorary Titan with a command over electricity. Only featured a few times in the series, Killowat is a young male with luminescent electric-blue skin, glowing white eyes, and tattoo-like magenta streaks of lightning on his arms and torso. In the tie-in comic Teen Titans Go!, he is revealed to have originated from an alternate universe before Raven brought him to the main universe.

=== Kole ===
Kole (voiced by Tara Strong) is a young girl with pink hair who lives with her caveman friend Gnarrk beneath the North Pole to prevent her powers from being used for evil. She can transform into inanimate, indestructible crystal, enabling Gnarrk to wield her as a weapon.

=== Más y Menos ===
Más y Menos (both voiced by Freddy Rodriguez) are superpowered twin brothers from Guatemala and founding members of Titans East. They possess superhuman speed that only works if they are touching. They prefer to only speak Spanish, but understand English.

=== Melvin, Timmy, Teether, and Bobby ===
Melvin, Timmy, and Teether (respectively voiced by Russi Taylor and Tara Strong) are a trio of pre-adolescent children targeted by the Brotherhood of Evil for their fledgling superpowers. They first appear in "Hide and Seek".

Melvin, the only girl in the group and the eldest of the three, can summon a giant living teddy bear named Bobby. Timmy throws temper tantrums which induce earthquakes and sonic booms, and Teether can eat and spit matter.

=== Pantha ===
Pantha (voiced by Diane Delano) is a professional wrestler and honorary member of the Teen Titans. In the episode "Titans Together", Pantha is among the few Titans who escape being captured by the Brotherhood of Evil and works with Beast Boy, Jericho, Herald, and Más to free their captured comrades.

=== Red Star ===
Red Star (voiced by Jason Marsden) is a Russian boy who gained his powers from a secret government project and chose to live in an abandoned nuclear power plant due to lacking control over them. He seemingly dies in his first appearance, but later resurfaces as a member of the Teen Titans.

=== Speedy ===
Speedy (voiced by Mike Erwin) is Green Arrow's former sidekick and a founding member of Titans East. He debuts in "Winner Take All" competing in the Master of Games' Tournament of Heroes. He and Robin make it to the finals, where Speedy narrowly loses. Once Robin discovers the Master of Games' plot to steal the losers' powers and abilities, he does battle with the Master, ultimately freeing Speedy who helps dispatch him with an arrow to his amulet. He is then made an honorary Titan, and later joins the Titans East.

=== Thunder and Lightning ===
Thunder and Lightning (respectively voiced by S. Scott Bullock and Quinton Flynn) are the first honorary Titans to appear in the series; they debut in "Forces of Nature", and are brothers with power over their namesakes. They arrive from the clouds, wreaking havoc on the city in which the Teen Titans live; Beast Boy later deduces that the duo is not evil, but rather misunderstood—they display their destructive powers in acts that they perceive as innocent fun, and battle the Titans on occasion, seeing the challenge as mere roughhousing. The two are later manipulated into creating a fire creature by Slade, who is in the guise of an Asian shaman; however, the two learn the error of their ways thanks to Beast Boy and go on to become heroes allied with the Titans.

=== Tramm ===
Aqualad's engineer, mechanic and friend, Tramm (voiced primarily by Dave Coulier and by Dee Bradley Baker in the episode "Calling All Titans") helps the Titans fix their battle-damaged T-Sub in the episode "Deep Six". He speaks in an indecipherable undersea language and has the appearance of a short, anthropomorphic anchovy. In combat, he can increase his size and strength, much like a pufferfish.

=== Wildebeest ===
Wildebeest (voiced primarily by Dee Bradley Baker and by Jim Cummings in the episode "Winner Take All") is a humanoid wildebeest and honorary member of the Teen Titans. The tie-in comic Teen Titans Go! reveals him to be a human child with the metahuman ability of transformation.

=== Wonder Girl ===
Wonder Girl, the sidekick of Wonder Woman and a founding member of the Teen Titans in the comics, was denied having a prominent role in the series due to licensing issues. As a result, she only makes cameo appearances. Wonder Girl also appears in the tie-in comic Teen Titans Go!, where she is identified as Donna Troy.

== Allies ==
=== Brushogun ===
Brushogun (voiced by Cary-Hiroyuki Tagawa) was formerly a Tokyo artist who fell in love with a woman he drew. He used black magic to bring her to life, and it worked, but he was cursed by the magic, turned into a monstrous being with the ability to create living ink drawings. General Uehara Daizo kidnaps Brushogun and forces him to battle the Teen Titans, during which he is killed.

=== The Doom Patrol ===
The Doom Patrol are a paramilitary unit of superheroes and long-time enemies of the Brotherhood of Evil. Beast Boy was formerly a member until he became estranged from the team years prior.

==== Elasti-Girl ====
Elasti-Girl (voiced by Tara Strong) has the ability to expand her body and grow to a giant size; though it consequently makes her an easier target that is harder to miss, an attack as benign as a foot stomp can level an entire field of enemies merely from the shock wave.

==== Mento ====
Mento (voiced by Xander Berkeley) is the leader and battle coordinator of the Doom Patrol. His uniform signifies as such by way of a yellow lightning-bolt symbol on its chest. Amplified by the helmet atop his head, Mento's super-abilities stem from his formidable mental powers, ranging from telekinesis and mind-reading to quick-acting hypnotic suggestion.

==== Negative Man ====
Negative Man (voiced by Judge Reinhold) has the power of astral projection; able to separate his soul from his body, his "negative self" has targeted intangibility: enemies cannot harm him while in this state, though he can physically interact with solid objects and people. This separation ability can only work for a limited time, however, as extended use of it could lead to its effects being permanent.

==== Robotman ====
Robotman (voiced by Peter Onorati) is a towering metal robotic vessel housing a still-living human brain; as such, he has immense strength and is practically invulnerable to harm. Although capable of free thought, Robotman is headstrong and reckless, often preferring to charge headlong into battle than defer to stealth.

=== Larry ===
Larry (voiced by Dee Bradley Baker) is Robin's Bat-Mite-like counterpart from another dimension. His right index finger has the power to bend reality, and he uses it to watch Robin and his adventures. He enters the Titans' dimension to help fix Robin's broken arm, but fails to do so. He breaks his own finger during a scuffle with Robin as he keeps insisting on helping him; as a result, his reality-warping power is unleashed upon the city, changing it first into an embodiment of a child-drawn picture, and later into a dark, demonic domain when Titans foe Johnny Rancid seizes the power for himself. After Larry's finger is repaired and all is brought back to normal, he returns to his own dimension, but not before Robin offers him the chance to fix his broken arm one last time. He succeeds, but accidentally leaves Robin stranded in a blank, white space in the process.

=== Sarasim ===
Sarasim (voiced by Kimberly Brooks) is a warrior princess from 3000 B.C. She is based on and depicted as an ancestor of Sarah Simms, Cyborg's girlfriend in the comics.

=== Silkie ===
Silkie (voiced by Dee Bradley Baker) is one of the many mutant larvae created by Killer Moth as part of his scheme to take over the city in "Date With Destiny". When he was stopped by the Teen Titans, Beast Boy bonded with one of the larvae, naming him "Silkie", and secretly kept him as a pet at Titans Tower.

== Main villains ==
=== Slade ===
Slade (voiced by Ron Perlman) is the Titans' most recurring foe and Robin's archenemy. Slade relentlessly stalked them since "Divide and Conquer" and enlisted the H.I.V.E. Academy to reveal his existence to the heroes in "Final Exam". Serving as the main antagonist of the first two seasons, Slade attempted to make Robin his apprentice in the first season and later enlisted Terra during the events of the second in an attempt to destroy the Titans that ended with his death. Slade is revived in the fourth season as Trigon's undead emissary to oversee the ritual to summon the demon, siding with the Titans and fully resurrecting himself when Trigon betrayed him before taking his leave.

=== Trigon ===
Trigon (voiced primarily by Kevin Michael Richardson and by Keith Szarabajka in the episode "Nevermore") is Raven's father and archenemy who is feared throughout the galaxies as an ancient demon king. He serves as the main antagonist of the fourth season, enlisting Slade to prepare Raven for a ritual to bring him to Earth and ends up being destroyed by Raven. Trigon returns in the 2019 crossover film Teen Titans Go! vs. Teen Titans, entering an alliance with his Teen Titans Go! counterpart, who revives him using the Raven of his universe.

=== The H.I.V.E. Academy ===
The H.I.V.E. Academy is a secret campus for a rogue's gallery of superpowered teenagers, all being trained to become master criminals. The school is also known as the H.A.E.Y.P. ("H.I.V.E. Academy for Extraordinary Young People").

==== Brother Blood ====
Brother Blood (voiced by John DiMaggio) is a cult leader and the archenemy of Cyborg, who takes control over the H.I.V.E. Academy after the Headmistress disappears; his power is based mainly on his ability to manipulate others through mind control, bending large groups of people to his will. Aside from pure hypnosis, his mind can create vivid hallucinations, and he also boasts both a vast intelligence and a photographic memory. Blood's mental powers also allow him to interfere with radio signals and block the powers of other empaths like Aqualad; they also greatly enhance his own physical abilities: Blood is deceptively strong and quick with supernaturally quick reflexes, allowing him to walk across water, pierce and rip steel with his bare hands, and channel a psychokinetic energy used to teleport or to fire offensively as bolts of lightning and force blasts.

==== H.I.V.E. Headmistress ====
The H.I.V.E. Headmistress (voiced by Andrea Romano) is the unnamed headmistress of the H.I.V.E. Academy in the first season.

==== Gizmo ====
Gizmo (voiced primarily by Lauren Tom and by Tara Strong in the episodes "Revved Up" and "Titans Together") is an impish young boy with a genius-level intellect who is armed with a mechanized backpack that generates multiple devices, gadgets and weapons. Gizmo is also a well-versed computer hacker and inventor, and typically uses these skills against Cyborg in some way, exploiting his robotic weaknesses.

==== Mammoth ====
Mammoth (voiced by Kevin Michael Richardson) is a member of the H.I.V.E. Five who possesses a bestial appearance and superhuman strength. He is brought into the original H.I.V.E. trio as a counterweight to Beast Boy. The genetically modified Mammoth is the least intelligent member of this clique and is mainly used for his brawn and raw power in the execution of H.I.V.E. crimes. In spite of this, he tends to be easily defeated by the Titans in most of the episodes in which he appears.

==== See-More ====
See-More (voiced by Kevin Michael Richardson) is a villain from the H.I.V.E. Academy who joins the H.I.V.E. Five prior to "Mother Mae-Eye". His powers stem from a variety of interchangeable colored eyeballs which are accessible via a dial in his helmet; each eyeball is equipped with a unique function or attack, such as multi-vision, X-Ray vision, hypnosis, projection of eye-shaped bubbles, laser beams, and balloon-based flight.

==== Billy Numerous ====
Billy Numerous (voiced by Jason Marsden) is a villain and student at the H.I.V.E. Academy; like many of the H.I.V.E. characters, Billy Numerous first appears in the cafeteria scene in the episode "Deception". His power is self-duplication, and he is known to brag about his crime sprees to his only friends: his own clones. He wears a skintight red bodysuit with a division symbol on its chest, and speaks with a rural Southern drawl.

==== Kyd Wykkyd ====
Kyd Wykkyd is a silent, bat-costumed male student at the H.I.V.E. Academy with the ability to teleport, first seen in "Deception". After Cyborg and the Titans destroyed H.I.V.E. and the various students went on to become renegade villains, Wykkyd joined the H.I.V.E. Five at some point before the episode "Lightspeed".

==== Private H.I.V.E. ====
Private H.I.V.E. (voiced by Greg Cipes) is a student of the H.I.V.E. Academy who wields a hexagonal shield. In Teen Titans Go! comic, he reforms and joins the Teen Titans.

==== Angel ====
Angel is a villain from the H.I.V.E. Academy who sports bird-like wings that enable flight. In addition, she can also shift them to any size for combat purposes.

==== XL Terrestrial ====
XL Terrestrial is an alien villain from the H.I.V.E. Academy with size-shifting abilities.

==== I.N.S.T.I.G.A.T.O.R. ====
I.N.S.T.I.G.A.T.O.R. is a floating robotic villain from the H.I.V.E. Academy.

==== "Wrestling Star" ====
"Wrestling Star" is a masked wrestler from the H.I.V.E. Academy.

=== The Brotherhood of Evil ===
The Brotherhood of Evil is a secret society of supervillains dedicated to total world domination whom the Doom Patrol fought in the past. They serve as the main antagonists of the final season.

==== The Brain ====
Brain (voiced by Glenn Shadix) is the leader of the Brotherhood of Evil. As suggested by the name, he is a disembodied human brain preserved in a robotic cylinder to keep it alive, only able to communicate via a voice box built in its chassis. Apart from the Brain's genius level intellect, he appears to have a degree of psychokinetic powers channeled by and through his robotic shell.

==== General Immortus ====
General Immortus (voiced by Xander Berkeley) is an ancient military commander who is knowledgeable in every combat strategy ever conceived, mainly by being involved in every major battle in history personally. He even comments on teaching many of history's best minds of war; in the episode "Homecoming", he refers to Sun Tsu—the Chinese military philosopher and author of The Art of War—as one of his students. Immortus has command over armies of both human and robot soldiers, and often uses them as part of a larger plot in executing attacks.

==== Madame Rouge ====
Madame Rouge (voiced by Hynden Walch) is a European shapeshifter and member of the Brotherhood of Evil. Rouge is a malleable shapeshifter with the ability to stretch and contort her body in any way she sees fit; she is most lethal for being able to fully assume the appearances of other people, able to mimic them with little means of detection.

==== Monsieur Mallah ====
Monsieur Mallah (voiced by Glenn Shadix) is a hyper-intelligent African gorilla capable of human speech who develops many of the Doomsday Devices used by the Brotherhood. Mallah is also adept at using weapons, such as grenades and a laser-firing minigun, in conjunction with his bestial strength. Mallah is extremely loyal to his master, the Brain, and is his trusted confidant.

== Other villains ==
=== André LeBlanc ===
André LeBlanc (voiced by Dee Bradley Baker) is a French jewel thief who debuts in "For Real". He later joins the Brotherhood of Evil.

=== Atlas ===
Atlas (voiced by Keith David) is a robotic villain who debuts in "Only Human".

=== Blackfire ===
Blackfire (voiced by Hynden Walch) is Starfire's elder sister and her rival to Tamaran's throne.

=== Cinderblock ===
Debuting in the series premiere episode "Divide and Conquer", Cinderblock (voiced by Dee Bradley Baker) is a living monolithic stone idol with limited intelligence, but near-unstoppable strength. He is named as such due to the several panels on his body which bear a likeness to his namesake. Cinderblock is featured multiple times in the series as a secondary villain.

=== Commander Uehara Daizo ===
Uehara Daizo (voiced by Keone Young) appears as the main antagonist in the feature-length Teen Titans film, Teen Titans: Trouble in Tokyo. He is Tokyo's police commander, and the commander of the Tokyo Troopers, which he secretly uses Brushogun in creating. It turns out that Daizo's goal is to discredit the Teen Titans as heroes, as his own heroic reputation became diminished as the Titans' exploits become internationally known. To this end, Daizo enslaves Brushogun to create criminals for him to capture, to create the Tokyo Troopers to act as his personal army, and creates supervillains to do battle with the Teen Titans.

=== Control Freak ===
Control Freak (voiced by Alexander Polinsky) is an overweight supervillain and film fanatic, notorious for using a nuclear super-powered remote control to warp reality to suit his film inspired images. The remote he self-designed is his only true source of power, but he rarely uses his intellect to accomplish anything meaningful, instead preferring to hype himself into superiority in hopes of garnering mass respect as a supervillain.

=== Ding Dong Daddy ===
Ding Dong Daddy (voiced by David Johansen) is a large 1950s-style street racer who forces Robin to compete in a cross-country race against him and several foes from the Titans' rogues gallery. He is assisted by a group of gremlins who act as a mobile repair crew and disable competitors' vehicles.

=== Dr. Light ===
A recurring secondary villain in the series, Doctor Light (voiced by Rodger Bumpass) is a powerless man who wields a battle suit with offensive-capability light-energy weapons. While the most common offensive use of his suits are the firing of laser beams, he can also generate tangible solid objects from light, such as laser whips, fireballs, trapping orbs, and forcefields.

=== Fang ===
Fang (voiced by Will Friedle) is a spider-like mutant and Kitten's boyfriend. He is human from the neck down, but has a giant four-legged spider in place of a head. The legs of his spider head have the ability to move at fast speeds and jump vast distances, while the head itself is capable of firing sticky webs and paralyzing venom beams.

=== Katarou ===
Katarou (voiced by Keone Young) is a martial artist and member of the Brotherhood of Evil.

=== Killer Moth ===
Killer Moth (voiced by Thomas Haden Church in the episode "Date with Destiny", Marc Worden in the episode "Can I Keep Him?") is a lepidopterist with command over swarms of large mutated moths that are capable of eating through anything. He wears a moth-like suit of body armor equipped with razor-sharp claws and a pair of wings that gives him enhanced speed, strength, and reflexes. He can also adhere to walls and fly.

=== Kitten ===
Kitten (voiced by Tara Strong) is the spoiled and bratty daughter of Killer Moth and the girlfriend of Fang. She first appears in the episode "Date With Destiny", when Fang breaks up with her for unexplained reasons. Not wanting to attend the junior prom alone, she talks her father into threatening the city with a large swarm of mutant moths to force Robin to become her date, which instigated a fight between Fang and Robin, and then between Kitten and a jealous Starfire. It would be revealed that Kitten secretly had control of the moth's release trigger concealed in her corsage, but she, Fang, and Killer Moth are ultimately apprehended and jailed; as she is loaded into the police truck, she angrily screams that Robin would pay for dumping her. In the fifth season, Kitten appears as a member of the Brotherhood of Evil, riding atop a giant mutant moth and wielding a laser whip.

=== Mad Mod ===
Mad Mod (voiced by Malcolm McDowell) is a psychedelic red-headed British villain with the mannerisms of a strict schoolmarm, whose root source of power comes from his ruby-tipped cane. It is later revealed that Mod is actually an old man who uses holograms to appear younger. He is also formidable for his use of hypnotic suggestion which has a stupefying and lobotomizing effect on its victims.

=== Master of Games ===
The Master of Games (voiced by Jim Cummings) is an ape-like alien with the mannerisms of a game show host who takes the three male Titans along with Gizmo, Hot Spot, Wildebeest, Aqualad, and Speedy to his world in "Winner Take All" to hold a "Tournament of Heroes"; in reality, he is attempting to steal all of their unique skills and powers with his magic amulet. His plan ultimately fails when Robin, the winner of his tournament, unites with Cyborg and Speedy to defeat him and destroy his amulet; after the males are returned home at the episode's conclusion, the Master of Games captures Raven, Starfire, Terra, and five others for a "Tournament of Heroines".

=== Mother Mae-Eye ===
Mother Mae-Eye (voiced by Billie Hayes) is a haggish witch with candy-themed magical powers and a mass-produced army of gingerbread cookie soldiers. In her human form, she appears as a plump, rosy-cheeked and kindly woman dressed in a red, white and pink outfit, but she is actually a three-eyed, ugly, wart-nosed witch capable of growing and shrinking in size. Mae-Eye feeds on the affection of her victims; she then traps and bakes them into a gigantic pie. She becomes angered when her victims either come out of the spell on their own, or refuse to eat her pies; in addition to the pies, she is armed with a magical wooden spoon that she uses for most of her fantastical powers.

=== Mumbo ===
Mumbo (voiced by Tom Kenny) is a blue-skinned magician whose powers are largely based on stage magic feats; he once found a working magic wand whose power drove him insane. He is actually an old man, but his powers make him appear younger.

=== Overload ===
Overload (voiced primarily by Dee Bradley Baker and by James Arnold Taylor in the episode "Car Trouble") is a humanoid electric monster with a red-and-black circuit board at its core. It harnesses a series of electrical attacks and the ability to control and manipulate electric-powered machinery, but as the creature is composed largely of electricity, it is extremely vulnerable to water.

=== Plasmus ===
Plasmus (voiced by Dee Bradley Baker) is a normal human being for as long as he is in a state of sleep; whenever awakened, he becomes a mindless, shape-shifting monster made of slime that has an insatiable appetite for toxic waste and raw sewage. Later in the series, Plasmus mutates further after absorbing raw sewage, gaining claws and acid sacs across his body, and joins the Brotherhood of Evil.

=== Professor Chang ===
Professor Chang (voiced by James Hong) is a mad scientist who runs an underground smuggling operation providing illegal services for higher-tier villains. He has several workers helping him, who all wear suits and helmets which hide their faces and never speak.

=== Punk Rocket ===
Punk Rocket (voiced by Greg Ellis) is a musical arsonist who moved from England to the United States to spread what he terms "the sound of chaos". He wears a sleeveless orange prison jumpsuit, and has gray spiked hair and multiple piercings. His weapon is a customized guitar that releases sonic blasts strong enough to knock back a bull elephant by 100 feet, and he is also able to ride it through the air like a surfboard.

=== Puppet King ===
The Puppet King (voiced by Tracey Walter) is an evil marionette who transfers the Titans' souls into puppets in an attempt to enact a ceremony that would turn the Titans' bodies over to him permanently. His plans are disrupted, however, when a spell cast by Raven as he was transferring her and Starfire into their puppets resulted in the two female Titans escaping their puppets, although they were left in each other's bodies as a result. After overcoming their issues in controlling the other's powers, Raven and Starfire work together to stop him, and the Puppet King's spells are broken as the Titans' souls are returned to their proper bodies. The Puppet King is rendered a lifeless marionette as a result, which the Titans stow away in their evidence room. Late in the series, Puppet King appears alive as a member of the Brotherhood of Evil.

=== Red X ===
Red X (voiced by Scott Menville) is originally a cover identity Robin assumes to infiltrate Slade's organization, using a high-tech suit capable of creating various X-shaped effects. In the episode "X", a mysterious thief steals the suit for his own use. While his identity is never revealed, he develops a personal rivalry with Robin, although Red X often ends up helping him against a common enemy. In the original show as well as the New Teen Titans shorts, Beast Boy humorously believes that Red X is the second Robin, Jason Todd.

Red X makes his mainstream DC debut in the two-issue teaser comic Future State: Teen Titans and its follow-up series Teen Titans Academy, where he is presented as a renegade student of Titans' Academy. He is later revealed to be a metahuman with electromagnetic powers named Brick Pettirosso. Brick's surrogate father was a mercenary and thief who stole Dick Grayson's Red X suit as revenge for foiling his plans. It is revealed that Red X II killed Brick's foster parents who worked for Black Mask on making the soldiers in the False Face Society. After being revealed as Red X, Brick believes Grayson to be his father as told by Red X II, only to be killed by his surrogate, before teleporting away leaving him to die in Grayson's arms.

=== Saico-Tek ===
A supporting villain from Teen Titans: Trouble in Tokyo, Saico-Tek is a high-tech Japanese ninja with distinctive blue and pink armor. He wields and generates ninja weapons, including a rocket-propelled jet pack, nunchucks, exploding throwing stars and smoke bombs, many of which take after Saico-Tek's cyan-magenta color scheme.

=== Spike ===
Spike (voiced by John DiMaggio) is a former mechanic and ally of Atlas.

=== Trident ===
Trident (voiced by Clancy Brown) is an Atlantean criminal armed with the mystical weapon of his namesake.

== Other characters ==
=== Arella ===
Arella (voiced by Virginia Madsen) is Raven's biological mother. Raven, desperate to avoid her obligation to release her father upon Earth, travels to her ancestral home of Azarath hoping to find a way to avert the impending apocalypse. She finds, however, that Azarath is largely abandoned, save for a flock of doves which she finds Arella caring for. Arella somberly informs Raven that the prophecy she is to fulfill cannot be stopped, and that Earth will fall to Trigon just as Azarath once did; at that moment, the illusion of Azarath falls away and the realm is found to be in ruins, which is the work of Trigon. It is never revealed if Arella was a product of the illusion, existing as a spirit of the lost civilization, or if she is actually Azarath's lone survivor of Trigon's wrath.

=== Wintergreen ===
Wintergreen is Slade's butler and right-hand man.
