= Teen Titans Go! To the Movies =

2018 animated film

- Theatrical release poster
- Directed by: Peter Rida Michail; Aaron Horvath
- Written by: Michael Jelenic; Aaron Horvath
- Based on: Characters from DC
- Produced by: Aaron Horvath; Michael Jelenic; Peggy Regan; Peter Rida Michail; Will Arnett
- Starring: Greg Cipes; Scott Menville; Khary Payton; Tara Strong; Hynden Walch; Will Arnett; Kristen Bell
- Edited by: Nick Kenway
- Music by: Jared Faber
- Production companies: Warner Bros. Animation; DC Entertainment
- Distributed by: Warner Bros. Pictures
- Release dates: July 22, 2018 (TCL Chinese Theatre); July 27, 2018 (United States)
- Running time: 84 minutes
- Country: United States
- Language: English
- Budget: $10 million
- Box office: $52.1 million

Teen Titans Go! To the Movies is a 2018 American animated musical superhero comedy film featuring the DC Comics superhero team, the Teen Titans. Based on the Cartoon Network animated television series Teen Titans Go!, it was produced by Warner Bros. Animation and DC Entertainment, and distributed by Warner Bros. Pictures. The film was directed by Peter Rida Michail and Aaron Horvath, who also co-wrote the screenplay with Michael Jelenic. It features the voices of Greg Cipes, Scott Menville, Khary Payton, Tara Strong, and Hynden Walch, reprising their respective roles from the series, while Will Arnett and Kristen Bell join the cast, with the former serving as a producer.

Taking place during the events of the fifth season of the television series, the film follows the Teen Titans, who attempt to have a movie made about them in Hollywood while dealing with supervillain Slade. Warner Bros. Pictures first announced the film in September 2017 with the series' voice cast set to reprise their roles. Arnett and Bell were added to the cast in leading roles a month later.

Teen Titans Go! To the Movies premiered in the TCL Chinese Theatre on July 22, 2018, and was theatrically released in the United States on July 27, 2018. It grossed $52.1 million worldwide on a $10 million budget. It received positive reviews from critics, who praised the story, humor, music, and entertainment value. This is one of the posthumous releases for longtime DC producer Benjamin Melniker, who died five months before its release.

== Plot ==
In Jump City, the Teen Titans arrive to stop the Balloon Man but jump into a rap song to introduce themselves and become distracted, forcing the Justice League to intervene. They criticize the Titans for their childish behavior and inability to take their positions as superheroes seriously, raising the fact that they do not have a feature-length film to prove their legitimacy.

At the premiere of Batman Again, the Titans' leader Robin is mocked and laughed at by the superhero audience after a misunderstanding leads him to assume that there is a film about him. When a supervillain named Slade breaks into S.T.A.R. Labs to steal a crystal, the Titans try to stop him, but he defeats and insults them.

Beast Boy, Starfire, Cyborg, and Raven create a film about Robin to cheer him up but he gets upset, turns it off before watching the ending, and declares that they will go to Hollywood for a film. Upon arriving at Warner Bros. Studios, they encounter director Jade Wilson, who is responsible for all the superhero films. Jade rejects them because they lack an archnemesis. But she also says that she would make one of them if there were not any other superheroes, so the Titans go back in time using the Time Cycles. However, this means that all of the supervillains take over the world and superhero movies are not being made anymore anyway, so they go back in time again to set things right. In order to have one, the Titans retrieve the crystal from Slade at Wayne Tech, however, Slade escapes, resolving Robin to split from his teammates.

The next day, Jade announces that she will make a movie about the Titans due to their successful fight with Slade. Raven, Beast Boy, Starfire, and Cyborg discover a device labeled "DOOMSDAY" and try to destroy it. Jade explains that D.O.O.M.S.D.A.Y. is actually Digitally Ordering Online Movies Streaming Directly At You, which is an acronym for an over the top service for superhero movies. Upset with the Titans' shenanigans, she drops them from the film and decides to make it solely about Robin. He accepts and decides that the Titans should break up, believing that they are holding each other back. As he films his movie, he begins to regret his decision and miss his friends.

On the final day of filming, Jade, who is revealed to be Slade in disguise, steals the crystal back from the Titans Tower. He then reveals that the superhero films he made were to keep all the heroes distracted with filming while he stole technology from their cities to build D.O.O.M.S.D.A.Y., with which he will control minds and conquer the world. He also purposely caused a rift between Robin and his friends to defeat them. Slade destroys the Titans Tower, but Robin escapes. He calls his friends and apologizes; they return and reconcile with him.

At the premiere of Robin: The Movie, the Titans unmask Slade's disguise, but he unleashes the crystal's power to mind-control the Justice League and send them after the Titans. However, Slade uses the power device to hypnotise Robin and tells him to attack his friends. They show their homemade movie to remind him that he is the hero of the Titans, causing Robin to turn back to normal. The team uses their rap song to defeat Slade and destroy the crystal, snapping the other heroes and the rest of the world out of their trance. The Justice League finally acknowledge the Titans as real heroes and Robin says he has realized he can be a hero and be himself without a movie.

== Cast ==
- Scott Menville as Robin, Batman's sidekick and the de facto leader of the Teen Titans who uses gymnastic skills, martial arts and various weapons to fight crime.
  - Jacob Jeffries as Robin's singing voice for the song "My Superhero Movie".
- Hynden Walch as Starfire, a beautiful Tamaranean princess who has the ability to fire bright green-colored bolts of ultraviolet energy and green laser beams as well as possessing immense physical strength and supersonic flight. She is also shown to have a villainous older sister known as Blackfire.
- Tara Strong as Raven, a human sorceress who is secretly half-demon and has the ability to fly, use telekinesis, teleportation and magic as well as open portals to other dimensions. She is also the daughter of an inter-dimensional satanic-like demon named Trigon and a human named Arella and was originally born on Azarath, her former birthplace and home realm.
- Khary Payton as Cyborg, a cybernetic enhanced human cyborg who was once a former athlete and football player. He has the power of using a variety of weapons from his mechanical body as well as possessing enhanced strength. He is also the oldest of the Teen Titans, Beast Boy's best friend and even a member of the Justice League.
- Greg Cipes as Beast Boy, a green-skinned humanoid, a member of the Teen Titans and Cyborg's best friend who is the youngest and comic relief of the group and has the power to shapeshift into various animals of all shapes and sizes.
- Will Arnett as Slade, a supervillain and Robin's nemesis.
  - Kristen Bell as Jade Wilson, a famous filmmaker, who is actually Slade in disguise, and let the Teen Titans try to persuade to make a movie about them.
- Eric Bauza as:
  - Aquaman, a member of the Justice League and King of Atlantis.
  - Stan Lee's assistant
- Michael Bolton as Tiger
- Nicolas Cage as Superman, a member of the Justice League and survivor of Krypton. Cage, who is a big fan of Superman, was intended to play Superman in the cancelled film Superman Lives directed by Tim Burton. He later portrayed an alternate version of the character in the 2023 film The Flash, in a cameo appearance.
- Joey Cappabianca as Plastic Man, a member of the Justice League.
- Greg Davies as Balloon Man, a balloon-themed supervillain.
- John DiMaggio as:
  - Guard
  - Synth Skate Voice
- Halsey as Wonder Woman, a member of the Justice League and Princess of Themyscira.
- David Kaye as:
  - The Alfred trailer announcer
  - Announcer Inside Premiere
- Tom Kenny as Machine Voice
- Jimmy Kimmel as Batman, a member of the Justice League and Robin's mentor.
  - Kal-El Cage (Nicolas Cage's son) voices a younger Bruce Wayne.
- Stan Lee as himself. This was Lee's first and only appearance in a DC Comics film, before his death in November 2018.
- Vanessa Marshall as Vault Voice
- Phil Morris as:
  - John, the red carpet announcer
  - D.O.O.M.S.D.A.Y., a streaming device
- Patton Oswalt as Atom, a member of the Justice League.
- Alexander Polinsky as Control Freak, a media-manipulating enemy of the Teen Titans.
- Meredith Salenger as Supergirl, the cousin of Superman.
- Dave Stone as Kyle "Ace" Morgan, leader of the Challengers of the Unknown.
- Fred Tatasciore as:
  - Jor-El, the late father of Superman
  - Security Guard
- James Arnold Taylor as Shia LaBeouf, who is cast for the role of Slade in Jade's Teen Titans film.
- Lil Yachty as Green Lantern, a member of the Justice League and Green Lantern Corps.
- Wil Wheaton as The Flash, a member of the Justice League.

== Production ==
In September 2017, Warner Bros. Pictures announced a film adaptation of the Cartoon Network series Teen Titans Go! scheduled for a July 2018 release, with the show's cast reprising their roles. A month later, the film's title and teaser poster debuted, and it was announced that Will Arnett, who voices Batman in The Lego Movie franchise, and Kristen Bell had joined the cast.

In March 2018, it was announced that musicians Lil Yachty and Halsey were part of the cast, as Green Lantern and Wonder Woman, respectively, with Nicolas Cage revealed as Superman the same day. Cage was originally slated to portray Superman in Tim Burton's canceled Superman film, Superman Lives, in the 1990s. Jimmy Kimmel was announced to voice Batman in the film through an extended cut of the trailer.

== Soundtrack ==
Teen Titans Go! To the Movies (Original Motion Picture Soundtrack)

Soundtrack album by Various artists
- Released: July 20, 2018
- Genre: Soundtrack album
- Length: 35:30
- Label: WaterTower Music
- Producer: Various artists

The Teen Titans Go! To the Movies soundtrack was released on July 20, 2018. The soundtrack consists of songs that the cast sing throughout the movie that serve mostly as musical pop culture references and parodies, and the musical score composed by Jared Faber.

1. "GO!" – Hynden Walch, Tara Strong, Scott Menville, Khary Payton, Greg Cipes
2. "My Superhero Movie" – Jacob Jeffries
3. "Upbeat Inspirational Song About Life" – Michael Bolton, Hynden Walch, Tara Strong, Scott Menville, Khary Payton, Greg Cipes
4. "Crystals" – David Gemmill and M A E S T R O
5. "Shenanigans" – Peter Rida Michail and Khary Payton
6. "GO! (Battle Remix)" – Hynden Walch, Khary Payton, Scott Menville, Tara Strong, Greg Cipes
7. "GO! (Remix)" – Lil Yachty
8. "Upbeat Inspirational Song About Life [Reprise]" – Michael Bolton
9. "Welcome to Jump City" – Jared Faber
10. "Balloon Man Invades" – Jared Faber
11. "Check This Out" – Jared Faber
12. "This Is Where They Make Movies" – Jared Faber
13. "Slade Arch Nemesis Suite" – Jared Faber
14. "Chasing Slade" – Jared Faber
15. "Slade's Master Plan" – Jared Faber
16. "Robin Misses The Titans" – Jared Faber
17. "The Tower Collapses" – Jared Faber
18. "Titans Save The World Suite" – Jared Faber
19. "Slade Becomes Giant Robot" – Jared Faber
20. "Justice League Returns/Saved By Titans" – Jared Faber
21. "Star Labs/Doomsday Device" – Jared Faber
22. "Worthy Arch Nemesis" – Jared Faber
23. "Back To The Future Theme" – Alan Silvestri (arranged by Fred Kron)

== Release ==
The film was released in theaters in the United States on July 27, 2018, by Warner Bros. Pictures and became generally available on November 23, 2018, followed by a United Kingdom bow a week later. It was released in Australian theaters on September 13, 2018. An early screening was held on June 22 at Vidcon 2018, for both badge members and YouTubers. The film was also shown at San Diego Comic-Con on July 20, 2018. The film had its worldwide premiere as the opening film of the TCL Chinese Theatre special screening event. DC Comics announced that Teen Titans Go! To the Movies held a watch event on November 22, 2018 and released Teen Titans Go! To the Movies for general availability on the next day. The film's theatrical release was preceded by #TheLateBatsby, a short film based on Lauren Faust's forthcoming DC Super Hero Girls television series. Teen Titans Go! To the Movies was generally available for download from MSDN and Technet on November 7 and for retail purchase from November 23, 2018. The film was set to make its network television premiere on TBS on September 12, 2020, but was removed from the schedule and replaced by an airing of Sherlock Gnomes for unknown reasons. The film made its official network television premiere on Cartoon Network on November 25, 2020.

== Home media ==
Teen Titans Go! To the Movies was released on digital copy on October 9, 2018, and on DVD and Blu-ray on October 30, 2018.

== Reception ==
=== Box office ===
Teen Titans Go! To the Movies has grossed $29.6 million in North America, and $22.3 million in other territories, for a total worldwide gross of $52 million, against a production budget of $10 million.

In the United States, Teen Titans Go! To the Movies was released alongside Mission: Impossible – Fallout, and was initially projected to gross around $14 million from 3,188 theaters in its opening weekend, with a chance to go as high as $19 million. However, after making $4.6 million on its first day (including $1 million from Thursday night previews), estimates were lowered to $10 million, and it ended up debuting to $10.5 million, finishing 5th at the box office.

=== Critical response ===
On Rotten Tomatoes, the film has a rating of 92% based on 132 reviews, with an average rating of 7.2/10. The site's critical consensus reads, "Teen Titans Go! To the Movies distills the enduring appeal of its colorful characters into a charmingly light-hearted adventure whose wacky humor fuels its infectious fun – and belies a surprising level of intelligence." On Metacritic, the film has a score of 69 out of 100 based on reviews from 25 critics. Audiences polled by CinemaScore gave the film an average grade of "B+" on an A+ to F scale.

Laura Prudom of IGN gave the film a score of eight out of ten, calling it a "gleefully unhinged deconstruction of superhero tropes that isn't afraid to take aim at the rest of DC's cinematic roster". Owen Gleiberman of Variety said "Teen Titans GO! is fun in a defiantly super way, and that's a recommendation." Frank Scheck of The Hollywood Reporter wrote that "Considering the somberness that afflicts so many DC universe releases, the tongue-in-cheek, albeit admittedly juvenile humor of Teen Titans Go! To the Movies should come as a welcome relief to fans."

David Betancourt of The Washington Post opined, "Teen Titans Go! To the Movies is a laugh-a-minute ride that hits you with the jokes from the very first frame. From the cute shots at Marvel Studios to the self-deprecating tone on the state of DC movies, you’ll leave the theater with a new set of superhero abs from laughing so hard."

Brandon Katz of The New York Observer said that the film is "a fun parody of sorts that gently skewers our superhero obsessed culture, and while there may be one too many gags thrown in there which can get a bit tiresome after awhile, it's an enjoyable movie for both kids and adults". Brian Tallerico of RogerEbert.com rated the film at three out of four, saying "It's not a film designed to break ground or even offer too much social commentary on the role of superheroes in modern culture. It's built with the primary goal of making you laugh and forget your problems for just under 90 minutes, and it does exactly that."

GameSpot's Chris Hayner, while finding fault with what he deemed excessive toilet humor and some dragging in the film, said that "In a superhero movie landscape where the world is constantly being destroyed by massive CGI abominations, this is a refreshing change... it doesn't forget how funny and exciting these types of movies can be".

=== Accolades, awards and nominations ===
| Year | Award | Category | Nominee | Result | Ref. |
|---|---|---|---|---|---|
| 2019 | 46th Annie Awards | Outstanding Achievement for Writing in an Animated Feature Production | Michael Jelenic and Aaron Horvath | Nominated | |
| 2019 | 2019 Kids' Choice Awards | Favorite Female Voice from an Animated Movie | Kristen Bell | Nominated | |

== Franchise ==
=== Three direct-to-video sequel films ===
Teen Titans Go! To the Movies was followed by three direct-to-video sequel films Teen Titans Go! vs. Teen Titans (2019), Teen Titans Go! See Space Jam (2021) and Teen Titans Go! & DC Super Hero Girls: Mayhem in the Multiverse (2022).

=== Television follow-up ===
A Teen Titans Go! episode, titled "Tower Renovation", premiered on August 13, 2018, after the first Teen Titans Go! film's release. The episode is about the Teen Titans who attempt to rebuild the Titans Tower after Slade destroyed it in the events of the first Teen Titans Go! film.
