= Raven (DC Comics) =

- Raven as she appears on the cover of the Tales of the Titans #3 (2023). Art by Nicola Scott.

Publication information
- Publisher: DC Comics
- First appearance: DC Comics Presents #26 (October 1980)
- Created by: Marv Wolfman; George Pérez

In-story information
- Alter ego: Raven / Rachel Roth (Post-Flashpoint)
- Species: Azarathian Cambion (demon/human hybrid)
- Place of origin: Azarath
- Team affiliations: Teen Titans; Titans; Sentinels of Magic; Night Force; Justice League; Justice League Dark
- Partnerships: Beast Boy
- Notable aliases: Mistress of Magic; Daughter of Darkness; Daughter of Trigon; Doctor Hate; Dark-Winged Queen; The Unkindness; Dark Raven
- Abilities: Demonic hybrid physiology grants her various powers, including empathic and magic abilities that allows for telepathy, manipulation of emotions, dimensional travel, and more.; Skilled teacher, hand-to-hand combatant, and profound knowledge of the supernatural.

Raven, also known as Rachel Roth, is a superheroine appearing in American comic books published by DC Comics. The character first appeared in a special insert in DC Comics Presents #26 (October 1980), and was created by writer Marv Wolfman and artist George Pérez. Her design was based on the Phantom Stranger. Raven was one of the key figures instrumental to the revival of Teen Titans and among the most popular characters within the franchise.

Born as the daughter of the demon lord Trigon and human Arella, she is granted a lineage of great supernatural power as an empath and demonic sorceress. Despite her heritage and the ominous predictions associated with her connection to Trigon, Raven becomes a prominent and reoccurring superhero in various rosters for the Teen Titans and Titans. Raven has also served in other superhero teams, including the Justice League, Sentinels of Magic, Night Force, and Justice League Dark. Following the character's popularity in her media appearances, Raven has also starred in several comic mini-series titles.

Raven has appeared in numerous television series and films, including Cartoon Network's Teen Titans series and its spin-off series Teen Titans Go!, voiced by Tara Strong, and in the DC Animated Movie Universe (DCAMU), voiced by Taissa Farmiga. The character made her live-action debut in the DC Universe/HBO Max series Titans, portrayed by Teagan Croft.

== Development ==
In an interview, Perez described his design approach for the character,

…taking the cue that Raven was very mysterious à la Phantom Stranger, I took that as a starting point, and using the shadow face where half her face is always in shadow despite the lighting, was a shtick I got from Phantom Stranger, who also had the same deal. He had a long billowing cape, as did she, and in her case, since her name was Raven, I decided to create a silhouette for her that would look like a bird. The hood was designed so that in the profile, it would end up looking like a bird's head, so that when her soul self came out, since that was done in full black, it looked like a gigantic black raven. Her name and the Phantom Stranger were key to how I designed her.

When asked if Raven's face was based on any real-life person, Perez said that, "[o]riginally, Raven was Persis Khambatta, the actress who played in the first Star Trek film, and later became a young lady named Fran Macgregor, who was a dancer, and I used some of her features, particularly for her figure, for Raven."

== Fictional character biography ==
=== First life of Raven ===
Raven first appeared in The New Teen Titans #1 recruiting superheroes to fight her father, Trigon. She initially approached the Justice League for help, but they refused her on the advice of Zatanna, who sensed her demonic parentage. In desperation, she reformed the Teen Titans as the New Teen Titans to fight her father. The team consisted of Robin, Kid Flash, Wonder Girl, Starfire, Cyborg, and Beast Boy (then known as Changeling). Raven and her new friends later came to think of one another as family.

Trigon soon took Raven back to his own realm. The Titans pursued them, defeated Trigon and sealed him in an interdimensional prison with the help of Arella, who swore to watch over his prison so that he could not escape. Raven found that using her powers enabled Trigon to assert control over her mind and body. For a period of time, Raven lost control several times in stressful situations but managed to regain control of herself.

Eventually, Trigon escaped his prison, exacted revenge on Arella by destroying Azarath, came to Earth, and took control of Raven. The Titans were manipulated into having the dark sides of their souls kill the evil Raven by Lilith Clay, who was guided and possessed by Azar, thereby allowing the souls of Azarath and Raven herself contained inside her rings to possess her now-empty body and use her as a channel to kill Trigon. After this battle, Raven rose from the ashes, cleansed of Trigon's evil, and vanished.

=== Raven ===
After Raven's disappearance, Arella went around the world in search of Raven. She tracked Raven down, but both of them were kidnapped by Brother Blood. The minions of Blood used Raven to control Nightwing (formerly Robin) as part of Blood's plans. The Titans rescued them both and prevented Blood from returning to power.

With her demonic nature suppressed, Raven was free to experience emotions for the first time in her life and soon realized that she could not only sense but control others' emotions. She learned to handle this power only after unintentionally making Nightwing believe that he loved her when she thought she was in love with him. Raven also fostered a relationship with technopath Eric Forrester, who used the life force of women he seduced to regain some of his lost humanity. Forrester knew that Raven's soul-self could help him to retain his humanity permanently. This attempt was cut short by the intervention of Joseph Wilson (Jericho), who helped Raven destroy Forrester once and for all and sparked a brief romance between the two heroes after.

Evil Raven makes her appearance in the "Terror of Trigon" storyline, which began The New Teen Titans (vol. 2). Art by George Pérez.

Raven was later kidnapped by the Wildebeest Society during the "Titans Hunt" storyline. The Society is led by Jericho, who has been possessed by the souls of Azarath, and intends to use several Titans to bring about the return of Trigon. During a massive battle, Raven was possessed by the evil souls and once again became the evil doppelgänger of her father. Arella and Raven's friend Danny Chase combined their powers and used the purity of Azar's soul to cleanse Raven. In the aftermath, Raven's body was destroyed, and Arella and Danny willingly merged their own bodies with the cleansed souls of Azarath to form an entity known as Phantasm.

=== Evil Raven ===
Raven appeared possessed by her evil conscience and attempted to implant Trigon's seed into new bodies. She interrupted Nightwing and Starfire's wedding and implanted a seed of Trigon into Starfire. Instead of corrupting her, she implanted the soul of the good Raven. This caused Starfire to leave Earth to escape from the evil Raven. The Titans could defeat Raven only because of the help they received from Phantasm.

Raven later returned, still evil, to destroy the good version of herself implanted in Starfire. With the help of the Titans, evil Raven was reduced to ashes, and the good part of Raven was given a new, golden spirit body completely free of her father's demonic influence. In New Tamaran, Starfire and the golden spirit form of Raven revealed that implanting Raven's soul in Starfire was actually a plan concocted by Raven; with the inherent evil in her soul permanently removed, Raven regained her full humanity while preserving her powers.

=== Spirit ===
In her bodiless spirit form, Raven returned to Earth to help extract her former teammate Cyborg's soul and consciousness from the Technis planet's computer mind. Later, she was instrumental in defeating Imperiex by aiding Wonder Woman and Tempest in re-powering Darkseid. Once Imperiex was defeated, Raven then resumed her journey to find a new purpose.

=== Rebirth ===
Raven's spirit was ultimately trapped by a ritual of the Church of Blood. Under the revived Brother Blood's supervision, she was forcibly placed in the comatose body of a young, teenage girl. The Teen Titans (reformed again), discovered that the Church of Blood were worshipers of Raven's father, Trigon. They also found a prophecy about the marriage between Blood and Raven that would result in Armageddon. The new team interrupted the wedding, and Blood and his followers were forced to flee. Rejoining the Titans, Raven (who was now the same age as her teammates) created the human identity of "Rachel Roth" by taking her late mother's surname. As Rachel, she enrolled in a local high school.

After enduring much confusion about her new place in the world, Raven's teammate Garfield Logan (Beast Boy), began developing romantic feelings for her, and the two became romantically attached.

=== 52 ===
In 52, after the death of Superboy, the Titans began to fall apart. Robin joins Batman, and Wonder Girl left the team. Beast Boy struggled to maintain the team and was flippant towards Raven and their relationship. The new members who joined were only interested in seeking fame rather than looking to fulfill justice. When Beast Boy decided to help Steel on a mission, most of the members left, leaving only Raven and Zatara. Later, Beast Boy, Raven, Offspring and Aquagirl aid Steel in launching an attack on LexCorp. Raven also participated in World War III. Eventually, Robin, Wonder Girl, and a few new members join the Titans, making the team whole again. Beast Boy and Raven were among the only members that remained in the team during this period.

==== "One Year Later" ====
Raven's new look in "One Year Later".

Raven quit the team after she and Beast Boy ended their relationship. Letting the others think she was leaving because of Garfield, Raven left because she uncovered a secret of one of the other Titans.

Raven took advantage of this power with a book of unclear significance. Raven had a diskette containing Jericho's soul. She performed a cleansing ritual over his soul and transferred it into a new body before returning to the team as a full member.

Without warning, the Titans are captured by the villainous Titans East and transported to the original Titan Island in New York City, where Raven is placed in the "care" of Enigma and Duela Dent, who took to torturing her psychologically. Raven manages her escape. After beating the Titans East, she and Garfield talk about their feelings, but he refuses to dwell on the matter, leaving their relationship uncertain.

Following the death of Bart Allen, Raven, along with the other adult Titans, decides to leave the team. Putting heroics aside, Raven concentrates instead on finishing her high school education and continuing to live a normal human life as Rachel.

Raven later appeared in a five-issue miniseries written by Marv Wolfman, with art by Damion Scott. It occurs during the "missing year", following Raven's attempts at living as an ordinary teenage girl and attending high school. Unfortunately, she gets inadvertently drawn into a mystical fight involving Psycho-Pirate's Medusa Mask and has to battle for the lives of her classmates. In the Wizard #177 magazine, Wolfman briefly described the series, saying, "She needs to be on her own and in charge of herself for the first time in her life. This is more than just a 'tale of Raven'; it sets up her new life".

=== Titans ===
Raven discovers that Trigon had more than one child, her half-siblings, and that a trio of male children devoted to her father are behind the attacks. She is affected along with many of the other Titans by these three beings. Raven's three half-brothers use her and Beast Boy as keys to open a portal to Trigon's realm. Raven uses her own power to influence greed in others to make her half-brothers steal what little power Trigon had left. The portal is closed and Trigon's sons, believing they have gained great power, leave.

Raven's half-brothers later return and provoke her demonic side, causing her to leave the Titans and join them. However, the team was able to track them down and convince Raven to join the side of good once more. She later provided a number of other artifacts, all capable of killing her, to the Titans as terms for her staying with the team.

=== Wyld ===
Battered and dazed, Raven arrived at Titans Tower, where she was rescued by the newest roster of Teen Titans. While she was recovering, Beast Boy stated that he was still in love with her and would remain so, despite whatever difficulties were involved.

Raven decided to stay with the Teen Titans, now acting as a mentor to the younger members. When the Teen Titans attempted to return home, Raven was kidnapped and taken to another dimension by Wyld. Wyld reveals that Raven was the one who created him. When Raven was traveling dimensions looking for her father, her soul self caused all of the animals she visited to merge into one being: the Wyld. The Titans enter the Wyld World to rescue Raven. Wyld is eventually destroyed by Static.

In the final issue of this incarnation of the Titans, Superboy-Prime and his Legion of Doom attack Titan's Tower. Raven stops Kid Flash just before he can kill Inertia. Then she reveals her soul-self to Headcase, terrifying and in so defeating him. After the Legion of Doom is defeated and Superboy-Prime is bound to the Source Wall, Beast Boy and Raven have a talk about her difficulty in reading Solstice's emotions after Beast Boy had accused Raven of leaving her behind and he refused to believe her when she stated it was not on purpose. They also talked of their encounter with Headcase. Eventually, Raven starts to open up about her true feelings. Beast Boy makes it clear he does not want to escape from any part of her. Touched, Raven decides that she needs to embrace the positive feelings inside her rather than just her negative ones. Beast Boy assures her this is part of being human, and points out, "I think you've worried enough about the bad...so why don't we focus on the good for a change?" With that, the two reconcile and share a heartfelt kiss.

=== The New 52 ===
Raven in the New 52. Art by Kenneth Rocafort.

After the events of the 2011 "Flashpoint" series, the history of the DC Universe was altered, resulting in The New 52. Raven makes her New 52 debut in the first issue of the Phantom Stranger. There she is shown as a girl in a black and white striped sweater becoming distraught at a funeral over the overwhelming emotion emanating from the people there. The Phantom Stranger takes Raven to Stonehenge, the portal between Earth and the realm of Trigon. Being told by a "higher power" what must be done, the reluctant Stranger unwillingly hands her over to Trigon.

==== Teen Titans ====
Raven made her first Teen Titans appearance in Teen Titans vol. 4 #16. Raven, sporting a new costume, is introduced by Trigon as his "Black Bird of Terror" to his minions. It is strongly suggested that Raven had been controlling Robin's emotions. During Trigon's invasion on Earth, she approached a near-dead Beast Boy who had been assaulted by Deathstroke in the remains of the Ravagers facility. After being touched by Raven, Beast Boy awoke. When he asked if Harvest had sent her, she apologized stating that she brought him into the fray much sooner than she expected, stating, "Hush. We are birds of a feather now... You are mine to control", as Raven mind-controlled him and teleported them to New York where Trigon and the Teen Titans are in battle.

==== Raven's origins revisited ====
Trigon reveals more of Raven's origins. He has had a son from each of the other worlds he's conquered, but Raven is his only daughter. Trigon let Raven's mother, Arella, live as he believed that she needed to be raised as a human to preserve her natural empathetic abilities, key to Trigon's plan to have his daughter succeed him as ruler of the seven under-realms. Refusing to accept this fate, Arella fled with her daughter to Azarath where the monks taught her how to control her dark side and avoid Trigon's influence on her. Years later, she escaped from Azarath to protect her mentors and planet from Trigon and fled to the Earth where Phantom Stranger captured her for Trigon.

Raven then returned to the under-realms and quickly surpassed her father's expectations, recognizing that the only way to spare those she loved from his wrath was to accept the destiny he'd chosen for her. Impressed, Trigon abdicated his throne and gave it to Raven, who willingly took her birthright as Queen.

==== Return of Trigon ====
In New York, Trigon's three sons, Belial, Ruskoff, and Suge, assault the Teen Titans to take Raven back. Raven, Beast Boy, and the Titans defeat them, but Trigon appears again and takes control of the Titans save for Red Robin, Raven and Beast Boy. The manipulated Titans attack, and while Raven and Beast Boy distract them and Trigon, Tim [Red Robin] cuts through Trigon's eyes with his inertrite wings. Pulling out the wings from his eyes, Trigon compliments Tim before suddenly disappearing. Soon after, a woman and a group of suited men come through a portal, informing them that they will take Psimon into custody and make the incident appear as if it had never happened. When questioned about the police officers Psimon has killed, the woman reveals it was a hallucination by Trigon, so it has never happened.

Raven and Beast Boy are re-accepted into the Teen Titans. Raven brings controversy to the team by revealing Tim's flirtatious relationships when under Trigon's control. Raven goes into her room, leaving the awkward situation behind. There, she summons her father, saying, "Father, I am one of them. Your plan worked perfectly", leaving questions on what side she is playing for.

Meanwhile, Tim calls Raven aside, telling that if something happens to him, the team will look up to her to lead them.

==== Forever Evil ====
After the events of "Trinity War", the Earth's greatest heroes are gone and the Crime Syndicate of America has taken over the world. The Teen Titans challenge the Crime Syndicate, but are easily overpowered by Johnny Quick and Atomica and then flung into the time stream. While the Titans are constantly flung through time, Raven is sent a few thousand years back in time. There, she is challenged by Etrigan the Demon, who recognizes her as Trigon's daughter and tries to kill her. Raven is saved by Wonder Girl, who suggests that the way to stop Raven's powers, since she was born and raised in a world between worlds, is to manipulate the energy within the time stream. Raven succeeds in anchoring the Titans with her soul-self, teleporting them through time.

The Titans arrive 20 years into the future, where Jon Lane Kent has massacred most of Earth's superheroes, leaving only a few, including Beast Boy (Garfield Logan), now calling himself Beast Man, and Rose Wilson. Superboy (Kon-El) and Jon battle, and Kon triumphs. Kon is sent elsewhere by an unknown power, and a severely injured Jon is swapped unknowingly as Superboy by Logan and Wilson. The Titans depart again to an alien planet in the 30th century, where Kid Flash is a rebel leader and war criminal, Bar Torr. While the Titans stay to witness Bar Torr's trial, Raven deduces Superboy is Jon, and helps send him back to the present time so that he can find a cure for his deteriorating body condition.

Leaving Kid Flash and Solstice in the future, the Titans return to their original time and are united with Bunker, Beast Boy, and Skitter. Raven finds out that their journey has severed Trigon's control over her. Followed by an attack by the villain Grimm, the Titans plan a final attack on Harvest's new colony. Raven is reluctant to join because of her past actions, but Bunker tells her that everybody deserves a second chance, and Raven changes her mind. In the colony, they are surprised to find that everyone is returned to normal, and even the victims of the Culling have been restored to life. Raven plays a crucial role by finding out Harvest's scheme to extract all the metagenes to create a massive DNA strand for his usage. This is destroyed by Raven's soul-self and Harvest is finally defeated.

=== DC Rebirth ===
Sometime after leaving the Teen Titans, Raven traveled to San Francisco hoping to find her mother's family and introduce herself to them. She attempted to conceal her powers before having a misadventure and was then later abducted by Damian Wayne, who recruited her to be part of the new Teen Titans team he was establishing to take down his grandfather Ra's al Ghul. It is then revealed that the Demon's Fist, a team initially led by Damian before he decided to follow Batman, were hunting each of the assembled Titans that Damian had abducted for their initiation into the League of Assassins. Raven is targeted by Plague, an assassin whose hands can rot, decay and take the life out of anything she touches.

=== New Justice ===
Following the events of Dark Nights: Metal and Justice League: No Justice, Raven joins a new incarnation of the Titans led by Nightwing. The team consists of Nightwing, Donna Troy, Beast Boy, Miss Martian, Steel, and Raven. The Titans investigate a metahuman crisis caused by the destruction of the Source Wall, which has resulted in ordinary people developing dangerous superpowers. Raven uses her empathic and mystical abilities to help the team understand and contain the new threats. During the team's missions, Raven helps battle metahumans and other threats created by the Source Wall's destruction. The Titans eventually become involved in a conflict with the Blood Cult and Mother Blood, whose activities are connected to the Titans' history and Raven's demonic heritage. In Justice League: No Justice, Raven joins Wonder Woman's team alongside Doctor Fate, Zatanna, and Etrigan. The heroes temporarily form new alliances with members of other superhero teams to confront the Omega Titans and prevent the destruction of the universe.

=== Infinite Frontier ===
Following the restoration of the multiverse during Dark Nights: Death Metal, Raven continues to operate as a member of the Titans. She becomes a faculty member of the Roy Harper Titans Academy, alongside Nightwing, Starfire, Donna Troy, Beast Boy, and Cyborg. The academy is established to train a new generation of young superheroes.

Raven develops a close relationship with Beast Boy during her time at the academy. She also becomes involved in the life of Dane, a student who possesses demonic abilities. Raven believes that Dane's destiny may be connected to an ancient prophecy and takes responsibility for helping him understand and control his powers. When Dane and Billy Batson travel to the Underrealm in search of the Rock of Eternity, Raven follows them and helps rescue Dane from Neron.

The Titans Academy is later attacked by Deathstroke and his forces during the events of Dark Crisis on Infinite Earths. Raven and the other Titans fight to defend the academy, but the assault results in the destruction of their school. After the events of Dark Crisis, the Titans assume a more prominent role in the DC Universe as the Justice League is disbanded. Raven remains a member of the reunited Titans alongside Nightwing, Starfire, Cyborg, Donna Troy, Beast Boy, and Arsenal.

=== Dawn of DC ===
Following Dark Crisis and "Lazarus Planet", the Titans become the premier superhero team of the DC Universe. Raven returns alongside Nightwing, Starfire, Cyborg, Donna Troy, Beast Boy, and Arsenal. Raven's history is revisited in Tales of the Titans #2, which explores her origins and her relationship with her demonic father, Trigon. The story is part of a series of character-focused issues examining the histories of the Titans.

Raven subsequently plays a major role in "Titans: Beast World". When the alien Necrostar threatens Earth, Beast Boy transforms into a giant creature resembling Starro, spreading spores that transform millions of people into animal-like beings. Raven and the other Titans attempt to save Beast Boy and reverse the catastrophe. During the conflict, Raven's dark counterpart becomes increasingly important. Doctor Hate is ultimately revealed to be the dark version of Raven that had previously been trapped within the gem on Raven's forehead. The entity escapes and takes control of the Nightmare Stone and the Helmet of Hate, becoming a major threat to Raven and the Titans.

== Characterization ==
Raven possesses considerable power as a result of her lineage and connection to her father Trigon, a powerful demonic entity. Her unique heritage, being half-demon and half-human with a human mother, leads to an ongoing theme of balancing her formidable powers and mastering the mystic arts. Despite the constant threat from her father and other demonic forces, Raven aspires to become a hero and works to overcome the challenges presented by her lineage.

In the Infinite Frontier era, Raven is depicted as being in her twenties, in contrast to her portrayal as a teenager in DC Rebirth. During this time, she assumes the role of a faculty member at the Teen Titans Academy while also being a member of the Titans. As a faculty member, she takes on the responsibilities of a school counselor and serves as an expert in mystic subjects. Several other notable DC Comics characters whom are mystically inclined served under her tutelage, including fellow demon hybrid Nevermore, Shazam, and Stitch.

== Powers and abilities ==
Due to her heritage and training under Azar, Raven is a powerful mystic and empath; Raven is capable of sensing emotions and with pain and disease, she can ease them by assimilating them into her body and expunging them although the process is painful to undergo. Other powers including reading emotions and possessing telepathic-like insights into the minds of others. These abilities facilitate her "Soul Self", her astral body shaped like her namesake that allows her to travel long distances, become intangible, establish telepathic communication, and function as a protective shield capable of absorbing an energy and solid matter. Initially, Raven's soul-self had a time limit of five minutes outside her body, after which she would experience mental torment. She eventually overcame this constraint.

Raven is considered adept in magic, allowing for various sorcerous powers such as teleportation, manipulation of shadows, telekinesis, hypnosis and proficiency in chaos magic, able to perform magical effects without adherence to a system of magic (incantations, chants, etc.). Raven also has limited precognition allowing her to predict near-future events, occurring involuntarily and infrequently. Over time, Raven's mastery of these abilities has advanced to the extent that she is considered a skilled teacher in the mystic arts.

In her demonic form, in which also her own soul-self is activated, her abilities are enhanced; granting heightened physical strength and endurance, her aptitude for chaos magic is strengthened, and her powers become more destructive as well as adopting a red-skinned appearance with a set of glowing eyes on her forehead. Like her brothers, Raven can induce and amplify one of the seven deadly sins (in her case, pride) or all seven of them, in any living being. Doing so causes her to suffer bouts of nausea and vomiting for several days afterward. In addition to her demonic abilities, she is skilled in hand-to-hand combat.

=== Weaknesses ===
Due to being an empath, Raven cannot completely disconnect herself from others emotions, with exposure to many others with heighten feelings posing a risk and susceptibility to magical forces.

== Collected editions ==
Raven

	Title	Material collected	Publication Date	ISBN
All	Raven	Collects issues #1–6	2017	978-1401268985

Raven: Daughter of Darkness

	Title	Material collected	Publication Date	ISBN
1	Raven: Daughter of Darkness Vol 1	Collects issues #1–6	2018	978-1-4012-8473-2
2	Raven: Daughter of Darkness Vol 2	Collects issues #7-12	2019	978-1-4012-8963-8

== Other versions ==
- Evil Raven, also known as Dark Raven, is the evil version of Raven who has given into the influence of Trigon. While often simply an extension of her own self and power, a version of it separated into its own being for a time. This version, first appearing in Knight Terrors: Night's End #1 (August, 2023), is the demonic half that gained independence and seeks power to fulfill her intended destiny as Trigon's daughter. Initially, she acquired Helmet of Hate, the diametrical dark counterpart of the Helmet of Fate, and the Nightmare Stone. Later, managing to trap the other sons of Trigon and the Spectre to enhance her power, she ascends to her prophesized form as the Dark-Winged Queen. However, Beast Boy reveals that Dark Raven had never harm her friends meaningfully without prior control of the Lords of Chaos and opined she had a choice in rejecting Trigon's intended purpose.
  - As Doctor Hate She was a major villain in the Titans: Beast World crossover, responsible for erasing Beast Boy's consciousness when he transformed into a Starro to defeat its ancestral enemy, the Necrostar. Hate battles both heroes and villains of African origin known as "The Network" as well as the Titans, where her identity is eventually discovered by. With the help of other Titans, Dark Raven is stripped of the Helmet of Hate, wherein it is destroyed, but secretly prevailed in her battle with Raven, instead trapping her and covertly adopting her counterpart's identity for a time.

=== Alternate reality versions ===
- An alternate universe version of Raven appears in Teen Titans: Earth One.
- Moonchild, an alternate universe version of Raven, appears in The Books of Magic Annual #3.
- Dark Raven, an alternate timeline version of Raven, appears in Titans Tomorrow.
- Raveniya Dayspring, a fusion of Raven and Marvel Comics character Aliya Dayspring, appears in the Amalgam Comics universe.
- Ravanna, a fusion of Raven and Zatanna, appears in Superman/Batman.
- The Unkindness is a potential future version of Raven, introduced in Future State: Teen Titans #1 (2021). Corrupted by the Four Horsemen of Apocalypse unleashed by Red X, this version forms an alliance with Neron and manages steals Shazam's powers, greatly bolstering and enhancing her own formidable powers. As the Unkindness, she becomes a significant threat to the universe. In the 853rd century, she leads a cabal of the last Lords of Chaos and Seven Deadly Sins (Shazam's foes) and battles the Quintessence, with the Wizard Shazam's future self sending future Black Adam to the past with the last of his power before being killed, displacing his present self due to his simultaneous existence as a cosmic being .
- An illusionary alternate version of Raven appears in DC/Wildstorm: DreamWar.
- An alternate timeline version of Raven from a future where the New Teen Titans never existed appears in Booster Gold vol. 2.
- An alternate universe version of Raven appears in Flashpoint. This version is a member of the Secret Seven before being killed by the Enchantress.
- An alternate universe version of Raven appears in DC Comics Bombshells. This version is of German descent and was forced to aid the Nazis after they destroyed her village before escaping.
- On Earth-11, a gender-swapped male version of Raven appears as a teenaged hero allied with Teen Justice (an alternate, gender swapped version of the Teen Titans) and is in a relationship with Donald Troy, the gender-swapped version of Donna Troy.

== In other media ==
=== Television ===
Left to right: Raven as depicted in Teen Titans (2003–2006), Raven as depicted in Teen Titans Go! (2013–present), Teagan Croft as Rachel Roth as depicted in Titans (2018–2023)
- A teenage Raven appears in Teen Titans (2003), voiced by Tara Strong. This version is a member of the eponymous team who wears a hooded blue cloak and black leotard and possesses grey skin, violet-blue eyes, and shoulder-length violet-blue hair. Additionally, she possesses dark mystical energy, which she often invokes via the chant "Azarath Metrion Zinthos" and allows her to perform several feats, such as telekinesis, teleportation, and safely phasing through solid objects and fire, among other abilities, which are all tied to her emotions. She initially starts the series as the most reserved and stoic member of the Titans, though she eventually softens up and comes to see them as family.
- Raven appears in the "New Teen Titans" segment of DC Nation Shorts, voiced again by Tara Strong.
- Raven, based on the Teen Titans (2003) incarnation, appears in Teen Titans Go! (2013), voiced again by Tara Strong. This version is a member of the Teen Titans who sports black hair with purple streaks, is more chatty and sociable, and displays her dark side when she is provoked or agitated. Additionally, she eventually goes on to enter a relationship with fellow Titan Beast Boy and possesses an alternate superhero identity called "Lady Legasus". Moreover, the Teen Titans (2003) incarnation of the character also appears in the episode "The Academy" via archival footage.
- The Teen Titans Go! (2013) incarnation of Raven appears in the OK K.O.! Let's Be Heroes episode "Crossover Nexus", voiced again by Tara Strong.
- A teenage adaptation of the character renamed Rachel Roth / White Raven appears in Titans, portrayed by Teagan Croft. This version is the half-sister of Brother Blood. Following her mother's murder, Rachel's powers manifest, leading to her receiving protection from Dick Grayson and helping found a new incarnation of the Titans.
- Raven appears in DC Super Hero Girls (2019), voiced again by Tara Strong.
- The Titans incarnation of Rachel Roth makes a cameo appearance in "Crisis on Infinite Earths" via archive footage from the episode "Titans".

=== Film ===
- The Teen Titans (2003) incarnation of Raven appears in Teen Titans: Trouble in Tokyo, voiced again by Tara Strong.
- Raven appears in films set in the DC Animated Movie Universe (DCAMU), voiced by Taissa Farmiga.
  - Introduced in Justice League vs. Teen Titans, this version is a member of the Teen Titans who forms a bond with new teammate Damian Wayne. After defeating her father Trigon, she traps him in a crystal shard and wears it on her forehead to stop him from escaping.
  - Raven appears in Teen Titans: The Judas Contract.
  - Raven appears in Justice League Dark: Apokolips War. Following Darkseid's invasion of Earth and most of Earth's heroes being killed, she enters self-imposed exile to protect Damian from Trigon. Two years later, the pair reunite to help Earth's remaining heroes mount an assault on Apokolips and confess their feelings for each other. After Damian is killed in battle, Raven loses control of her powers and inadvertently frees Trigon, who battles and eventually helps defeat Darkseid. After she resurrects Damian, the two share a kiss before the Flash resets the timeline.
- The Teen Titans Go! (2013) incarnation of Raven appears in Teen Titans Go! To the Movies, voiced again by Tara Strong.
- Raven appears in DC Super Hero Girls: Legends of Atlantis, voiced again by Tara Strong.
- The Teen Titans Go! (2013) and Teen Titans (2003) incarnations of Raven appear in Teen Titans Go! vs. Teen Titans, both voiced again by Tara Strong. Additionally, several alternate universe variants of Raven make minor appearances throughout the film, such as her Tiny Titans, the New Teen Titans comic, and DCAMU counterparts.
- Raven makes a non-speaking appearance in Injustice.
- The Teen Titans Go! (2013) incarnation of Raven appears in Teen Titans Go! & DC Super Hero Girls: Mayhem in the Multiverse, voiced again by Tara Strong.
- The Teen Titans Go! (2013) incarnation of Raven appears in Teen Titans Go! See Space Jam, voiced again by Tara Strong.

=== Video games ===
- Raven appears as a playable character in Teen Titans (2005), voiced by Tara Strong.
- Raven appears as a playable character in Teen Titans (2006), voiced again by Tara Strong.
- Raven appears in DC Universe Online, voiced by Adriene Mishler. She is initially forced to serve Trigon as a brainwashed thrall until being freed by the Teen Titans.
- Raven appears as a playable character in Injustice: Gods Among Us, voiced again by Tara Strong. This version is an associate of the Justice League. Additionally, an alternate universe version of Raven appears as a former member of the Titans and servant of Trigon who joined High Councilor Superman's Regime to hasten the former's return.
- Raven appears as a character summon in Scribblenauts Unmasked: A DC Comics Adventure.
- Raven appears as a downloadable playable character in Lego Batman 3: Beyond Gotham.
- The Teen Titans Go! (2013) incarnation of Raven appears as a playable character in Lego Dimensions, voiced again by Tara Strong.
- Raven appears in Teeny Titans, voiced again by Tara Strong.
- The Injustice incarnation of Raven makes a cameo appearance in a flashback depicted in Starfire's ending in Injustice 2 as a former member of the Teen Titans who left to serve Trigon.
- Raven appears as a playable character and boss in Lego DC Super-Villains, voiced again by Tara Strong.
- Raven, based on her Rebirth design, appears as a cosmetic costume in Fortnite, with a classic design and civilian appearance based on her as Rachel Roth also being available.
- Raven appears as a playable character in MultiVersus, voiced again by Tara Strong.
- Raven appears as a playable character in DC: Dark Legion, voiced by Cia Court.

=== Miscellaneous ===
- Rachel Roth / Raven appears in Smallville Season 11: Harbinger. She is kidnapped by Brother Blood, who intends to use her as a sacrifice to summon the Sons of Trigon, before she is rescued by Zatanna and John Constantine. After the latter takes the Book of Magick and leaves Zatanna behind, Blood successfully completes the ritual by using himself as the sacrifice. The Sons of Trigon pursue Zatanna and Roth until Constantine has a change of heart and uses Blood's heart to defeat the trio. Following this, Zatanna places Roth in Jay Garrick's care, after which she joins the Teen Titans.
- Raven makes a non-speaking cameo appearance in the "DC Super Friends" short.
- The Injustice incarnation of Raven appears in the Injustice: Gods Among Us prequel comic. Amidst Trigon's fight with Mister Mxyzptlk, Raven attempts to convince the former to stop before he destroys reality until Doctor Fate intervenes and banishes both Trigon and Mxyzptlk to another dimension. Shaken by her father's "death", Raven seals herself in a pocket dimension. Believing that Fate's decision is proof that she will never be fully accepted by human society, Raven abandons her humanity and embraces the dark portion of her soul, which enhances her power. This leads her to join Superman's Regime with the intent of freeing her father and helping him conquer Earth.
- Raven appears in DC Super Hero Girls (2015), voiced again by Tara Strong.
- Raven appears in DC x Sonic the Hedgehog: Metal Legion. She is shown along with her fellow Titans as well as Tails and Blaze the Cat battling Brother Blood and H.I.V.E..

== Cultural impact and legacy ==
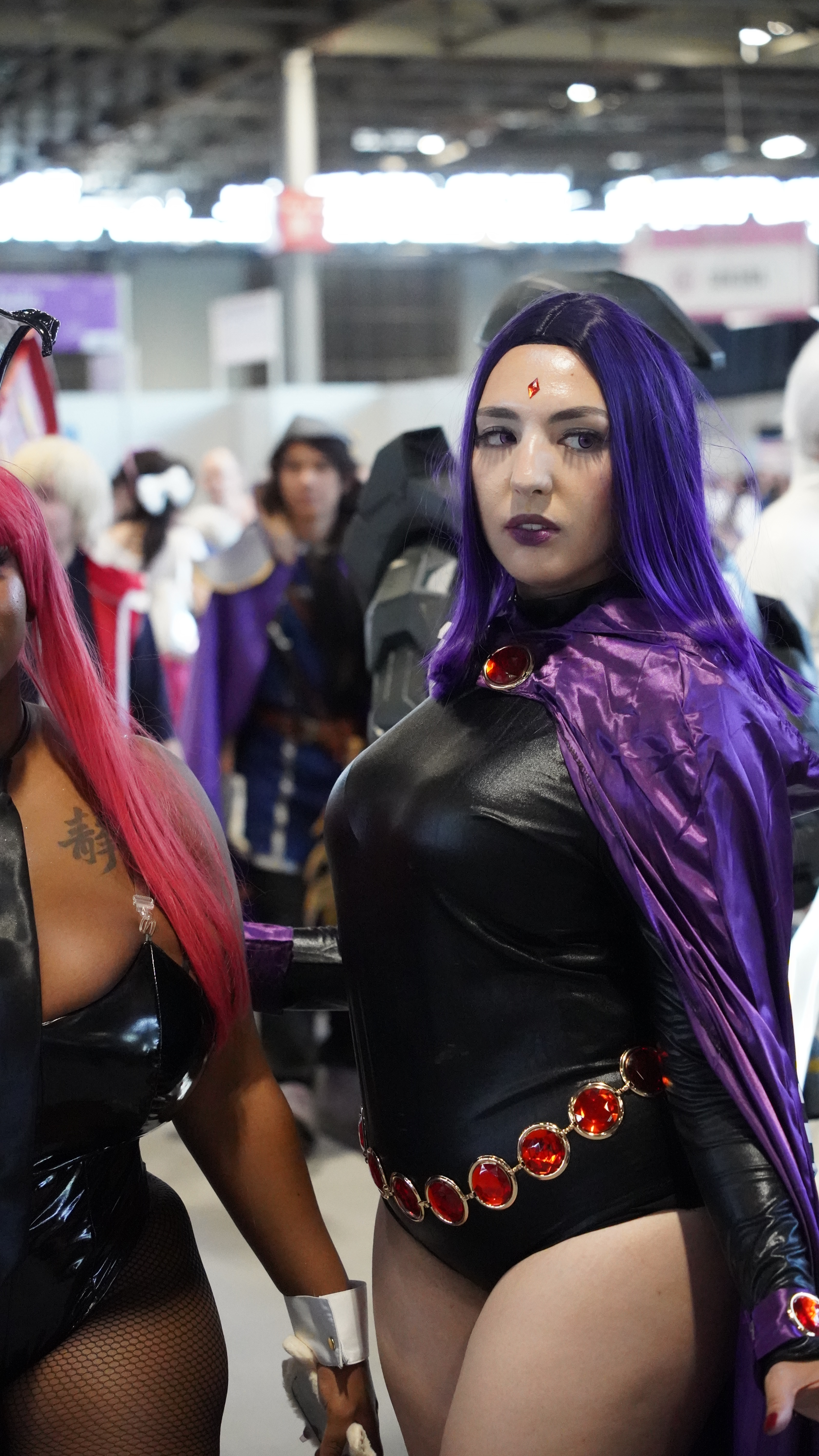
Raven Cosplay

Raul Arias Philippi of Screen Rant stated, "In-universe acknowledgment of her powers and character growth in the Teen Titans is far more important than the portrayal doing Raven's character justice, though, and Titans United #1 delivers on this front as well. First, Nightwing defers to Raven's expertise when first encountering the recently empowered criminal. As Raven tries to assess and control the situation, she cycles through several of her powers to both engage the threat, and help her teammates, particularly a fatally injured Beast Boy who she heals without breaking a sweat. While previously her Teen Titans teammates might have been concerned about Raven overdoing it with the magic, it's clear here that she has the team's complete trust, regardless of whatever magic she uses and how complex or dangerous it is. Perhaps though, the biggest endorsement of Raven comes from Beast Boy, who lauds her heroism when returning to base, saying: "You always wanna help. That's why you're the best of us."

== See also ==
- List of DC Comics characters
