= Teen Titans: Trouble in Tokyo =

2006 American made-for-TV animated film

- DVD cover art featuring the main characters' names which were in Katakana
- Genre: Superhero; Action; Science fantasy Comedy drama Romance
- Based on: Teen Titans by Bob Haney, Bruno Premiani & DC Comics Teen Titans by Glen Murakami, DC Comics & Warner Bros. Animation
- Written by: David Slack
- Directed by: Michael Chang, Ben Jones & Matt Youngberg
- Starring: Scott Menville; Hynden Walch; Khary Payton; Tara Strong; Greg Cipes; Cary-Hiroyuki Tagawa; Keone Young
- Music by: Kristopher Carter; Michael McCuistion; Lolita Ritmanis
- Country of origin: United States
- Original languages: English; Japanese

Production
- Executive producer: Sander Schwartz
- Producers: Glen Murakami & Linda Steiner
- Cinematography: Pepi Lenzi & Tak Fujimoto
- Editor: Joe Gall
- Running time: 75 minutes
- Production companies: Kadokawa Shoten; DC Comics; Warner Bros. Animation

Original release
- Network: Cartoon Network
- Release: September 15, 2006

Related
- Teen Titans; Teen Titans Go!

Teen Titans: Trouble in Tokyo is a 2006 American made-for-TV animated superhero film adaptation of the DC Comics superhero team Teen Titans. The film is a continuation and the series finale of the animated series Teen Titans that ran on Cartoon Network from 2003 to 2006. It premiered on Cartoon Network on September 15, 2006. Teen Titans head writer David Slack wrote the film. A standalone follow-up sequel titled Teen Titans Go! vs. Teen Titans, was released in 2019.

== Plot ==
Saico-Tek, a limb-regenerating ninja, wreaks havoc in Jump City before being stopped by the Teen Titans. Robin interrogates Saico-Tek, who fears Brushogun, his master in Japan. Saico-Tek then triggers a fire sprinkler, which dissolves him. Determined to stop Brushogun, the Titans head to Tokyo, where they are stalked by a shadowy figure.

Robin's investigation leads the Titans to Shinjuku. Meanwhile, Deka-Mido, a reptilian monster, attacks Tokyo. The city's defense force, the Tokyo Troopers, stops Deka-Mido. Their commander, Ushara Daizo, brings the Titans to their headquarters. Robin asks Ushara about Brushogun, who says that they are an urban legend. Ushara tells the Titans that they are welcome to enjoy Tokyo, but must refrain from superheroics. The Titans tour Tokyo; Cyborg enjoys himself at a sushi buffet, Beast Boy falls in love, Raven searches for books, and Robin and Starfire go to Tokyo Tower.

Robin and Starfire express their feelings for each other, but Robin becomes distracted by a clue to Brushogun's location, saddening Starfire, who flies away. The shadowy figure deploys a new version of Saico-Tek to eliminate Robin. Robin seemingly kills Saico-Tek and is arrested by Ushara. Elsewhere, a little girl helps Starfire realize that her feelings for Robin are mutual.

The Mayor of Tokyo announces Robin's arrest and orders that the remaining Titans must turn themselves in or leave Tokyo. The Titans regroup and save Robin from the Troopers. Raven informs the Titans that Brushogun was an artist who was inadvertently turned evil after using sorcery to bring his drawings to life, absolving Robin.

The Titans track Brushogun to an abandoned comic book publishing factory. They discover that Brushogun, near death, is trapped in a cursed printing press that harnesses his powers. Brushogun reveals that he sent Saico-Tek to Jump City as a lure to get the Titans to help him. They learn that Ushara has been using Brushogun's powers to create the Tokyo Troopers and invent various monsters to save Tokyo from. Ushara appears and uses Brushogun's powers to attack the Titans.

Robin corners Ushara, who jumps into the printing press and takes full control of Brushogun's powers. During the battle, Robin frees Brushogun, who dies peacefully in his arms, dissipating his creations and depowering Daizo. With the battle concluded, Robin and Starfire finally confess their feelings and share their first true kiss. With Robin's name cleared and Daizo imprisoned, the Titans are awarded medals of honor for their heroic actions. Robin then allows the group to stay in Tokyo and enjoy a well-earned vacation.

During the end credits, the Titans sing a translated version of their Japanese theme song to celebrate their victory.

== Voice cast ==
- Scott Menville as Richard "Dick" Grayson / Robin, Japanese Boy
- Hynden Walch as Princess Koriand'r / Starfire, Mecha-Boi
- Tara Strong as Rachel Roth / Raven, Computer Voice
- Greg Cipes as Garfield Logan / Beast Boy
- Khary Payton as Victor Stone / Cyborg
- Cary-Hiroyuki Tagawa as Brushogun
- Keone Young as Commander Uehara Daizo, Saico-Tek, Sushi Shop Owner
- Robert Ito as Bookstore Owner, Japanese Old Man, Mayor
- Janice Kawaye as Nya-Nya / Miko Tezumi, Karaoke Club Girls, Timoko
- Yuri Lowenthal as Japanese Biker, Japanese Man, Japanese Mugger, Japanese Bartender, Karaoke Club Owner, Jump City Truck Driver, Scarface

== Reception ==
Teen Titans: Trouble in Tokyo received generally positive reviews from critics.

Filip Vukcevic of IGN said in his review: "Something's missing here. Teen Titans the television show is a fun, vibrant series that's a lot more entertaining than it looks. Following the show's recent cancellation, it seems like Trouble in Tokyo is the last we'll get of our intrepid heroes. Unfortunately, as a swan song or otherwise, when squeezed Teen Titans: Trouble in Tokyo reveals itself for what it really is: a suspiciously average direct-to-DVD movie that looks good, but doesn't do anything to conceal the fact that underneath it's fake".

Rafe Telsch of Cinema Blend wrote: "Teen Titans: Trouble in Tokyo is a decent follow up for the cancelled series that should make fans happy to see their favorite characters again, although a few of the characters seem to get the shaft on screen time".

== Soundtrack release ==
A soundtrack to the film was released on July 22, 2008, through La-La-Land Records. The track listing is as follows.

All tracks are written by Kristopher Carter, Michael McCuistion and Lolita Ritmanis.

Teen Titans: Trouble in Tokyo
No.	Title	Length
1.	"Meet Saico Tek"	5:18
2.	"Interrogation"	1:23
3.	"Main Title"	2:36
4.	"Tokyo Arrival"	1:28
5.	"Monster Attack"	4:36
6.	"Troopers Tour + Robin's Disappointment"	1:46
7.	"Titans Watched"	1:52
8.	"Starfire Videogame"	1:18
9.	"Moment Lost"	2:39
10.	"Tokyo Skyline + Robin Blots Out Saico Tek"	4:11
11.	"All You Can Eat / Boy Troubles"	2:01
12.	"Titans Attack"	1:51
13.	"The Note"	0:51
14.	"The Fight Continues"	2:43
15.	"Raven Finds Books / Robin Goes Underground"	1:19
16.	"Play It Louder"	0:55
17.	"Bar Fight"	1:18
18.	"Motorcycle Chase"	1:57
19.	"Brushogun Origin"	2:17
20.	"Chasing Titans"	1:58
21.	"Meet Brushogun"	3:48
22.	"Villains Makin' Copies"	2:16
23.	"Final Battle"	4:20
24.	"The Kiss"	0:55
25.	"Tokyo's Newest Heroes"	1:58
26.	"End Credits"	1:59
Total length:		53:33

== Home media ==
The DVD release date was February 6, 2007. The special features included are "The Lost Episode", featuring the villain Punk Rocket, and a game entitled Robin's Underworld Race Challenge. Trouble in Tokyo was also released on Blu-ray through the Warner Archive Collection on December 3, 2019.

== Sequel ==
A stand-alone sequel serving as a crossover between Teen Titans and its successor series entitled Teen Titans Go! vs. Teen Titans premiered at San Diego Comic-Con 2019 in July, followed by digital release on September 24 and physical release on October 15.
