= Teen Titans Go! vs. Teen Titans =

2019 American animated superhero action comedy film

- DVD Cover
- Directed by: Jeff Mednikow
- Written by: Marly Halpern-Graser; Jeremy Adams
- Based on: Characters from DC
- Produced by: Jeff Mednikow
- Starring: Greg Cipes; Scott Menville; Khary Payton; Tara Strong; Hynden Walch; Kevin Michael Richardson
- Edited by: Cris Mertens; Nick Simotas
- Music by: Jason Lazarus
- Production companies: Warner Bros. Animation; DC Entertainment
- Distributed by: Warner Bros. Home Entertainment
- Release dates: July 21, 2019 (San Diego Comic-Con); September 24, 2019; (United States)
- Running time: 77 minutes
- Country: United States
- Language: English

Teen Titans Go! vs. Teen Titans is a 2019 American animated direct-to-video superhero comedy film that serves as a crossover between the television series Teen Titans Go! and the original Teen Titans, both of which are adapted from the DC Comics superhero team of the same name. It is also the second film of both the Teen Titans Go! series and the regular Teen Titans series, serving as a sequel to both Teen Titans Go! To the Movies (2018) and Teen Titans: Trouble in Tokyo (2006). The film premiered at Comic-Con on July 21, 2019, followed by a digital release on September 24, then followed by a DVD and Blu-ray release on October 15. The events of the film take place during the fifth season of Teen Titans Go! and after the finale of the fifth season of Teen Titans. The film premiered on television on Cartoon Network on February 17, 2020. The film received generally positive reviews from critics. This was the final film appearance of Robert Morse before his death in 2022.

== Plot ==
One year after the defeat of Slade in Teen Titans Go! To the Movies, the 2013 Titans team are battling the Gentleman Ghost as he attempts to rob a bank. He possesses Robin, then Starfire, but when attempting the same trick on Raven, he unintentionally cracks her red Ajna chakra gemstone, which awakens her inner demon's dark power, and results in his defeat. Trigon reveals that Raven's demon half is slowly taking over her and offers to take it away, but she refuses to give it to him.

Suddenly, the Titans are abducted by the Master of Games, who is exploring the multiverse with his Worlogog. He pits the 2013 Titans against the original 2003 animated Titans by threatening to destroy the 2003 Titans’ Earth and by telling the 2013 Titans that they have a chance at being taken seriously. Raven is coerced into unleashing her demonic power and 2003 Raven realizes the Master of Games is siphoning her energy. The Master of Games reveals himself to be 2013 Trigon, who uses Raven's energy to partially resurrect 2003 Trigon. The two Trigons kidnap both Ravens and escape to the 2003 Earth to finish absorbing 2013 Raven's powers so they can conquer the multiverse.

The two Titans teams decide to work together to stop the Trigons and rescue their Ravens. 2003 Robin deduces that the Trigons are using a Worlogog from their Earth to travel between dimensions, so a Worlogog must exist in the 2013 dimension too; the 2013 Titans realize it belongs to Santa Claus. The two teams battle Santa and Mrs. Claus and escape by using the device to travel between dimensions, making pit stops in the worlds of other Teen Titans incarnations along the way. They eventually make it to the 2003 Earth, but 2003 Trigon has completely absorbed 2013 Raven's demonic powers. 2013 Trigon consumes 2003 Trigon and transforms into a new powerful being named "Hexagon".

2003 Robin uses the Worlogog to summon all the Titans teams throughout the multiverse to battle Hexagon, but to no avail. This causes 2013 Raven to even the odds by eating all of her counterparts to absorb their powers; she transforms into a black dragon named "The Unkindness". The Titans destroy Trigon's Worlogog and assist Raven in defeating him and getting her powers back. This sends 2003 Trigon into limbo while 2013 Trigon is sent to a zombie Teen Titans dimension.

After 2013 Raven is able to accept her inner demon self, all of the Teen Titans are sent home to their respective dimensions. Upon returning to their Earth, the 2013 Titans are attacked by Darkseid, but refuse to battle him out of exhaustion.

In a mid-credit scene, the 2013 Titans relax at their headquarters, ignoring Darkseid's attack upon Jump City.

== Cast ==
- Scott Menville as Robin (Teen Titans and Teen Titans Go!)
- Hynden Walch as Starfire (Teen Titans and Teen Titans Go!)
- Khary Payton as Cyborg (Teen Titans and Teen Titans Go!)
- Tara Strong as Raven (Teen Titans and Teen Titans Go!)
- Greg Cipes as Beast Boy (Teen Titans and Teen Titans Go!)
- Kevin Michael Richardson as Trigon (Teen Titans and Teen Titans Go!)
- Rhys Darby as Master of Games
- "Weird Al" Yankovic as Gentleman Ghost / Darkseid
- Robert Morse as Santa Claus
- Grey DeLisle as Mrs. Claus / Bank Teller
- Sean Maher as Nightwing

Characters that make silent appearances: various iterations of the Teen Titans from other dimensions, Terra, Batman, and Silkie.

== Release ==
The film premiered at San Diego Comic-Con on July 21, 2019, followed by a digital release on September 24, and a DVD and Blu-ray release on October 15. It also premiered in India on October 22, 2022 in the form of The Teen Titans Specials on Cartoon Network.

== Reception ==
The film was released to positive reviews. Based on 5 reviews collected on Rotten Tomatoes, the film has an approval rating of 100% with an average rating of 8.30.

IGN gave the film an 8 out of 10 stating: "Another awesome animated effort from DC/Warner Bros., Teen Titans Go! vs. Teen Titans is a super fun film perfectly primed to debut at San Diego Comic-Con. Filled with classic characters and fan-satisfying fun, this chaotic cartoon crossover is sure to delight even the crankiest Teen Titans fans and the cheekiest Teen Titans Go! diehards. Basically, no matter where you're entering this arena from you'll have a titanic good time as you join these two teams on a multiverse-hopping journey through time, space, and... Santa!"

CBR.com gave the film a positive review: "Teen Titans Go! vs. Teen Titans isn't the most revolutionary film ever, nor does it reach the truly ambitious scale that last year's Teen Titans Go! To the Movies or the thematically similar Spider-Man: Into the Spider-Verse managed to be. But as a love letter to the franchise that incorporates plenty of humor and heart, the new movie succeeds. The film proves that no matter what form they come in, the Teen Titans can have compelling and emotional stories, even amidst gags about superhumans fighting Santa's elves".

Fanbasepress awarded the film an overall positive: "All in all, this is a great movie that both kids and adults alike will love".

Teen Titans Go! vs. Teen Titans has earned $250,500 from domestic DVD sales and $450,484 from domestic Blu-ray sales, bringing its total domestic home video earnings to $700,984.

== Sequels ==
Warner Bros. Animation released a third Teen Titans Go! film, Teen Titans Go! See Space Jam, where they crossover with Space Jam as a way to promote Space Jam: A New Legacy in 2021.

Warner Bros. Animation also released a fourth Teen Titans Go! film, Teen Titans Go! & DC Super Hero Girls: Mayhem in the Multiverse, where they crossover with DC Super Hero Girls.
