= Greg Cipes =

American actor (born 1980)

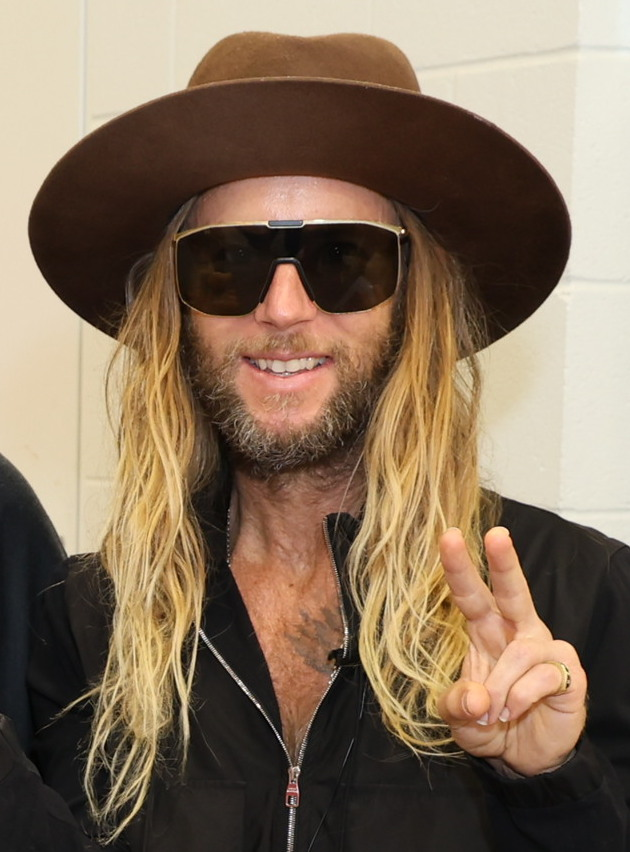
- Cipes at Animate! Columbus in 2023
- Born: January 4, 1980 (age 46); Coral Springs, Florida, U.S.
- Occupation: Actor
- Years active: 2002–present
- Agent: Innovative Artists
- Website: www.gregcipes.com

Greg Cipes (born January 4, 1980) is an American actor. He is best known for his voice roles as Beast Boy in Teen Titans, Teen Titans Go!, Young Justice, and Beast Boy: Lone Wolf; Michelangelo in Teenage Mutant Ninja Turtles (2012) and Kevin Levin in the Ben 10 franchise (beginning with Ben 10: Alien Force). He has made appearances on television series including Gilmore Girls, Deadwood, and Roseanne's Nuts. From 2009 to 2018, he appeared in a recurring role as Chuck in the ABC television series The Middle. His film career includes playing the character Dwight Mueller in Fast & Furious, Reed in National Lampoon's Pledge This!, and Sam in Vile.

== Early life ==
Cipes was born in Coral Springs, Florida, on January 4, 1980. He grew up in a large family of nine brothers and sisters. Inspired to be an actor at an early age, he would make his professional off-Broadway acting and singing debut at 13. At the age of 16, he wrote, recorded, and self-produced his first single. Growing up, he was also an avid surfer who won several competitions, eventually ranking #3 in junior surfing, at the age of 17, he was nationally ranked as a junior professional surfer. He graduated from Coral Springs High School in 1998. In 2001, Cipes moved to Los Angeles.

== Career ==
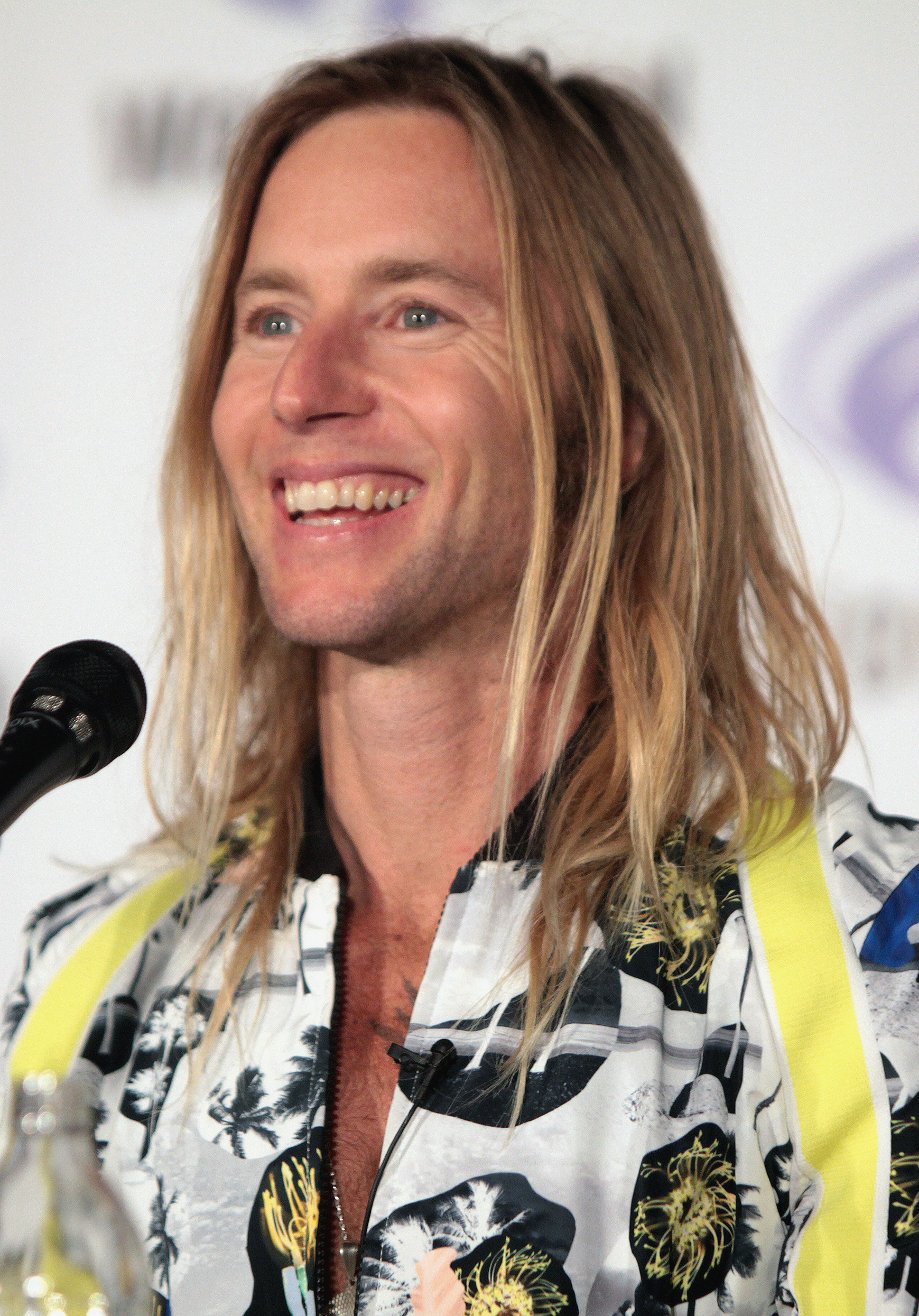
Cipes at WonderCon 2016

Cipes was the voice of Beast Boy in the animated television series Teen Titans and Kevin Levin in the Ben 10 franchise. He also voices Stinkfly in the Ben 10 reboot series. In 2013, he reprised the role of Beast Boy in the spin-off series Teen Titans Go!, as well as video games based on Teen Titans and the online game DC Universe Online. In 2018, he voiced the character in the theatrical film Teen Titans Go! To the Movies. Cipes has also voiced Beast Boy in Young Justice, TV movies and video games. He voiced Atlas in the Astro Boy anime series in 2003, as well as Chiro in Super Robot Monkey Team Hyperforce Go! in 2004.

In 2012, he began working on Nickelodeon's Teenage Mutant Ninja Turtles voicing Michelangelo. Like Beast Boy Cipes has provided the voice of Michelangelo in multiple video games. In 2011, he began voicing Steve Jackson on Disney Channels Fish Hooks, From 2012 to 2017, he voiced Danny Rand / Iron Fist on the Disney XD series Ultimate Spider-Man. He also voiced Tu in The Legend of Korra. Cipes has had another recurring roles such as Mort in Milo Murphy’s Law, Zatt in Star Wars: The Clone Wars, Brandt in The Adventures of Puss in Boots, Craz in Gravity Falls and Jake in SciGirls.

Cipes has made numerous appearances in television, in both commercials and television programs. He was one of seven friends in the MTV reality show Twentyfourseven. Cipes made some guest appearances on One on One as Butter, one of Arnaz Ballard's band members. He guest starred on House M.D. in the episode "Family" as a cane salesman. He has made appearances in the television series Gilmore Girls, in the season four episode "Ted Koppel's Big Night Out"; Ghost Whisperer in the episode "Love Still Won't Die"; the Bones season six episode "The Body and the Bounty" as a freegan; played a man who camps out in Roseanne's yard in her series Roseanne's Nuts, and on Deadwood. In 2002, he had a recurring role as Tanner in ABC’s MDs. From 2009 to 2018, he had a recurring role as Chuck in the ABC television series The Middle. Cipes has also made live action film appearances playing with his first role coming in 2004, playing Trevor in Club Dread he has since played Dwight Mueller in Fast & Furious (2009) and Reed in National Lampoon's Pledge This! (2006).

Cipes is the front man for the reggae/hip-hop band Cipes and the People. The band has developed a following in Southern California, and other parts of the United States and Asia. Their first album, Conscious Revolution, was released by High Valley Entertainment on September 18, 2007. The song "Rescue" on the band's 2007 debut release Conscious Revolution features teenage pop star Jesse McCartney. Cipes also works as a singer in clubs in Los Angeles. He has released music videos for the songs "Fade Away", "Free Me", and "Oh Why Oh Why (Greg Cipes and Jah Sun)". Cipes is also a co-founder of the "Love Street Festival" in Laurel Canyon.

Cipes was the announcer for Cartoon Network from July to October 2008. In April 2017, he and Kevin Coulston created a new animated political parody improv series on Kickstarter, called A Fowl American. The story takes place on Planet Earth, where humanity has been wiped out. Animals rule the land, but President Rump, a parody of Donald Trump, is determined to repeat history.

== Personal life ==
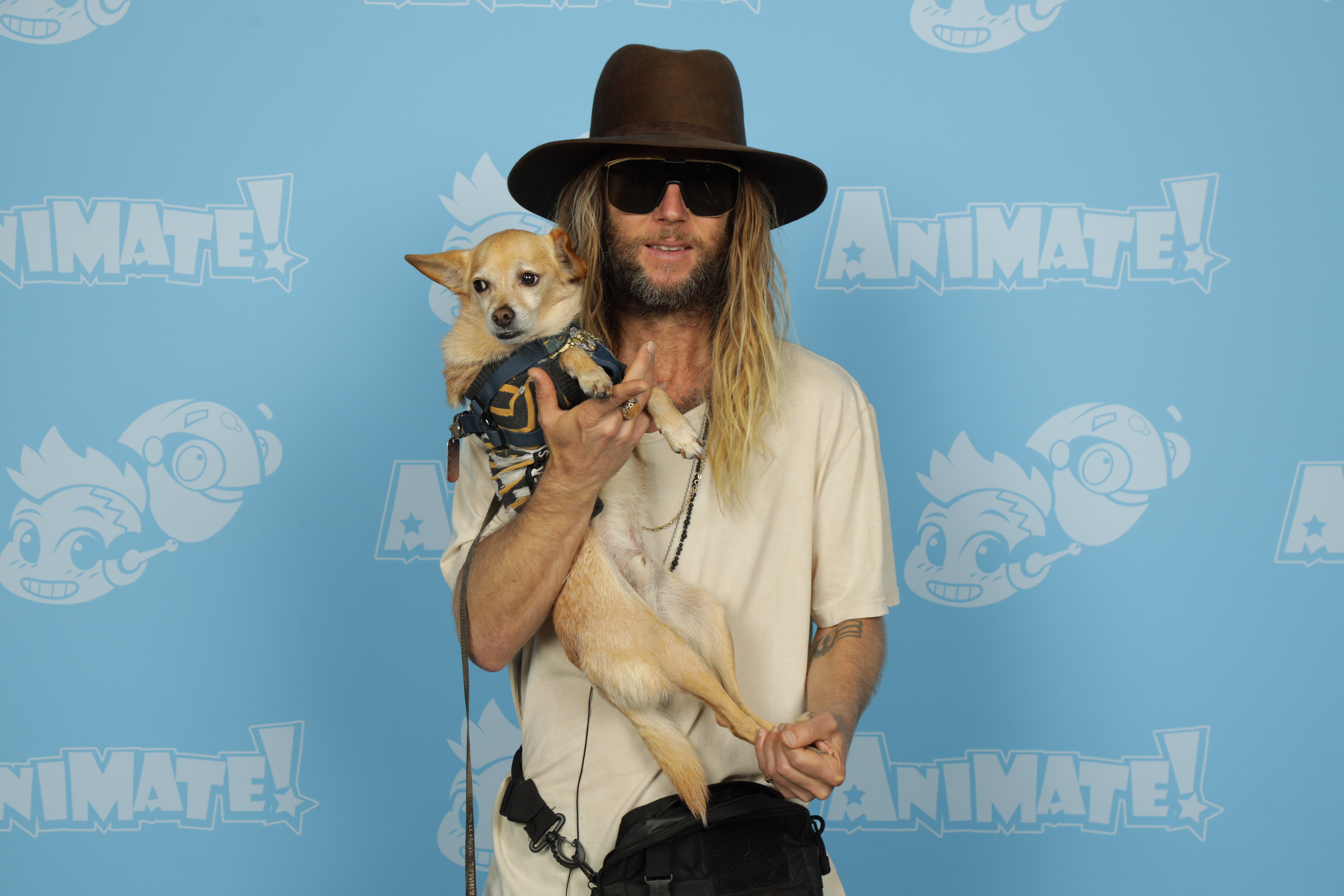
Cipes with his dog Wingman in 2023

Cipes was raised a Messianic Jew and identified as a "Christian Jew" in 2019. He previously identified as irreligious in 2017, saying he was "free of mental slavery and hypocrisy" and jokingly claiming to be a "believer in dog". Cipes is a survivor of skin cancer.

Cipes has a dog named Wingman, who served as the inspiration and namesake for Beast Boy's emotional support dog in Young Justice. Cipes is a board member of the Kids Venice Basketball League (KVBL) Natural Leaders program in Los Angeles. Which is a youth outreach initiative connects underprivileged youth with holistic and sustainable life skills.

Cipes became a vegetarian at the age of eight before switching to veganism in 2009.

Cipes regularly attends comic book conventions.

On March 4, 2025, Cipes announced on his social media that he had been diagnosed with early-onset Parkinson's disease. He later alleged that Warner Bros. terminated him from his role as Beast Boy on Teen Titans Go! on Valentine's Day. Sources close to the production disputed this, stating that the decision was based on performance-related concerns rather than his diagnosis and that Cipes was offered the opportunity to voice a new character as part of an ongoing development deal.

== Filmography ==
=== Voice-over roles ===
==== Animation ====
List of voice performances in animation
Year	Series	Role	Notes	Source
2003–2006	Teen Titans	Beast Boy, Adonis		
2003, 2005	All Grown Up!	J.R., Lil' Red	2 episodes	
2003	Justice League	Jack	Episode: "Wild Cards"	
2003	Whatever Happened to... Robot Jones?	Jacko Jr., College Guy, Kid #4	Episode: "Summer Camp/Rules of Dating"	
2004–2007	Astro Boy	Daichi / Atlas	English dub	
2004	Rocket Power	Goth and Ballad Backup	Episode: "The Big Day"	
2004	Father of the Pride	Orangutan	3 episodes	
2004	W.I.T.C.H.	Caleb		
2004–2006	Super Robot Monkey Team Hyperforce Go!	Chiro, additional voices		
2005	Totally Spies!	Dean	4 episodes	
2007–2008	Fifi and the Flowertots	Bumble (Fuzzbuzz)	American dub	
2008–2010	Ben 10: Alien Force	Kevin Levin, Forever Knight #4, Teenager		
2010–2023	SciGirls	Jake		
2010	Kick Buttowski: Suburban Daredevil	Horace, Emo Kid		
2010–2012	Ben 10: Ultimate Alien	Kevin Levin		
2011–2013	Fish Hooks	Steve Jackson	8 episodes	
2012–2017	Ultimate Spider-Man	Danny Rand / Iron Fist, additional voices		
2012–2017	Teenage Mutant Ninja Turtles	Michelangelo, Rodriguez, Lil' Rineo, Pizza Delivery Boy		
2012–2014	The Legend of Korra	Tu, Mako & Bolin's Cousin		
2012–2014	Ben 10: Omniverse	Kevin Levin, Grick		
2012–2016	Gravity Falls	Craz		
2012	Star Wars: The Clone Wars	Zatt	4 episodes	
2012	Generator Rex	Sly	Episode: "Rock My World"	
2013–2026	Teen Titans Go!	Beast Boy (S1–S9), Puppet Wizard, Himself, Richard Nixon, Starro, various voices		
2013	Lego Marvel Super Heroes: Maximum Overload	Iron Fist		
2014	Robot Chicken	Michelangelo, Dwork, Lucas Wolenczak	Episode: "Super Guitario Center"	
2014	The Fairly OddParents	Chester McBadBat	Episode: "Dimmsdale Tales"; uncredited	
2014	Robot and Monster	Vapid Milquetoast	Episode: "Monster Hit"	
2015–2018	The Adventures of Puss in Boots	Brandt		
2016	The Loud House	Luke Loud	Episode: "One of the Boys"	
2016–2019	Star vs. the Forces of Evil	Tad, Headphone Jones, Aaron Dominic		
2016–2019	Milo Murphy's Law	Mort		
2016–2021	Ben 10	Stinkfly, Kevin Levin, additional voices		
2016–2017	TMNT Summer Shorts	Michelangelo	Shorts: "Turtles Take Time (and Space)" and "Teenage Mecha Ninja Turtles"	
2018	Avengers Assemble	Iron Fist	Episode: "The Immortal Weapon"	
2018	Mighty Magiswords	Noel Trobblin, Frog Monster, Evil Tree #6		
2019–2022	Young Justice	Beast Boy		
2019–2020	Rise of the Teenage Mutant Ninja Turtles	S.H.E.L.L.D.O.N	5 episodes	
2020	DuckTales	Vero	2 episodes	
2020	The Mighty Ones	Josh	Episode: "Creepy Caterpillar/Code of Silence"	
2020	Cleopatra in Space	Cyrano	Episode: "Cyrano"	
2023	Puppy Dog Pals	Jack	Episode: "Baby Crib Caper/Here's Looking at You, Kid"	

==== Film ====
List of voice performances in films
Year	Series	Role	Notes	Source
2005	Super Robot Monkey Team Hyperforce Go! the Movie: The I, Chiro Saga	Chiro, Glenny		
2006	The Wild	Ryan		
2006	Teen Titans: Trouble in Tokyo	Beast Boy		
2013	Lego Marvel Super Heroes: Maximum Overload	Iron Fist		
2016	Lego DC Comics Super Heroes: Justice League: Gotham City Breakout	Beast Boy		
2016	DC Super Hero Girls: Hero of the Year	Beast Boy		
2016	Trolland	Flint, Klorg, Oppenhop		
2017	DC Super Hero Girls: Intergalactic Games	Beast Boy, Iron		
2017	Lego DC Super Hero Girls: Brain Drain	Beast Boy		
2018	Lego DC Super Hero Girls: Super-Villain High	Beast Boy		
2018	Teen Titans Go! To the Movies	Beast Boy		
2018	DC Super Hero Girls: Legends of Atlantis	Beast Boy		
2019	Teen Titans Go! vs. Teen Titans	Beast Boy, OG Beast Boy		
2020	Ben 10 Versus the Universe: The Movie	Kevin Levin		
2021	Teen Titans Go! See Space Jam	Beast Boy		
2022	Teen Titans Go! & DC Super Hero Girls: Mayhem in the Multiverse	Beast Boy		

==== Video games ====
List of voice performances in video games
Year	Series	Role	Notes	Source
2003	True Crime: Streets of LA	Additional voices		
2006	Teen Titans	Beast Boy		
2007	Hot Shots Tennis	Cody		
2007	MySims	Buddy		
2008	Ben 10: Alien Force	Kevin Levin		
2009	FusionFall	Kevin Levin		
2009	Ben 10 Alien Force: Vilgax Attacks	Kevin Levin		
2010	Ben 10 Ultimate Alien: Cosmic Destruction	Kevin Levin		
2011	Ben 10: Galactic Racing	Kevin Levin		
2013	Teenage Mutant Ninja Turtles	Michelangelo		
2013	Lego Marvel Super Heroes	Shocker, Toad		
2014	Disney Infinity 2.0	Iron Fist		
2014	Teenage Mutant Ninja Turtles: Danger of the Ooze	Michelangelo		
2016	Teenage Mutant Ninja Turtles: Portal Power	Michelangelo		
2016	Teeny Titans	Beast Boy		
2016	Lego Dimensions	Beast Boy		
2018	Lego DC Super-Villains	Beast Boy		
2020	Ben 10: Power Trip	Kevin Levin		
2022	Nickelodeon Extreme Tennis	Michelangelo		
2024	Teenage Mutant Ninja Turtles: Wrath of the Mutants	Michelangelo		
2025	Nicktoons & The Dice of Destiny	Michelangelo		

=== Live-action roles ===
==== Film ====
List of acting performances in film
Year	Series	Role	Notes	Source
2004	Club Dread	Trevor		Resume
2004	Ring of Darkness	Gordo		IMDb
2005	Stress, Orgasms, and Salvation	Water		Resume
2005	Kathy T	Curtis		Resume
2006	The Boys & Girls Guide to Getting Down	Drunk Driver		Resume
2006	Simon Says	Zack		Resume
2006	John Tucker Must Die	Guy at Party #4		Resume
2006	National Lampoon's Pledge This!	Reed		Resume
2007	Supergator	Shaun		Resume
2008	The Onion Movie	Hippie Diplomant		Resume
2008	Killer Pad	Vance		Resume
2009	Fast & Furious	Dwight Mueller		Resume
2011	Vile	Sam		Resume
2015	Unfriended	Barking Dog	Uncredited	

==== Television ====
List of acting performances in television
Year	Series	Role	Notes	Source
2002	MDs	Tanner	Recurring role, 10 episodes	Resume
2003	Gilmore Girls	Brennon Lewis	Episode: "Ted Koppel's Big Night Out"	Resume
2003	Peacemakers	Will Johnston	Recurring role	Resume
2004	Deadwood	Miles Anderson	2 episodes	Resume
2004	One on One	Butter/Jesse	8 episodes	Resume
2005–07	Ghost Whisperer	Jamey Barton	3 episodes	Resume
2006	Twentyfourseven	Greg	Reality television series, as himself, cast member	
2006	Cold Case	Greg Wells	Episode: "Saving Sammy"	Resume
2007	Raines	Hunter	Episode: "Stone Dead"	Resume
2007	House M.D.	Cane Salesman	Episode: "Family"	Resume
2007	Without a Trace	Wayne	Episode: "Two of Us"	Resume
2009	Nite Tales: The Series	Surfer	Episode: "Trapped"	Resume
2009	Samantha Who?	Street Musician	Episode: "The Rock Star"	Resume
2010–18	The Middle	Chuck	Recurring role (13 episodes)	
2010	True Blood	Bufort Norris	2 episodes	Resume
2011	CSI: Miami	Phil Pinkerton	Episode: "Dead Ringer"	
2012	NCIS: Los Angeles	Drunk Guy	Episode: “Skin Deep”	

== Awards and nominations ==
Year	Award	Work	Category	Result
2013	Behind The Voice Actor Awards	Teenage Mutant Ninja Turtles	Best Vocal Ensemble in a New Television Series	Nominated
2013	Behind The Voice Actor Awards	Teenage Mutant Ninja Turtles	Best Male Lead Vocal Performance in a Television Series - Action/Drama	Nominated
2013	Behind The Voice Actor Awards	Teenage Mutant Ninja Turtles	Best New Vocal Interpretation of an Established Character	Nominated
2014	Behind The Voice Actor Awards	Teenage Mutant Ninja Turtles	Best Vocal Ensemble in a Television Series - Action/Drama	Nominated
2014	Behind The Voice Actor Awards	Teenage Mutant Ninja Turtles	Best Male Lead Vocal Performance in a Television Series - Action/Drama	Nominated
2014	Behind The Voice Actor Awards	Ben 10: Omniverse	Best Vocal Ensemble in a Television Series - Action/Drama	Nominated
2014	Behind The Voice Actor Awards	Teen Titans Go!	Best Vocal Ensemble in a New Television Series	Won
2015	Behind The Voice Actor Awards	Teenage Mutant Ninja Turtles	Best Vocal Ensemble in a Television Series - Action/Drama	Nominated
2015	Behind The Voice Actor Awards	Ben 10: Omniverse	Best Vocal Ensemble in a Television Series - Action/Drama	Won
2015	Behind The Voice Actor Awards	Teenage Mutant Ninja Turtles	Best Male Lead Vocal Performance in a Television Series - Action/Drama	Won
2016	Behind The Voice Actor Awards	Teenage Mutant Ninja Turtles	Best Vocal Ensemble in a Television Series	Nominated
2017	Behind The Voice Actor Awards	Teenage Mutant Ninja Turtles	Best Vocal Ensemble in a Television Series	Won
2017	Behind The Voice Actor Awards	Milo Murphy’s Law	Best Vocal Ensemble in a New Television Series	Nominated
2017	Behind The Voice Actor Awards	DC Super Hero Girls: Hero of the Year	Best Male Vocal Performance in a TV Special/Direct-to-DVD Title or Short	Nominated
2017	Behind The Voice Actor Awards	DC Super Hero Girls: Hero of the Year	Best Vocal Ensemble in a TV Special/Direct-to-DVD Title or Short	Nominated
