= Hynden Walch =

American actress (born 1971)

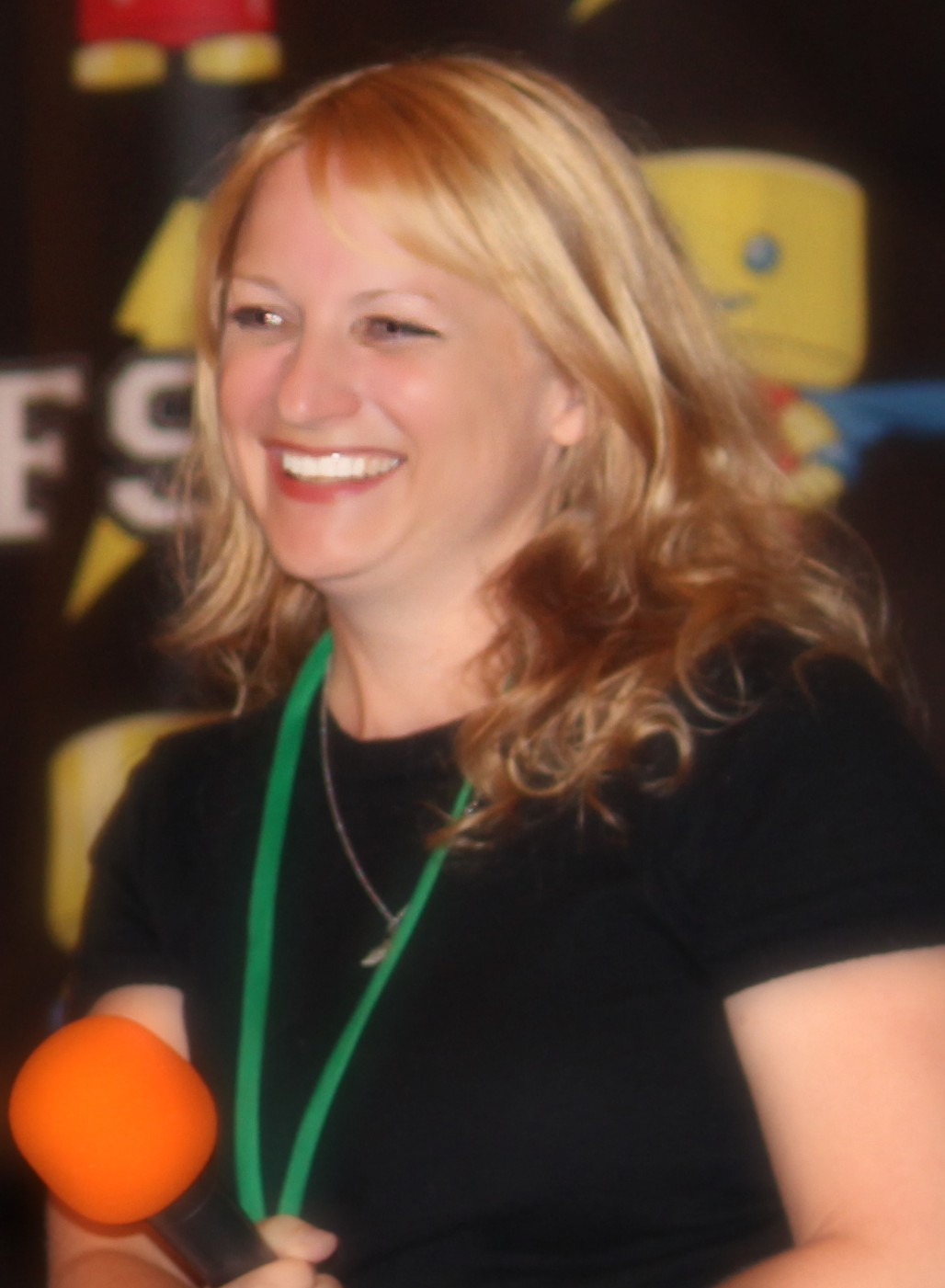
- Walch at Florida Supercon in 2013
- Born: February 1, 1971 (age 55); Davenport, Iowa, U.S.
- Education: University of California, Los Angeles (BA)
- Occupation: Actress
- Years active: 1992–present
- Spouse: Sean McDermott (m. 1999)
- Website: hyndenwalchofficial.com

Hynden Walch (born February 1, 1971) is an American actress best known for voicing Starfire in the Teen Titans franchise and Princess Bubblegum in Adventure Time. She has also voiced Penny Sanchez in ChalkZone, Elsie in Stanley, Alice May in Scooby-Doo! Mystery Incorporated, young Nia Teppelin in Gurren Lagann and Yutaka Kobayakawa in Lucky Star. Outside of animation, Walch has appeared in live-action films like Groundhog Day and Jerry Maguire, and TV series like Law & Order.

== Biography ==
Walch was born on February 1, 1971 in Davenport, Iowa. She is of German descent. She started her professional acting career on stage at age 11. At 16, she attended the North Carolina School of the Arts, majoring in voice. In 1989, she received the Presidential Scholarship and went to the UNC School of the Arts in Winston-Salem, North Carolina. After UNC, she went to Chicago, Illinois, where she did plays, including The Rise and Fall of Little Voice on Broadway, where she won the Outer Critics Circle Award for her performance as the title character. As a high school senior, she was awarded as a Presidential Scholar in the Arts in drama. In 2005, she graduated summa cum laude from UCLA with a B.A. in American Literature and founded the Hillside Produce Cooperative, a free exchange of local, organically grown food, for which she was named runner up Citizen Entrepreneur of the Year by Global Green USA. Hynden has been married to Sean McDermott since 1999.

On television, she voiced Starfire in Teen Titans, Penny Sanchez on the Nickelodeon show ChalkZone, Elsie on the Playhouse Disney show Stanley, Ace in Justice League and Justice League Unlimited, Harley Quinn in The Batman and in anime, she has voiced Amy Stapleton in IGPX, Emiri Kimidori in The Melancholy of Haruhi Suzumiya, Yutaka Kobayakawa in Lucky Star, and Nia Teppelin in Tengen Toppa Gurren Lagann. She also voiced both Alice and Wendy Darling in various Disney media after she replaced Kathryn Beaumont who played both characters in Alice in Wonderland, and Peter Pan.

In video games, she voiced Jasmine and Junko in Viewtiful Joe: Double Trouble! and Coco Bandicoot and Polar in Crash Team Racing. She provided the English voice of Hitomi in Dead or Alive Xtreme 2 and Dead or Alive Paradise. She voiced Viridi, the Goddess of Nature, in Kid Icarus: Uprising, and her performance in the game was met with critical acclaim.

In live action, she played Mae Capone on The Untouchables and Debbie in Groundhog Day.

== Filmography ==
=== Film ===
List of voice performances in animated feature and direct-to-video films
Year	Title	Role	Notes
1998	The Secret of NIMH 2: Timmy to the Rescue	Jenny McBride	Direct-to-video
2000	Tom Sawyer	Becky Thatcher	Direct-to-video
2000	Aladdin and the Adventure of All-Time	Paige	Singing voice
2002	The Wild Thornberrys Movie	Schoolgirl	
2005	Karas	Little Girl	English dub
2005	Stanley's Dinosaur Round-Up	Elsie	Direct-to-video
2006	Teen Titans: Trouble in Tokyo	Starfire, Mecha-Boi	Television film
2008	Batman: Gotham Knight	Young Cassandra, young Bruce Wayne	Direct-to-video
2010	Tangled	Additional characters	
2012	Back to the Sea	Tiny Fish	
2012	Big Top Scooby-Doo!	Lena, Joan	Direct-to-video
2012	Winx Club: The Secret of the Lost Kingdom (Nickelodeon dub)	Lockette, Amore	The Nickelodeon version premiered in 2012
2013	Winx Club 3D: Magical Adventure (Nickelodeon dub)	Lockette, Amore	The Nickelodeon version premiered in 2013
2013	Justice League: The Flashpoint Paradox	Yo-Yo	Direct-to-video
2014	Justice League: War	Hannah Grace	Direct-to-video
2014	Batman: Assault on Arkham	Harley Quinn	Direct-to-video
2014	The Tale of the Princess Kaguya	Menowarawa	English dub
2015	The Laws of the Universe Part 0	Halle	English dub; Limited theatrical release
2016	Lego DC Comics Super Heroes: Justice League: Gotham City Breakout	Starfire	Direct-to-video
2016	DC Super Hero Girls: Hero of the Year	Starfire	Direct-to-video
2017	DC Super Hero Girls: Intergalactic Games	Starfire, Blackfire	Direct-to-video
2017	Lego Scooby-Doo! Blowout Beach Bash	Mitzi Capaletto	Direct-to-video
2018	Teen Titans Go! To the Movies	Starfire	
2018	DC Super Hero Girls: Legends of Atlantis	Starfire	Direct-to-video
2018	The Laws of the Universe-Part I	Halle	English dub; Limited theatrical release
2019	Batman: Hush	Harley Quinn	Direct-to-video
2019	Teen Titans Go! vs. Teen Titans	Starfire, Original Starfire	Direct-to-video
2020	Justice League Dark: Apokolips War	Harley Quinn	Direct-to-video
2021	Teen Titans Go! See Space Jam	Starfire	Television film
2022	Teen Titans Go! & DC Super Hero Girls: Mayhem in the Multiverse	Starfire	Direct-to-video

=== Television ===
List of voice performances in television shows
Year	Title	Role	Notes
1998–1999	Oh Yeah! Cartoons	Penny Sanchez, Nerd, Girl #2	2 episodes
1999–2000	Rugrats	Freddie, Toddlers	2 episodes
2001–2004	Stanley	Elsie	Recurring role
2002	Static Shock	Maureen Connor / Permafrost	Episode: "Frozen Out"
2002–2008	ChalkZone	Penny Sanchez	Main role
2003	Gary the Rat	Little Girl	Episode: "Inherit the Cheese"
2003	Justice League	Ace	Episode: "Wild Cards"
2003–2006	Teen Titans	Starfire, Blackfire, Madame Rouge, Argent	Main role
2005	Justice League Unlimited	Ace	Episode: "Epilogue"
2005–2006	Immortal Grand Prix	Amy Stapleton	English dub
2005–2006	Super Robot Monkey Team Hyperforce Go!	Valina	8 episodes
2006	Catscratch	Katilda	2 episodes
2006–2007	American Dragon: Jake Long	Fury, Euryale, Medusa	2 episodes
2007	Random! Cartoons	Ms. Chic, Olympia	Episode: "Hero Heights"
2007	The Melancholy of Haruhi Suzumiya	Emiri Kimidori, Sonou Mori	English dub
2006-2007	Codename: Kids Next Door	Rainbow Monkey Leader, Anchorwoman, Amish Girl	4 episodes
2007	The Batman	Harley Quinn	2 episodes
2008	Lucky Star	Yutaka Kobayakawa	English dub
2008	Tengen Toppa Gurren Lagann	Nia Teppelin	English dub
2009	The Super Hero Squad Show	Jean Grey	Episode: "Mysterious Mayhem at Mutant High!"
2010	Batman: The Brave and the Bold	Platinum, Carbon Dioxide	2 episodes
2010–2013	Scooby-Doo! Mystery Incorporated	Alice May, Obliteratrix	2 episodes
2010–2011	Generator Rex	Breach	7 episodes
2010–2018	Adventure Time	Princess Bubblegum, various voices	Main role
2011–2012	New Teen Titans	Starfire, Blackfire	
2011–2012	Winx Club	Lockette, Amore	Nickelodeon version (specials, 2011 re-dubs of seasons 3 and 4)
2012	ThunderCats	Jonto	Episode: "The Forever Bag"
2012–2016	Doc McStuffins	Bubble Monkey, Nikki	5 episodes
2013–present	Teen Titans Go!	Starfire, Blackfire, Sparkleface, Sticky Jane, Madame Rouge, Opposite Gender Cyborg, Wonder Girl, Herself, various voices	Main role
2013–2015	Henry Hugglemonster	Summer Hugglemonster	Main role
2013	Pound Puppies	Noodles	Episode: "Little Monster"
2014–2019	Avengers Assemble	Princess Python, Supergiant	3 episodes
2014	Transformers: Rescue Bots	Amy	Episode: "Bugs in the System"
2015–present	Mister P	Ellen Pierce	
2015–2018	Guardians of the Galaxy	Supergiant	4 episodes
2015, 2019	Star vs. the Forces of Evil	Pixie Clerk, additional voices	4 episodes
2015, 2017	Penn Zero: Part-Time Hero	Yumi, additional voices	2 episodes
2015–2018	DC Super Hero Girls	Starfire, Blackfire	Recurring role
2016	Lastman	Additional voices	Episode: "Action!"
2018	The Adventures of Kid Danger	Sophiaroni, Flying Skunks, Young Kid Danger	2 episodes
2018–2019	Niko and the Sword of Light	Wispy, Little Girl, Baby Funkfang, Sea Creature	3 episodes
2019–2021	Young Justice	Queen Perdita, Elasti-Girl, Em'ree J'onzz	10 episodes
2019	Green Eggs and Ham	Diabolical Shackle, Family Kid, Inventor #1, One Fish, Can Opener, Patron #2	7 episodes
2020	Robot Chicken	Wasp, Amazon Alexa	Episode: "Babe Hollytree in: I Wish One Person Had Died"
2020	Adventure Time: Distant Lands	Princess Bubblegum	Episode: "Obsidian"
2020	DuckTales	Alethiea	Episode: "The Lost Harp of Mervana!"
2023-2025	Adventure Time: Fionna & Cake	Princess Bubblegum, Candy Queen	12 episodes
2026	The Loud House	Chinah	Episode: "Shred of Evidence"
2026	Adventure Time: Side Quests	Princess Bubblegum	
TBA	Starfire	Starfire	

=== Video games ===
List of voice performances in video games
Year	Title	Voice role	Notes
1999	Crash Team Racing	Coco Bandicoot, Polar	
2004	EverQuest II	Kerra, Wood Elf	
2006	Teen Titans	Starfire	
2006	Dead or Alive Xtreme 2	Hitomi	English dub
2009	Cartoon Network Universe: FusionFall	Princess Bubblegum	
2010	Final Fantasy XIII	Cocoon Inhabitants	English dub
2010	Ninety-Nine Nights II	Rinn	English dub
2010	Dead or Alive Paradise	Hitomi	English dub, shared role with Eden Riegel
2011	Kinect: Disneyland Adventures	Alice	
2011	Knights Contract	Rapunzel	
2011	Generator Rex: Agent of Providence	Breach	
2012	Kid Icarus: Uprising	Viridi	English dub
2012	Final Fantasy XIII-2	Additional voices	English dub
2012	Adventure Time: Hey Ice King! Why'd You Steal Our Garbage?!!	Princess Bubblegum	
2013	Adventure Time: Explore the Dungeon Because I Don't Know!	Princess Bubblegum	
2014	Broken Age	M'ggie, Ch't, Rose Maiden	
2014	The Lego Movie Videogame	Additional voices	
2014	Super Smash Bros. for Nintendo 3DS and Wii U	Viridi	English dub; uncredited
2014	The Sims 4	Sim	
2014	Kingdom Hearts HD 2.5 Remix	Alice	Re:coded Cutscenes; English dub
2015	Lego Dimensions	Princess Bubblegum, Starfire	Year 2 additions only
2015	Adventure Time: Finn & Jake Investigations	Princess Bubblegum	
2016	Skylanders Imaginators	Master Chopscotch	
2018	Fallout 76	Maxine Ballard, Miss Rachel, Angie Decland	
2018	Adventure Time: Pirates of the Enchiridion	Princess Bubblegum, Candy Person #2	
2019	Marvel Ultimate Alliance 3: The Black Order	Supergiant	
2020	Fallout 76: Steel Dawn	Dagger	
2025	Disney Speedstorm	Alice	

=== Live-action ===
List of acting performances in feature films and television shows
Year	Title	Role	Notes
1992	Angel Street	Blond	
1993	Groundhog Day	Debbie	
1993–1994	The Untouchables	Mae Capone	
1994	Law & Order	Angel Monroe	Episode: "Blue Bamboo"
1995	Angela	Darlene	
1996	Jake's Women	Waitress	
1996	Sudden Manhattan	Georgie	
1996	Jerry Maguire	Women's Group Member	
1997	The Practice	Sarah Fisher	
1997	The Drew Carey Show	Amy	
2000	Charmed	Marcie Steadwell	
2000	NYPD Blue	Lucy Sperling	
2002	King Rikki	Co-Worker	

=== Theatre ===
List of acting performances in theatre
Year	Title	Role	Notes
1994	The Rise and Fall of Little Voice	Laura Hoff, Little Voice	
1999	The Rocky Horror Show	Columbia	
