= Teen Titans season 5 =

Teen Titans
- Season 5
- DVD cover
- Showrunner: Glen Murakami
- Starring: Greg Cipes; Scott Menville; Khary Payton; Tara Strong; Hynden Walch
- No. of episodes: 13

Release
- Original network: Cartoon Network; Kids' WB
- Original release: September 24, 2005 – January 16, 2006

Season chronology
- ← Previous; Season 4

The fifth and final season of the animated television series Teen Titans, based on the DC comics series of the same time by Bob Haney and Bruno Premiani, originally aired on Cartoon Network in the United States. Developed by Glen Murakami, Sam Register, and television writer David Slack, the series was produced by DC Entertainment and Warner Bros. Animation.

The series focuses on a team of crime-fighting teenage superheroes, consisting of the leader Robin, alien princess Starfire, green shapeshifter Beast Boy, the dark sorceress Raven, and the technological genius Cyborg. This season focuses on Beast Boy as he deals with his past involving the Doom Patrol, and helps the Titans unite heroes to stop the Brotherhood of Evil.

The season premiered on September 24, 2005 and ran until January 16, 2006, broadcasting 13 episodes. Warner Bros. Home Video released the fifth season on DVD in the United States and Canada on July 22, 2008. Upon its release, the season received critical acclaim with many critics regarding it as the best season of the series. It was praised for its variety of storylines and its expanded cast of characters, despite the final episode being controversial.

== Production ==
Season five of Teen Titans aired on Cartoon Network from September 24, 2005 to January 16, 2006. The season was produced by DC Entertainment and Warner Bros. Animation, executive produced by Sander Schwartz and produced by Glen Murakami, Bruce Timm and Linda M. Steiner. Staff directors for the series included Michael Chang, Heather Maxwell, and Alex Soto. The episodes for the season were written by a team of writers, which consisted of Richard Elliott, Melody Fox, Rob Hoegee, Greg Klein, Thomas Pugsley, Simon Racioppa, David Slack, and Amy Wolfram. Producer Murakami worked with Derrick Wyatt, Brianne Drouhard, and Jon Suzuki on character design while Hakjoon Kang served as the background designer for the series. The season employed a number of storyboard artists, including Eric Canete, Colin Heck, Kalvin Lee, Keo Thongkham, Scooter Tidwell, Alan Wan, and Matt Youngberg.

== Cast and characters ==
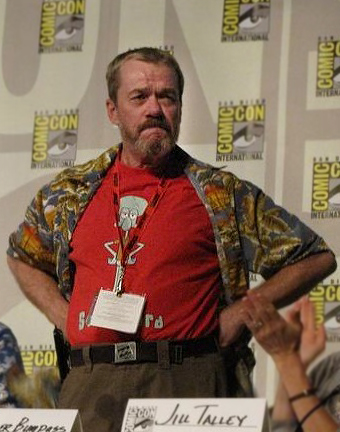
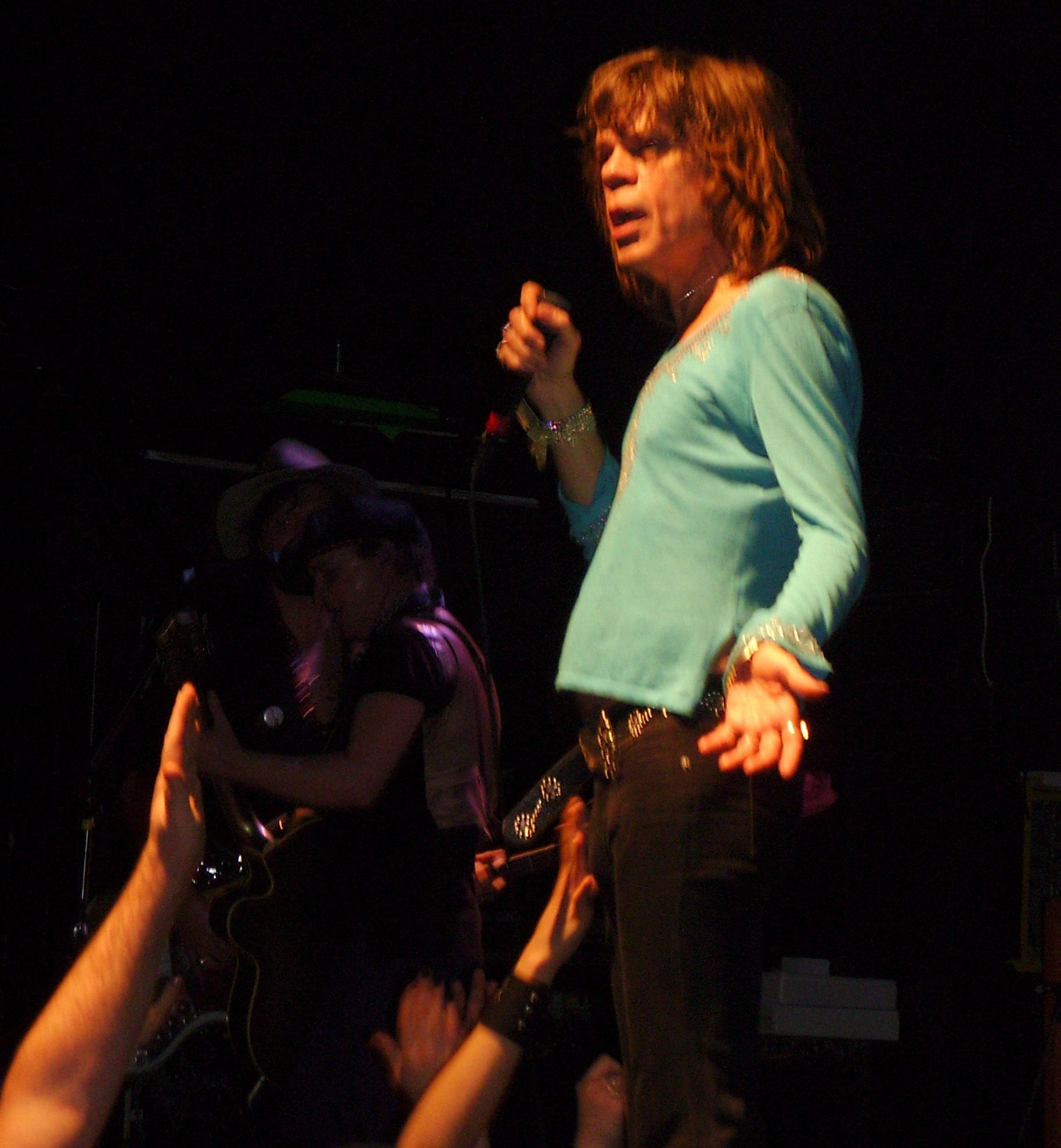
The fifth season featured vocal talents from a variety of veteran film, television and voice actors, including Rodger Bumpass and David Johansen.

The five voice actors for the main characters - Scott Menville, Hynden Walch, Greg Cipes, Tara Strong, and Khary Payton - reprise their roles in the fifth season as Robin, Starfire, Beast Boy, Raven, and Cyborg, respectively. In addition to her role as Raven, Strong voiced Elasti-Girl in the two-part episode "Homecoming" and Kole in the episode "Kole". Walch also provided the voice for Madame Rouge, a villain who is a part of the Brotherhood of Evil, and the character Teether in episode "Hide and Seek". Dee Bradley Baker recurs in the season, providing voices for several characters, including André LeBlanc, Cinderblock, Silkie, and Wildebeest. Lauren Tom reprises her role as Jinx in three episodes of the season. Glenn Shadix appeared in the series, voicing the season's main villain The Brain and Monsieur Mallah. Freddy Rodriguez recurred in the season as hero twins Más y Menos.

Season five of Teen Titans featured numerous guest actors providing voices for recurring and guest characters. Diane Delano appeared in this season as Pantha in the eleventh and twelfth episodes of the season. Jason Marsden voiced Billy Numerous and Red Star in two episodes. Michael Rosenbaum voices Kid Flash in "Lightspeed" and "Titans Together". In the two-part episode "Homecoming", members of the Doom Patrol, Beast Boy's former team, appear. Xander Berkeley returns to the series, voicing Mento and Brotherhood of Evil member General Immortus. The episode also features the voices of Peter Onorati, voicing Robotman and Judge Reinhold, voicing Negative Man. The episode "For Real" features T'Keyah Crystal Keymáh, Mike Erwin and Wil Wheaton reprising their roles as Bumblebee, Speedy and Aqualad. Actor Ed O'Ross appeared in the episode "Snowblind" providing the voice for the Raskov. Veteran voice actor Rodger Bumpass, the voice of Squidward Tentacles in SpongeBob SquarePants, reprises his role of Dr. Light in the episode "Kole". The episode "Hide and Seek" features veteran voice actress Russi Taylor (the voice of Minnie Mouse) providing the voices of characters Timmy Tantrum and Melvin. Kevin Michael Richardson returns to the series, providing the voice for Mammoth and See-More in the episode "Lightspeed". In the episode "Revved Up", rock singer David Johansen voiced the villain Ding Dong Daddy. The episode "Go" features actor Gary Anthony Sturgis voicing the Gordanians and Trogaar. In the series finale "Things Change", Ashley Johnson and Ron Perlman reprise their roles as Terra and Slade respectively.

== Reception ==
The season received critical acclaim. Mac McEntire of DVD Verdict awarded the fifth season story a score of 85, deeming it a "flat-out excellent final season". McEntire commended the show's evolution from season one, noting that the season features "smart, emotional and exciting stories within the context of Teen Titans", as well as the introduction of various new characters in the season from the world of the Teen Titans comics. John Sinnott, writing for DVD Talk, deemed the fifth season release as "Highly Recommended". Sinnott commented that with the expanded cast of villains and superheroes in the season, "the shows in this set never get dull". Sinnott also highlighted the alterations made on DC characters to fit within the series' context as a strong point. Sinnott concluded that the season is "stronger than the preceding season" and "hits all the right marks". Randall Cyrenne of Animated Views praised season five as the strongest season, noting that it found "a more even tone that allowed the season to feel cohesive".

== Episodes ==
No. overall	No. in season	Title	Directed by	Written by	Original release date	Prod. code
53	1	"Homecoming"	Michael Chang	Rob Hoegee	September 24, 2005	257-507
54	2	"Homecoming"	Heather Maxwell	Richard Elliott & Simon Racioppa	October 1, 2005	257-508
The Doom Patrol, Beast Boy's former teammates, have been captured and Beast Boy and the Titans have to find them. Later, they discover that the Doom Patrol have been taken captive by their worst enemies, the Brotherhood of Evil. Villain(s): Brotherhood of Evil (The Brain and Monsieur Mallah) The Doom Patrol, now free, get Beast Boy to rejoin the team on their hunt for the Brotherhood of Evil while refusing the Titans' help. While on their mission, each of the Doom Patrol are worn out by the villains of Brotherhood of Evil. Beast Boy and Mento, the last remaining members, infiltrate the Brotherhood's fortress. The Titans and the rest of Doom Patrol join the two. Villain(s): Brotherhood of Evil (The Brain, Monsieur Mallah, Madame Rouge, General Immortus), Adonis, André LeBlanc, Angel, Atlas, Billy Numerous, Cheshire, Cinderblock, Control Freak, Ding Dong Daddy, Doctor Light, Fang, Gizmo, H.I.V.E. Headmistress, I.N.S.T.I.G.A.T.O.R., Jinx, Johnny Rancid, Kardiak, Katarou, Killer Moth, Kitten, Kyd Wykkyd, Mad Mod, Malchior, Mammoth, Master of Games, Mother Mae-Eye, Mumbo, Overload, Plasmus, Phobia, Private H.I.V.E., Psimon, Punk Rocket, Puppet King, Red X, See-More, Source, Steamroller, Trident, Warp, Wintergreen, Witch, Wrestling Star, XL Terrestrial
55	3	"Trust"	Matt Youngberg	Amy Wolfram	October 8, 2005	257-509
The Brotherhood of Evil has begun its plan to eliminate young superheroes across the globe. With honorary Titan Wildebeest captured, Madame Rouge is after the Brotherhood's second target, another honorary Titan known as Hot Spot. Detecting the threat, Teen Titan Robin immediately heads for Morocco. Villain(s): Madame Rouge, The Brain, Monsieur Mallah
56	4	"For Real"	Michael Chang	Melody Fox	October 15, 2005	257-510
As the Teen Titans are away dealing with the Brotherhood of Evil, the Titans East come to Jump City to watch over, but they have some trouble gaining acceptance among the public. Meanwhile, Control Freak escapes from prison, ready to face off against the Teen Titans with a series of challenges designed specifically for them, sure to succeed. Note: Only Cyborg appears via communication. Beast Boy, Raven, Robin and Starfire are absent in this episode. Villain(s): Control Freak, André LeBlanc, Punk Rocket (cameo)
57	5	"Snowblind"	Heather Maxwell	Rob Hoegee	October 29, 2005	257-511
While the Teen Titans are fighting a mysterious creature in Russia, Starfire searches for the monster everywhere by herself and gets lost in a blinding snowstorm. Starfire is rescued by a young radioactive soldier named Red Star, who hides away in a battle shelter to prevent his power from harming others. When the rest of the Titans arrive, however, they find out the creature is derived from his power. Red Star joins the Titans in defeating the radioactive creature, but the battle causes a change in him. Red Star asks Starfire to send him into space, where he releases his power. Red Star is now a Titan. Villain(s): Radiation Monster
58	6	"Kole"	Matt Youngberg	Amy Wolfram	November 5, 2005	257-512
During a fight against a new and improved Dr. Light in the Arctic Circle, the Teen Titans fall through a layer of ice. They find themselves in a jungle where they discover two new superheroes — Kole, and her caveman sidekick, Gnarrk, who invite to their place for nourishment. Doctor Light discovers them too and captures Kole, using her crystal-generating abilities to amplify the effects of his machine. The Titans and Gnarrk find Kole and Dr. Light, and a battle ensues. Gnarrk overcomes his technophobia and destroys Dr. Light's machine while saving Kole. The Titans give Kole and Gnarrk a Titans locator, which the Brotherhood of Evil tracks down from their headquarters. Villain(s): Dr. Light
59	7	"Hide and Seek"	Michael Chang	Amy Wolfram	November 12, 2005	257-513
Raven is tasked with bringing three young superheroes – Melvin, Timmy Tantrum, and Teether – to a monastery while avoiding interference from Monsieur Mallah. The task proves difficult as Raven's patience with the kids' tantrums is tested. Absent: Cyborg and Starfire Villain(s): Monsieur Mallah
60	8	"Lightspeed"	Heather Maxwell	Rob Hoegee, George Pérez & Marv Wolfman	December 3, 2005	257-514
While the Titans are away, the H.I.V.E. Five cause panic in the city, committing various crimes, but Kid Flash interrupts their crime spree before being captured. Absent: Robin, Starfire, Cyborg, Raven and Beast Boy Villain(s): H.I.V.E. Five (Jinx, Gizmo, Mammoth, See-More, Kyd Wykkyd, Billy Numerous), Madame Rouge
61	9	"Revved Up"	Matt Youngberg	John Esposito	December 10, 2005	257-515
When Ding Dong Daddy steals a briefcase containing Robin's most prized possession, Robin races him to get it back, with the rest of the Titans and a host of villains joining in. Villain(s): Ding Dong Daddy, Red X
62	10	"Go!"	Michael Chang	David Slack	December 17, 2005	257-516
The episode tells the origins of the Teen Titans. Starfire escapes capture from the Gordanians and lands on Earth, causing mayhem for the town. Robin, Beast Boy, Raven, and Cyborg arrive to stop her. When they calm her down, the Gordanians call for Starfire to return or Jump City will be destroyed, and they work together for the first time to help her stop them. Villain(s): Starfire (initially), Trogaar, Robber
63	11	"Calling All Titans"	Heather Maxwell	Amy Wolfram	January 7, 2006	257-517
As the Teen Titans return to Jump City, the Brotherhood of Evil get ready for their final attack. When the Brotherhood of Evil make their move, the Teen Titans have begun recruiting young superheroes. As the ultimate battle between the Titans and the Brotherhood of Evil begins, Robin has a strategy of his own. Villain(s): Brotherhood of Evil (Adonis, Angel, Atlas, Billy Numerous, The Brain, Cheshire, Cinderblock, Control Freak, Creature from Jones Lake, Fang, General Immortus, Gizmo, I.N.S.T.I.G.A.T.O.R., Johnny Rancid, Kardiak, Katarou, Killer Moth, Kitten, Kyd Wykkyd, Madame Rouge, Mammoth, Monsieur Mallah, Off-World Outlaw, Overload, Plasmus, Private H.I.V.E., Psimon, Punk Rocket, Puppet King, See-More, Steamroller, Trident, Warp, XL Terrestrial, 7-Gorn-7)
64	12	"Titans Together"	Matt Youngberg	Rob Hoegee	January 14, 2006	257-518
With all the Titans scattered across the globe and the Brotherhood of Evil taking down young superheroes one by one, Beast Boy leads Pantha, Mas, Herald, and Jericho – the only ones left – to take on the Brotherhood and rescue the Titans. Ultimately Beast Boy frees all the Titans from being frozen by the Brain, who all fight the Titans' rogues gallery. Kid Flash and Jinx show up as a couple and help the Titans in the fight. Robin captures the Brain and then offers all of the heroes a communicator and thanks them for their help. The episode ends with the Titans and the fifty new extended members ready for all their future fights, together. Villain(s): Brotherhood of Evil (Adonis, André LeBlanc, Angel, Billy Numerous, The Brain, Cheshire, Cinderblock, Control Freak, Ding Dong Daddy, Fang, General Immortus, Gizmo, H.I.V.E. Headmistress, I.N.S.T.I.G.A.T.O.R., Johnny Rancid, Kardiak, Katarou, Killer Moth, Kitten, Kyd Wykkyd, Madame Rouge, Mad Mod, Malchior, Mammoth, Master of Games, Monsieur Mallah, Mother Mae-Eye, Mumbo, Overload, Phobia, Plasmus, Private H.I.V.E., Professor Chang, Psimon, Punk Rocket, Puppet King, See-More, Steamroller, Trident, Warp, Wintergreen, Wrestling Star, XL Terrestrial) and Dr. Light
65	13	"Things Change"	Michael Chang	Amy Wolfram	January 16, 2006	257-519
The Titans return from their adventures to find that the city has changed. Upon their return, they are faced with fighting a shapeshifting, seemingly invincible monster. While exploring the city, Beast Boy spots a girl that looks like Terra, and later finds her stone body gone from the caves. The girl refuses to hang out with Beast Boy, but after he persists, she agrees to talk to him. Beast Boy tries to tell her that she is Terra and jog her memory, but she persists that she isn't someone who was a hero. Beast Boy gets into a fight with a robotic version of Slade, who has returned, where he and Terra had their first date who insists that Terra does not want to remember him. Beast Boy makes another attempt to talk to Terra and wants things to go back, but she tells him that she isn't the hero he thinks she is and that things aren't how he remembers them, and that she can't be friends with him again. Terra essentially confirms her identity, but departs before Beast Boy can make any progress. He is then called to help the other Titans defeat the monster as he runs towards a bright white light. Villain(s): Slade, Unknown White Monster

== DVD release ==
The DVD boxset was released on July 22, 2008 in the United States and Canada. It features a series title "Teen Titans: Know Your Foes", featurette which is segmented for each of the series main villains.

Teen Titans - The Complete Fifth Season
Set details	Special features
13 episodes; 2-disc set (DVD); 1.33:1 aspect ratio; Subtitles: English; Language: English (Stereo)	Featurettes; "Access Top-Secret Files from the Teen Titans: Know Your Foes Featurette Gallery"; Easter Eggs
DVD release date
United States	Canada
July 22, 2008
