= Teen Titans season 3 =

Teen Titans
- Season 3
- Region 1 DVD cover art
- Showrunner: Glen Murakami
- Starring: Greg Cipes; Scott Menville; Khary Payton; Tara Strong; Hynden Walch
- No. of episodes: 13

Release
- Original network: Cartoon Network; Kids' WB
- Original release: August 28, 2004 – December 17, 2005 (Kids' WB)

Season chronology
- ← Previous; Season 2 Next → Season 4

The third season of the animated television series Teen Titans, based on the DC comics series of the same time by Bob Haney and Bruno Premiani, originally aired on Cartoon Network in the United States. Developed by Glen Murakami, Sam Register, and television writer David Slack, the series was produced by DC Entertainment and Warner Bros. Animation. Sander Schwartz was tagged as the executive producer for the series. This marks the last season of Teen Titans being aired on The WB, from September to December 2005, skipping insignificant episodes. It also became the only season that The CW did not re-air during the 2007–08 U.S network television season, as the first two seasons of the series only re-aired on Kids' WB.

The series focuses on a team of crime-fighting teenaged superheroes, consisting of the leader Robin (voiced by Scott Menville), foreign alien princess Starfire, green shapeshifter Beast Boy, the dark sorceress Raven, and the technological genius Cyborg. The season focuses on Cyborg's difficulty accepting his own maturity, and his desire to lead his own team, which brings him into conflict with the Teen Titans (Robin in particular). The season also focuses on his battles with the supervillain Brother Blood.

The season premiered on August 28, 2004 and ran until January 22, 2005 broadcasting 13 episodes. Warner Bros. Home Video released the third season on DVD in the United States and Canada on April 10, 2007. Despite receiving positive reviews, many critics agreed that the third season was inferior to its predecessor.

== Production ==
Season three of Teen Titans aired on Cartoon Network from August 28, 2004 to January 22, 2005. The season was produced by DC Entertainment and Warner Bros. Animation, executive produced by Sander Schwartz and produced by Glen Murakami, Bruce Timm and Linda M. Steiner. Staff directors for the series included Christopher Berkeley, Michael Chang, Heather Maxwell and Alex Soto. The episodes for the season were written by a team of writers, which consisted of Adam Beechen, Rick Copp, Richard Elliott, John Esposito, Louis Hirshorn, Rob Hoegee, Greg Klein, Dwayne McDuffie, Thomas Pugsley, Simon Racioppa, Joelle Sellner, David Slack, Marv Wolfman, and Amy Wolfram. Producer Murakami worked with Derrick Wyatt, Brianne Drouhard, and Jon Suzuki on character design while Hakjoon Kang served as the background designer for the series. The season employed a number of storyboard artists, including Eric Canete, Colin Heck, Kalvin Lee, Keo Thongkham, Scooter Tidwell, Alan Wan, and Matt Youngberg.

== Cast and characters ==
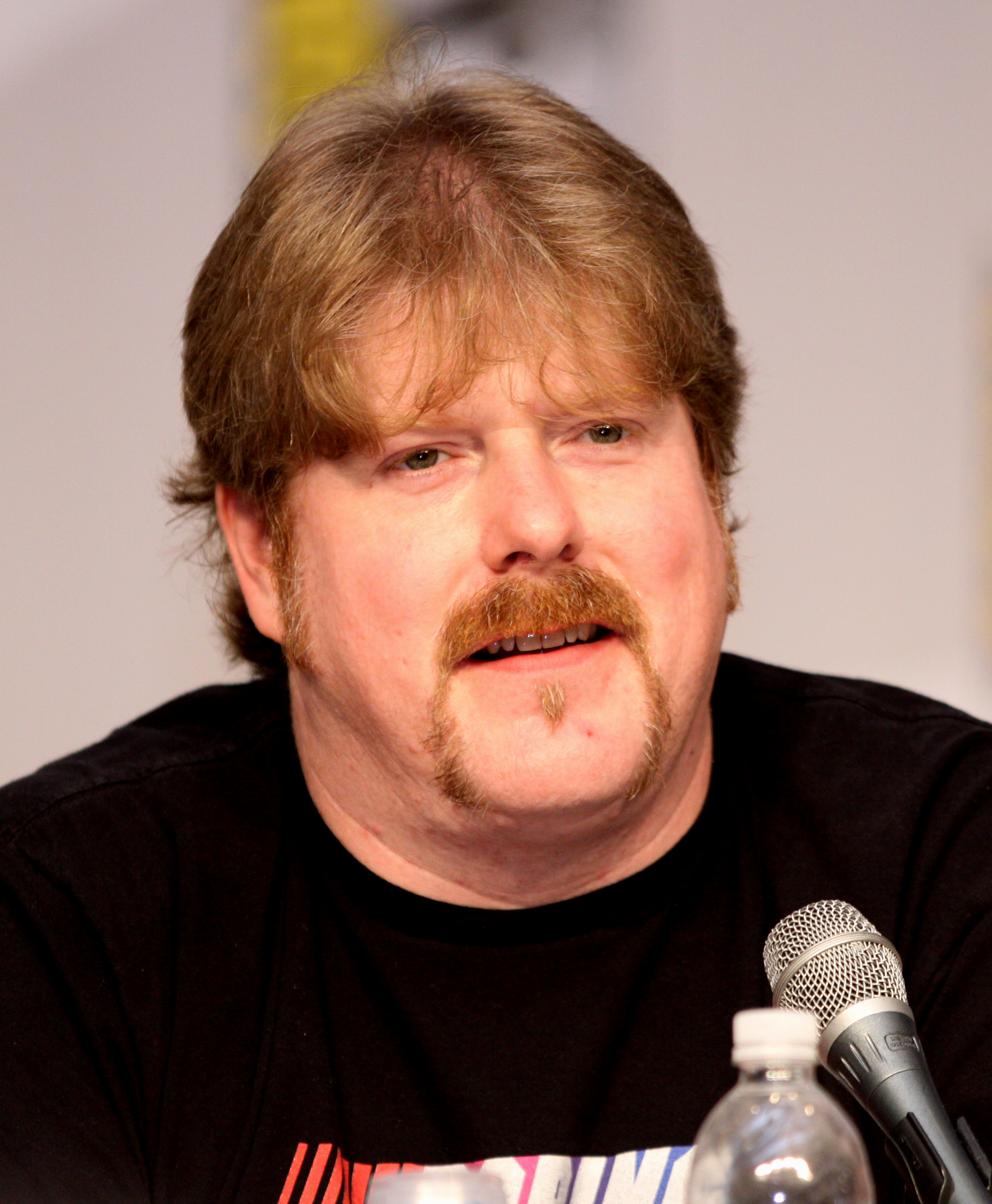
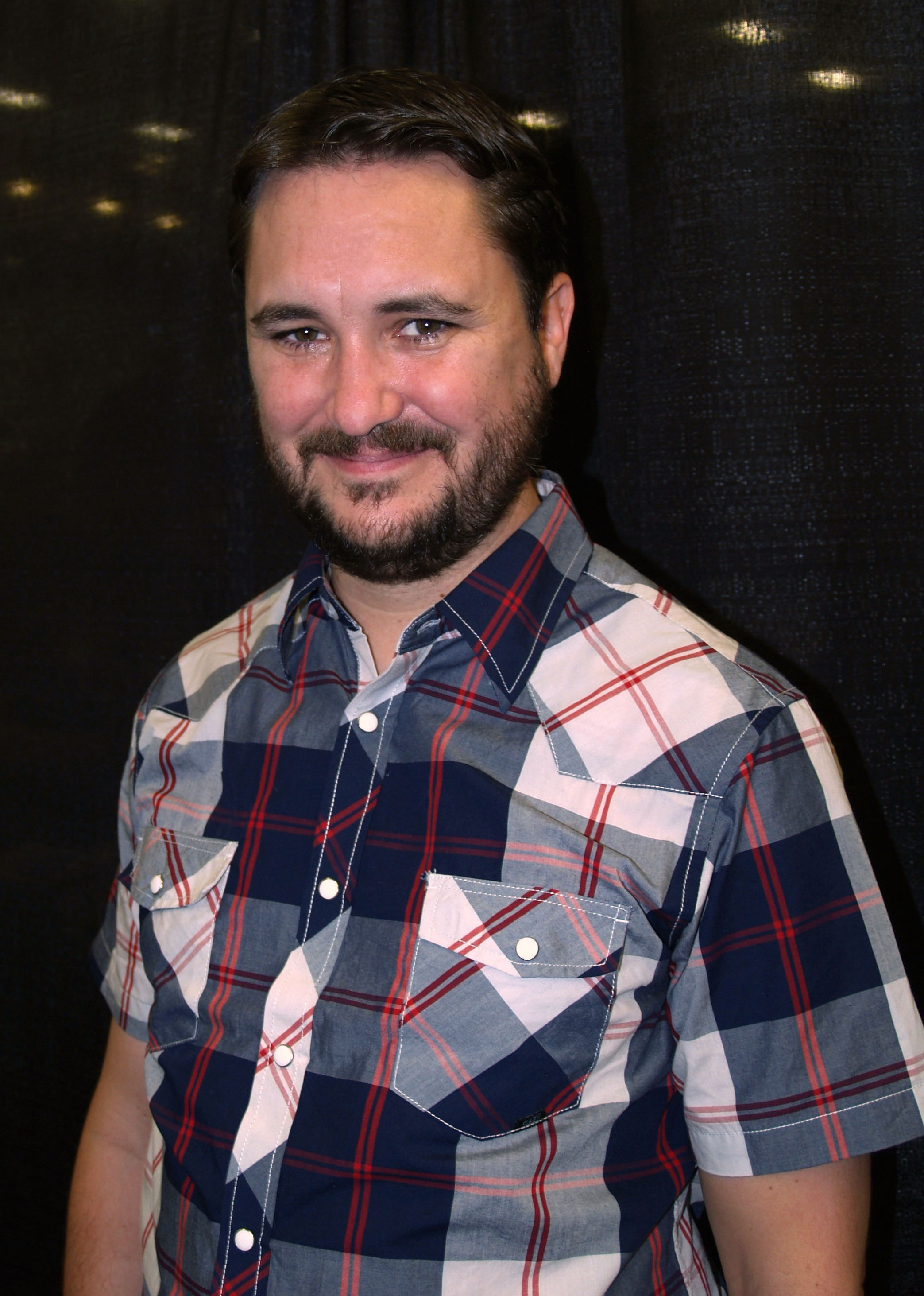
Veteran voice actors John DiMaggio (left) and Wil Wheaton (right) recur in this season as Brother Blood and Aqualad.

The five voice actors for the main characters - Scott Menville, Hynden Walch, Greg Cipes, Tara Strong, and Khary Payton - reprise their roles in the third season as Robin, Starfire, Beast Boy, Raven, and Cyborg, respectively. In addition to their roles as Beast Boy and Starfire, Cipes and Walch voice the characters Adonis and Blackfire in the episodes "The Beast Within" and "Betrothed" respectively. Season three introduces a new main villain, Brother Blood, voiced by John DiMaggio. Dee Bradley Baker returns to the series, providing voices for several characters, including Cinderblock in the episode "Haunted"; Glgrdsklechhh in the episode "Betrothed"; Werebeast, Beast Boy's alter ego, in the episode "The Beast Within"; and Silkie in the episode "Can I Keep Him?". Lauren Tom recurs in the season, voicing Gizmo in two episodes and Jinx in the season premiere "Deception". T'Keyah Crystal Keymáh and Wil Wheaton also recur in the season as Bumblebee and Aqualad respectively.

Season three of Teen Titans featured numerous guest actors providing voices for recurring and guest characters. In the episode "Deception", Kevin Michael Richardson plays the villain Mammoth. James Hong reprises his role as Professor Chang in the episode "X". Alan Shearman provided the voice of Starfire's legal guardian Galfore in the episode "Betrothed". The episode "Haunted" featured the return of veteran voice actor Ron Perlman in his role as Slade. In the episode "Spellbound", Greg Ellis provides the voice of Malchior, Raven's love interest turned villain. The episode "Revolution" features Malcolm McDowell reprising his role as the villain Mad Mod. In the episode "Can I Keep Him?", musician Henry Rollins reprised his role as Johnny Rancid while Canadian actor Marc Worden played the villain Killer Moth, replacing Thomas Haden Church from the previous season. The episode "Bunny Raven... or... How to Make A Titananimal Disappear" features veteran actor Tom Kenny voicing the villain Mumbo. The two part season finale "Titans East" featured Mike Erwin reprising the role of Speedy and Freddy Rodriguez playing Más y Menos.

== Reception ==
The season received generally positive reviews from critics, but has been cited as being inferior to its predecessor. IGN writer Filip Vukcevic gave the season a mixed review, highlighting the season's "insistence on not trying anything new - in terms of storytelling" as a setback: "We really need to be reminded why we should care about these characters, and this team, in fresh, funny ways. Once a show like this has reached its third season it's really got to put in the extra hours; the character-train has got to keep moving forward". Vukcevic also found that the new villain Brother Blood "isn't a particularly interesting or menacing villain". Vukcevic, however, noted the visual gags and the episodes "Revolution" and "Bunny Raven or How to Make a Titananimal Disappear" as highlights of the third season. He ultimately gave the season a 6 out of 10 rating. Mac McEntire of DVD Verdict awarded the third season an 86, praising the writers for exploring the main characters in more depth, particularly with Cyborg and Robin, but was dismissive of the comedic elements featured in the season. John Sinnott, writing for DVD Talk, deemed the third season release as "Highly Recommended". Sinnott noted that the season was not as strong as the previous two, but still "have a lot of action, a good amount of humor, and even a few touching scenes", highlighting the episodes "Haunted" and "Spellbound". In 2004, Matthew Youngberg was nominated at the 32nd Annie Awards for Best Storyboarding in a Television Production for his work on the episode "Haunted".

== Episodes ==
No. overall	No. in season	Title	Directed by	Written by	Original release date	Prod. code	Viewers (millions)
27	1	"Wavelength"	Heather Maxwell	Greg Klein & Thomas Pugsley	October 23, 2004	257–488	N/A
Aqualad appears at the Tower to warn the Titans about Brother Blood's latest weapon – a sonic generator based on Cyborg's blueprints, capable of creating a tidal wave large enough to destroy the city. Blood however is prepared for their arrival and destroys the T-Sub. Meanwhile, another teen hero Bumblebee is playing double agent from within the H.I.V.E. Villain(s): Brother Blood Note: This episode aired as the sixth episode on Kids' WB on October 1, 2005 and re-aired the following week on October 8.
28	2	"Deception"	Michael Chang	Rob Hoegee	August 28, 2004	257–481	0.86
The Titans send Cyborg undercover as Stone to investigate the HIVE's newest plan. Cyborg finds out that a new headmaster, Brother Blood, is now in charge of the academy. The plan becomes compromised as Cyborg grows fond of the popularity he has attained amongst the students and the return to his human self. Villain(s): Brother Blood, Gizmo, Jinx, Mammoth Note: This episode aired on Kids' WB on August 27, 2005 as the first episode.
29	3	"X"	Heather Maxwell	David Slack	September 4, 2004	257–482	N/A
The Titans are faced with a dilemma when Red X returns, causing concern among the team towards Robin. Realizing that the new villain is after xenothium, a dangerous element that powers the suit, the Titans scramble to find Red X. As the Titans close in on Red X, Cyborg, Raven, Beast Boy, and Starfire are captured by Professor Chang, who has his own plans for the xenothium. Villain(s): Professor Chang, Red X Note: This episode aired as the second episode on Kids' WB on September 3, 2005.
30	4	"Betrothed"	Alex Soto	Amy Wolfram	September 11, 2004	257–483	N/A
Starfire is called upon to her home planet of Tamaran to be married to create peace among her planet, only to find Blackfire as the Grand Ruler and her groom to be an unsightly alien from a distant planet. The Titans become suspicious and soon discover that there's more to Blackfire's plan than she let on. Villain(s): Blackfire
31	5	"Crash"	Michael Chang	Rick Copp	September 18, 2004	257–484	1.68
Beast Boy uses Cyborg's circuitry to play a video game but accidentally releases a virus that makes him delusional and hungry. The Titans call upon tech villain Gizmo to destroy the virus affecting Cyborg. Beast Boy, feeling guilty about his mistake, joins Gizmo in destroying the virus core while facing off against the drones and Cyborg's white blood cells while Robin, Raven and Starfire stop Cyborg from eating everything in sight, including the city's communication tower. Villain(s): Virus
32	6	"Haunted"	Heather Maxwell	Adam Beechen	October 2, 2004	257–485	N/A
While the Titans face off against Cinderblock, Robin encounters Slade, who plans to cause an earthquake within the city using seismic generators. The Titans split up to find the generators, only to find nothing. After witnessing Robin fighting himself, the team become concerned that his obsession with Slade has manifested into a poltergeist. Despite capturing him, the Titans soon realize that Slade may be more real than they thought. Villain(s): Cinderblock, Slade Note: This episode aired as the third episode on Kids' WB on September 10, 2005.
33	7	"Spellbound"	Alex Soto	David Slack	October 9, 2004	257–486	N/A
Raven, feeling alone and isolated from the team, bonds with Malchior, a wizard trapped in her book. Wanting to be more powerful, Raven learns spells from the wizard while growing closer to him. When put to the test, the powers become more than she can handle and Raven realizes that Malchior is not who she thought he was. Villain(s): Malchior, Kardiak Note: This episode aired as the fourth episode on Kids' WB on September 17, 2005.
34	8	"Revolution"	Michael Chang	John Esposito	October 16, 2004	257–487	N/A
During the 4th of July celebrations, Mad Mod transforms the city into Britain, steals Robin's youth using his cane, and captures him. After facing off against Mad Mod's minions, the Titans go underground and regroup. Struggling to decide on a plan, each of the Titans carry out their own plan to no avail. Deciding to use all their plans in one attack, the Titans rescue Robin and take down Mad Mod. Villain(s): Mad Mod Note: This episode aired as the fifth episode on Kids' WB on September 24, 2005.
35	9	"Can I Keep Him?"	Christopher Berkeley & Michael Chang	Richard Elliott & Simon Racioppa	November 6, 2004	257–490	1.20
Beast Boy gives Starfire his pet Silkie – one of Killer Moth's silkworms from their last battle – and she begins bonding with it. When Silkie grows too big, Starfire gets rid of him and inadvertently sends him back to Killer Moth. Villain(s): Johnny Rancid, Killer Moth Note: This episode aired as the seventh episode on Kids' WB on October 15, 2005 and re-aired the following week on October 22.
36	10	"Bunny Raven... or... How to Make a Titananimal Disappear"	Heather Maxwell	Louis Hirshorn & Joelle Sellner	January 8, 2005	257–491	N/A
The Titans are drawn into Mumbo's magic hat and turned into various animals, with the exception of Beast Boy who is given the ability to transform into inanimate objects. Villain(s): Mumbo Note: This episode aired on October 29, 2005 on Kids' WB as the eighth episode and re-aired the following week on November 5.
37	11	"The Beast Within"	Alex Soto	David Slack	October 30, 2004	257–489	N/A
Following a battle with Adonis that accidentally ends with a bath in chemicals, Beast Boy begins exhibiting aggressive behavior, much to the other Titans' concern. Their worries grow when Beast Boy transforms into a savage werewolf-like beast and he and Raven go M.I.A. and are found with Raven hanging from Beast Boy's mouth. Villain(s): Adonis Note: This episode aired on Kids' WB as the eleventh and final episode on December 17, 2005.
38	12	"Titans East"	Alex Soto	Marv Wolfman	January 15, 2005	257–492	N/A
39	13	"Titans East"	Michael Chang	David Slack	January 22, 2005	257–493	2.14
Part 1: A new branch of the Titans is founded to help track down Brother Blood. Bearing the name Titans East, it consists of Bumblebee, Speedy, Aqualad, and the super fast Guatemalan twins Más y Menos. Cyborg goes to assist in building the Titans East Tower when Brother Blood suddenly shows up. A large battle ensues with an army of robots based on Cyborg's specs, which stuns Cyborg himself. Villain(s): Brother Blood, Steamroller; Note: The first part of the episode aired on November 12, 2005 as the ninth episode on Kids' WB and re-aired on the following next two weeks on November 19 and November 26. Part 2: Brother Blood takes control of the Titans East tower with the team under his mind control. Using Cyborg's technology against him, Brother Blood plans to turn the team into cyborgs as he has done to himself. Cyborg calls on the Titans to help him out. Villain(s): Brother Blood, Professor Chang, Aqualad, Bumblebee, Speedy, Más y Menos (all five under Brother Blood's mind control); Note: The second part of the episode aired on Kids' WB as the tenth episode on December 3, 2005 and re-aired the following week on December 10.

== DVD release ==
The DVD boxset was released on April 10, 2007 in the United States and Canada. It features a series title "Teen Titans: Know Your Foes", featurette which is segmented for each of the series main villains.

Teen Titans - The Complete Third Season
Set details	Special features
13 episodes; 2-disc set (DVD); 1.33:1 aspect ratio; Subtitles: Portuguese; Language: English (Stereo)	Featurettes; "Teen Titans: Know Your Foes"; Easter Eggs
DVD release date
United States	Canada
April 10, 2007
