= Teen Titans season 2 =

Season of television series

Teen Titans
- Season 2
- Digital cover art
- Showrunner: Glen Murakami
- Starring: Greg Cipes; Scott Menville; Khary Payton; Tara Strong; Hynden Walch; Ashley Johnson
- No. of episodes: 13

Release
- Original network: Cartoon Network
- Original release: January 10 – August 21, 2004

Season chronology
- ← Previous; Season 1 Next → Season 3

The second season of the animated television series Teen Titans, based on the DC comics series of the same time by Bob Haney and Bruno Premiani, originally aired on Cartoon Network in the United States. Developed by Glen Murakami, Sam Register, and television writer David Slack, the series was produced by DC Entertainment and Warner Bros. Animation. The series focuses on a team of crime-fighting teenaged superheroes, consisting of the leader Robin, foreign alien princess Starfire, green shapeshifter Beast Boy, the dark sorceress Raven, and the technological genius Cyborg. The season focuses on a new character, Terra, a hero possessing the ability to move the earth while struggling to accept her boundaries and the Titans as her friends, with Slade's looming presence in her life making it all the more difficult.

The season premiered on January 10, 2004 and ran until August 21, broadcasting 13 episodes. The season also aired on Kids' WB on later dates. The season re-aired on Kids' WB during the 2007–08 U.S. network television season on The CW for the final time, but instead airing episodes out of order.

Warner Bros. Home Video released the second season on DVD in the United States on September 12, 2006 and in Canada on September 26. Upon release of the season on DVD, the season received critical acclaim with the Terra story arc being singled out for praise.

== Production ==
Season two of Teen Titans aired on Cartoon Network Saturday nights at 9:00 P.M., from January 10 to August 21, 2004. During its broadcast, the series shifted from programming blocks Toonami to Miguzi, beginning on April 17. The season was produced by DC Entertainment and Warner Bros. Animation, executive produced by Sander Schwartz and produced by Glen Murakami, Bruce Timm and Linda M. Steiner. Staff directors for the series included Michael Chang, Ciro Nieli, and Alex Soto. The episodes for the season were written by a team of writers, which included Adam Beechen, Rick Copp, Rob Hoegee, Dwayne McDuffie, David Slack, and Amy Wolfram. Murakami worked with Derrick Wyatt, Brianne Drouhard, and Jon Suzuki on character design while Hakjoon Kang was the background designer for the series.

== Cast and characters ==
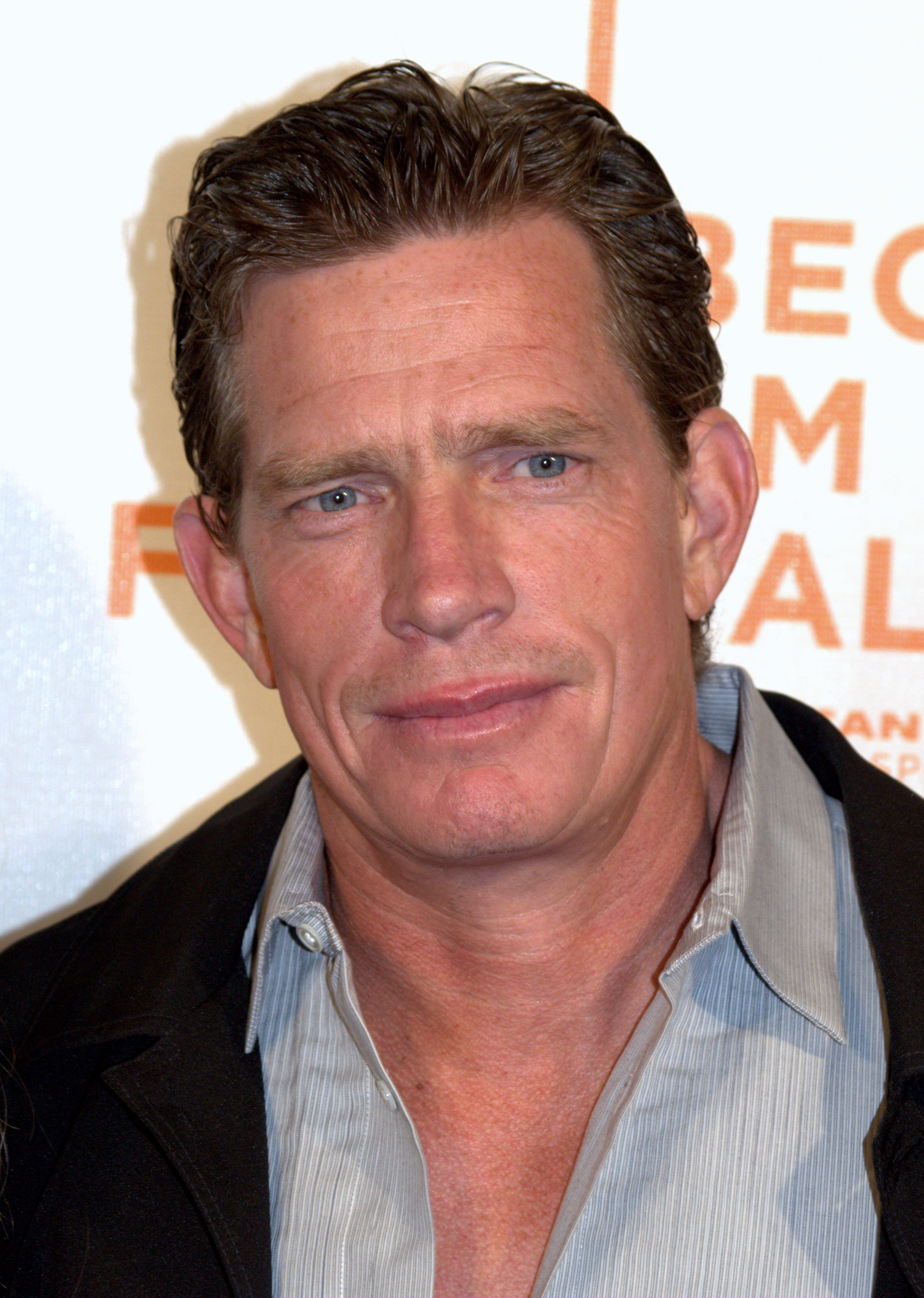
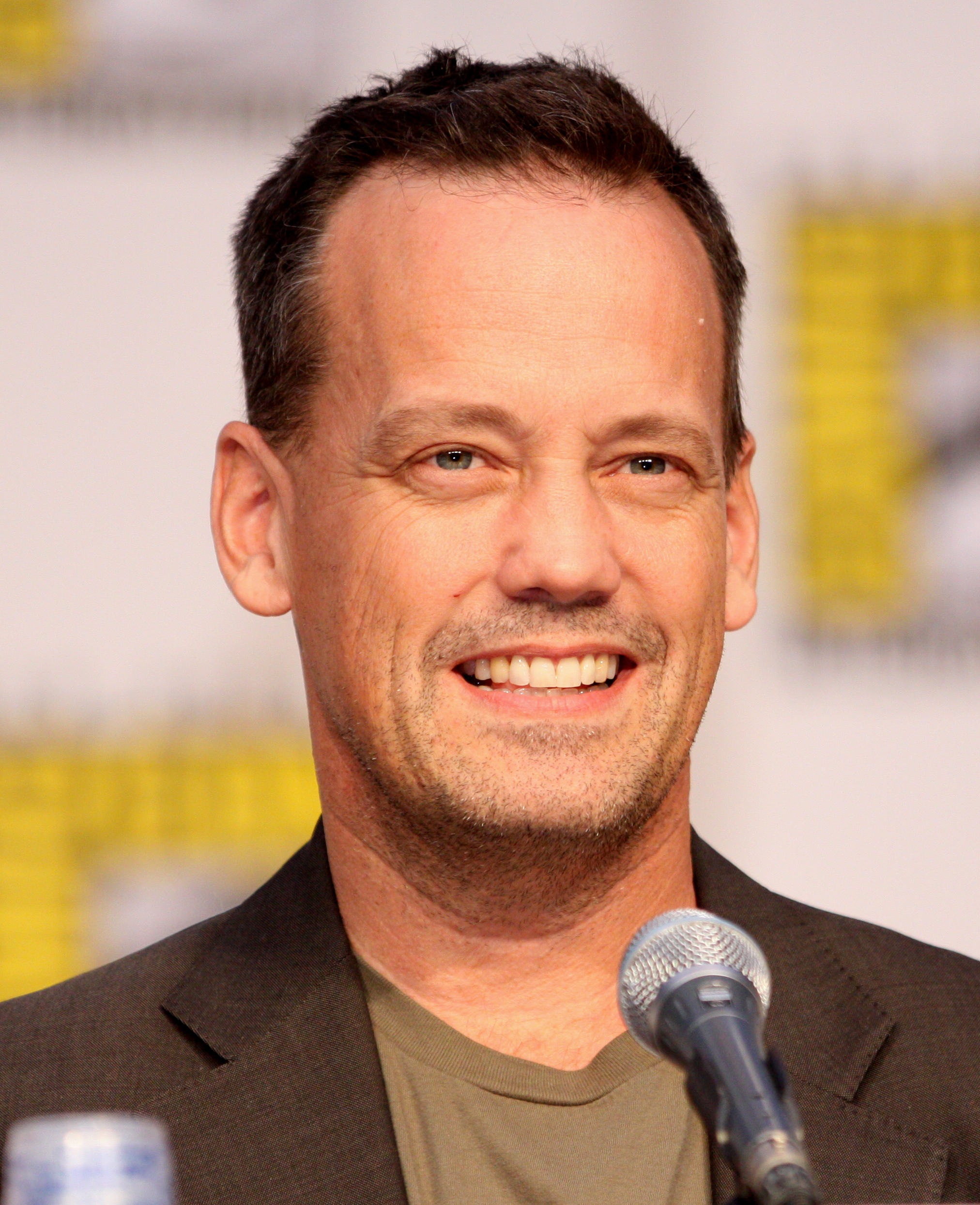
The second season featured vocal talents from a variety of veteran film, television and voice actors, including Thomas Haden Church (left). The season also featured voice actor Dee Bradley Baker (right) providing a voice for several characters.

Scott Menville, Hynden Walch, Greg Cipes, Tara Strong, and Khary Payton reprise their roles in the second season as their respective Teen Titans - Robin, Starfire, Beast Boy, Raven, and Cyborg. In addition to her role as Raven, Strong voices the character Kitten, the daughter of Killer Moth, in the episode "Date with Destiny". Season two also debuts Terra, a young teenage girl with the ability to move the earth around her, and who later develops a relationship with Beast Boy in her second stint with the team, with actress Ashley Johnson providing her voice. Ron Perlman reprises his role as the Titans' main villain Slade, in four episodes of the season. Dee Bradley Baker returns to the series, providing voices for several characters, including the Alien Dog and villain Soto in "Every Dog Has His Day"; Plasmus in two episodes; Overload in part one of the season finale; and Larry, Robin's double from another dimension, in the episode "Fractured". Wil Wheaton returns to his role of Aqualad in the episode "Winner Take All".

Season two of Teen Titans featured numerous guest actors providing voices for recurring and guest characters. In the episode "How Long is Forever?", Xander Berkeley plays the villain Warp. Keith David and actor and comedian John DiMaggio provided the voices of Atlas and Spike in "Only Human". In the episode "Fear Itself", veteran voice actress Tress MacNeille and actor Alexander Polinsky provide the voices of Horror Movie Actress and the villain Control Freak, respectively. Film actor Thomas Haden Church provided the voice of Killer Moth, a villain who breeds an insect army, in the episode "Date with Destiny". Will Friedle also voices the characters Fang and a frozen promgoer in the episode. The episode "Transformation" features narration by British actor Tony Jay (voice of Claude Frollo and Shere Khan) and voice acting from Cathy Cavadini as the Cironielian Chrysalis Eater. In the episode "Winner Take All", Mike Erwin provided the voice of Speedy while Jim Cummings (voices of Winnie the Pooh, Tigger, Pete and Darkwing Duck) provided the voices of the Master of Games, the episode's main villain, and Wildebeest. Musician Henry Rollins voiced the character Johnny Rancid in the episode "Fractured".

== Reception ==
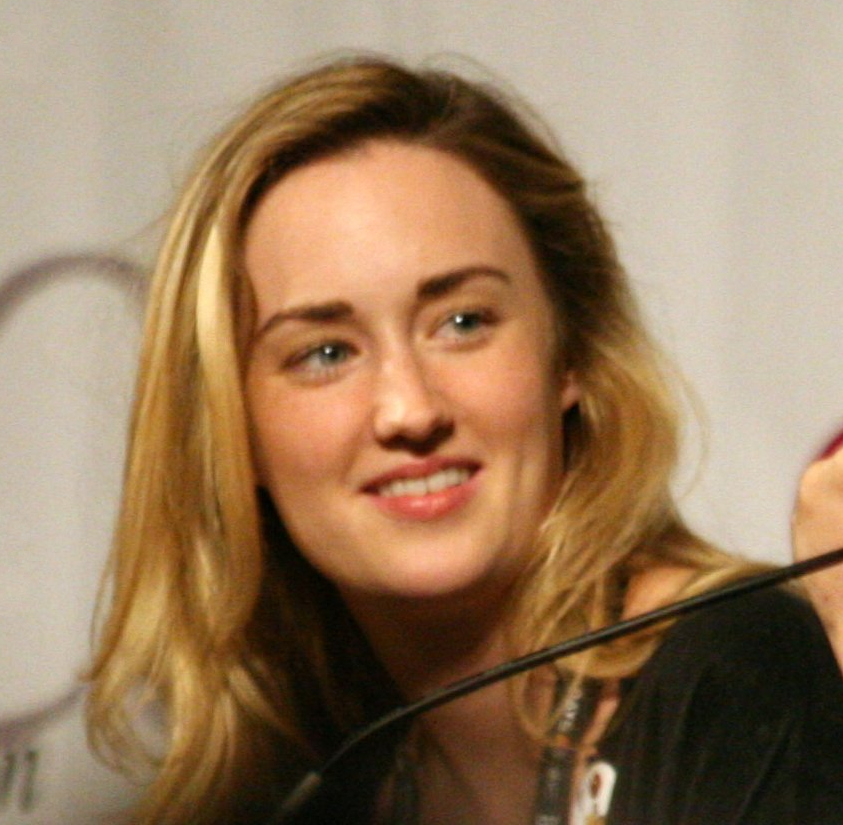
Critics praised the story arc centered on new character Terra (voiced by Ashley Johnson (pictured)).

The season received critical acclaim, with the Terra story arc being singled out for praise. Writing for IGN, Filip Vuckevic gave the series an 8 out of 10, calling it fresh and fun. Vuckevic praised the season's visual, highlighting the episode "Fractured" as an example, and the story arc focused on Terra. John Sinnott of DVD Talk deemed the second season release as "Highly Recommended", writing that "these shows are just as entertaining as the first season episodes were. They are action filled, but the characters have real personalities. There is a good amount of humor and the occasional touching scene that works well". Sinnott highlighted episodes "How Long is Forever", "Fear Itself", and "Fractured" as his favorites while "Only Human" was his least favorite. Sinnott praised the episodes centered on Terra as "a pretty good adaptation of a great comic story". Mac McEntire of DVD Verdict praised the Terra story arc as "expertly played" and further commended the series' more dramatic moments, including the mud fight between Terra and Raven, Beast Boy's late-night date with Terra and Robin's last-ditch effort to sway her for good, but remained critical of the comedic aspect of the series, noting that the "two key elements of the series—the action and the comedy—were often at odds with each other". He also criticized the lack of back story for the main characters.

== Episodes ==
No. overall	No. in season	Title	Directed by	Written by	Original release date	Prod. code
14	1	"How Long Is Forever?"	Alex Soto	David Slack	January 10, 2004	257-321
Starfire is trying to commemorate the Tamaranean holiday Blorthog, a festival of friendship, but is disheartened at the team's constant bickering instead of listening to her. When Warp, a villain from the future, comes back in time to steal an antique, Starfire follows as he jumps through time. She arrives twenty years into the future and finds that the team has disbanded since her disappearance; they are each now alone and unhappy. The adult Titans rally together to defeat Warp and help Starfire return to her time. Upon her return, the Titans become determined to change their future fate and celebrate Blorthog with her. Villain(s): Warp
15	2	"Every Dog Has His Day"	Michael Chang	Rob Hoegee	January 17, 2004	257-322
A lonely Beast Boy goes into the city as a green dog when the rest of the team is too busy for him. He gets captured by the alien Soto, who believes him to be his original dog. The other Titans notice Beast Boy has gone missing and end up chasing Soto's dog, believing it is their teammate. Villain(s): Soto
16	3	"Terra"	Ciro Nieli	Amy Wolfram	January 24, 2004	257-323
The Titans meet Terra, a girl with the elemental ability to manipulate the earth around her. Though a seemingly great addition to the team, she confides in Beast Boy that she has trouble controlling her powers, and Robin feels off about her. Terra is confronted by Slade, who tells her he will be a better mentor than the Titans. When the Titans mention that they have noticed her struggle with her powers, Terra leaves them, assuming Beast Boy exposed her. Villain(s): Slade, Giant Scorpion
17	4	"Only Human"	Alex Soto	Adam Beechen	January 31, 2004	257-324
When Cyborg beats Atlas, a robot, in an online video game, he challenges Cyborg to a real, physical fight. Due to the limits on his strength, Cyborg loses. Atlas kidnaps the rest of the Titans as his prize and challenges Cyborg to a rematch where his friends are at stake. Cyborg eventually surpasses his own limits and beats Atlas. Villain(s): Atlas
18	5	"Fear Itself"	Michael Chang	Dwayne McDuffie	February 7, 2004	257-325
After defeating Control Freak, the Titans watch a horror movie at home. The movie tends to frighten all of them but Raven insists she does not get scared. They are later awakened in the night to find the Tower under siege by monsters from the movie while Raven inexplicably loses her powers, because she has unknowingly brought the monsters to life. One by one, they are taken out until Raven is left. Despite repeatedly denying her fear, she realizes she truly is scared and rises to fight back, regaining her powers and defeating the monsters. She awakens to find the Titans safe and learns that she caused the monsters to appear due to repressing her fear. Villain(s): Control Freak, and Monsters (subconsciously, the monsters only being embodiments of Raven's suppressed fright)
19	6	"Date with Destiny"	Ciro Nieli	Rick Copp	February 14, 2004	257-326
A villain named Killer Moth breeds an army of insects and unleashes them on the town, but he promises not to destroy the city if Robin takes his daughter Kitten to her junior prom. Cyborg, Raven and Beast Boy scope out Killer Moth's lair, while a jealous Starfire attends the prom to stay close to Robin. Note: This episode aired before "Transformation", but Starfire still shoots green ultraviolet energy from her eyes. This is likely due to this episode being completed sooner or her heightened jealousy pushing her temper and boosting her abilities. Villain(s): Killer Moth, Kitten, Fang
20	7	"Transformation"	Alex Soto	Rob Hoegee	February 21, 2004	257-327
Starfire starts undergoing strange physical changes such as hairy feet and scale-like skin. Believing she is turning into a monster, she flees, fearing rejection from her friends, and takes refuge on another planet. She meets a kind alien who explains that she is merely going through puberty as a Tamaranean and will become encased in a chrysalis. The alien turns out to be a Cironielian Chrysalis Eater. The Titans rescue Starfire, who emerges from the chrysalis as her normal self albeit with a new ability. Note: Here, Starfire develops the ability to emit bright green ultraviolet energy from her eyes as her elder sister can, though her eye beams are much thicker. Villain(s): Plasmus, Cironielian Chrysalis Eater
21	8	"Titan Rising"	Michael Chang	Amy Wolfram	February 28, 2004	257-328
Terra returns and says she is ready to join the Teen Titans, having mastered her powers while she has been away. The others aren't so sure, with Raven being the most suspicious and distrustful of her; regardless, they decide to let her prove herself. Slade attacks the Titans Tower with wormlike robots. Initially struggling to get along with one another, Terra and Raven work together to save the Tower; as a result, the Titans accept her into the team, as she has earned their trust. However, when the Titans leave Terra; she makes an ambiguous comment she can not believe they trust her. Villain(s): Slade
22	9	"Winner Take All"	Ciro Nieli	Dwayne McDuffie	March 6, 2004	257-329
Robin, Beast Boy, and Cyborg are summoned by the Master of Games to compete in a "Tournament of Champions" against other superheroes such as Speedy and Aqualad. Cyborg becomes suspicious when the losing contestants vanish. Robin wins the tournament but discovers that the Master of Games is absorbing everyone's powers; he then fights the Master and frees his friends. Villain(s): Master of Games
23	10	"Betrayal"	Alex Soto	Amy Wolfram	July 31, 2004	257-330
Terra and Beast Boy go out on a date while the tower is under siege by Slade's minions. Slade then shows Beast Boy where Terra's loyalties lie, Terra reveals to Beast Boy she controlled her powers due to Slade and the reason she came back to the Titans is to betray and destroy them to help Slade, leaving Beast Boy and the Titans feeling betrayed. Villain(s): Slade
24	11	"Fractured"	Michael Chang	David Slack	August 7, 2004	257-331
Robin is bothered by Larry, his double from a different dimension, who appears after Robin breaks his arm. Robin accidentally breaks Larry's magical finger, causing reality to become distorted. Villain Johnny Rancid takes advantage of the chaos and transforms into a darker version of himself. Villain(s): Johnny Rancid
25	12	"Aftershock"	Ciro Nieli	David Slack	August 14, 2004	257-332
26	13	"Aftershock"	Alex Soto	Amy Wolfram	August 21, 2004	257-333
Part 1: Slade sends a newly-transformed Terra to attack the Teen Titans. Unable to defeat her, the Titans retreat and regroup, planning to break Slade's grip on Terra. Terra frees Cinderblock, Overload and Plasmus from prison and, through Slade, disperses them throughout the city to take down the Titans. This turns out to be a decoy to bring the Titans out of hiding and destroy them one by one, after trying to talk to Terra only for her to attempt to kill them; the Titans accepts Terra as an enemy and will not hesitate to severely hurting her. Part 2: With the Titans seemingly gone, Slade has taken control of the city, but the Titans don't go down so easily. They unleash payback on Terra for betraying them to join Slade and for trying to kill them, which leaves her feeling broken inside more than ever before and horrified to realize her actions against them has become fatal. Terra returns to Slade who soon reveals he only wanted to use her and she is nothing more than a disposable pawn. Regretting every action since her betrayal and falling for Slade's manipulation, she begs Beast Boy to finish her off, but Beast Boy refuses, saying only she can control her destiny. Terra turns on Slade, killing him by submerging him in lava, but her powers trigger a volcanic eruption that threatens to destroy Jump City. Terra sacrifices herself to stop the eruption, turning herself into stone. With the city saved, the Titans put up a memorial next to her body in her honor, hoping to find a way to bring her back. Villain(s): Mumbo (in a flashback), Cinderblock, Ternion, Overload, Plasmus, Slade, Terra

== DVD release ==
Teen Titans - The Complete Second Season
Set details	Special features
13 episodes; 2-disc set (DVD); 1.33:1 aspect ratio; Subtitles: English, French, Spanish; English, French, Spanish: Dolby Digital 2.0 Stereo	Featurettes; "Catching Up with… Teen Titans: Inside Season 2"
DVD release date
United States	Canada
September 12, 2006	September 26, 2006
