= Teen Titans season 1 =

Teen Titans
- Season 1
- Digital cover art
- Showrunner: Glen Murakami
- Starring: Greg Cipes; Scott Menville; Khary Payton; Tara Strong; Hynden Walch
- No. of episodes: 13

Release
- Original network: Cartoon Network
- Original release: July 19 – November 11, 2003

Season chronology
- Next → Season 2

The first season of the animated television series Teen Titans, based on the DC Comics series created by Bob Haney and Bruno Premiani, originally aired on Cartoon Network in the United States. Developed by Glen Murakami, Sam Register, and television writer David Slack, the series was produced by DC Entertainment and Warner Bros. Animation. It stars Scott Menville, Hynden Walch, Khary Payton, Tara Strong, and Greg Cipes as the voices of the main characters.

The series revolves around a team of crime-fighting teenaged superheroes — Robin, the team's fearless leader; Starfire, an alien princess from Tamaran; Cyborg, the team's tech-wizard who is half human and half robot; Raven, a telepathic sorceress from Azarath; and Beast Boy, a shapeshifter who can transform into any and all types of animals. The show focuses on the Titans adventures in protecting the city. The first season also features an overarching storyline focused on the Titans' main villain Slade, a mysterious mastermind who takes an interest in Robin and also the latter's growing obsession towards stopping him at any cost.

Teen Titans debuted on Cartoon Network on July 19, 2003 and concluded its first season on November 11. The season also aired on Kids' WB programming block from November 1, 2003 to February 28, 2004. The season premiered to strong ratings for Cartoon Network while displaying a moderate showing on Kids' WB; the series became Cartoon Network's highest rated new series at the time. While initial reaction to the series was mixed to negative, the season as a whole received positive reviews with many critics highlighting the series' storytelling and dialogue.

== Production ==
The first season of Teen Titans aired on Cartoon Network. The season aired on Kids' WB Saturday mornings at 8:30 A.M. EST, beginning on November 1, 2003. The series was first greenlit in late September 2002, with American animator Glen Murakami signed on. The series' creation was inspired by the success of Justice League, also based on DC Comics characters, but in contrast to Justice League and other DC animated television series, the intention behind Teen Titans was to create the series for a younger audience. Series producer and animator Glen Murakami noted that the series is "lighter and has humor" while staying true to the "intent of the characters". Murakami also noted that the process of transforming material from the comics into material suitable for the target audience was similar to what was done with both Batman: The Animated Series and Batman Beyond: "We kind of have to take into consideration that were not making this cartoon just for fans of the comic book, the ones who know all the backstory and know all the continuity. We have to tell the Starfire story in half an hour! I think we took all those things into consideration, but there's just some things you can't do for children's programming". The series' mixes American style animation with Japanese anime. According to Murakami, the incorporating of anime came naturally, noting that he and Bruce Timm were anime fans and the increased presence of anime at the time.

== Cast and characters ==
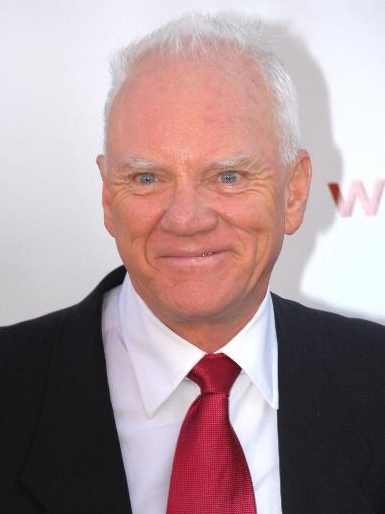
The first season featured the voice talent of veteran British voice actor Malcolm McDowell. He voiced villain Mad Mod in the episode bearing his character's name.

The first season employs a cast of five main voice actors. Scott Menville provided the voice of Robin, the Titans' leader and martial arts expert. Greg Cipes voiced Beast Boy, a green-skinned shapeshifter who can change into any animal. Cyborg, the half-robot half-human technological genius of the Titans, was portrayed by Khary Payton. Tara Strong played Raven, a sorceress from Azarath whose powers are triggered and controlled by her emotions. Starfire, a Tamaranian princess who still struggles to acclimate to Earth customs, was voiced by Hynden Walch. Walch also provided the voice for Blackfire, Starfire's older sister, in the episode "Sisters" while Menville played Robin's alter-ego Red X in the episode "Masks".

In addition to the main cast, the season also employs several guest voice actors. Actor Dee Bradley Baker provided the voice effects for Cinderblock, a humanoid concrete monster, appearing in two episodes of the season. Baker also provided the voice of Plasmus in the episode "Divide and Conquer". The episode "Sisters" featured the voices of David Sobolov and Rino Romano respectively as Cron and Kai, members of the Centauri police who came to Earth to capture Blackfire. Veteran actor Ron Perlman played Slade, the season's main villain, appearing in six episodes. The episode "Final Exam" featured the vocal talents of Lauren Tom, who voiced H.I.V.E. members Jinx and Gizmo, and Kevin Michael Richardson, who provided the voice of Mammoth. Tom also voiced Gizmo in the episode "Car Trouble". In the episode "Forces of Nature", Stuart Scott Bullock, better known as S. Scott Bullock, provided the voice of Thunder and Quinton Flynn provided the voice for Lightning. Thunder and Lightning are supernatural brothers who use their powers to cause mischief and they would later become allies of the Titans in Season 5. In the episode "The Sum of His Parts", Tom Kenny, the voice of SpongeBob SquarePants in the Nickelodeon series of the same name, provided the voices of Mumbo and robot hermit Fixit, the episode's main villains. Recurring villain Dr. Light, voiced by character actor Rodger Bumpass (the voice of Squidward Tentacles) debuted in the episode "Nevermore". Keith Szarabajka filled the voice of Trigon, who later returns in Season 4 as the season's main villain, important to that season's story arc. Tracey Walter lent his voice to the main villain of the episode "Switched", Puppet King. The episode "Deep Six" featured the vocal talents of Clancy Brown (voice of Mr. Krabs) who portrayed the villain Trident, and veteran actor and comedian Dave Coulier (who played Tramm and Captain), and actor and writer Wil Wheaton (who voiced fellow hero Aqualad). The episode "Mad Mod" featured English actor Malcolm McDowell providing the voice of the titular character. Matt Levin and James Arnold Taylor provided voices for Cash and Sammy respectively in the episode "Car Trouble". Taylor also provided the voice of the episode's villain Overload.

== Reception and release ==
Teen Titans debuted on Cartoon Network on July 19, 2003 with the highest ratings among boy 6–11 for the network. Ratings for the following two episodes showed growth across the target demographics, including a 78 percent rise in viewers age 6–11 and an 87% rise in boy viewers age 6–11. Season one completed its run on the network as the network's most successful new series, averaging 635,000 viewers among the kids 6–11 demographic (2.7 rating) and 1.021 million viewers in the kids 2–11 demographic (2.6 rating). The success of the series on the channel prompted Cartoon Network to order 52 more episodes of the series. The series debuted on Kids' WB with a moderate standing among kids 6–11 with a 3.5%/17 rating. The series ranked among the top ten programs in the target demographics, including kids 2–11, kids 6–11 and tweens 9–14.

Initial reviews of the series were negative. KJB of IGN gave the series a 4 out of 10 rating, writing that the series "fails to live up to the source material or its potential. The series is bogged down by an overly cartoony style that looks more like anime without most of the good points". KJB further added: "Teen Titans, from its after school special style attempts at storytelling to its painfully annoying signature tune, fails to meet even the lowest of expectations for this series". Los Angeles Daily News writer David Kronke offered a more mixed review, finding the dialogue "occasionally witty", but ultimately dismissing the characters "too bratty to have any interest in saving the world or even in cleaning it up a little". Ethan Alter of Media Life Magazine also wrote a mixed review of the first two episodes. Alter praised the animation and action scenes, noting that the animation possess "a grace and fluidity" not seen on cable cartoon shows. His main criticism, however, was towards the writing, noting that the stories have been "told a thousand times before in previous superhero cartoons".

Despite initial reviews, the full season reviews were more positive. Filip Vukcevic of IGN awarded the season an 8 out of 10 score, writing: "It's clear that Teen Titans is primarily aimed at children, so you're obviously not going to have anything too mature here. However, what you do get is some very focused, funny, and entertaining storytelling from a group of characters that, when they're gone, you'll actually miss". Writing for DVD Verdict, Mike Jackson gave the first season a mixed review. Jackson found the violence and demonic imagery troubling, saying that he would not let his son watch the show, but praised the voice cast, particularly Ron Perlman, who voiced Slade. David Cornelius of DVD Talk classified the first season release as "Highly Recommended", except for those with the first two volumes. Cornelius commented that "Teen Titans goes big and broad and bold, to heck with the subtleties, and it actually works. The writers know how to balance the swift action with the crisp dialogue (Starfire's constant comic mishandling of the language has yet to grow stale), and the stories, while zany and far-fetched, become involving enough to capture the hearts of all ages".

== Episodes ==
No. overall	No. in season	Title	Directed by	Written by	Original release date	Prod. code
1	1	"Final Exam"	Michael Chang	Rob Hoegee	July 19, 2003	385-903
Slade, a mysterious villain, enlists a trio of H.I.V.E. Academy cadets to destroy the Titans. The H.I.V.E. win the initial battle, knocking Robin into a sewer, and later manage to take over Titans Tower. With the Titans now exiled from their home, Robin returns with a plan, and the Titans go on to defeat the H.I.V.E.. Robin learns of the existence of Slade and Slade is pleased that his "message" has been received. Villain(s): Jinx, Gizmo, Mammoth, Slade
2	2	"Sisters"	Alex Soto	Amy Wolfram	July 26, 2003	385-902
Blackfire, Starfire's older sister, comes for a visit and quickly ingratiates herself among the Titans. Feeling left out, Starfire decides to leave the Titans before being kidnapped by drones sent from Centauri to arrest Blackfire for stealing. Discovering that her sister tried to have her take the blame, Starfire tracks down Blackfire and has her arrested by the Centauri police. Villain(s): Blackfire
3	3	"Divide and Conquer"	Ciro Nieli	David Slack	August 2, 2003	385-901
Cinderblock breaks into a prison but is beaten there by the Titans, but a misstep in the "sonic boom" attack knocks the Titans out and allows for Cinderblock to escape and take a quarantined Plasmus with him. Robin and Cyborg argue about who messed up, causing Cyborg to quit. Slade unleashes Plasmus on the remaining four Titans. Cyborg later returns and assists the Titans in defeating Plasmus and Cinderblock. Villain(s): Slade, Cinderblock, Plasmus
4	4	"Forces of Nature"	Ciro Nieli	Adam Beechen	August 16, 2003	385-904
Beast Boy tries to prank Cyborg, but Starfire is accidentally targeted. She stops talking to him as a result. The Titans deal with a pair of brothers known as Thunder and Lightning, whose version of having fun is causing chaos in the city. The duo is approached by a mystic sage, who teaches them how to amplify their powers using an assortment of twigs and leaves. The sage, however, uses magic to animate the burning sticks as a monster. The Titans fight the monster off before it reaches town. Beast Boy attempts to break through to Thunder while Robin faces off against the sage, who turns out to be Slade. Villain(s): Thunder and Lightning, Slade
5	5	"The Sum of His Parts"	Alex Soto	David Slack	August 23, 2003	385-905
While playing football in the park, Cyborg suddenly shuts down. He reboots but his batteries are dying and require recharging. He doesn't get the chance because the nefarious Mumbo is causing havoc in Jump City. While facing him, Cyborg's emergency batteries fall off, and his inert body falls into the underground depths of a junkyard. The Titans believe Mumbo has kidnapped him, but he has instead been found by a strange machine called Fixit, who doesn't share Cyborg's views of humanity. Instead, he believes it to be a flawed part of Cyborg's biology – one that he intends to correct, with or without Cyborg's consent. Villain(s): Mumbo, Fixit
6	6	"Nevermore"	Michael Chang	Greg Klein & Tom Pugsley	August 30, 2003	385-906
During a battle with Dr. Light, Raven loses control of her powers, which worries the Titans. In her room, Beast Boy discovers a strange handmirror, which sucks him and Cyborg into a dark realm. They meet various Emoticlones, personified versions of the different emotions and personality traits of Raven. They've actually stumbled into Raven's mind, which causes an adverse effect on her in the real world. She angrily tries to get them out; her anger appears in the form of her demon father, Trigon. The boys refuse to leave without helping her; with their encouragement, Raven fuses with her other Emoticlones to defeat Trigon. The ordeal brings the three closer and she acknowledges Beast Boy as a friend. Villain(s): Dr. Light, Trigon
7	7	"Switched"	Ciro Nieli	Rick Copp	September 6, 2003	385-907
The Puppet King uses puppets modeled after the Titans to trap the souls of Robin, Cyborg, and Beast Boy, and takes control of their now-soulless bodies. Raven uses her powers to stop him from doing the same to the girls, accidentally causing her and Starfire's souls to switch into each other's bodies. The girls resolve to get to know each other more so they can learn how to use the other's powers. They eventually manage to work together and stop the Puppet King, returning all the souls to their respective bodies. This ordeal brings Raven and Starfire closer, and the two begin to spend more time together. Villain(s): Puppet King, Cyborg, Beast Boy, and Robin (under Puppet King's control)
8	8	"Deep Six"	Alex Soto	Marv Wolfman	September 13, 2003	385-908
A mysterious oceanic villain called Trident appears and starts stealing nuclear waste from ships. On their underwater mission to stop him, The Titans meet Aqualad, an aquatic hero who knows more about Trident than they do. They team up with him to stop Trident, though Beast Boy quarrels with Aqualad over who is better. They discover that Trident is more than one person; he is building a colony of Tridents. Playing on Trident's ego, Beast Boy gets all the Tridents to argue with each other over who the original best one is. The Titans then trap the clones in a cave, and Aqualad and Beast Boy make up. Villain(s): Trident
9	9	"Masks"	Michael Chang	Greg Klein & Tom Pugsley	September 20, 2003	385-909
While Robin is following a lead on Slade, the Titans battle a new villain, Red X. Red X tries forming a partnership with Slade, but is given tasks to prove himself first. The Titans are shocked discover that Red X is actually Robin himself. He was masquerading to learn Slade's plans but Slade knew it was him the whole time. He taunts Robin about their similarities and Robin learns that he is just fighting a robot; the real Slade is still hidden. Robin tells Starfire that he didn't tell the Titans his plan because he had to get Slade to fall for the ruse. Starfire declares that he and Slade do share one thing in common – Slade did not trust Robin and Robin did not trust his friends. Villain(s): Slade, Red X
10	10	"Mad Mod"	Ciro Nieli	Adam Beechen	September 27, 2003	385-910
Mysteriously knocked out cold, the Titans wake to find themselves in the hands of Mad Mod, a British villain disgruntled by their interference in other villains' business. Separated from each other, they make their way back to each other while dealing with robots and optical illusions. Robin realizes Mad Mod himself is an illusion and acts upon a different approach; he shuts down the illusions by finding the wires and reaches the operation center, where he apprehends the real Mad Mod, who is actually an old man. Villain(s): Mad Mod
11	11	"Apprentice"	Michael Chang	Rob Hoegee	October 4, 2003	385-912
12	12	"Apprentice"	Ciro Nieli	David Slack	October 11, 2003	385-913
Part 1: Slade threatens to stop time in Jump City with a Chronoton Detonator. While searching for the device, Robin, on edge, attacks everything in sight, causing the Titans to intervene. He is separated from the team by Cinderblock and finds Slade's tracking device, using it to reach his headquarters and confront him in person for the first time. The rest of the Titans find that the detonator is fake. They are then blasted by a gun, which, unbeknownst to them, infects them with lethal nanoscopic probes, giving Slade the ability to kill them if Robin does not do as he says. Wanting to keep his friends safe, Robin becomes Slade's apprentice. Part 2: Blackmailed by Slade, Robin is forced to become the Titans' enemy, though he hesitates in truly hurting them, causing Slade to activate the probes. Catching on to the ruse, the Titans burst into Slade's headquarters. When Slade activates the probes again, Robin willingly infects himself with them, choosing to suffer with his friends rather than be his apprentice. Refusing to lose Robin, Slade destroys the device, and the Titans defeat him. Slade escapes as the building self-destructs but Cyborg manages to retrieve the probe machine. Back home, he is able to use it to remove the probes from the Titans. Villain(s): Slade, Cinderblock, Robin
13	13	"Car Trouble"	Alex Soto	Amy Wolfram	November 11, 2003	385-911
Cyborg goes on a chase for his newly finished T-Car after it is stolen by thugs Cash and Sammy. Gizmo steals it from them in turn and Raven helps Cyborg track him down. The T-car crashes into a prison transport vehicle that is carrying the villain Overload. Overload takes over the T-car, forcing Cyborg to destroy it to defeat him. Raven later assists Cyborg in building a new car. Villain(s): Overload, Cash, Sammy, Gizmo Note: This episode was originally aired (out of order) as the season finale.

== Home media release ==
Warner Home Video first released the first season on DVD into two parts. The first volume containing the first six episodes was released in 2004 while the second volume containing the last seven episodes of the season was released in 2005. It wasn't until 2006 that the studio finally released the complete first season. A manufacture-on-demand Blu-ray was released in 2018 by the Warner Archive Collection.

Teen Titans - The Complete First Season
Set details	Special features
13 episodes; 2-disc set (DVD); 1.33:1 aspect ratio; Subtitles: English, French, Spanish; English, French, Spanish: Dolby Digital 2.0 Stereo	Featurettes; "Finding Their Voices"; "Toon Topia Bonus Cartoons"; "Comic Creations"; "Puffy Ami Yumi"; "Puffy Ami Yumi Music Video"; "Sneak Peek at Hi Hi Puffy Ami Yumi TV Show"; Easter Eggs
DVD release date
United States	Canada
February 7, 2006	April 10, 2007
