= André LeBlanc =

André LeBlanc may refer to:

- André LeBlanc (DC Comics), an American comic books character
- André LeBlanc (artist), Haitian comic books artist
