= Ding Dong Daddy =

Publication information
- Publisher: DC Comics
- First appearance: Teen Titans #3 (January 1966)
- Created by: Bob Haney; Nick Cardy

In-story information
- Alter ego: Dowd
- Species: Human
- Place of origin: Earth
- Abilities: Expert car driver

Ding Dong Daddy is a supervillain published by DC Comics, primarily as an enemy of the Teen Titans.

== Publication history ==
Ding Dong Daddy was created by Bob Haney and Nick Cardy, and first appeared in Teen Titans #3 (January 1966). He is based on famed hot rod enthusiast Ed Roth.

== Fictional character biography ==
The President's Commission on Education asks the Teen Titans to help deal with the problem of high school dropouts. In the town of Harrison, the young heroes discover dropouts being hired by Ding-Dong Daddy Dowd, proprietor of a custom hot rod and bike shop. Learning that Dowd's operation is a criminal front, the Titans go undercover as would-be dropouts and expose his schemes, then persuade his employees to return to school.

Ding Dong Daddy later steals the Arrowcar from Speedy after Green Arrow allows Speedy to borrow it.

In the DC Rebirth relaunch, Ding Dong Daddy is reintroduced as an agent of Diablo, a private organization that specializes in dealing with metahumans. He battles Teen Titans members Arsenal, Hawk and Dove, and Lilith Clay, only to be defeated when Hawk destroys his transforming car mecha.

== In other media ==
Ding Dong Daddy appears in Teen Titans, voiced by David Johansen. This version is a member of the Brotherhood of Evil who utilizes a customized hot rod equipped with an arsenal of high-tech weaponry and employs a pit crew of gremlins who operate a mobile garage.
