= Más y Menos =

- Más y Menos as seen in Teen Titans.

Publication information
- Publisher: DC Comics
- First appearance: Teen Titans animated television series: Season 3, Episode 12: "Titans East, Part 1"; DC Universe: Teen Titans #38 (September 2006) (photo only)
- Created by: Sam Register, Glen Murakami, David Slack, Alex Soto

In-story information
- Species: Metahuman
- Team affiliations: Teen Titans; Titans East
- Abilities: Superhuman speed

Más y Menos are superheroes appearing in media published by DC Comics. They originated in the Teen Titans animated series, voiced by Freddy Rodriguez, before being incorporated into the main comics continuity.

== Fictional character biography ==
=== Teen Titans (TV series 2003-2006 and tie-in comics) ===
Más y Menos are a pair of Spanish-speaking twins from Guatemala who can move at superhuman speeds, but only when they are in contact with each other, possess a mental link, and are also known for their battle cry "¡Más y Menos, sí podemos!" which translates as, "More and Less, yes we can!". First appearing in the Teen Titans episode "Titans East" as founding members of the titular team, they establish a base in Steel City with help from Cyborg so they can locate Brother Blood. However, Blood attacks and brainwashes Titans East before forcing them to attack Cyborg. The original Teen Titans arrive to help and free Titans East from Blood's control while Cyborg defeats Blood himself.

In the episode "Calling All Titans", Más y Menos battle Johnny Rancid and Cinderblock, who overpower them and capture Menos. Más manages to escape, but loses his powers without Menos to activate them. In the following episode, "Titans Together", Más works with Beast Boy, Pantha, Herald, and Jericho to defeat the Brotherhood of Evil, who had ambushed and captured all of the other Titans.

=== Mainstream DC comics ===
Más and Menos are later introduced into the main comics continuity. They are depicted as former members of the Teen Titans who joined and left the group during the events of "One Year Later", a one-year time skip following the events of Infinite Crisis. In the limited series Speed Force, the two are forced to become enforcers for the villainous alliance Symphonee.

== Powers and abilities ==
Due to their connection to the Speed Force, Más y Menos have metahuman powers that allow them to move at superhuman speed whenever they are touching each other, with their maximum velocity being stated to be seven times the speed of sound, and can use their speed to vibrate their bodies and generate heat. Additionally, they share a mental link that allows them to locate each other and sense each other's pain while they are conscious.

== Other versions ==
- Más y Menos appear in Tiny Titans #16.
- Más y Menos appear in the Teen Titans Go! 2013 tie-in comic book.

== In other media ==
- Más y Menos appear in Teen Titans Go!, voiced again by Freddy Rodriguez.
- Más y Menos make a cameo appearance in Teen Titans Go! To the Movies.
