= Ciro Nieli =

American director and producer

Ciro Nieli is an American director, producer and designer of animated television series. He is known as the creator and executive producer of the animated series Super Robot Monkey Team Hyperforce Go!, and as the showrunner and executive producer of the animated series Teenage Mutant Ninja Turtles. He is also known as a director on seasons 1 and 2 of the animated series Teen Titans, and as one of the three developers of The Avengers: Earth's Mightiest Heroes.

On January 29, 2021, a new project by Nieli for Disney Television Animation under the name Weirdo Pizza was registered.
