= André LeBlanc (DC Comics) =

Publication information
- Publisher: DC Comics
- First appearance: Teen Titans #18 (December 1968)
- Created by: Marv Wolfman; Len Wein

André LeBlanc is a fictional character appearing in American comic books published by DC Comics. As his name implies ("André LeBlanc" translated from French into English is "Andre The White"), LeBlanc is easily identified by his highly-conspicuous white outfit.

== Publication history ==
André LeBlanc first appeared in Teen Titans #18, and was created by Marv Wolfman and Len Wein.

== Fictional character biography ==
The self-styled "world's greatest jewel thief", arrogant André LeBlanc made the international most wanted list. He often clashed with the Russian superhero Leonid Kovar (also known as Starfire and later as Red Star). LeBlanc delighted in evading capture by the young hero. Interpol requested that the Teen Titans team up with Kovar to safeguard the Crown Jewels of Sweden from LeBlanc. LeBlanc is so confident in his abilities that he announces his crimes before they are committed. Mutual antagonism spoils the joint efforts of the heroes until Kovar rescues the Titans from LeBlanc's death traps. Kid Flash saves Kovar from death on the subway tracks while Robin defeats LeBlanc in hand-to-hand combat.

== In other media ==
- André LeBlanc appears in Teen Titans, voiced by Dee Bradley Baker. This version is a member of the Brotherhood of Evil.
- André LeBlanc appears in the Batman: The Brave and the Bold episode "Four Star Spectacular!".
