= Cinderblock (character) =

- Cinderblock as seen in Teen Titans Go!

Publication information
- Publisher: DC Comics
- First appearance: Teen Titans "Divide and Conquer"
- First comic appearance: Titans (vol. 2) #17 (November 2009)
- Created by: David Slack
- Voiced by: Dee Bradley Baker

In-story information
- Abilities: In TV series: Super-strength; Durability; In comics: Regeneration

Cinderblock is a supervillain who appeared in DC Comics. He first appeared in Teen Titans (2003), voiced by Dee Bradley Baker, and was later incorporated into the comics following Final Crisis.

== Fictional character biography ==
=== Teen Titans (animated series) ===
Cinderblock is a humanoid concrete monster of unknown origin. In the episode "Divide and Conquer", Slade sends Cinderblock to break Plasmus out of prison. Despite the Titans' efforts, Cinderblock succeeds in freeing Plasmus and devastating part of the prison, inciting a prison break that the Titans stop. After Cinderblock frees Plasmus, Slade sends Cinderblock to attack the city while the Teen Titans are busy fighting Plasmus. Cinderblock is taken down by Cyborg.

In the episode "Apprentice", Robin battles Cinderblock in the sewers while looking for Slade's hideout. He is easily defeated by Robin due to a tracking device planted on him that leads Robin to Slade.

In the episode "Aftershock", Slade has Terra free Cinderblock, Overload, and Plasmus from prison and dispatches them to different parts of the city. Robin and Starfire end up fighting Cinderblock until Terra attacks them. Cinderblock is combined with Overload and Plasmus to form Ternion, a composite monster who is defeated by the Titans.

In the fifth season, Cinderblock appears as a member of the Brotherhood of Evil. In the episode "Titans Together", the remaining Titans - Jericho, Pantha, Herald, Más, and Beast Boy - convene to rescue the other Titans after they are captured by the Brotherhood. Jericho possesses Cinderblock and accesses his memories, learning that the Brotherhood's base is in Paris. Jericho and his teammates infiltrate the Brotherhood's base, with Jericho pretending to have captured his fellow Titans. However, Jericho blows his cover when he attempts to speak to Private HIVE, since Cinderblock is normally mute. After Jericho leaves his body, Cinderblock participates in the subsequent fight against the Titans, but is defeated.

=== Comics ===
Cinderblock is integrated into the mainline comics continuity in Titans #17 (2009). He is shown battling the newest incarnation of the Teen Titans in downtown San Francisco, and absorbs most of their attacks with little damage. Beast Boy and Wonder Girl impale Cinderblock with a metal pipe, causing his body to crumble. Bombshell hurls Cinderblock's head into the San Francisco Bay before he can regenerate. This version of Cinderblock is capable of speech, but speaks in a fragmented manner.

== Powers and abilities ==
Cinderblock is made of concrete and possesses superhuman strength and durability. In the comics, he can reform his body if destroyed.

== In other media ==
- Cinderblock appears in Teen Titans Go!.
- Cinderblock appears in Teen Titans (2006), voiced again by Dee Bradley Baker.
