= Teen Titans (TV series) =

American animated television series

- Genre: Action-adventure; Comedy drama; Science fantasy; Superhero
- Created by: Glen Murakami
- Based on: Teen Titans by Bob Haney, Bruno Premiani & DC Comics
- Developed by: Glen Murakami, David Slack & Sam Register
- Showrunner: Glen Murakami
- Voices of: Scott Menville; Hynden Walch; Khary Payton; Tara Strong; Greg Cipes
- Theme music composer: Andy Sturmer
- Opening theme: "Teen Titans Theme", performed by Puffy AmiYumi
- Ending theme: "Teen Titans Theme" (instrumental)
- Composer: Michael McCuistion, Kristopher Carter & Lolita Ritmanis
- Country of origin: United States
- Original language: English
- No. of seasons: 5
- No. of episodes: 65 (list of episodes)

Production
- Executive producer: Sander Schwartz
- Producer: Glen Murakami, Linda M. Steiner, Bruce Timm (seasons 1–2) & David Slack (seasons 3–5)
- Running time: 21–23 minutes
- Production companies: DC Comics (season 5); Warner Bros. Animation (Note: Credited as Warner Bros. Television Animation in episodes 1–12, current prints replace the logo with the Warner Bros. Animation logo)

Original release
- Network: Cartoon Network; Kids' WB
- Release: July 19, 2003 – September 15, 2006

Related
- Teen Titans Go!

Teen Titans is an American animated superhero comedy drama television series created by Glen Murakami, who developed the series with David Slack and Sam Register for Cartoon Network and Kids' WB. Based on the DC Comics superhero team Teen Titans, the series follows the adventures of teenage superheroes, Robin (Scott Menville), Starfire (Hynden Walch), Cyborg (Khary Payton), Raven (Tara Strong), and Beast Boy (Greg Cipes) and their war against crime in Jump City in addition to personal struggles with adolescence.

It was produced by Warner Bros. Animation and DC Comics (for season 5). The show premiered on Cartoon Network on July 19, 2003; its first two seasons also aired on Kids' WB. Initially, only four seasons were planned, but the popularity of the series led to Cartoon Network ordering a fifth season. The final half-hour episode of the show, "Things Change", aired on January 16, 2006; it was later followed by a TV movie, Teen Titans: Trouble in Tokyo, that premiered on September 15 the same year, serving as the series finale.

During its run, the series was nominated for three Annie Awards and one Motion Picture Sound Editors Award. Spin-off media included comics, DVD releases, video games, music albums, and collectible toys. In 2013, the show spawned a parody, titled Teen Titans Go!, which received a theatrical film that was released on July 27, 2018, titled Teen Titans Go! To the Movies. In 2019, a crossover film with Teen Titans Go! was released, titled Teen Titans Go! vs. Teen Titans. It features the first appearance of the original series characters after 13 years.

== Premise ==
The Teen Titans from left to right: Cyborg, Robin, Beast Boy, Starfire, and Raven

Teen Titans is based primarily on stories by Marv Wolfman and George Pérez from the 1980s, featuring characters, storylines, and concepts introduced during the run, and incorporating a similar group of members. The five main members of the eponymous team in the series are Robin (Scott Menville), the intelligent and capable leader of the Teen Titans; Starfire (Hynden Walch), a quirky, curious alien princess from the planet Tamaran; Cyborg (Khary Payton), a cyborg armed with extraordinary strength and technological prowess; Raven (Tara Strong), a stoic girl from the parallel world Azarath who draws upon dark energy and psionic abilities; and Beast Boy (Greg Cipes), a good-natured joker who can transform into various animals. They are situated in Titans Tower, a large T-shaped building featuring living quarters, a command center, and a variety of training facilities on an island just offshore from the West Coast metropolis of Jump City. The team deals with all manner of criminal activity and threats to the city, while dealing with their own struggles with adolescence, their mutual friendships, and their limitations.

The first season focuses on the Teen Titans' introduction to the mysterious supervillain Slade (Ron Perlman), who seeks to turn Robin into his apprentice. The second season is an adaptation of "The Judas Contract" storyline where new hero Terra (Ashley Johnson) joins the team while secretly plotting against them with Slade. The third season depicts Cyborg's conflict with H.I.V.E. and their leader Brother Blood (John DiMaggio), prompting Cyborg to form the superhero team Titans East with Aqualad (Wil Wheaton), Speedy (Mike Erwin), Bumblebee (T'Keyah Crystal Keymáh), and Más y Menos (Freddy Rodriguez). In the fourth season, Raven finds herself unwillingly involved in a plot that threatens the existence of the world when her demon father Trigon (Kevin Michael Richardson) seeks to enslave the Earth. For the fifth season, the Teen Titans join forces with several other heroes to combat the Brotherhood of Evil, Beast Boy's longtime adversaries, and their army of villains.

== Episodes ==
Each season contains a distinct story arc that is centered on a specific Titan on the team. Starfire is the only individual member who was part of the original roster to not have a season focused on her.

Season	Episodes	Originally released		Season-centric Titan(s)
Season	Episodes	First released	Last released	Season-centric Titan(s)
1	13	July 19, 2003	November 11, 2003	Robin
2	13	January 10, 2004	August 21, 2004	Terra
3	13	August 28, 2004	January 22, 2005	Cyborg
Special		January 3, 2005		—N/a
4	13	January 17, 2005	July 16, 2005	Raven
5	13	September 24, 2005	January 16, 2006	Beast Boy
Movie		September 15, 2006		—N/a
Crossover		September 24, 2019		—N/a

== Cast and characters ==
=== Main ===
- Scott Menville as Robin
- Hynden Walch as Starfire
- Khary Payton as Cyborg
- Tara Strong as Raven
- Greg Cipes as Beast Boy

=== Secret identities ===
Unlike most other superhero television series, the Teen Titans characters maintain their superhero identities at all times, with any hints at the concept of an alter ego or secret identity rarely explored.

It was really important to me that little kids watching it could identify with characters. And I thought that the minute you start giving them secret identities then kids couldn't project themselves onto the characters anymore. And that was important to me. I know it's kind of important to have secret identities and stuff like that but we wanted everything to be really, really, iconic. Like, "Oh, there's the robot guy. There's the alien girl. There's the witch girl. There's the shape-changing boy. There's the…" We just wanted it really clean like that. We wanted it like old Star Trek. We just wanted it simple…

…And the whole "Who's Robin?" controversy is really kind of interesting to me. My big concern is just trying to make Robin cool. And just really set Robin apart from Batman. So if it seems like I'm avoiding the question, I sort of am. Because I don't think it's really important. My concern is how do I make Robin a really strong lead character without all that other stuff. And I feel that way about all the characters. How can I keep all the characters really iconic and really clean.

— Glen Murakami, Drawing Inspiration: An Interview with Glen Murakami, April 2004

The secret identity of Robin, an alias assumed by multiple characters in the comics, is never explicitly revealed in the series, but several hints are provided to suggest he is Dick Grayson, the original Robin and founding member of the Teen Titans:

- Robin's alternate dimensional counterpart Larry in the episode "Fractured" is named Nosyarg Kcid, and (a caption draws attention to the fact that) this is Dick Grayson spelled backwards.
- Robin's future counterpart in the episode "How Long Is Forever?" has taken on the identity of Nightwing, Grayson's second superhero alias.
- The main romance in the show is Robin's relationship with Starfire, whom Grayson would romance in the comics.
- In the episode X, wherein an antagonist steals an alias Robin created (when impersonating a supervillain) has Beast Boy speculate that the impostor is Jason Todd, who replaced Dick Grayson as Robin (in the comics).
- A glimpse into Robin's consciousness by Raven in the episode "Haunted" shows the memory of two acrobats falling from a trapeze, a reference to the death of Grayson's acrobat parents being the catalyst for him becoming Robin.
- Further connections to the Batman mythos include two references in the episode "The Apprentice", when Robin responds to a suggestion by the villain Slade that he "might be like a father to [him]" with "I already have a father" (which transitions to a shot of flying bats) and a fight scene on the rooftop of Wayne Enterprises. Likewise, in the episode The Quest, Robin responds to his Samurai antagonist telling him he’s been trained by the best by saying “so have I.” Furthermore, in the episode Go (the Titans’ Origin Story), a group of bats heralds Robin ambushing a criminal who then tells Robin “this isn’t your town, aren’t you supposed to be with” only for Robin to cut him off by saying “just moved here and, from now on, I work alone”. Later, in the same episode, Beast Boy offers Robin his services as a sidekick and Robin responds “I just went solo”.

The Teen Titans Go! episode "Permanent Record" would satirize the mystery of Robin's identity by explicitly giving his name as "Robin v.3: Tim Drake" (the third Robin), with "Dick Grayson" and "Jason Todd" (the second Robin) being written over. Subsequent episodes, however, establish him as Dick Grayson through vague flashbacks to his boyhood at Haley Circus.

In the comics, Starfire and Raven are the real names of their respective characters. While the show does not specify this with the latter, the former acknowledges "Starfire" as the English translation of her name in the season 5 episode "Go!" and her native name, Koriand'r, is used in the season 3 episode "Betrothed". The comic versions of these characters, however, also use the civilian aliases Kory Anders and Rachel Roth, which are not used on the show.

The policy of not mentioning the characters' secret identities would be broken in the season 5 premiere "Homecoming" when Elasti-Girl refers to Beast Boy by his real name, Garfield. Cyborg's real name in the comics, Victor Stone, is referenced in the season 3 premiere "Deception" when he uses "Stone" as an undercover alias, although the series does not identify this as his real name.

== Production ==
=== Soundtrack ===
The series is known for featuring both an English and Japanese version of its title theme song, created by Andy Sturmer and performed by Japanese band Puffy AmiYumi. The title theme used in the regions where the show was broadcast varied; some would play only one version, while Japan - and the English language video editions - would use both, according to the respective episode's plot theme: the English lyrics for more serious stories, and the Japanese version for more comedic tones.

The first-season episode "Mad Mod" also featured another song by Puffy AmiYumi, "K2G". In the feature-length film Trouble in Tokyo, a literal translation of the Japanese song, whose actual lyrics differ greatly from its English counterpart, is performed for comedic effect.

=== Discontinuation and proposed rebranding ===
In mid-November 2005, TitansTower.com reported that prospects for a sixth season were unlikely, and fans were urged to express their support for the show to Cartoon Network. Several days after this initial posting, the fifth season was announced to be the last. Series story editor Rob Hoegee and series director Heather Maxwell stated that Cartoon Network chose not to renew the show, and that the ending to the fifth season was written with the awareness that it would probably be the series finale, thus there were never any plans for a sixth season, otherwise they would not have ended the fifth season the way they did with "Things Change".

As early as August 2006, there were reports that Teen Titans would undergo a possible rebranding, with producer Glen Murakami citing the 1995 hiatus of Batman: The Animated Series, which was retooled in 1997 as The New Batman Adventures. According to Hoegee, this had been suggested by Sam Register, producer of the series, after he and producer David Slack had left the show, leaving Murakami and story editor and writer Amy Wolfram to develop and put together a pitch for the rebrand that would have expanded the team with the characters introduced in the fifth season, and bring in a brand new villain who had ties to some classic Titans villains from the comics. Murakami also expressed interest in using Phobia, Mister Twister, and Ravager. When they had sent the pitch in, it was ultimately declined. Wil Wheaton (Aqualad's voice actor) revealed that new Warner Bros. Feature Animation executives made the decision to not renew the show based on the repitch. Slack stated that he was given different reasons for not renewing the show; either the ratings dropped after the "scary" season 4, or Mattel wanted the show dead because Bandai had the show's toy deal. Mattel was named as "master toy licensee" in 2006 by Cartoon Network.

After the series finale, Warner Bros. Animation released a feature film titled Teen Titans: Trouble in Tokyo. The film premiered at San Diego Comic-Con and was shown on Cartoon Network first on September 15, 2006, and releasing on DVD on February 6, 2007.

In April 2021, ComicBookMovie.com founder Nate Best reported acquiring pitch documents for the rebrand and shared details in an exclusive article. According to Best, the rebrand would have been titled New Teen Titans, and would have featured a rotating cast rather than focusing on the original five members. Some of these proposed teamups included:

- Robin, Speedy, Aqualad, and Kid Flash (a tribute to the original Titans from the comic book)
- Kid Flash, Más y Menos
- Wildebeest, Jericho, and Gnarrk
- Hot Spot, Killowat, and Red Star
- Raven, Starfire, Kole, Argent, Bumblebee, and Pantha (in a story titled "Truth or Dare")

The show was slated to introduce new villains, notably one named "Athena" who had the Midas touch and was accompanied by an ever-changing roster of superpowered suiters as well as a posse of robot girls, and other groups of teenagers as throwbacks to previous villains such as Mad Mod and Control Freak. The pitch documents included information on a holiday episode, as well as a plotline in which Herald would unknowingly create a rift in "Dimension X", allowing a microscopic, self-replicating creature to travel to Earth. According to series artist Derrick J. Wyatt, this would have tied back to the unnamed creature from the series finale "Things Change". Series artist Brianne Drouhard has also stated doing visual development on a character that was not mentioned in the reporting.

=== Crossover with Teen Titans Go! ===
A mid-credits scene from Teen Titans Go! To the Movies featured the 2003 Titans' return, in which Robin states they have "found a way back".

In 2019, Warner Bros. released a crossover film featuring the Titans from both shows, titled Teen Titans Go! vs. Teen Titans. The film premiered at San Diego Comic-Con on July 21, followed by a digital release on September 24 and a DVD and Blu-ray release on October 15. The events of the film take place during the fifth season of Teen Titans Go!.

== Legacy ==
The series was revisited as a series of shorts in 2012 for the DC Nation programming block on Cartoon Network. Dubbed New Teen Titans, the shorts began airing on September 11. The shorts featured the Titans in chibi form, with the principal cast members of the original series returning.

Ciro Nieli, one of the show's directors, would go on to create Disney's Super Robot Monkey Team Hyperforce Go!, another superhero action show with a large anime influence, but premiered in 2004 on Jetix, and featured Beast Boy's voice actor Greg Cipes as the voice of Chiro, the show's main protagonist. Sam Register also made his own show in 2004 with Hi Hi Puffy AmiYumi on Cartoon Network, which was based on the pop duo who did the theme song, and also had an anime influence, but was created more to be a slapstick comedy in the veins of Looney Tunes and the various cartoon films of Tex Avery.

Teen Titans Go! was announced as an updated version (not a spin-off), featuring many of the same voices, but is not significantly related in terms of story to both the Teen Titans series and the New Teen Titans shorts. The series premiered on April 23, 2013.

Richardson, Payton, Strong, Cipes, and Walch reprised their respective character roles as Trigon, Cyborg, Raven, Beast Boy, Starfire, and Blackfire in DC Super Hero Girls.

Payton reprised his role as Cyborg in Lego DC Comics: Batman Be-Leaguered, Lego DC Comics Super Heroes: Justice League vs. Bizarro League, Lego DC Comics Super Heroes: Justice League – Attack of the Legion of Doom, Lego DC Comics Super Heroes: Justice League – Cosmic Clash, Lego DC Comics Super Heroes: Justice League – Gotham City Breakout along with Cipes, Walch, and Menville (although he played the Damian Wayne Robin), Lego DC Comics Super Heroes: The Flash, and Lego DC Comics Super Heroes: Aquaman – Rage of Atlantis. He has also reprised his role as Cyborg in Justice League Action.

Several character details from Teen Titans, like Raven's standard incantation Azarath Metrion Zinthos and Beast Boy's super-werewolf form from the episode "The Beast Within", were incorporated into the animated film Justice League vs. Teen Titans.

=== Impact on DC continuity ===
Teen Titans has never been established to be a part of the larger DC Animated Universe or The Batman animated series. Series producer Bruce Timm said the series would not cross over with Justice League Unlimited. Despite this, the series was alluded to in the Static Shock episode "Hard as Nails", where Static asked Batman where Robin was, to which Batman responded, "With the Titans...You'll meet them some day". The character Speedy, who first appeared in the episode "Winner Take All", later appeared in Justice League Unlimited with the same costume design and voice actor (Mike Erwin). Kid Flash was voiced by Michael Rosenbaum in his appearances in the show, who was the same actor who voiced the Flash in Justice League Unlimited; both characters are the Wally West incarnations. The follow-up series, Teen Titans Go!, has featured several appearances by Batman, but they have all been non-speaking appearances. Both Batman and Alfred Pennyworth appear in DC Nation's New Teen Titans "Red X Unmasked". In the season 2 episode of Teen Titans Go!, "Let's Get Serious", Aqualad (voiced by Khary Payton), Superboy, and Miss Martian of the Young Justice team appear.

Much like the DC Animated Universe (as well as X-Men: Evolution and Spider-Man and His Amazing Friends), the series has affected the comics that initially inspired it, including: Beast Boy adopting the series' purple and black outfit during DC's "52" storyline and later appearing with the pointed ears and fanged teeth originated by the series, future Cyborg having the same armor pattern of his animated counterpart in the Titans Tomorrow storyline, Raven adapting her animated counterpart's costume design in the "One Year Later" storyline, the characters Más y Menos making appearances in 52 and the Final Crisis limited series, the character Joto was renamed "Hot Spot" during 52 to match his animated counterpart, and the villain Cinderblock appearing in a fight with the comic incarnation of the Titans. Red X is later included in the mainstream comic publications through the two-issue teaser comic Future State: Teen Titans and its follow-up series, Teen Titans Academy.

== Reception ==
Early into the series' run, executive producer and Cartoon Network and Warner Bros. Animation vice president Sam Register responded to criticism regarding the style of the show with a statement slightly contradicting Murakami's statement about wanting Robin to "be cool" with his metal-tipped boots:

Justice League is awesome and Samurai Jack is awesome and we buy a lot of anime shows that are great, but those shows really are directed more towards the nine to fourteen age group, and the six and seven and eight-year-olds were not gelling with the Justice League and some of the more of the fanboy shows... The main mission was making a good superhero show for kids. Now if the fanboys happen to like the Teen Titans also, that's great, but that was not our mission.

— Sam Register, CBR News interview, May 8, 2004

While the series' creators initially stated that younger children were the intended audience for the series, Teen Titans Go! writer J. Torres notes that the progression and deeper themes of the show widened the appeal to a much broader audience:

... [The show] started out skewed a lot younger... but along the way, I think the producers discovered it was reaching a wider audience. ... [the show] got into some darker story lines, and they introduced a lot more characters, so they expanded on it, and they let the show evolve with the audience.

— J. Torres, Titans Companion 2 by Glen Cadigan

In 2009, Teen Titans was named the 83rd best animated series by IGN.

TVLine lists the theme song from the series among the best animated series themes of all time.

=== Awards and nominations ===
2005 Annie Awards

- Outstanding Storyboarding in an Animated Television Production (Nominated)

2004 Annie Awards

- Outstanding Music in an Animated Television Production (Nominated)
- Outstanding Storyboarding in an Animated Television Production (Nominated)

2004 Motion Picture Sound Editors Awards

- Best Sound Editing in Television Animation (Nominated)

== Broadcast ==
- US: Cartoon Network & Boomerang
- UK: Cartoon Network UK, Toonami UK & CITV
- Australia: Cartoon Network Australia, 9Network & 9Go!
- Nigeria: Cartoon Network Nigeria, Africa Magic & Africa Magic World
- South Africa: Cartoon Network South Africa, Toonami South Africa, Mzansi Magic, Mzansi Wethu, One Magic & SABC 1

== In other media ==
=== Home media ===
From September 28, 2004, to September 20, 2005, Warner Brothers released three volumes (the entire first season and the first six-season two episodes) of the series, but cancelled other volumes. From February 7, 2006, to July 22, 2008, Warner released complete season releases on two-disc sets. Warner Bros. Home Entertainment released the complete series box set on the seven-disc set on October 2, 2018, and on Blu-ray on December 3, 2019.

Season		Episodes	Release date
Season		Episodes	Region 1
1	2003	13	Volume 1: Divide and Conquer: September 28, 2004; Episode(s): "Final Exam" – "Nevermore" Volume 2: Switched: April 12, 2005; Episode(s): "Switched" – "Car Trouble" The Complete First Season: February 7, 2006; October 2, 2018 (complete series re-release); January 23, 2018; December 3, 2019 (Blu-ray release)
2	2004	13	Volume 3: Fear Itself: September 20, 2005; Episode(s): "How Long Is Forever?" – "Date with Destiny" The Complete Second Season: September 12, 2006; October 2, 2018 (complete series re-release); December 3, 2019 (Blu-ray release)
3	2004–05	13	April 10, 2007; October 2, 2018 (complete series re-release); December 3, 2019 (Blu-ray release)
4	2005	13	November 20, 2007; October 2, 2018 (complete series re-release); December 3, 2019 (Blu-ray release)
5	2005–06	13	July 8, 2008; October 2, 2018 (complete series re-release); December 3, 2019 (Blu-ray release)
Specials	2006–07	2	Trouble in Tokyo + "The Lost Episode": February 6, 2007; December 3, 2019 (Blu-ray release)

=== Comics ===
From 2004 to 2008, DC Comics published a comic book series based on Teen Titans called Teen Titans Go!. The series was written by J. Torres and Todd Nauck, and illustrated by Larry Stucker. While the comic's stories stand independently, its issues were done so as not to contradict events established in the animated series' episodes. Often, Teen Titans Go! also referenced episodes of the show, as well as expanding on parts of the series.

In July 2024, DC Comics published a comic book series named Primer: Clashing Colors that features this iteration of the Teen Titans. It is written by Thomas Krajewski and Jennifer Muro, and illustrated by Gretel Lusky. The comic focuses on Ashley Rayburn putting her powers to the test in order to be put on the team with the rest of the main cast.

=== Toys ===
Bandai released a line of action figures based on the Teen Titans animated series. The line included 1.5 inch "Comic Book Hero" mini figures, 3.5 inch action figures (including "Teen Titans Launch Tower Playset", "Teen Titans Command Center", "Battling Machines", "T-Vehicles", "T-Sub Deluxe Vehicles"), 5 inch action figures, 6.5 inch plush Super-D Toys, and 10 inch figures. Amongst the characters included in the line were the main members of the Teen Titans, Titans East, and various allies and villains.

=== Video games ===
Teen Titans is a video game released on October 16, 2005 for the Game Boy Advance. It was the first video game adaptation based on the animated television series. The plot of the game followed Brother Blood having stolen copies of the Titans' DNA to create a clone army. Playable characters featured the main cast, Robin, Raven, Beast Boy, Starfire, and Cyborg. A console version of the game and a sequel titled Teen Titans 2 was released in 2006.

== Films ==
Teen Titans: Trouble in Tokyo, is made-for-television film that aired on Cartoon Network on September 15, 2006 as the series finale, When a high-tech ninja called Saico-Tek goes on a spree of destruction in Jump City with color coordinated glaives that explode, the Teen Titans stop him from destroying everything until Robin captures him. Using a translation program Robin discovers that Saico-Tek expresses fear of failing his master, Brushogun, who is based in Japan. He then triggers a fire sprinkler, causing him to dissolve into black goo. Subsequently the Titans head to Tokyo, Japan to search for Brushogun.

Teen Titans Go! vs. Teen Titans, released on July 21, 2019, features the main cast of Teen Titans along with the one of Teen Titans Go! in a crossover where both versions must fight villains from their respective worlds.

Justice League: Crisis on Infinite Earths – Part Three, released on July 16, 2024, contains a cameo where Titans Tower from the animated series can be momentarily seen.

== See also ==
- Justice League (TV series)
- Justice League Unlimited
- Young Justice (TV series)
