= Mad Mod =

Fictional character in DC Comics

Publication information
- Publisher: DC Comics
- First appearance: Teen Titans #7 (January–February 1967)
- Created by: Bob Haney; Nick Cardy

In-story information
- Full name: Neil Richards
- Species: Human
- Place of origin: Earth
- Abilities: Skilled engineer

Mad Mod (Neil Richards) is a fictional character appearing in American comic books published by DC Comics. The character is known as one of the first recurring villains of the Teen Titans.

== Publication history ==
Mad Mod first appeared in Teen Titans #7 and was created by Bob Haney and Nick Cardy.

== Fictional character biography ==
One of the first villains to menace the Teen Titans, Mad Mod (real name Neil Richards) is a Carnaby Street fashion designer with no innate superpowers. His codename is derived from the popular Mod style in England at the time. Mad Mod initially uses his fashion label as a front to smuggle goods inside his clothing. After being foiled, he hatches a plot to steal the Queen of Britain's scepter, but is thwarted by the Titans.

The character disappeared following the cancellation of the original Teen Titans and was absent from the 1980–1994 series written by Marv Wolfman. Mad Mod resurfaces in the Dan Jurgens-written Teen Titans series of the mid-1990s as a reformed villain who now works as a costume designer for the Teen Titans.

In The New 52 continuity reboot, Mad Mod is a member of a group known as Diablo that seeks to prevent the original Teen Titans from regaining their memories of their original incarnation of the group. Mad Mod is portrayed as a hipster figure with a handlebar moustache and is much younger than his pre-New 52 incarnation. Mad Mod interrogates Bumblebee after her husband Mal Duncan is kidnapped by Mister Twister. When Mad Mod realizes that the Titans have regained their memories, he orders the team killed to stop Mister Twister from using them in an occult ritual.

== Powers and abilities ==
During Mad Mod's heyday as a villain, he would match his outrageous clothing with a way out approach in his intricate but deadly traps. He would employ a gang of thugs to do most of the handiwork that needed muscle.

== Other versions ==
An alternate universe version of Mad Mod appears in Titans Tomorrow.

== In other media ==
=== Television ===
An illusion of Mad Mod's younger self as depicted in Teen Titans.

- Mad Mod appears in Teen Titans (2003), voiced by Malcolm McDowell. This version is an old man, Anglophile, and ally of the Brotherhood of Evil who views the Teen Titans as rebellious "snots", and utilizes robots, hypnotic holographic projectors, death traps, and illusions controlled by his cane, which also allowed him to drain youth on one occasion.
- Mad Mod appears in the "New Teen Titans" segment of DC Nation Shorts. This version possesses a machine resembling the TARDIS capable of manipulating time and his age.
- Mad Mod appears in the Teen Titans Go! episodes "Salty Codgers" and "Teen Titans Go to the Repair Shop", voiced again by Malcolm McDowell for the latter. This version possesses the ability to drain youth through his cane.

=== Film ===
Mad Mod makes a non-speaking cameo appearance in Teen Titans Go! To the Movies.

=== Video games ===
- Mad Mod appears as an unlockable character in Teen Titans (2006) via the "Master of Games" mode, voiced by Greg Ellis.
- Mad Mod appears as a character summon in Scribblenauts Unmasked: A DC Comics Adventure.

=== Miscellaneous ===
Mad Mod appears in Batman: The Brave and the Bold.
