= Mike Erwin =

American actor

- Other name: Michael Erwin
- Occupation: Actor
- Years active: 1992–present

Mike Erwin sometimes credited as Michael Erwin, is an American actor. He is known for playing Colin Hart from 2002 to 2006 in the The WB television series Everwood and for voicing Jak in the Jak and Daxter video game series from 2003 to 2005 and 2011.

== Filmography ==
=== Film ===
Year	Title	Role	Notes
2002	The New Guy	Travis	
2003	Hulk	16-year-old Bruce Banner	
2004	Freshman Orientation	Matt	
2005	Pretty Persuasion	Barry	
2007	Kush	Christian	
2007	Clarity	Joshua Black	Short film
2008	Chaos Theory	Ed	
2009	A Good Funeral	Howard	
2010	Wreckage	Jared	
2011	Little Birds	Mark Muller	
2014	Faded	Ray	Short film
2015	Single in South Beach	Nick	
2015	Family Impossible	Cash Fitzwater	Short film
2016	Jim Shoe	Jim Shoe	
2016	A Love Story	The Man	Short
2016	Quality Problems	Lumbersexual	
2017	And Then There Was Eve	Neil	
2017	Angela	Party Date	Short

=== Television ===
Year	Title	Role	Notes
2001	Undressed	Lyle	Television series
2001	Virtually Casey	Brady Collins	Television film
2001	Judging Amy	Max Pagano	Episode: "The Last Word"
2001	7th Heaven	Hugh	Episode: "Work"
2002	Reba	Eric	Episode: "A Mid-Semester's Night Dream"
2002	Touched by an Angel	Blake	Episode: "Forever Young"
2002	Do Over	Rob	Episode: "Rock 'n' Roll Parking Lot"
2002–2004	Everwood	Colin Hart	Recurring role
2003	That's So Raven	Sam	Episode: "A Dog by Any Other Name"
2003	One Tree Hill	Gabe	Episode: "The Search for Something More"
2003	Trash	Richard "Mac" Macadoo	Television film
2003–2005	Jackie Chan Adventures	Strikemaster Ice (voice)	Recurring role
2004	She's Too Young	Nick Hartman	Television film
2004	CSI: Miami	Kyle Preston	Episode: "Innocent"
2004	Joan of Arcadia	Lars Klosterman	Episode: "The Election"
2004	The Robinsons: Lost in Space	Don West	Pilot
2004	CSI: Crime Scene Investigation	Dean Tate	Episode: "Formalities"
2004–2006	Teen Titans	Roy Harper / Speedy (voice)	Recurring role
2005	The Studio	Tommy LaChance	Episode: "Pilot"
2005	Jack & Bobby	Nate Edmonds	Recurring role
2006	Justice League Unlimited	Roy Harper / Speedy (voice)	Episode: "Patriot Act"
2006–2007	The War at Home	Mark	2 episodes
2007	NCIS	Devon Watkins	Episode: "Angel of Death"
2007	Ghost Whisperer	Kevin Graham	Episode: "Double Exposure"
2008	Dexter	Fred "Freebo" Bowman	2 episodes
2009	CSI: Crime Scene Investigation	Julian Bristol	Episode: "Bloodsport"
2010	The Vampire Diaries	Charlie	Episode: "Founder's Day"
2011	Jesse Stone: Innocents Lost	Lewis Lipinsky	Television film
2013	Magic City	Ira Styne	Episode: "Sitting on Top of the World"
2016	Code Black	Randall Underwood	Episode: "Second Year"
2017	Bones	Matt Bodgan	Episode: "The Final Chapter: The Tutor in the Tussle"
2017	Major Crimes	Dean Lewis	Episode: "Cleared History"
2017	NCIS: Los Angeles	Pacey Smith	Episode: "Old Tricks"
2017	Colony	Darin	Episode: "Tamam Shud"
2022	NCIS	Sam Radner	Episode: "The Wake"

=== Video games ===
Year	Title	Voice role	Notes
2003	Jak II	Jak	
2004	Hot Shots Golf Fore!	Jak	
2004	Jak 3	Jak	
2005	Teen Titans	Roy Harper / Speedy	
2005	Jak X: Combat Racing	Jak	
2011	PlayStation Move Heroes	Jak	
