= Glen Murakami =

American animator, artist, character designer, director and producer

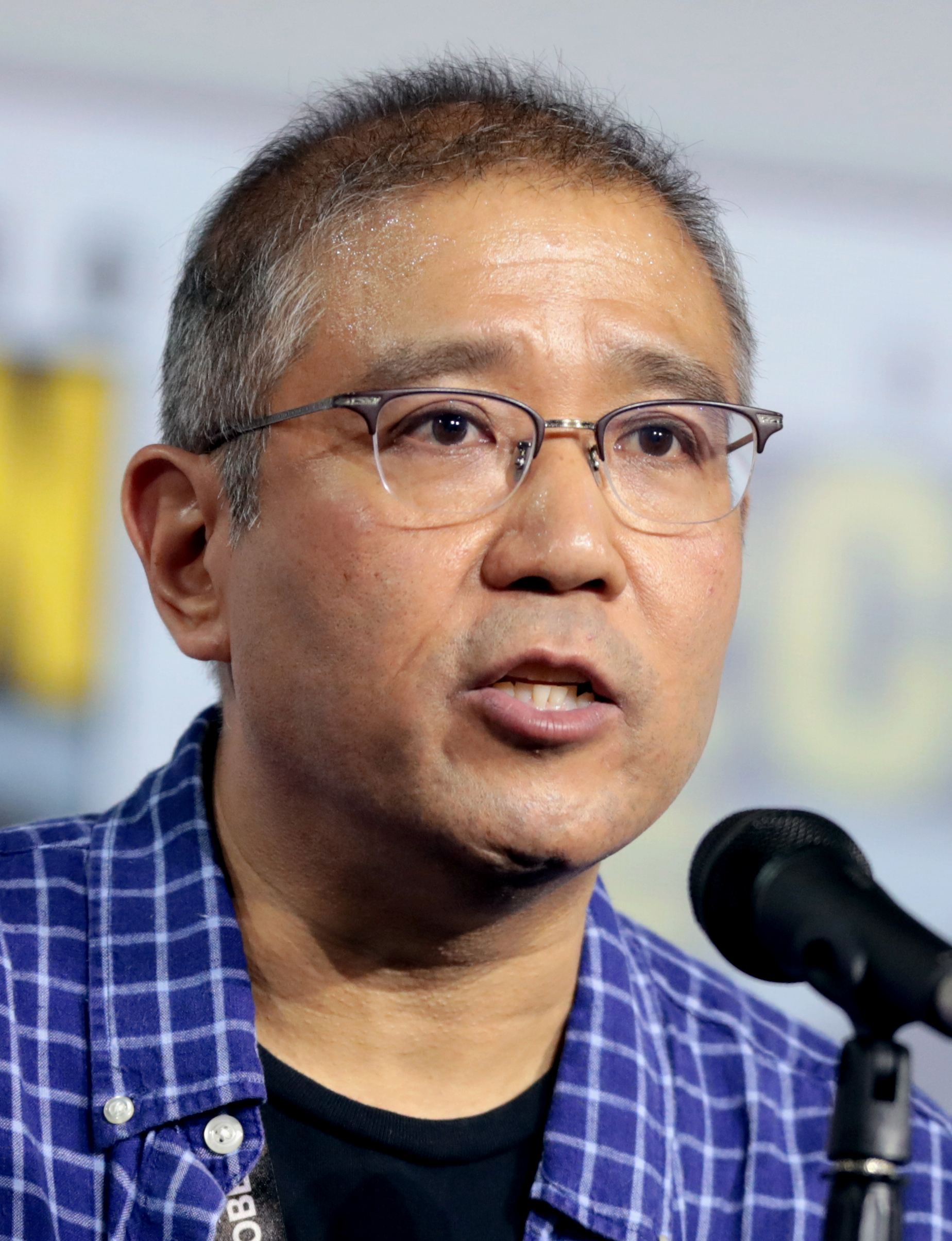
- Murakami at the 2019 San Diego Comic-Con
- Occupations: Animator, director, artist, character designer, producer
- Notable work: Teen Titans (2003–2006); Batman Beyond (1999–2001); The Batman (2004–2008, Seasons 1-3); Beware the Batman (2013–2014); Ben 10: Alien Force (2008–2010); Ben 10: Ultimate Alien (2010–2012)

Glen Murakami is a Japanese-American animator, artist, character designer, director and producer best known for his work on Teen Titans, Batman Beyond, The Batman, Beware the Batman, Ben 10: Alien Force and Ben 10: Ultimate Alien. Murakami is the creator and producer of the Cartoon Network series Teen Titans.

== Animation ==
Murakami originally wanted to be a comic book artist. His friend from junior high and high school, Keith Weesner, got a job working on Batman: The Animated Series as a background artist and informed Murakami when they were hiring artists at Warner Bros. Animation. Murakami was given a storyboard test, which he failed. But seeing his drawing talent, he was hired anyway.

Working closely with Bruce Timm, Murakami worked as a character designer and storyboard artist from 1991 to 1993. From 1995 to 1999, Murakami worked as Art Director on Superman: The Animated Series and The New Batman/Superman Adventures.

=== Batman Beyond ===
Murakami was promoted to producer for Batman Beyond and won an Emmy Award in 2001 for his work on the series. In addition to producing, he also was credited for story on the direct-to-video film Batman Beyond: Return of the Joker.

=== Teen Titans ===
In 2002, according to Murakami in an interview in 2012, Sam Register, Senior Vice President of development at Cartoon Network at the time, wanted a show that was based on the comics, Teen Titans, and brought Murakami, who already had a history with Batman Beyond and Superman: The Animated Series to create the new series based on the comics, the Teen Titans. "I just felt like the Teen Titans was one of the properties left in the DC Universe that hadn't been turned into a cartoon yet, but really needed to be" stated Register. After seeing Murakami's unusual anime influenced style for the show, Register thought it worked, for which he stated: "There are elements that you can totally pull from [those shows] and that's because Glen comes from that world. But one of the criteria for developing Teen Titans was I wanted a whole new look. I wanted to be completely surprised. I wanted something that kind of popped. And that anime style was going to do that." With the direction for the new show put in place, Murakami, as the show's creator, would co-develop the series with Register and television writer David Slack and serve as the show's producer. After a decade working on shows produced by his friend and mentor Bruce Timm, Murakami produced the Teen Titans without Timm, which was his first series without him.

In addition to being series creator and producer, he was also character designer on the series. Murakami approached the show with an unusual design style, setting them apart from the rest of DC Comics animated programing. The show's style was dubbed Murakanime or "Americanime".

On developing the characters from the comics to the show, Murakami made sure that they were unique and different enough from other former DC shows. He stated: "We picked the characters that we thought were the most iconic and the most symbolic." "I wanted it to be very, very clear to understand them. Robin's the leader. Starfire's the alien, but she's also the metaphor for the foreign exchange student or outsider. Cyborg's the strong man. Beast Boy's the funny one, but he's insecure. He can be all of these animals, but at the same time he's still really insecure. Early on, my whole thing was I wanted to understand their flaws because I thought that's what will make them human. I think sometimes with the Justice League, all the characters are in some ways so perfect it makes it hard to relate to them!'

The popular series ran for five seasons, 65 episodes and concluded with the film Teen Titans: Trouble in Tokyo in 2006.

=== Ben 10: Alien Force and Ben 10: Ultimate Alien ===
Following Teen Titans, Murakami teamed up with writer Dwayne McDuffie to revamp a series for Cartoon Network's Ben 10 franchise. Murakami served as executive producer on Ben 10: Alien Force, which ran for three seasons and 46 episodes.

Immediately following Alien Force, Murakami and McDuffie revamped the follow-up series, Ben 10: Ultimate Alien.

=== Beware the Batman ===
In 2011, Warner Bros. Animation announced that Murakami would be executive producer on an animated television series Beware the Batman.

== Comics ==
Murakami illustrated the Star Wars comic Death Star Pirates - originally published in issues #16 through #20 of the Star Wars kids magazine in 1998 and later collected in Star Wars Tales Volume 2 by Dark Horse Comics.

He also drew a cover for Teen Titans Go!, and wrote and drew for stories in Batman Adventures and Batman: Mad Love and Other Stories, winning an Eisner Award for his work in the Batman Adventures Holiday Special.

== Awards ==
- Eisner Award - Best Single Issue - 1995 - 'Batman Adventures Holiday' Special (with Paul Dini, Bruce Timm, Ronnie del Carmen, and others)
- Annie Award - Outstanding Individual Achievement for Production Design in an Animated Television Production - 1999 - Legends of the Dark Knight - 'The New Batman/Superman Adventures'/Outstanding Achievement in a Daytime Animated Television Production - 2001 - 'Batman Beyond' (with Jean MacCurdy, Alan Burnett, Paul Dini, and others)
- Emmy Award - Outstanding Special Class Animated Program - 2001 - 'Batman Beyond' (with Jean MacCurdy, Alan Burnett, Paul Dini, Bruce Timm, Hilary Bader, Stan Berkowitz, Rich Fogel, Robert Goodman, Curt Geda, Butch Lukic, Dan Riba, James Tucker, Andrea Romano)

== Influences ==
Murakami's influences include Jack Kirby, Alex Toth, John Byrne, Gilbert Hernandez, Jaime Hernandez, and Dave Stevens.

== Filmography ==
=== Film, as writer ===
Year	Title	Credited as			Company
Year	Title	Writer	Producer	Developer	Company
1993	Batman: Mask of the Phantasm	No	Yes		Warner Bros.
2000	Batman Beyond: Return of the Joker	No	Yes		Warner Bros.
2006	Teen Titans: Trouble in Tokyo	No	Yes	No	Warner Bros.
2008	Justice League: The New Frontier	No	Yes		Warner Bros.

=== Television, as writer ===
Year	Title	Credited as				Network	Notes
Year	Title	Writer	Producer	Developer	Showrunner	Network	Notes
1992–1995	Batman: The Animated Series	No		Yes	No	Fox Kids	
1996–1999	Superman: The Animated Series	No	Yes		No	Kids' WB	
1999–2001	The New Batman Adventures	No		Yes	No	Kids' WB	
1999–2001	Batman Beyond	No	Yes	No		Kids' WB	
1996–1999	Justice League	No	Yes	No	No	Cartoon Network	
2003–2006	Teen Titans	No	Yes			Cartoon Network	
2004–2008	The Batman	No	Yes	No		Kids' WB	
2008–2010	Ben 10: Alien Force	No	Yes			Cartoon Network	
2010–2012	Ben 10: Ultimate Alien	No	Yes			Cartoon Network	
2013–2014	Beware the Batman	No	Yes			Cartoon Network	
