= Starfire (Teen Titans) =

DC Comics superheroine

- Starfire as she appears on the cover of Teen Titans #16 (March, 2018). Art by Sami Basri and Jessica Kholinne.

Publication information
- Publisher: DC Comics
- First appearance: DC Comics Presents #26 (October 1980)
- Created by: Marv Wolfman; George Pérez

In-story information
- Full name: Koriand'r
- Species: Tamaranean
- Place of origin: Tamaran
- Team affiliations: Teen Titans; Outsiders; Justice League; R.E.B.E.L.S. The Outlaws
- Partnerships: Nightwing; Donna Troy; Animal Man; Adam Strange; Blue Beetle (Jaime Reyes)
- Notable aliases: Kory Anders
- Abilities: Tamaranean physiology converts ultraviolet radiation into energy; grants superhuman strength, speed, durability, endurance, agility, stamina, flight, temperature/radiation immunity, and can assimilate language through lip contact.; Experimentation grants the ability to project energy and heat, her "Starbolts" which she can direct from her hands or eyes.; Highly trained warrior; proficiency in hand-to-hand combat, weaponry, leadership, and space flight.

Starfire is a superheroine created by Marv Wolfman and George Pérez appearing in American comic books created by DC Comics. She debuted in a preview story inserted within DC Comics Presents #26 (October, 1980). Since the character's introduction, Starfire has been a major recurring character in Teen Titans and various other iterations of the team, sometimes depicted as the team's leader, and a significant love interest for Dick Grayson.

Within the main continuity of the DC Universe, her origin is revealed to be Princess Koriand'r, an alien princess from the planet Tamaran and heiress to the throne until she was ousted in a coup by her elder sister, Komand'r (also known as Blackfire), who sold her into slavery. Subjected to torture and sexual exploitation, Koriand'r was also subjected to experiments performed by Psion scientists, which gave her additional powers. Escaping her captors, she found herself on Earth and befriended the Teen Titans, becoming a long-lasting member of the team. The character has appeared on several other teams, including the Outsiders, Outlaws, and Justice League Odyssey. While on Earth, the character has been depicted as a model under the alias Kory Anders, occasionally the leader of the Teen Titans, and was the principal of Teen Titans Academy during a period in which the Titans help trained future superheroes of the DC Universe.

Starfire has been featured in various media outside comic books. Within television, she is notably voiced by Hynden Walch in the animated series Teen Titans and Teen Titans Go!. Kari Wahlgren voices the character in the DC Animated Movie Universe, Injustice 2, and Lego DC Super-Villains.

== Publication history ==
Created by Marv Wolfman and George Pérez, Starfire first appeared in a in DC Comics Presents #26 (October 1980), in a preview story heralding a new incarnation of the Teen Titans that also introduced Cyborg and Raven. The new series, The New Teen Titans, debuted in November 1980, and the Teen Titans subsequently became DC Comics' most popular superhero team of its day. Wolfman named the character as a pun on the word coriander.

Pérez said of his design for Starfire:

...I figured based on the description, was Red Sonja in outer space, so she ended up having a visual cue from that. When Joe Orlando passed by and saw the character sketches he suggested that maybe her hair should be longer. That I took to the ninth degree and gave her the Mighty Mouse contrail.

== Fictional character biography ==
An early depiction of Starfire, from the cover of Tales of the New Teen Titans #4 (September 1982 DC Comics). Art by George Pérez (penciller).

Princess Koriand'r is a humanoid alien, born on the planet Tamaran, located in the Vega system as the second of three children. She and her brother Ryand'r are placed first in the line of succession after their older sister Komand'r is crippled by a childhood illness that leaves her unable to fly or absorb solar radiation. Shunned and embittered by Tamaran's society, Komand'r allies with the Citadel and helps them conquer Tamaran.

Koriand'r is enslaved for six years by the Citadel, surviving numerous incidents of sexual, physical, and mental abuse. She and Komand'r are then both abducted by the Psions, who experiment on them to determine the limits of their solar absorption. Both sisters gain the ability to project blasts of solar energy, referred to as "starbolts". Koriand'r escapes and eventually finds her way to Earth, where she gains the help of the Teen Titans.

=== New life on Earth and as a member of the Teen Titans ===
Starfire would join the new iteration of the Teen Titans with Robin, Wonder Girl, Kid Flash, Cyborg, Changeling and Raven. The first adventure she had with her teammates was battling against Grant Wilson aka the Ravager, the son of the mercenary Deathstroke, who was gifted enhanced abilities like his father due to the experiments by the terrorist organization H.I.V.E.. She would also aid the Titans by protecting the planet Earth and the dimension of Azarath from the demon Trigon and battling against various supervillains including the Fearsome Five, Brother Blood and the former members of the Brotherhood of Evil, Madame Rouge, and General Zahl.

As she became more comfortable among human society, Starfire took up a short-lived modeling career using the name "Kory Anders", which remained her teammates' affectionate nickname for her. Starfire was also romantically linked with Dick Grayson (aka Robin, later Nightwing) in various runs of Teen Titans.

In New Titans, Tamaran is attacked by the Psions, who destabilize the planet's core. Starfire's parents Myand'r and Luand'r manage to evacuate the planet before it is destroyed, but choose to remain behind in an attempt to defend Tamaran and are killed in the ensuing explosion.

=== Infinite Crisis and aftermath ===
In Infinite Crisis, Starfire is among the heroes who battle Alexander Luthor Jr. and stop him from destroying the multiverse. She is presumed dead but survives and is teleported to another planet alongside Animal Man and Adam Strange due to Luthor altering the Zeta Beams that would have returned them to Earth. After returning to Earth, the three heroes reunite on several occasions, including the limited series Countdown to Adventure and Rann–Thanagar War.

=== Justice League and R.E.B.E.L.S. ===
Following the dissolution of the current JLA after Blackest Night, Starfire is invited by Donna to join Kimiyo Hoshi's new Justice League. After a short time with the team, Starfire quit the team and left a note to Dick explaining why. She then returns to where Tamaran used to be, to find that it had mysteriously returned. It is revealed that Vril Dox has moved the planet Rann where Tamaran used to be. Starfire agrees to join Legion and enters into a relationship with Captain Comet. Tamaranean refugees led by Blackfire attack Rann, believing that since the planet was in Tamaran's orbit they had claim to it. Dox resolves the conflict by allowing the Tamaraneans to live on Rann's uninhabited southern continent.

=== Red Hood and the Outlaws ===
Starfire in The New 52: Red Hood and the Outlaws #1

In 2011, DC Comics cancelled all of their monthly titles and rebooted the DC Universe continuity with 52 new titles in an initiative dubbed The New 52. As part of the relaunch, Starfire became the cast member of the series Red Hood and the Outlaws. In the new continuity, the character appears to have a similar origin, though she is now a member of that titular group, in which Jason Todd (Red Hood) and Roy Harper (Arsenal) are her teammates. As in the previous continuity, she has a past relationship with Dick Grayson. One significant change to her backstory is that she was sold into slavery by her sister to save Tamaran from the Citadel. Another is that her ship, which crashed on a tropical island, appears to be her primary home, where she keeps a number of articles of Dick Grayson's clothing - which eventually serve to become part of Jason's Red Hood uniform.

It is soon revealed that Koriand'r is the commander of a spaceship named Starfire, the crew consisting of slaves she helped free when she herself escaped slavery. The Starfire has returned to earth for Kory because that Tamaran has been taken over by the Blight, a parasitic alien species. Starfire talks to Roy and Jason in private and explains that she and Komand'r, her sister, were always not on the best of terms, though they tried. This is mainly because Kory blames her sister and the people of Tamaran for her enslavement, so she is torn on if she should help them now. Roy is then kidnapped during an attack on the ship and taken to Tamaran, driving Starfire to go to her home planet. Eventually, Starfire decides she cannot leave her people and her sister helpless, so after they rescue Roy, the Outlaws and the crew of the Starfire help Blackfire take back Tamaran, and Kori reconciles with her sister.

=== Starfire ===
Starfire

Publication information
- Schedule: Monthly
- Format: Ongoing series
- Genre: Superhero
- Publication date: August 2015 – July 2016
- No. of issues: 12

Creative team
- Written by: Amanda Conner; Jimmy Palmiotti
- Penciller: Emanuela Lupacchino
- Inkers: Ray McCarthy (#1‐7); Sean Parsons (#7); Elsa Charretier (#8‐12)

In 2015, Starfire received a self-titled series in which she returns to Earth and moves to Key West. Additionally, she adopts Syl'Khee, a worm-like alien based on Silkie from the Teen Titans animated series. Having given up on heroism, she begins living a normal human life using her nickname of "Kori". She befriends the local sheriff, Stella Gomez, who helps her find a place to live and constantly dealt with Kori's naiveté regarding human culture. Kori also meets Stella's widowed brother, Sol (who happened to bear a striking resemblance to Dick Grayson), and later began dating him.

Starfire subsequently meets Atlee, a waitress who is secretly a super-powered woman from a civilization living below the Earth's surface. Despite no longer wanting be a hero, trouble continues to find Kori in her new home and she is forced to defend Key West from various threats.

== Character overview ==
=== Sexuality and culture ===
Tamaraneans are depicted as emotionally expressive people who view affection, nudity, and sexual intimacy without the taboos common to human society. Physical closeness, such as kissing, can also serve cultural and practical purposes rather than being strictly romantic (such as kissing to absorb language). Marriage in Tamaran, however, is shown to be a monogamous institution and is often arranged for political reasons. This cultural openness has sometimes brought Starfire into conflict with Earth's social norms, where her comfort with nudity or casual displays of affection may be misunderstood. Despite this leading to much online speculation over Starfire's personal sexual preferences, her canonical romantic relationships have been portrayed as heterosexual.

== Powers and abilities ==
Starfire is a Tamaranean whose physiology allows her to constantly absorb ultraviolet radiation. The radiation is converted to pure energy, allowing her to fly at supersonic speeds. Starfire is capable of using this power to fly in space, allowing her to be fast enough to cross several solar systems in minutes to seconds. This energy also gives her incredible superhuman strength and durability. After being experimented on by the Psions, Starfire gained the ability to release her absorbed energy into powerful blasts called "starbolts".

Starfire is also proficient in hand-to-hand combat, having been trained by the Warlords of Okaara. Her natural strength, combined with her fighting skills, allowed her to defeat the powerful Donna Troy about one out of three times during purely hand to hand matches. She later proved strong enough to fight against Wonder Woman for a short period of time and, during a fit of rage, was so strong that Donna was unable to contain her without the help of Mon-El.

As shown in the "Insiders" crossover story arc (Teen Titans and Outsiders), Starfire can also release nearly all of her stored energy as a powerful omni-directional explosive burst, many times stronger and more powerful than her standard blasts. The released energy leaves her in a weakened state. She is also able to absorb ambient ultraviolet energy consciously. Starfire demonstrated more control over her powers in the New 52 reboot, using her internal energy to melt the metal of Jason Todd's gun when it came into contact with her skin.

Starfire, like all Tamaraneans, is capable of assimilating languages through physical contact with another person. She also does not need to eat, drink, breathe, or sleep to survive unless she is low on ultraviolet energy.

== Other versions ==
Several alternate universe versions of Starfire have appeared throughout the character's publication history. Shatterstarfire, a composite character based on Starfire and Marvel Comics character Shatterstar, appears in the Amalgam Comics imprint. Star Canary, a composite character based on Starfire and Black Canary, appears in Superman/Batman #60. In Flashpoint, Starfire is a member of the Amazons' Furies until she is killed by Dick Grayson.

== Reception ==
Starfire placed 21st on IGN's 2013 list of the "Top 25 Heroes of DC Comics". She was also ranked 20th in Comics Buyer's Guide's "100 Sexiest Women in Comics" list. Comic Book Resources ranked Starfire 13th in their "The 20 Strongest Female Superheroes, Ranked" list,

== Collected editions ==
Title	Material collected	Publication date	Pages	ISBN
Red Hood and the Outlaws: The Starfire	Red Hood and the Outlaws Vol. 1 #8–14	July 2013	160	978-1401240905
Starfire: Welcome Home	DC Sneak Peek: Starfire #1, Starfire Vol. 2 #1–6	March 2016	159	978-1401261603
Starfire: A Matter of Time	Starfire Vol. 2 #7–12	January 2017	144	978-1401270384
I Am Not Starfire	Original material	July 2021	166	978-1779501264
Teen Titans: Starfire	Original material	November 2024	196	978-1779517999
Starfire by Amanda Conner and Jimmy Palmiotti: The Complete Collection	DC Sneak Peek: Starfire #1, Starfire Vol. 2 #1–12	January 2027	288	978-1799510697

== In other media ==
=== Television ===
Left to right: Starfire as depicted in Teen Titans (2003–2006), Starfire as depicted in Teen Titans Go! (2013–present), Anna Diop as Kory Anders/Starfire as depicted in Titans (2018–2023)
- Starfire appears in the 1984 Keebler PSA "New Teen Titans Say No to Drugs" as a member of the New Teen Titans.
- Starfire appears in Teen Titans (2003–2006), voiced by Hynden Walch. This version is a founding member of the eponymous Teen Titans who does not use contractions in her speech, possesses a limited grasp of Earth culture, and a tendency to misstate or misunderstand common idioms. Additionally, she displays initially unrequited romantic feelings for team leader Robin.
- Starfire appears in the "New Teen Titans" segment of DC Nation Shorts, voiced again by Hynden Walch. This version is a member of the Teen Titans.
- Starfire, based on the Teen Titans (2003) incarnation, appears in Teen Titans Go! (2013–present), voiced again by Hynden Walch. This version is a member of the Teen Titans who is oblivious to Robin's romantic feelings for her, seeing him instead as a brother. Additionally, the Teen Titans (2003) incarnation of Starfire appears in the episode "The Academy" via archival footage.
- Starfire makes a non-speaking cameo appearance in a DC Super Friends short.
- Starfire appears in Titans (2018–2023), portrayed by Anna Diop. This version was sent to Earth to kill Rachel Roth to prevent her from releasing Trigon, only to lose her memories following a car crash. While in this state, she joins forces with Dick Grayson and Gar Logan to protect Roth. Despite eventually regaining her memories, Starfire chooses to stay on Earth as a member of Grayson's Titans and help Roth control her powers.
  - Starfire makes a cameo appearance in "Crisis on Infinite Earths" via archival footage from the Titans episode "Titans".
- A young Starfire appears in the DC Super Hero Girls (2019) episode "#TweenTitans", voiced by Grey DeLisle.
- Starfire makes a cameo appearance in the Harley Quinn episode "Metamorphosis" via picture.
- Starfire is set to appear in her own upcoming series Starfire!

=== Film ===
- The Teen Titans (2003) incarnation of Starfire appears in Teen Titans: Trouble in Tokyo, voiced again by Hynden Walch. While helping the Titans combat Brushogun in Japan, she and Robin eventually become a couple.
- Starfire appears in Superman/Batman: Public Enemies, voiced by Jennifer Hale. This version works for President Lex Luthor.
- Starfire appears in films set in the DC Animated Movie Universe (DCAMU), voiced by Kari Wahlgren:
  - A picture of Starfire appears in Batman vs. Robin.
  - Starfire makes a cameo appearance in Batman: Bad Blood.
  - Starfire appears in Justice League vs. Teen Titans. Here, she becomes the leader of the Teen Titans following the departure of previous leader Dick Grayson.
  - Starfire appears in Teen Titans: The Judas Contract. While combating Deathstroke and Brother Blood, she experiences doubt over leading the Titans, though Grayson assures her he named her his successor for a good reason.
  - Starfire makes a non-speaking appearance in Justice League Dark: Apokolips War. She leads the Titans in defending Earth from Darkseid's Paradooms, only to be captured, brainwashed, and converted into a cyborg Fury before being freed two years later.
- Starfire appears in Lego DC Comics Super Heroes: Justice League – Gotham City Breakout, voiced again by Hynden Walch.
- Starfire appears in Teen Titans Go! To the Movies, voiced again by Hynden Walch.
- The Teen Titans Go! (2013) and Teen Titans (2003) incarnations of Starfire appear in Teen Titans Go! vs. Teen Titans, with both voiced again by Hynden Walch. Additionally, several alternate reality versions of Starfire appear throughout the film, such as her Tiny Titans, New Teen Titans comic, and DCAMU counterparts.
- The Teen Titans Go! (2013) incarnation of Starfire appears in Teen Titans Go! See Space Jam, voiced again by Hynden Walch.
- The Teen Titans Go! (2013) incarnation of Starfire appears in Teen Titans Go! & DC Super Hero Girls: Mayhem in the Multiverse, voiced again by Hynden Walch.
- Starfire appears in Justice League: Crisis on Infinite Earths.

=== Video games ===
- Starfire appears as a playable character in Teen Titans (2005), voiced again by Hynden Walch.
- Starfire appears as a playable character in Teen Titans (2006), voiced again by Hynden Walch.
- Starfire appears in DC Universe Online, voiced by Adriene Mishler.
- Starfire appears as a character summon in Scribblenauts Unmasked: A DC Comics Adventure.
- Starfire, based on the Teen Titans (2003) incarnation, appears as a playable character in Lego Batman 3: Beyond Gotham via the "Heroines vs Villainesses" DLC pack.
- Starfire appears as a downloadable playable character in Injustice 2, voiced again by Kari Wahlgren. This version is a member of the Teen Titans who died years prior.
- The Teen Titans Go! (2013) incarnation of Starfire appears as a playable character in Lego Dimensions, voiced again by Hynden Walch.
- Starfire appears as a playable character in Lego DC Super-Villains, voiced again by Kari Wahlgren.
- Starfire appears in Teeny Titans, voiced again by Hynden Walch.
- Starfire appears as a playable character in DC Unchained.
- Starfire appears as an alternate skin in Fortnite.

=== Miscellaneous ===
- The Teen Titans (2003) incarnation of Starfire appears in Teen Titans Go! (2004). In issue #46, it is revealed that she has a younger brother named Wildfire, who was sent off of Tamaran amidst a Gordanian invasion years prior. After Blackfire works with Madame Rouge to manipulate Starfire into believing Wildfire had returned, Starfire disowns Blackfire and vows to find Wildfire, viewing him as the only family she has left. Additionally, an evil, alternate universe variant of Starfire, also named Blackfire, appears in issue #48 as a member of the Teen Tyrants.
- Starfire appears in the Injustice: Gods Among Us prequel comic as a member of the Teen Titans.
- Starfire appears in DC Super Hero Girls (2015) and its tie-in films, voiced again by Hynden Walch. This version is a student and costume designer at Super Hero High School.
- Starfire appears in the Injustice 2 prequel comic as a member of the Teen Titans.

=== Merchandise ===
- Starfire received two figures from DC Direct, with the second being released as part of the "New Teen Titans" four-pack.
- Starfire received a figure in the DC Comics Super Hero Collection.
- Starfire appears in the Teen Titans trading card game.
- Starfire appears as a main character in the crossover miniseries DC x Sonic the Hedgehog: Metal Legion. In the first issue, Starfire and her fellow Titans join forces with Tails (who is wearing his "Cyborg" armor) and Blaze the Cat in defeating Brother Blood and H.I.V.E.. Starfire also exchanges a friendly conversation with Blaze, as they debate on trading outfits. Later in the third issue, Starfire and Blaze (who is now dressed like the former) are assembled by Catwoman and Rouge the Bat along with other heroes for a plan to stop Doctor Eggman and the Legion of Doom.
