= David Slack =

American television screenwriter and producer

David Slack is an American television writer and producer. He has written and/or produced on such shows as Law & Order, Lie to Me, In Plain Sight, Teen Titans, Hi Hi Puffy AmiYumi, Jackie Chan Adventures, Generator Rex, Transformers: Prime, and more recently, Person of Interest, A.P.B., and the 2016 reboot of MacGyver.

As of 2011, he is currently involved in producing and writing a new science fiction TV series for Syfy called Seeing Things.

In a 2012 interview with the Penmen Review, a Southern New Hampshire University newspaper, he explained that, when writing, he begins with the story, not the characters, and builds it along the way. Later that month, in another interview with givememyremote.com, he revealed how Person of Interest producers Greg Plageman and Jonathan Nolan "like to keep the audience guessing" and that the writers also "like to take the show in surprising places".

In 2019, Slack joined other WGA members in firing his agents as part of the guild's stand against the ATA and the practice of packaging.

== Screenwriting credits ==
=== Television ===
(series head writer denoted in bold)

- Jackie Chan Adventures (2000–2003)
- Max Steel (2001)
- Big Guy and Rusty the Boy Robot (2001)
- The Legend of Tarzan (2001)
- Baby Looney Tunes (2001–2002)
- What’s with Andy? (2002)
- Totally Spies! (2002–2004)
- Stuart Little (2003)
- **Teen Titans** (2003–2005)
- Hi Hi Puffy AmiYumi (2004–2005)
- The Batman (2005)
- Law & Order (2005–2008)
- Legion of Super Heroes (2007)
- Storm Hawks (2009)
- In Plain Sight (2009)

- The Forgotten (2009-2010)
- Pink Panther and Pals (2010)
- Lie to Me (2010–2011)
- Transformers: Prime (2011)
- Generator Rex (2011)
- Gravity Falls (2012)
- Person of Interest (2011–2015)
- MacGyver (2016–2018)
- APB (2017)
- Thunderbirds Are Go (2017)
- Magnum P.I. (2021–2022)

=== Film ===
- Teen Titans: Trouble in Tokyo (2006)
