= List of Teen Titans Go! episodes =

Teen Titans Go! is an American animated television series based on the DC Comics' superhero team, the Teen Titans, and DC Nation's New Teen Titans shorts, both of which are based on the 2003 Teen Titans TV series. Teen Titans Go! is a more comedic take on the DC Comics franchise, dealing with situations that happen every day. Sporting a different animation style, Teen Titans Go! serves as a comedic standalone spin-off with no continuity to the previous series, and only certain elements are retained. Many DC characters make cameo appearances and are referenced in the background. The original principal voice cast returns to reprise their respective roles.

As of September 12, 2026, 456 episodes of Teen Titans Go! have aired.

== Series overview ==
Season	Episodes	Originally released	
Season	Episodes	First released	Last released
1	52	April 23, 2013	June 5, 2014
2	52	June 12, 2014	July 30, 2015
3	53	July 31, 2015	October 13, 2016
4	52	October 20, 2016	June 25, 2018
5	52	June 25, 2018	April 4, 2020
6	52	October 4, 2019	May 1, 2021
7	52	January 8, 2021	September 16, 2022
8	42	October 7, 2022	November 30, 2024
9	52	March 1, 2025	November 28, 2026

== Episodes ==
=== Season 1 (2013–14) ===
No. overall	No. in season	Title (Note: Alternate titles are sourced from the United States Copyright Catalog and the Futon Critic.)	Directed by	Written by	Original release date	Prod. code	U.S. viewers (millions)
1	1	"Legendary Sandwich"	Luke Cormican	Aaron Horvath	April 23, 2013	1A	2.01
After being interrupted by the guys during a Pretty Pretty Pegasus marathon, Raven sends them, along with Starfire, on a dangerous mission to look for ingredients for a mystical sandwich of legend.
2	2	"Pie Bros"	Peter Rida Michail	Will Friedle	April 23, 2013	1B	2.01
Beast Boy takes a job at his favorite pie shop to buy Cyborg an expensive birthday gift, but it jeopardizes their friendship. While there, The Titans discover that the owner of the pie shop, Mother Mae-Eye, uses human beings in her pies.
3	3	"Driver's Ed"	Luke Cormican	Tab Murphy	April 30, 2013	2A	1.45
Robin takes up driver's ed after his license is suspended, but fails to realize that his instructor Ed is a bank robber using him as a getaway driver.
4	4	"Dog Hand"	Luke Cormican	Tom Pugsley	April 30, 2013	2B	1.45
Seeking to lure his daughter back to the dark side, Raven's father Trigon makes nice with her friends through granting them wishes discussing their "daddy issues". Fed up with this, Raven agrees to turn over to the dark side. Then when Trigon threatens the lives of the rest of the team, Raven reveals this to be a trick, angering Trigon. He then threatens to revoke Raven's powers. Raven, along with the rest of the team, fights against Trigon with the wishes that he granted them, defeating him.
5	5	"Double Trouble"	Scott O'Brien	Steve Borst	May 7, 2013	3A	1.59
Growing tired of Beast Boy's same old game, Cyborg tricks Raven into creating a magical double of himself to play with Beast Boy. Beast Boy and his magic double become friends, so Cyborg tricks Raven into creating a magical double of Beast Boy, and things go out of hand when the doubles become friends, and they learn how to create more magical doubles, and kick the original Titans out of the tower. They then figure out the original Beast Boy and Cyborg are clones themselves. Robin traces credit card purchases to an apartment where the original Cyborg and Beast Boy, now obese and only playing video games, reside. Knowing the tower would one day become overrun with clones, they created a device that sends the tower with all of the clones inside, to a distant planet in space and a new tower appears in its place.
6	6	"The Date"	Scott O'Brien	Sholly Fisch	May 7, 2013	3B	1.59
After mustering up enough courage to ask Starfire on a date, Robin finds his archrival Speedy has already arranged plans to go out with her. To get his revenge, Robin kidnaps and impersonates him to sabotage his date. Then Speedy, dressed as Robin, shows up at the restaurant and interrupts the date. He and Robin then battle, and Robin defeats Speedy. Robin changes back into his own clothes, and is about to go on his own date with Starfire, until he begins to fell guilty and confesses everything to her. This angers Starfire and causes her to punch Robin in the face.
7	7	"Dude Relax"	Peter Rida Michail	Amy Wolfram	May 14, 2013	4A	1.64
After Robin's high-strung nature begins to affect the team, they try to teach him to relax. This then backfires when the team actually needs Robin to defeat a monster, but he becomes too relaxed to fight and the team is defeated.
8	8	"Laundry Day"	Peter Rida Michail	Michael Jelenic	May 14, 2013	4B	1.64
After defeating a messy monster, the Titan's clothes become messy. The Titans bicker as to who is responsible for cleaning the Titans' tattered uniforms. Raven succumbs, and uses her magic to clean them, bringing them to life and against the Titans. The uniforms quickly defeat them, and Robin says that if they make it out alive, he will do the laundry for the next year. Raven uses a spell that stops the clothes, revealing that she tricked Robin into doing the laundry and that she cast a spell on the clothes to intentionally bring them to life.
9	9	"Ghostboy"	Scott O'Brien	Steve Borst	May 21, 2013	5A	1.84
Beast Boy has Starfire believe she has killed him in mosquito form, so he acts like a ghost to scare her. The Titans get back at him with one of Raven's spells to make Beast Boy think that he really is dead, but Beast Boy gets his revenge by jumping into a volcano-like mountain. Cyborg dies after getting ripped to shreds by a mountain lion, Robin dies after falling off a cliff, and Raven and Starfire both die after getting hit by lasers. Beast Boy nearly jumps and mocks the other Titans for being gullible and he was not going to jump, the other Titans (including Starfire) are angry at Beast Boy, who accidentally falls into the volcano (killing him offscreen). The episode ends with the Titans laughing at Beast Boy's comeuppance, then Cyborg saying "So what now?".
10	10	"La Larva de Amor"	Peter Rida Michail	Amy Wolfram	May 28, 2013	5B	1.84
When the other Titans are given the task of babysitting Silkie, he escapes to Mexico in romantic pursuit of a Mexican woman named Sonia and her evil and jealous lover Carlos.
11	11	"Hey Pizza!"	Luke Cormican	Amy Wolfram	June 4, 2013	6A	1.83
Beast Boy and Cyborg try to get free pizza by slowing down the delivery boy, but constantly fail to get the pizza to Titans Tower in over 30 minutes; meanwhile, Robin is torn between building a pool or a senior center.
12	12	"Gorilla"	Scott O'Brien	Steve Borst	June 11, 2013	6B	1.98
Beast Boy takes over the Titans after not changing out of his gorilla form. Robin trains with Cyborg to take back leadership.
13	13	"Girl's Night Out"	Peter Rida Michail	Amy Wolfram	June 18, 2013	7A	1.55
Starfire and Raven invite Jinx for a girls' night out when the other Titans go out on a guys' night out, but while doing so, they cause hijinks throughout the city.
14	14	"You're Fired!"	Luke Cormican	Steve Borst	June 25, 2013	7B	1.56
When Beast Boy is fired from the team, the Titans look for new members to join, and select Zan and Jayna, the Wonder Twins. Being useless to the team and hired as a receptionist, Beast Boy assists Zan in sabotaging Jayna.
15	15	"Super Robin"	Peter Rida Michail	Adam Stein	July 2, 2013	8A	1.74
Robin wants superpowers as he is the only one without them, but Raven tells him that powers are a curse.
16	16	"Tower Power"	Scott O'Brien	Adam Beechen	July 9, 2013	8B	1.75
Cyborg thinks being a robot is the best, but when he short-circuits, the Titans cannot put him back together, so they connect him to the tower computer, with unexpected results.
17	17	"Parasite"	Luke Cormican	Story by : Tab Murphy; Teleplay by : Tab Murphy & Aaron Horvath	July 16, 2013	9A	1.77
Starfire gets a space parasite who she names Perry and talks to through brain waves. The Titans become fond of it, but Robin suspects that it is evil. Robin then realizes that it is not evil after befriending Perry, but it morphs into a spider alien who crushes the Titans.
18	18	"Starliar"	Scott O'Brien	Steve Borst	July 23, 2013	9B	1.85
Starfire is the only one invited to the Titans East party because of the other Titans' immaturity, so Beast Boy teaches her to lie so that she will not upset the others, with a disastrous results.
19	19	"Meatball Party"	Peter Rida Michail	Paul Giacoppo	July 30, 2013	10A	1.54
Eating a meatball mixed with metal components cracks Raven's tooth and unleashes a tentacled demon from her mouth whenever it opens.
20	20	"Staff Meeting"	Luke Cormican	Michael Ryan	August 13, 2013	10B	1.52
The Titans' accidentally break Robin's staff, which he is very fond of, so he attempts to find a better one at the Universe Tree.
21	21	"Terra-ized"	Luke Cormican	Eric Rogers	August 20, 2013	11A	1.87
Terra has the other Titans believe that she is Beast Boy's girlfriend, but Raven is suspicious of her every move. The other Titans think that she is just jealous.
22	22	"Artful Dodgers"	Luke Cormican	J. M. DeMatteis	August 27, 2013	11B	1.80
The Titans spend too much time practicing a victory dance for their dodgeball match against the H.I.V.E., and do not practice the game, so for the finals, they plan to cheat.
23	23	"Burger vs. Burrito"	Peter Rida Michail	John Loy	September 3, 2013	12A	1.70
Beast Boy and Cyborg find out they have a different favorite food, so they battle it out to see which is superior: the burger or the burrito.
24	24	"Matched"	Luke Cormican	Steve Borst	September 11, 2013	12B	1.44
Cyborg has a Love Matcher 5000 program that ends up pairing Raven with Beast Boy and Starfire with Aquaman. While Beast Boy does everything he knows how to do, Robin can only hope that being more like Aquaman could win Starfire's heart.
25	25	"Colors of Raven"	Peter Rida Michail	Amy Wolfram	September 18, 2013	13A	1.68
When a crystal prism stolen from Dr. Light breaks in front of Raven, she is split into five versions of herself and the rest of the Titans must find her copies, trap them in the fragments of the prism, and put her back together.
26	26	"The Left Leg"	Peter Rida Michail	John Loy	September 25, 2013	13B	1.71
Cyborg builds a robot for all the Titans to use in dangerous situations, but Robin is relegated to the left leg, so he decides to make it the best body part it can be.
27	27	"Books"	Peter Rida Michail	John Loy	October 2, 2013	14A	1.59
Raven shows the Titans the joy of reading books, which they come to love a lot. When they cannot find any more books, they stumble across an evil and ancient magic book that can make all of their imaginations come to life. Once "turning off" their imaginations, Raven destroys the evil book once and for all.
28	28	"Lazy Sunday"	Peter Rida Michail	John Loy	October 9, 2013	14B	1.58
Robin gives the Titans' couch to charity as he is tired of Cyborg and Beast Boy's Lazy Sundays, thus sending them through grief. Meanwhile, Robin installs a treadmill into the place of the couch, and makes Beast Boy and Cyborg take up a life of fitness.
29	29	"Starfire the Terrible"	Peter Rida Michail	Steve Borst	October 16, 2013	15A	1.55
Robin is upset that he has no arch-nemesis, so Starfire comes to save-or ruin-the day.
30	30	"Power Moves"	Luke Cormican	Merrill Hagan	October 23, 2013	16A	1.62
Cyborg and Beast Boy combine their powers to make "power moves". When Robin and Cyborg accidentally make one, Beast Boy gets jealous when they start doing power moves together.
31	31	"Staring at the Future"	Scott O'Brien	John Loy	October 30, 2013	16B	1.25
When Cyborg and Beast Boy end up 30 years into the future in a long staring contest, they find out that Robin, Starfire, and Raven have taken up bigger responsibilities as adults.
32	32	"No Power"	Luke Cormican	Story by : J. M. DeMatteis & Jeff Mednikow; Teleplay by : J. M. DeMatteis	November 6, 2013	17A	1.44
Robin sets the Titans on a challenge to use no super-powers for 24 hours, to prove to them how hard that no powers can be.
33	33	"Sidekick"	Scott O'Brien	Amy Wolfram	November 13, 2013	17B	1.73
Batman assigns Robin to look after the Batcave while he is gone. The Titans come too, but mess everything up.
34	34	"Caged Tiger"	Peter Rida Michail	John Loy	November 20, 2013	18A	1.68
Robin, Cyborg and Beast Boy get trapped in the elevator and get cabin fever, while Raven and Starfire meet Dr. Light and find out that he is not so bad after all.
35	35	"Second Christmas"	Peter Rida Michail	Amy Wolfram	December 4, 2013	15B	1.43
The Titans are excited about Christmas, but when it ends they fool Starfire into throwing a second one.
36	36	"Nose Mouth"	Scott O'Brien	Tom Pugsley	January 8, 2014	18B	1.62
After Robin keeps everybody awake one night because of his sleep-fighting, the Titans think that Raven's spells could help around the Tower. When Raven finally does, she becomes more evil, just as she feared that she would.
37	37	"Legs"	Luke Cormican	John Loy	January 15, 2014	19A	1.62
When Robin steals Raven's cloak, the Titans find out that she is a better person without it. Raven later leaves the Titans, but comes back when things get out of control with her cloak after Cyborg ends up wearing it.
38	38	"Breakfast Cheese"	Scott O'Brien	James Krieg	January 22, 2014	19B	1.57
Starfire tries teaching the Titans to want to be hippies and they try to use peace and love to defeat their adversaries.
39	39	"Waffles"	Luke Cormican	John Loy	February 5, 2014	20A	1.76
Robin and the Titans become annoyed when Beast Boy and Cyborg will only say the word "waffles".
40	40	"Be Mine"	Peter Rida Michail	John Loy	February 12, 2014	21B	2.01
Terra seeks revenge against the Titans, particularly Beast Boy, during a Valentine's Day dance at Titans Tower.
41	41	"Opposites"	Scott O'Brien	Steve Borst	February 19, 2014	20B	1.87
Cyborg falls in love with Jinx and both try to keep it a secret from the Titans and the H.I.V.E.
42	42	"Birds"	Luke Cormican	Story by : Sean Kreiner, Jeff Mednikow & Dave Stone; Teleplay by : Sean Kreiner, Jeff Mednikow, Dave Stone & John Loy	February 26, 2014	21A	1.77
Robin accidentally mutates mocking birds with birdicide, which soon take over the tower.
43	43	"Brain Food"	Aaron Horvath & Scott O'Brien	John Loy	March 5, 2014	22A	1.86
Beast Boy wants to be smarter than the others, so he uses Raven's spell book to make the Titans dumber than him, but as a meteor heads for Earth, it is up to Silkie to save the world.
44	44	"In and Out"	Aaron Horvath	John Loy	March 12, 2014	22B	1.74
Robin insists that he must go in disguise as a villain named Red X to blow up the H.I.V.E. Tower, but he finds out that some things are just too good to be destroyed and the rest of the Titans follow.
45	45	"Little Buddies"	Luke Cormican	John Loy	March 19, 2014	23A	1.64
Cyborg befriends Pain Bot and decides to keep him as a "little buddy".
46	46	"Missing"	Luke Cormican	Amy Wolfram	March 26, 2014	23B	1.67
Robin, Beast Boy and Cyborg return Silkie to Killer Moth in favor of a cash reward, while Raven tries convincing Starfire that Silkie was incapable of loving her.
47	47	"Uncle Jokes"	Luke Cormican	John Loy	April 9, 2014	24A	1.25
Beast Boy and Cyborg invite Starfire to join their entourage, as long as she avoids annoying "uncle jokes". Robin ends up freaking out over the team's balance when Starfire joins in.
48	48	"Más y Menos"	Peter Rida Michail	John Loy	April 16, 2014	24B	1.66
Robin tries teaching two super-speedy Guatemalan brothers named Más y Menos how to become heroes, or rather to become like him, but the other Titans distract him from his "lessons".
49	49	"Dreams"	Peter Rida Michail	Guy Stevenson	April 23, 2014	25A	1.84
The dreams of the Titans are revealed. The episode includes clips from "Titans East Part 1" and Teen Titans: Trouble in Tokyo.
50	50	"Grandma Voice"	Scott O'Brien	John Loy	April 30, 2014	25B	1.52
Cyborg starts speaking in the voice of his grandmother, which the Titans think is funny, but it proves to be more annoying as the days go by.: Special guest star: Roz Ryan as Cyborg's Grandma Voice
51	51	"Real Magic"	Aaron Horvath	Amy Wolfram	May 14, 2014	26A	1.50
Raven tries to stop Robin from performing "terrible" magic tricks, because of being summoned by the magic god.
52	52	"Puppets, Whaaaaat?"	Luke Cormican	John Loy	June 5, 2014	26B	1.99
After Robin gets mad at the team, he makes a deal with the evil Puppet Wizard.

=== Season 2 (2014–15) ===
No. overall	No. in season	Title	Directed by	Written by	Original release date	Prod. code	U.S. viewers (millions)
53	1	"Mr. Butt"	Luke Cormican	John Loy	June 12, 2014	27A	1.76
Starfire is again set up by her scheming elder sister, Blackfire, and put in galactic jail in her stead. As she outrageously plots revenge, the other Titans' help make Blackfire a better sister by sending her to "Sister School".
54	2	"Man Person"	Luke Cormican	Merrill Hagan	June 19, 2014	27B	1.84
Beast Boy starts replacing body parts with robotic limbs to make him look tough. Calling himself "Scar Man", it causes Raven to have a crush on him.
55	3	"Pirates"	Luke Cormican	Adam Tierney	June 26, 2014	28A	2.18
Beast Boy becomes wildly jealous of Aqualad when he and Raven begin to fall for each other, while Cyborg gets the obsessive idea in his head that Aqualad must be a pirate.
56	4	"Money Grandma"	Luke Cormican	Merrill Hagan	July 3, 2014	33B	1.96
After Robin begins Team Leader Elections for the Titans and hoping to win again, Raven brings back George Washington from the past to show Robin what being a true leader is really all about.
57	5	"I See You!"	Peter Rida Michail	Merrill Hagan	July 24, 2014	28B	1.95
Robin and Starfire go on a stakeout, but it is really an excuse for her to kiss him. Meanwhile, Beast Boy and Cyborg try stakeouts with Raven's dark secret as well.
58	6	"Brian"	Peter Rida Michail	John Loy	July 31, 2014	29A	1.96
When the Titans are captured by the Brain, it is up to Birdarang and the other little buddies to save them.
59	7	"Nature"	Peter Rida Michail	Merrill Hagan	August 7, 2014	29B	2.12
Beast Boy claims to have lost his "wild side" after losing the ability to change into animals.
60	8	"Salty Codgers"	Peter Rida Michail	John Loy	August 14, 2014	30A	1.69
Mad Mod turns the Titans into old people, who are Raven's favorite type of people. After they have died, Raven goes to the Underworld to see Death himself (who happens to be her paternal uncle) to force him to return her friends' spirits.
61	9	"Knowledge"	Luke Cormican	Justin Becker	August 21, 2014	30B	1.85
Raven gives Starfire a mystical charm that gives her unlimited Earth knowledge, but in the process, she becomes a nuisance.
62	10	"Slumber Party"	Peter Rida Michail	Ben Joseph	August 28, 2014	35B	1.72
The Titans host a slumber party to get rid of Cyborg's fear of the dark, summoning the mirror spirit "Scary Teri".: Note: This episode introduces Cyborg's favorite song, "The Night Begins to Shine".
63	11	"Love Monsters"	Peter Rida Michail	Ben Joseph	September 4, 2014	31A	2.27
Raven warns the Titans not to go near a box that contains the Twin Destroyers of Azarath. Starfire opens it and loves the Destroyers, but all kinds of love and affection is what makes them even stronger.
64	12	"Baby Hands"	Luke Cormican	Amy Wolfram	September 11, 2014	31B	2.20
Brother Blood erases the memories of Raven, Cyborg, Starfire and Beast Boy so that they will each not remember being a Titan. This thrills Robin, because he then retrains the team in his own style.
65	13	"Caramel Apples"	Luke Cormican	John Loy	September 18, 2014	32A	1.92
Trigon wants to destroy Earth because Raven did not get him anything for Father's Day. Starfire spends time with Trigon because she did not have a fatherly relationship with her own father, M'yandr.
66	14	"Sandwich Thief"	Peter Rida Michail	Ben Joseph	September 25, 2014	33A	2.46
Robin hunts for the person who stole his "perfect" sandwich.
67	15	"Friendship"	Luke Cormican	Merrill Hagan	October 2, 2014	34A	1.98
Control Freak traps the Titans in the TV show "Pretty Pretty Pegasus" and they must find a way out.
68	16	"Vegetables"	Peter Rida Michail	Ben Joseph	October 9, 2014	34B	2.10
The Titans become vegetarians, but not everyone is meant for it.
69	17	"The Mask"	Luke Cormican	Story by : Miles Hindman & Derek Iversen; Teleplay by : J. M. DeMatteis	October 16, 2014	35A	2.71
Robin's mask hides a terrible secret, not just his secret identity.
70	18	"Serious Business"	Peter Rida Michail	John Loy	October 23, 2014	36A	1.83
The Titans find out the purpose for a bathroom.
71	19	"Halloween"	Peter Rida Michail	John Loy	October 30, 2014	32B	1.80
Raven tries to put the spirit back into Halloween.
72	20	"Boys vs. Girls"	Jeff Mednikow	John Loy	November 6, 2014	37A	2.01
After Robin, Beast Boy, and Cyborg make sexist statements to Raven and Starfire, the team makes a competition to determine if boys or girls are better. When the girls win and Beast Boy and Cyborg choose to act like girls, Robin tries to prove that boys are better by giving Raven and Starfire cooties.
73	21	"Body Adventure"	Luke Cormican	Ben Joseph	November 13, 2014	37B	1.87
When Cyborg gets sick, Robin becomes small so that he can fight the infection and the Titans go to help.
74	22	"Road Trip"	Peter Rida Michail	Marly Halpern Glaser	November 20, 2014	38A	1.83
Cyborg takes the Titans on a road trip.
75	23	"Thanksgiving"	Luke Cormican	Ben Joseph	November 26, 2014	36B	2.81
Robin tries to impress Batman by hosting the perfect Thanksgiving dinner. Meanwhile, Raven's father Trigon joined in as he mentioned twice in his appearance.
76	24	"The Best Robin"	Jeff Mednikow	Ben Joseph	December 4, 2014	38B	2.17
Due to the Titans' laziness, Robin creates another team of himself to battle Brother Blood.
77	25	"Mouth Hole"	Jeff Mednikow	Merrill Hagan	January 8, 2015	39A	2.42
Robin goes on a quest to gain a new power: whistling.
78	26	"Hot Garbage"	Luke Cormican	John Loy	January 15, 2015	39B	1.73
When the Titans try to get Beast Boy to clean his dirty room, they discover that there is more to garbage than just trash.
79	27	"Robin Backwards"	Luke Cormican	Caldwell Tanner	January 22, 2015	40A	2.15
Nibor, the Bizarro World's Robin, arrives in Jump City, and the Titans decide that they should probably keep an eye on him. Robin tries to express his "rules", but Nibor does the opposite of what he is told, and the other Titans follow in unison. After an unsuccessful time, Robin joins the Bizarro Titans.
80	28	"Crazy Day"	Jeff Mednikow	John Loy	January 29, 2015	40B	2.11
It is Crazy Day again, and Raven must do her best to avoid being driven completely crazy by the other Titans, while dealing with a major headache.
81	29	"Smile Bones"	Peter Rida Michail	Marly Halpern Glaser	February 5, 2015	41A	2.22
Cyborg and Beast Boy develop a habit of wolfing down their food without savoring it like the other Titans do. This becomes problematic in the form of giant stomach monsters.
82	30	"Real Boy Adventures"	Peter Rida Michail	Ben Joseph	February 12, 2015	41B	1.98
After transforming into "Fleshy Guy", Cyborg discovers the ups and downs of being human.
83	31	"Hose Water"	Jeff Mednikow	Ben Gruber	February 19, 2015	42B	2.30
The discovery of a baby bird fuels Starfire and Cyborg to discover that their inner children have been awakened.
84	32	"Let's Get Serious"	Peter Rida Michail	Michael Jelenic & Aaron Horvath	February 26, 2015	43A	2.33
After the Young Justice heroes easily take out the H.I.V.E. Five while the Teen Titans make silly jokes, Robin makes the team become more serious, hoping to unite the team. It works, and the Titans' personalities are changed drastically.
85	33	"Tamaranian Vacation"	Luke Cormican	Amy Wolfram	March 5, 2015	43B	2.22
The Titans visit Starfire's home world of Tamaran to try to learn what makes her so sweet and loving, but Tamaran is not exactly what it seems, and they find out the reason for Starfire's boundless optimism.
86	34	"Rocks and Water"	Luke Cormican	Ben Joseph	March 12, 2015	44A	1.97
Raven and Beast Boy are surprised to discover that their ex-sweethearts, Terra and Aqualad, are dating. Raven and Beast Boy pair up and double date with their ex-couple to make them jealous, while Robin tries to get closer to Starfire with Cyborg being the third wheel.
87	35	"Multiple Trick Pony"	James Krenzke	Ben Joseph	March 19, 2015	44B	1.89
Robin insists that he is a "Multiple Trick Pony" when Kid Flash shows him up with his speed.
88	36	"Truth, Justice, and What?"	Peter Rida Michail	Michael Jelenic & Aaron Horvath	March 26, 2015	45A	1.85
When the other Titans become extremely addicted to pizza, Robin orders a ban of it to set things right, but once he realizes the folly of his idea, the Titans must contend with the Teenage Mutant Ninja Turtles to return to their old ways.
89	37	"Two Bumble Bees and a Wasp"	Luke Cormican	Ben Gruber	April 2, 2015	46A	1.95
When Robin tries to teach the others to have more respect for money, he ends up learning a lesson himself.
90	38	"Oil Drums"	Peter Rida Michail	Michael Jelenic & Aaron Horvath	April 9, 2015	46B	2.23
Cyborg is looking forward to a marathon of watching The A-Team, but the remote appears to be lost.
91	39	"Video Game References"	Luke Cormican	Michael Jelenic & Aaron Horvath	April 16, 2015	47A	1.80
The Titans immerse themselves in different video game worlds.
92	40	"Cool School"	Peter Rida Michail	Story by : Josephine Campbell; Teleplay by : Michael Jelenic & Aaron Horvath	April 23, 2015	47B	2.02
Rose Wilson escapes from prison, defeating the Titans with cool one-liners. Only Raven is immune to Rose's insults, and the two decide to hang out and do cool stuff together. Meanwhile, Cyborg, Starfire and Beast Boy feel lame by comparison, so they go to Cool School. Robin, however, goes off on a tirade and constantly stalks the two until Rose is once again imprisoned.
93	41	"Kicking a Ball and Pretending to Be Hurt"	James Krenzke	Michael Jelenic & Aaron Horvath	April 30, 2015	48A	1.75
Robin teaches the Titans how to play soccer. They quickly become obsessed, and accidentally uncover the secret reason why the sport is so popular.
94	42	"Head Fruit"	James Krenzke	Michael Jelenic & Aaron Horvath	May 7, 2015	48B	2.15
When Beast Boy's head starts to rattle, Robin suggests that he should find a hobby so that his brain will stop shrinking. Beast Boy and his brain agree to take up gardening.
95	43	"Yearbook Madness"	Jeff Mednikow	Merrill Hagan	May 14, 2015	42A	1.56
Beast Boy and Cyborg decide to create a yearbook for the Titans, and Robin goes crazy trying to become the most popular Titan.
96	44	"Beast Man"	Luke Cormican	Caldwell Tanner	June 29, 2015	45B	2.28
Beast Boy discovers that he can use his abilities to turn himself into an adult. The Titans' take advantage of this to go to the movies to see Death Toilet III and other things that require parental guidance.
97	45	"Operation Tin Man"	Luke Cormican	Merrill Hagan	June 30, 2015	49A	2.30
Cyborg spends time with Jinx and befriends Gizmo while the rest of the team tries to rescue him.
98	46	"Nean"	Peter Rida Michail	Ben Gruber	July 1, 2015	49B	2.27
Trigon, Raven's father, hears about her "nean" word, but insists that she should be mean. Afterwards, he casts a curse on her so that Raven can only be nice. Meanwhile, Starfire is going to marry a pot of chili, but Robin is jealous.
99	47	"Campfire Stories"	Peter Rida Michail	Michael Jelenic & Aaron Horvath	July 2, 2015	50A	2.22
While camping, Robin suggests to the others that they all tell a scary campfire story.
100	48	"And the Award for Sound Design Goes to Rob"	Peter Rida Michail	Michael Jelenic & Aaron Horvath	July 3, 2015	52A	2.35
Raven makes a deal with the Whisperer to remove all sound.
101	49	"The H.I.V.E. Five"	Luke Cormican	Michael Jelenic & Aaron Horvath	July 27, 2015	50B	2.04
The H.I.V.E. Five are sick of the Titans' always beating them, so they decide to take a day off and stay as far from the Teen Titans as possible if they can.
102	50	"The Return of Slade"	Luke Cormican	Michael Jelenic & Aaron Horvath	July 28, 2015	51A	2.15
After defeating their most devious of enemies, Slade, Cyborg and Beast bring a clown to party which terrifies Starfire. They modify the clown and he goes off on a rampage, tainting kids' entertainment everywhere.
103	51	"More of the Same"	James Krenzke	Michael Jelenic & Aaron Horvath	July 29, 2015	51B	2.26
It is New Year's Eve, and the Titans' are trying to master all of the traditions to make sure they have a good new year.
104	52	"Some of Their Parts"	James Krenzke	Adam Tierney	July 30, 2015	52B	2.08
Robin uses the prism from "Colors of Raven" to split the others into their core personalities (despite saying that they are greater than some of their parts) so he can make the world's best fighting team. Robin however becomes selfish and divides himself into his personalities, finding that he has no good personality and Silkie's emoticlones must defeat him.

=== Season 3 (2015–16) ===
No. overall	No. in season	Title	Directed by	Written by	Original release date	Prod. code	U.S. viewers (millions)
105	1	"Cat's Fancy"	Peter Rida Michail	Ben Gruber	July 31, 2015	105	2.10
When Starfire expresses her intense and close affection only to a cat, Robin realizes that the only way Starfire will ever love him is if he turns into a cat. Later, Starfire becomes a cat lady and Beast Boy thinks that turning into a cat is a bad idea.
106	2	"Leg Day"	Luke Cormican	Ben Gruber	August 6, 2015	106	1.65
After being defeated due to very poor leg strength, Raven and the Titans try to strengthen their legs by becoming the League of Legs.
107	3	"Dignity of Teeth"	Noel Belknap	Ben Gruber	August 13, 2015	107	1.83
Beast Boy gets a wad of cash from the mythical Tooth Fairy against Raven's advice, which results in the other Titans' knocking their own teeth out for a chance to get money.
108	4	"Croissant"	Noel Belknap	Ben Gruber	August 20, 2015	108	1.76
A mysterious cocoon is ready to hatch and Beast Boy is nowhere to be found.
109	5	"Spice Game"	Luke Cormican	Caldwell Tanner	August 27, 2015	109	1.46
Tired of Robin's bland cooking, the other four Titans' work on making their favorite foods spicier, but later on the foods give them hot breath in the end.
110	6	"I'm the Sauce"	Bryan Newton	Caldwell Tanner	September 3, 2015	110	1.50
Stuck inside because of bad weather, the Titans play rainy day games after Robin convinces them that indoor activities will cheer up the clouds and make the rain stop.
111	7	"Hey You, Don't Forget About Me in Your Memory"	Luke Cormican	Ben Gruber	September 10, 2015	112	1.51
Robin must return to school with help from the Titans to become an All-American class student.
112	8	"Accept the Next Proposition You Hear"	Bryan Newton	Caldwell Tanner	October 19, 2015	111	1.68
Robin refuses to give the Titans any more orders so that they will learn to think for themselves. Instead, the Titans start taking cues from fortune cookies.
113	9	"The Fourth Wall"	Peter Rida Michail	Michael Jelenic & Aaron Horvath	October 20, 2015	113	1.49
Control Freak informs the Titans that they are on a TV show that he created and demands that they earn him an award or he will reboot them.
114	10	"40%, 40%, 20%"	Peter Rida Michail	Ben Gruber	October 21, 2015	114	1.53
Cyborg's real strength comes not from his robot parts, but from his favorite song "The Night Begins to Shine".
115	11	"Grube's Fairytales"	Noel Belknap	Ben Gruber	October 22, 2015	115	1.54
Robin tries to teach the Titans valuable life lessons by reading them fairy tales, but the others co-opt his stories and spin them into their own twisted yarns.
116	12	"A Farce"	Bryan Newton	Ben Gruber	October 23, 2015	116	1.42
Brother Blood takes the Titans to trial for their recent destruction of Jump City.
117	13	"Scary Figure Dance"	Luke Cormican	Ben Joseph	October 29, 2015	118	1.59
The Titans' Halloween party is interrupted by the H.I.V.E. Five robbing a candy factory.
118	14	"Animals, It's Just a Word!"	Noel Belknap	Ben Gruber	November 5, 2015	117	1.53
Beast Boy presses the Fire button on Cyborg's laser cannon, accidentally "killing" the other Titans. Using a transfusion of his own blood, Beast Boy not only brings the Titans back to life, but also enables them to transform into (and behave like) animals.
119	15	"BBBDAY!"	Bryan Newton	Ben Gruber	November 12, 2015	119	1.81
It is Beast Boy's Birthday, but the others did not celebrate. As a result, the universe does not know his age and it is changing him rapidly. The only way to celebrate is at the center of the universe.
120	16	"Black Friday"	Peter Rida Michail	Ben Gruber	November 19, 2015	120	1.48
Starfire does not know the meaning of Black Friday.
121	17	"Two Parter"	Noel Belknap	Michael Jelenic, Aaron Horvath & Ben Gruber	November 25, 2015	122	2.13
122	18	"Two Parter"	Luke Cormican	Michael Jelenic, Aaron Horvath & Ben Gruber	November 25, 2015	123	2.13
In Part One, the Titans visit the Hall of Justice to use the pool, but then decided to check out the inside. In Part Two, the Titans must save the members of the Justice League from the clutches of the supervillain Darkseid.: Special guest star: "Weird Al" Yankovic as Darkseid
123	19	"The True Meaning of Christmas"	Peter Rida Michail	Ben Gruber	December 3, 2015	124	1.50
Fed up with never getting presents from Santa Claus, the Titans head to the North Pole to take themselves off the Naughty List, by any means necessary.
124	20	"Squash & Stretch"	Bryan Newton	Ben Gruber	January 7, 2016	121	1.32
The Titans learn about cartoon-style violence to get revenge on a snack-stealing squirrel.
125	21	"Garage Sale"	Luke Cormican	Paul Giacoppo	January 14, 2016	125	1.16
Robin makes the other Titans sell their treasured mementos from past episodes.
126	22	"Secret Garden"	Bryan Newton	Ben Gruber	January 21, 2016	127	1.45
Cyborg is building stress up, to the point where he directs his built-up rage onto the other Titans. To help calm him down, Starfire takes Cyborg into her secret garden.
127	23	"The Cruel Giggling Ghoul"	Luke Cormican	Ben Gruber	February 11, 2016	128	1.34
The Titans go to the Wacka Doodles Amusement Park to watch LeBron James, but no one is there. The Titans find out what is going on. The episode is a parody of The New Scooby-Doo Movies.: Special guest star: LeBron James as himself
128	24	"How 'Bout Some Effort"	Luke Cormican	Ben Gruber	February 15, 2016	129	1.89
It is Valentine's Day and Cyborg goes to great lengths to make it special for his girlfriend Jinx.
129	25	"Pyramid Scheme"	Peter Rida Michail	Caldwell Tanner	February 15, 2016	131	1.89
Beast Boy makes lots of money due to a pyramid scheme and convinces the other Titans to join in.
130	26	"Beast Boy's St. Patrick's Day Luck, and It's Bad"	Noel Belknap	Ben Gruber	March 17, 2016	126	1.71
The Titans become cursed on St. Patrick's Day, with the exception of Beast Boy, and must retrieve the cure from the end of the rainbow, only to find out that Robin is transforming himself into a leprechaun.
131	27	"The Teen Titans Go Easter Holiday Classic"	Luke Cormican	Ben Gruber	March 25, 2016	137	1.14
The Easter Bunny is missing, so the Titans go and search for him before Easter is ruined.
132	28	"Batman v Teen Titans: Dark Injustice"	Bryan Newton	Ben Gruber	March 28, 2016	135	1.37
The Titans prank each other on April Fools' Day, but it starts to get out of hand. Raven tries to convince the humiliating jokes on April Fool's Day to stop.
133	29	"Bottle Episode"	Bryan Newton	Aaron Horvath	April 21, 2016	130	1.38
The Titans are trapped in a giant bottle in their living room and spend their time reminiscing.
134	30	"Finally a Lesson"	Peter Rida Michail	Michael Jelenic & Aaron Horvath	April 28, 2016	132	1.48
The gang learns a valuable lesson from Robin about home investment.
135	31	"Arms Race with Legs"	Noel Belknap	Ben Gruber	May 5, 2016	133	1.17
Raven as Lady Legasus must help the League of Legs.
136	32	"Obinray"	Noel Belknap	Ben Gruber	May 12, 2016	134	1.36
The Titans start speaking Pig Latin to prevent Robin from eavesdropping.
137	33	"Wally T"	Luke Cormican	Ben Gruber	May 19, 2016	136	1.24
The Titans have a surprise visit from a fan named Wally T.
138	34	"Rad Dudes with Bad Tudes"	Noel Belknap	Ben Gruber	May 26, 2016	138	1.27
After seeing a pair of cool dudes on roller blades, Robin tries to be just like them.
139	35	"Operation Dude Rescue"	Noel Belknap	Ben Gruber	May 30, 2016	143	1.36
140	36	"Operation Dude Rescue"	Peter Rida Michail	Ben Gruber	May 30, 2016	144	1.36
The male Titans are captured and Raven and Starfire try to rescue them, then the female Titans unite to rescue the male Titans from the Brain. To do so, they enlist the assistance of Rose Wilson, Jinx, and Terra.
141	37	"History Lesson"	Aaron Horvath	Ben Gruber	June 9, 2016	139	1.29
Robin tries to teach the other Titans valuable history lessons, but the others turn his stories into their own twisted yarns.
142	38	"The Art of Ninjutsu"	Luke Cormican	Ben Gruber	June 16, 2016	140	1.52
The other Titans train Beast Boy in the ways of the ninja.
143	39	"Think About Your Future"	Noel Belknap	Michael Jelenic & Aaron Horvath	June 23, 2016	141	1.41
The Titans are reckless with their money and health, much to the detriment of their future selves.
144	40	"TTG v PPG" "The Teen Titans Go! and Powerpuff Girls Completely Organic Crossover Special"	Peter Rida Michail	Emily Brundige	June 30, 2016	N/A	2.42
After using a repellent to temporarily prevent the Powerpuff Girls from moving, Mojo Jojo uses a teleportation device to teleport himself into Jump City, in the Titans' tower, then the girls follow him into the same place where he appeared, only to run into Robin, Starfire, and Raven. Then, after the girls compete with three of the Titans to see who is better, and Mojo Jojo traps Cyborg and Beast Boy in his new lair, the girls defeat him, with "help" from Robin, Starfire, and Raven.: Note: This episode is a crossover with The Powerpuff Girls 2016 animated series.; Special guest stars: Amanda Leighton as Blossom, Kristen Li as Bubbles, Natalie Palamides as Buttercup, and Roger L. Jackson as Mojo Jojo
145	41	"Island Adventures"	Noel Belknap	Ben Gruber	August 1, 2016	150	1.83
146	42	"Island Adventures"	Bryan Newton	Emily Brundige	August 2, 2016	152	2.07
147	43	"Island Adventures"	Luke Cormican	Ben Gruber	August 3, 2016	151	1.70
148	44	"Island Adventures"	Dave Stone	Ben Gruber	August 4, 2016	153	1.74
149	45	"Island Adventures"	Luke Cormican	Ben Gruber	August 5, 2016	154	1.68
Part 1 "Coconut Cream Pie": The Titans are shipwrecked on a deserted island and must use the island's resources to survive. Part 2 "Pure Protein": The Titans hold a team competition, but have to avoid an alien hunter. Part 3 "Open Door Policy": The Titans try to find food, but stumble upon dinosaurs instead. Part 4 "Crazy Desire Island": Robin eavesdrops on the Titans and grants them wishes to teach them life lessons, but things do not go as he had hoped. Part 5 "The Titans Show": The Titans get sick of the island and decide to leave, only to realize that they have in fact been unknowingly press-ganged into a reality TV show by the Teen Titans' villains and Control Freak.
150	46	"Booty Scooty"	Peter Rida Michail	Ben Gruber	September 5, 2016	142	1.38
The Titans search for pirate treasure to save Titans Tower from wealthy land developers.
151	47	"Who's Laughing Now"	Bryan Newton	Ben Gruber	September 8, 2016	145	1.23
Beast Boy searches for his spirit animal and joins a group of bears.
152	48	"Oregon Trail"	Bryan Newton	Ben Gruber	September 15, 2016	146	1.23
Robin forces the other Titans into a mid-1800s style adventure complete with covered wagons, attacks from the elements, and dysentery.: Note: This episode parodies the video game The Oregon Trail.
153	49	"Snuggle Time"	Bryan Newton	Ben Gruber	September 22, 2016	147	1.32
When yet another crime alert interrupts their relaxation, the Titans decide to become villains and do whatever they want.
154	50	"Oh Yeah!"	Noel Belknap	Ben Gruber	September 29, 2016	148	1.50
Cyborg tells the other Titans that TV wrestling is fake and tries to teach them real wrestling.
155	51	"Riding the Dragon"	Luke Cormican	Will Friedle	September 29, 2016	149	1.50
While playing a fantasy game, the Titans get trapped inside. Robin tries to tell them to play by the rules, but they ignore him.
156	52	"The Overbite"	Bryan Newton	Ben Gruber	October 6, 2016	155	1.16
Raven teaches the Titans to dance properly, but then the Titans learn the forbidden moves and are summoned by the dance demon.
157	53	"The Cape"	Aaron Horvath, Michael Jelenic & Peter Rida Michail	Aaron Horvath, Michael Jelenic & Peter Rida Michail	October 13, 2016	156	1.12
Cyborg and Robin argue over the importance of capes.: Note: This episode is a dub of the original series episode "Divide and Conquer".

=== Season 4 (2016–18) ===
No. overall	No. in season	Title	Directed by	Written by	Original release date	Prod. code	U.S. viewers (millions)
158	1	"Shrimps and Prime Rib"	Dave Stone	Ben Gruber	October 20, 2016	158	1.23
The Titans try to remember how to be superheroes to defeat the Brain. Aqualad, Kid Flash, and Bumblebee and Batman make cameo appearances to beat the Brain in place of the Teen Titans before their motivation of being superheroes and heroines return in full.
159	2	"Halloween v Christmas"	Luke Cormican	Ben Gruber	October 27, 2016	157	1.33
When Santa tries to take over Halloween, it is up to the Titans, the Halloween Spirit, and a few ghouls, to stop him.
160	3	"Booby Trap House"	Dave Stone	Ben Gruber	November 3, 2016	159	1.29
The other Titans accidentally leave Starfire and Cyborg back at the tower when leaving for the team's annual road trip in a hurry due to them having overslept. Determined to make use of their situation, Cyborg and Starfire arm the tower with state of the art booby traps to protect themselves from intruders while the rest of the team is away, while also attempting to act more like "adults" to prove to Robin that they are mature. When the traps go to the other Titans, Starfire and Cyborg turn out to be foolish kids with them thinking that they are adults.
161	4	"Fish Water"	Luke Cormican	Christopher Gentile	November 17, 2016	160	1.30
Starfire wins a goldfish at the Jump City carnival (whom she dubs "The Fish") and vows to keep it alive, despite the other Titans pointing out that goldfish have a very short lifespan.
162	5	"TV Knight"	Luke Cormican & Peter Rida Michail	Luke Cormican, Sean Kreiner & Peter Rida Michail	November 26, 2016	162	1.32
In the first episode of the TV Knight trilogy, Batman and Commissioner Gordon spend the day sitting on the couch, eating snacks, and watching various TV programs, with the programs being various gags thrown together compilation style. Cyborg must quickly catch the ice cream truck when he misses it while getting a haircut; Pain Bot changes and becomes a dancing machine rather than a killing machine after Beast Boy removes a thorn from him; Beast Boy and Cyborg have fun calling each other on their communicators, but this annoys Raven; Robin fails to shine the right signal for Batman; Raven cooks an impatient Trigon breakfast; Cyborg and Beast Boy engage in a thrilling staring contest; Starfire in her Jeff mask and a bottle of mustard chase after a pickle and an onion who have committed a crime; Sticky Joe meets Sticky Joan (a female version of himself) and flirts with her, but a too-soon kiss lands him a slap on his face.
163	6	"Teen Titans Save Christmas"	Dave Stone	Aaron Horvath & Michael Jelenic	December 1, 2016	165	1.25
Santa quits Christmas and stops giving children presents on Christmas Day because he cannot have the other holidays. The Titans decide to save Christmas themselves.
164	7	"BBSFBDAY!"	Peter Rida Michail	Aaron Horvath	December 3, 2016	161	1.30
When Beast Boy finds out that Starfire never celebrated her birthday on Earth, he decides to share his with her, but eventually realizes that it is not such a good idea after all when he starts acting like a brat.
165	8	"The Streak"	Dave Stone	Ben Gruber	January 27, 2017	163	1.62
166	9	"The Streak"	Luke Cormican	Ben Gruber	January 27, 2017	164	1.62
It is Crime Season, and Robin is determined to continue his streak of stopping 52 crimes every year (an allusion to the previous hiatus-free season of 52 episodes), much to the Titans's dismay. Kid Flash takes Cyborg, Starfire and Raven, leaving Robin with only Beast Boy. Kid Flash returns to ruin Robin's streak on purpose and Robin makes the Tooth Fairy, Santa Claus, and Sticky Joe the new Teen Titans.
167	10	"The Inner Beauty of a Cactus"	Luke Cormican	Brady Klosterman	February 3, 2017	166	1.27
After Starfire's misunderstanding about actual animals at the Jump City Zoo, Robin decides to play Spin the Bottle where Starfire can improve her English through kissing, but he goes insane when Starfire kisses the other Titans and when his bottle lands on a cactus, which he falls in love with. When Starfire goes around kissing people, she loses her own personality more and more.
168	11	"Movie Night"	Ed Skudder & Lynn Wang	Story by : Ed Skudder & Lynn Wang; Teleplay by : Chad Quandt & Aaron Waltke	February 10, 2017	167	1.17
The Titans have a hard time deciding who gets to choose which movie they watch on Movie Night. When their TV is broken, they get the TV from the basement, but more trouble ensues.
169	12	"BBRAE"	Dave Stone	Ben Gruber	February 20, 2017	169	1.62
170	13	"BBRAE"	Luke Cormican	Ben Gruber	February 20, 2017	170	1.62
Beast Boy writes a song for Raven that makes her happy. When he goes on tour with it and becomes too popular with the girls, Raven curses the song in such a manner that it spreads anger and hatred everywhere, including among her fellow Titans.
171	14	"Permanent Record"	Luke Cormican	Jacqueline Menville	March 3, 2017	168	1.15
It is back to school day, and Robin decides to teach the Titans things as a teacher, but he becomes the student when they decide to teach. Beast Boy teaches science, Starfire teaches incorrect grammar, Cyborg teaches chemistry, and Raven is the substitute. Of all their unique lessons, Robin receives all four check marks, thus forever ruining his permanent record.
172	15	"Titan Saving Time"	Peter Rida Michail	Steve Borst	March 10, 2017	171	0.98
The Titans (not Robin) complain about the missing hour (2:00 AM) and look for 2:00 AM at a farmer's barn. At first Robin does not believe this, but when it is true, Robin admits that he is wrong.
173	16	"The Gold Standard"	Dave Stone	Steve Borst	March 17, 2017	172	1.27
It is St. Patrick's Day, and, after wishing to become a leprechaun, Beast Boy becomes obsessed with gold.
174	17	"Master Detective"	Luke Cormican	Jacqueline Menville	March 31, 2017	173	1.00
Robin claims that he is a master detective and tries to find out what happened to the animals on the island that the Titans live on. The only animal left is an octopus.
175	18	"Easter Creeps"	Dave Stone	Christopher Gentile	April 14, 2017	174	1.27
The Tooth Fairy returns to take over Easter and the Titans must stop her.
176	19	"Hand Zombie"	Luke Cormican	Steve Borst	April 21, 2017	176	1.08
After Starfire kisses his hand, Robin vows to never wash it again, which leads to disastrous results.
177	20	"Employee of the Month: Redux"	Peter Rida Michail	Rob Hoegee	April 28, 2017	178	0.93
The Titans try to stop UFOs from kidnapping cows from Earth. Meanwhile, Beast Boy reluctantly gets a job at a fast-food meat-place to get a moped.: Note: This episode is a re-creation of the original series episode "Employee of the Month".
178	21	"The Avogodo"	James Krenzke	Christopher Gentile	May 5, 2017	175	1.18
On Cinco de Mayo, Robin discovers that avocados can grant different abilities to whoever consumes them. He becomes overly obsessed with the superfood and is taken over by "the God of Avocados".
179	22	"Orangins"	Luke Cormican	Aaron Horvath	May 29, 2017	177	1.47
The Teen Titans each tell their (slightly inaccurate) origin story.
180	23	"Jinxed"	James Krenzke	Jacquie Menville	June 9, 2017	179	1.04
Robin ignores the rules for a game of jinx and ends up losing his voice. The Titans learn that Jinx collects voices as a hobby and go to the H.I.V.E. Five Tower to get it back.
181	24	"Brain Percentages"	Peter Rida Michail	Steve Borst	June 16, 2017	185	0.95
Beast Boy starts using more than 10% of his brain in an effort to find the hidden images in a puzzle, but it soon gets out of hand.
182	25	"BL4Z3"	Dave Stone	Brady Klosterman	June 23, 2017	186	1.02
The Teen Titans become master hackers to stop a gang of computer pirates from dominating the World Wide Web.
183	26	"Hot Salad Water"	Luke Cormican	Christopher Gentile	June 30, 2017	184	1.02
When drinking tea turns the other Titans English, it is up to Robin to save America from another British invasion led by the Queen of the United Kingdom herself.
184	27	"The Day the Night Stopped Beginning to Shine and Became Dark Even Though It Was the Day"	Luke Cormican & Peter Rida Michail	Michael Jelenic & Aaron Horvath	August 1, 2017	180	1.59
185	28	"The Day the Night Stopped Beginning to Shine and Became Dark Even Though It Was the Day"	Luke Cormican & Peter Rida Michail	Michael Jelenic & Aaron Horvath	August 2, 2017	181	1.54
186	29	"The Day the Night Stopped Beginning to Shine and Became Dark Even Though It Was the Day"	Luke Cormican & Peter Rida Michail	Michael Jelenic & Aaron Horvath	August 3, 2017	182	1.72
187	30	"The Day the Night Stopped Beginning to Shine and Became Dark Even Though It Was the Day"	Luke Cormican & Peter Rida Michail	Michael Jelenic & Aaron Horvath	August 4, 2017	183	1.87
"Chapter One: I Saw You Dance": Cyborg becomes trapped in the alternate reality of "The Night Begins to Shine" with a dragon who wants to steal the song for his own evil purposes. "Chapter Two: The Story in Your Eyes": Without Cyborg, Beast Boy feels lost and sets out to find himself, but ends up meeting a music legend. "Chapter Three: Playing Hard to Get": The Titans return to the alternate reality to save Cyborg and try to defeat the dragon. "Chapter Four: The Night Begins to Shine": In a final epic battle, the Titans' and their musician allies square off against the evil dragon for control of "The Night Begins to Shine".: Special guest stars: Patrick Stump, Pete Wentz, Joe Trohman, Andy Hurley of Fall Out Boy, rapper CeeLo Green, Carl Burnett, Frank Enea, and William J. Reagan as themselves
188	31	"Lication"	Dave Stone	Steve Borst	September 1, 2017	187	1.03
Robin introduces the Titans to a free money-making app, but they soon learn the dangers of a shareconomy.
189	32	"Labor Day"	Ken McIntyre	Jacqueline Menville	September 4, 2017	191	1.31
Robin uses Labor Day as an opportunity to teach the other Titans about the importance of labor.
190	33	"Classic Titans"	Dave Stone	Brady Klosterman	September 15, 2017	188	1.04
Control Freak attempts to prove his point about classic superhero cartoons by sending the Titans to a former version of Teen Titans Go!.
191	34	"Ones and Zeroes"	Luke Cormican	Steve Borst	September 22, 2017	192	0.98
The Titans build an AI robot so that it will create a pizza that has never been made before.
192	35	"Career Day"	Mark Marek	Steve Borst	September 29, 2017	193	1.01
On Career Day, Robin makes the other Titans get jobs, and at first they hate it, but eventually with what jobs they got, they become successful.
193	36	"TV Knight 2"	Peter Rida Michail	Joey Cappabianca, David Gemmill, Aaron Horvath, Michael Jelenic & Peter Rida Michail	October 6, 2017	194	0.87
In the second episode of the TV Knight trilogy, Batman and Commissioner Gordon are watching TV programs in a compilation style episode again, but this time it is during a slumber party and they invite the Joker and the Penguin, but they need to be careful to not let Alfred catch them awake. Starfire bakes cookies that when eaten, gives the emotion and Cyborg serves as the taste tester; Birdarang sings a song to show a couple of kids how "hard" he is; Beast Boy sings a song to Raven about how he will not be hitting on Terra and staying with her (but at some points he does anyway); Silkie sings a rap about himself and other bugs; Robin's parasitic twin that lives in his eye socket teaches him to just go on this upcoming date as himself; Raven is enlisted to get a baby rain cloud who is ruining the pegasus' cotton candy crops to stop after being transported to Pretty Pretty Pegasus.
194	37	"Justice League's Next Top Talent Idol Star"	James Krenzke	Steve Borst	October 9, 2017	189	1.43
195	38	"Justice League's Next Top Talent Idol Star"	Luke Cormican	Steve Borst	October 9, 2017	190	1.43
In a parody of America's Got Talent, the Justice League are the judges and whoever wins becomes a member of the Justice League, so Robin will do whatever it takes to win the competition.
196	39	"The Academy"	James Krenzke	Michael Jelenic & Aaron Horvath	October 20, 2017	195	1.12
Robin creates the Teen Titans Awards in an effort to get his teammates to clean up the tower.
197	40	"Costume Contest"	Mark Marek	Jacqueline Menville	October 27, 2017	197	1.21
Tired of losing to the H.I.V.E. Five every year, the Titans hatch a scheme to win the Halloween costume contest by dressing up as the H.I.V.E. Five.
198	41	"Throne of Bones"	James Krenzke	Steve Borst	November 3, 2017	196	1.11
When the Titans end up going to a heavy metal concert instead of what they thought was a smooth jazz concert, the heavy metal takes over the Titans (except Robin). After playing a heavy metal record backwards despite Robin's warnings, the other Titans end up in Metalworld, a world full of heavy metal, so Robin must go in after them.
199	42	"Demon Prom"	Ken McIntyre	Amy Wolfram	November 10, 2017	200	1.20
When Trigon forces Raven to attend her prom, she brings the rest of the Titans along with her to upset him.
200	43	"Thanksgetting"	Ken McIntyre	Steve Borst	November 17, 2017	202	1.17
Tired of the normal traditions, the Titans decide to create their own for Thanksgiving.
201	44	"The Self-Indulgent 200th Episode Spectacular!"	Ken McIntyre	Michael Jelenic & Aaron Horvath	November 24, 2017	198	1.57
202	45	"The Self-Indulgent 200th Episode Spectacular!"	Dave Stone	Michael Jelenic & Aaron Horvath	November 24, 2017	199	1.57
When their world starts disappearing, the Titans must confront their developers. Later, the Titans learn how difficult it is to make a cartoon when they try to animate Michael and Aaron.: Special guest stars: Peter Rida Michail, Albert Jelenic (Michael Jelenic's father), Graham Horvath (Aaron Horvath's son), Sam Register, Aaron Horvath, and Michael Jelenic as themselves; Note: The main cast also voices their fictional animated selves. The crew behind the series also appear in animated form.
203	46	"BBCYFSHIPBDAY"	Mark Marek	Jacqueline Menville	December 8, 2017	201	0.93
Beast Boy and Cyborg celebrate the birthday of their friendship literally because it is a merged version of them.
204	47	"Beast Girl"	Mark Marek	Jacqueline Menville	February 19, 2018	204	1.43
Beast Boy meets a female version of himself called Beast Girl and learns that they have so much in common.: Special guest star: Cree Summer as Beast Girl
205	48	"Flashback"	James Krenzke	Steve Borst	March 30, 2018	207	1.18
206	49	"Flashback"	Ken McIntyre	Steve Borst	March 30, 2018	208	1.18
Super-nice Robin the Boy Wonder moves to Jump City, and is overwhelmed by its villains, so he decides to build a hero team. Some of the candidates bring out his worst qualities, and Kid Flash boots him off his own team. Robin then enlists the washouts to retake the tower, fully embracing his anger and pettiness.: Note: As for the flashback, this is the pilot episode of Teen Titans Go! for this season.
207	50	"Bro-Pocalypse"	Mark Marek	Kyle Stafford	May 28, 2018	206	0.72
When the male Titans are injured from a weight-lifting accident, Starfire and Raven must become bros by fist bumping a giant fist that is headed towards Earth or else the "Bro-Pocalypse" will happen, where every bro loses what makes them a bro.
208	51	"Mo' Money Mo' Problems"	Ken McIntyre	Christopher Gentile	December 1, 2017 (Online); June 25, 2018 (TV)	203	0.50
When Beast Boy decides to hibernate in the Batcave, he finds this as an opportunity to get Robin to give him and the other Titans a tour of Wayne Manor (with references to many Batman movies). When the Titans believe that money solves all problems, Robin says it does not and that it is a vice, the Titans then learn that Robin has always wanted a Bell Biv DeVoe poster in his room, and soon money might actually fix Robin's problem.
209	52	"TV Knight 3"	Ken McIntyre	Ken McIntyre	June 25, 2018	205	0.54
In the third episode of the TV Knight saga, Batman refuses to pay attention to the birthday party that the Justice League set up for him and tries to watch TV instead. In a parody of Knight Rider, Beast Boy (as Michael Knight) and Cyborg (as KITT) argue that there is no crime in the desert that they are in; in a commercial for the Jump City Zoo, Raven calls out animals that Beast Boy turns into, which wears him out; a sitcom called The Jellynecks features the Titans screaming with actual jellynecks; Starfire tells a joke to Robin in a show that is a parody of Hee Haw; a nature documentary covers the Titans' usual antics; the sitcom The Jellynecks continues with Starfire answering a call from Robin; a commercial showing how mustaches can turn Robin's life around; the final episode of The Jellynecks features the Titans' having a picnic.

=== Season 5 (2018–20) ===
No. overall	No. in season	Title	Directed by	Written by	Original release date	Prod. code	U.S. viewers (millions)
210	1	"The Scoop!"	Dave Stone	Ethan Nicolle	June 25, 2018	209	0.59
Starfire becomes friends with an ice cream scoop that she stole from H.I.V.E.'s ice cream social. The Titans believe Starfire's attraction to inanimate objects is strange, but Starfire believes that inanimate objects are special.
211	2	"Chicken in the Cradle"	Victor Courtright	Ethan Nicolle	June 25, 2018	210	0.70
After being warned by Robin that his responsibilities will catch up with him, Beast Boy lays an egg. Using his animal-changing powers to goof off instead of taking care of his newly-hatched baby chick, the Titans decide to care for it, and Beast Boy starts to realize maybe he is not being the best father to the baby chick and that it is time to be one.
212	3	"Kabooms"	Dave Stone	Michael Jelenic & Aaron Horvath	July 20, 2018	211	N/A
213	4	"Kabooms"	James Krenzke	Michael Jelenic & Aaron Horvath	July 20, 2018	212	N/A
Robin proposes that the Titans should go see a movie based on the show Babies vs. Dogs, but the Titans will not be in unless explosions are featured, which Robin says that there will be. When they head to the movies the Titans enjoy the film because of the action, until the film's exposition starts to ruin it for them (except Robin). After the movie, the Titans decide to make their own movie that is not about themselves, but Raven fears that creative differences will ruin the film. With Beast Boy and Cyborg as script writers, Robin as the director, Starfire on wardrobe, and Raven on makeup, the Titans work together to make the movie, but things do not go so well.: Note: This episode takes place before the events of Teen Titans Go! To the Movies.
214	5	"Tower Renovation"	Ken McIntyre	Christopher Gentile	August 13, 2018	213	0.62
Taking place after the events of Teen Titans Go! To the Movies, the Tower is still destroyed, thanks to Slade. The Titans decide to go to City Hall, but their blueprint is denied; they then try and house hunt, but are unsuccessful when the Titans except for Robin disagree with every house. They believe that they are forever homeless, until Robin takes a risk and has him and the Titans try to rebuild the tower without City Hall finding out.
215	6	"My Name is Jose"	Ken McIntyre	Amy Wolfram	October 8, 2018	220	0.71
The Titans have Raven give them new superpowers, but have a hard time adjusting.
216	7	"The Power of Shrimps"	Dave Stone	Michael Jelenic & Aaron Horvath	October 8, 2018	219	0.71
Aqualad uses shrimps and prime rib to try to win back Raven.
217	8	"Monster Squad"	Dave Stone	Michael Jelenic	October 19, 2018	222	0.57
The Titans want to be the scariest trick-or-treaters in town, so Raven casts a spell to turn them into real monsters.
218	9	"Real Orangins"	James Krenzke	Michael Jelenic & Aaron Horvath	November 5, 2018	221	0.67
Robin tries again to tell the real origin story of the Teen Titans.
219	10	"Quantum Fun"	Ken McIntyre	Michael Jelenic	November 6, 2018	214	0.62
Robin takes the other Titans on a trip through the dizzying world of quantum physics.
220	11	"The Fight"	Luke Cormican	Michael Jelenic & Aaron Horvath	November 7, 2018	215	0.69
Robin tries to teach the other Titans about real estate, but they are only interested in finding a villain to fight.
221	12	"The Groover"	Luke Cormican	Michael Jelenic & Aaron Horvath	November 8, 2018	218	0.65
Robin takes the Titans on an educational trip to the Grand Canyon.
222	13	"Justice League's Next Top Talent Idol Star: Second Greatest Team Edition"	James Krenzke	Ethan Nicolle	November 21, 2018	223	0.87
223	14	"Justice League's Next Top Talent Idol Star: Second Greatest Team Edition"	Ken McIntyre	Ethan Nicolle	November 21, 2018	224	0.87
The Justice League holds another talent competition to find the second best superhero team in the world. The competition heats up and the Titans must find a way to beat the H.I.V.E. Five.: Note: An alternate ending to this episode, featuring the return of B.E.R., premiered on November 30, 2018.
224	15	"How's This For a Special? Spaaaace"	Ken McIntyre	Brady Klosterman	December 21, 2018	227	0.83
225	16	"How's This For a Special? Spaaaace"	Luke Cormican	Brady Klosterman	December 21, 2018	228	0.83
After receiving a galactic crime alert the Titans take off for an epic space adventure. The Titans have to stop Darkseid's latest scheme, but the excitement of the space adventure might be too much for Robin to handle.
226	17	"BBRBDAY"	Dave Stone	Christopher Gentile	December 31, 2018	225	0.65
When he is not invited to Beast Boy's birthday party, Robin throws his own party with special guest Bob Uecker.: Special guest star: Bob Uecker as himself
227	18	"Slapping Butts and Celebrating for No Reason"	James Krenzke	Christopher Gentile	January 28, 2019	231	0.54
When the Big Game is threatened, the Titans must infiltrate the football stadium and stop the attack.
228	19	"Nostalgia is Not a Substitute for an Actual Story"	James Krenzke	Amy Wolfram	February 4, 2019	229	0.66
The Titans time travel back to the 1980s to determine whether or not it was the best decade ever.
229	20	"Business Ethics Wink Wink"	Ken McIntyre	Brady Klosterman	February 11, 2019	230	0.50
Starfire dreams of becoming a successful business alien princess and joins a cookie-selling organization to learn the proper skills.
230	21	"Genie President"	James Krenzke	Brady Klosterman	February 18, 2019 (Note: This episode first aired in the United Kingdom on February 11, 2019.)	216	0.58
Robin hatches a plan to get rich off pennies, but Starfire believes that they are magical.
231	22	"Tall Titan Tales"	Luke Cormican	Brady Klosterman	February 25, 2019	226	0.54
Robin tries to tell some tall tales, but the other Titans give their own fractured versions instead.
232	23	"I Used To Be A Peoples"	Luke Cormican	Jeff Prezenkowski	March 4, 2019	232	0.50
Robin feels the other Titans are spending too much time together, so he encourages them to spend some time alone.
233	24	"The Metric System vs Freedom"	Ken McIntyre	Brady Klosterman	March 11, 2019	233	0.57
Robin teaches the other Titans about the difference between the imperial system and the metric system.
234	25	"The Chaff"	Luke Cormican	Michael Jelenic & Aaron Horvath	March 18, 2019	234	0.53
In an effort to get Teen Titans Go! cancelled, Control Freak shows off some deleted scenes.
235	26	"Them Soviet Boys"	James Krenzke	Tim Sheridan	March 25, 2019	236	0.40
The Titans learn how to montage to quickly get through their chores and karate lessons.
236	27	"Little Elvis"	Dave Stone	Christopher Gentile	April 1, 2019 (Note: This episode first aired in the United Kingdom on February 12, 2019.)	217	0.42
The Titans team up with Shazam to defeat the evil Mister Mind.
237	28	"Booty Eggs"	James Krenzke	Kevin McQuarn	April 15, 2019	242	0.56
Not wanting to be creeped out on Easter, the Titans dispatch the Easter Bunny and take matters into their own hands.
238	29	"TV Knight 4"	Dave Stone	Dave Stone	April 22, 2019	243	0.42
In the fourth episode of the TV Knight saga, Batman and Commissioner Gordon go camping, but instead of fun outdoor activities they would rather watch TV.
239	30	"Lil' Dimples"	Luke Cormican	Kyle Stafford	April 29, 2019	237	0.61
Thinking it is a way to reconnect with her father, Raven enters a beauty pageant.
240	31	"Don't Be An Icarus"	Luke Cormican	Brady Klosterman	May 6, 2019	241	0.62
Robin tries to tell some Greek myths, but the other Titans give their own fractured versions instead.
241	32	"Stockton, CA!"	Ken McIntyre	Hynden Walch	May 13, 2019	238	0.58
The Titans must find a way to keep all the Jump City residents from moving to Stockton.
242	33	"What's Opera Titans"	Dave Stone	Brady Klosterman	May 20, 2019	247	0.53
Robin surprises the Titans with a trip to the opera, but they soon fall asleep and all of them dream about starring in their own operas.
243	34	"Forest Pirates"	Ken McIntyre	Jacquie Menville	May 27, 2019	248	0.74
The Titans are at Super Hero Summer Camp for the week and they may need to add another teammate to win the big canoe race.: Note: The first part of the special Teen Titans Go!: Super Summer Hero Camp.
244	35	"The Bergerac"	James Krenzke	Jacquie Menville	June 3, 2019	249	0.57
The Titans give Robin advice to guide him through his camp romance with Wonder Girl.: Note: The second part of the special Teen Titans Go!: Super Summer Hero Camp.
245	36	"Snot and Tears"	James Krenzke	Jacquie Menville	June 10, 2019	250	0.53
Robin tells the Titans to stop being reckless teens or the Creepy Catcher will get them.: Note: The third part of the special Teen Titans Go!: Super Summer Hero Camp.
246	37	"Campfire!"	Dave Stone	Jacquie Menville	June 17, 2019	251	0.44
The Titans put on a show, but Robin warns that the performance must be boring or else they will wake up the wolves.: Note: The fourth part of the special Teen Titans Go!: Super Summer Hero Camp.
247	38	"What We Learned at Camp"	Ken McIntyre	Jacquie Menville	June 24, 2019	252	0.45
After not receiving participation medals, the Titans must demonstrate what they learned at camp.: Note: The fifth and final part of the special Teen Titans Go!: Super Summer Hero Camp.
248	39	"Communicate Openly"	Luke Cormican	Steve Borst	July 1, 2019	253	0.39
Bumblebee becomes the sixth Titan and moves into the Tower, but has a hard time adjusting.
249	40	"Royal Jelly"	Dave Stone	Merrill Hagan	July 8, 2019	254	0.37
Bumblebee offers to help Robin with his leadership skills by teaching him how to act like a queen bee.
250	41	"Strength of a Grown Man"	Ken McIntyre	Brady Klosterman	July 15, 2019	255	0.47
Needing a hero with shrinking powers, but forgetting about Bumblebee, Robin invites the Atom to join their fight against the Brain.: Special guest star: Patton Oswalt as the Atom
251	42	"Had to Be There"	Luke Cormican	Steve Borst	July 22, 2019	256	0.60
So that she is not left out of inside jokes, the Titans time travel to past adventures and insert Bumblebee into their memories.
252	43	"Girls Night In"	Ken McIntyre	Amy Wolfram	July 29, 2019	257	0.50
253	44	"Girls Night In"	James Krenzke	Amy Wolfram	August 5, 2019	258	0.44
Part 1: The Girls Night Out Crew decide to stay in and have a slumber party, but an unknown alien threat descends on Jump City. Part 2: When Blackfire begins her plan to conquer Earth, the girls must pull out all the stops to defeat her.
254	45	"The Great Disaster"	Adam Burton	Adam Burton	August 12, 2019	259	0.56
Robin gets amnesia and starts thinking that Hawkman is his mother.
255	46	"The Viewers Decide"	Luke Cormican	Jacquie Menville	August 19, 2019	260	0.42
It is Titans West vs. Titans East as the two teams compete for who gets Bumblebee.: Note: This episode takes place before the events of Teen Titans Go! vs. Teen Titans.
256	47	"Cartoon Feud"	James Krenzke	Brady Klosterman	October 4, 2019	240	0.55
Control Freak forces the Titans and Mystery Inc. to compete on Family Feud.: Note: This episode takes place after the events of Teen Titans Go! vs. Teen Titans, and is a crossover between Teen Titans Go! and Scooby-Doo.
257	48	"Curse of the Booty Scooty"	Dave Stone	Christopher Gentile	October 4, 2019	235	0.55
When Robin "Booty Scooty's" his booty off, the Titans must go on an adventure to recover it.
258	49	"Collect Them All!"	Dave Stone	Christopher Gentile	October 4, 2019	239	0.58
After the other Titans are turned into collectibles and disappear, Robin must search yard sales and stores to find them.
259	50	"Teen Titans Vroom"	Dave Stone	Brady Klosterman	November 9, 2019	245	0.62
260	51	"Teen Titans Vroom"	Luke Cormican	Brady Klosterman	November 9, 2019	246	0.62
The Titans gain the ability to transform into cars (which parodies the plot of Turbo Teen and the theme music and visual imaging of Transformers), and must learn to work together to stop Dr. Military.: Special guest stars: Sgt. Slaughter as Dr. Military and Dale Earnhardt Jr. as Chip Racerson Jr.
261	52	"Teen Titans Roar!"	Ken McIntyre	Michael Jelenic	April 4, 2020	244	0.44
Outraged when their favorite cartoon is rebooted, the Titans come up with a plan to get the new show off the air.: Note: This is a crossover between Teen Titans Go! and ThunderCats Roar.; Special guest stars: Larry Kenney as Original Lion-O, Michael Jelenic as Original Snarf, Max Mittelman as ThunderCats Roar Lion-O

=== Season 6 (2019–21) ===
No. overall	No. in season	Title	Directed by	Written by	Original release date	Prod. code	U.S. viewers (millions)
262	1	"Butt Atoms"	James Krenzke	Ben Gruber	October 4, 2019	262	0.58
Despite Robin's warning, the Titans mess around with atomic toots and end up causing a worldwide plague.
263	2	"TV Knight 5"	Ken McIntyre & Dave Stone	Ken McIntyre & Dave Stone	October 14, 2019	261	0.42
Batman pretends to be sick to avoid work so he and Commissioner Gordon can run around town watching their favorite shows.
264	3	"Witches Brew"	Dave Stone	Christopher Gentile	October 25, 2019	263	0.50
The Titans throw a Halloween party and invite the Justice League but the witches brew Robin creates has side effects.
265	4	"That's What's Up!"	James Krenzke	Brady Klosterman	November 27, 2019	266	0.71
Beast Boy goes to visit the Doom Patrol.: Note: The first part of the special Teen Titans Go!: Beast Boy's That's What's Up.
266	5	"Crab Shenanigans"	Ken McIntyre	Brady Klosterman	November 27, 2019	267	0.71
Beast Boy, Negative Girl, and Robotman discover some crabs are up to no good.: Note: The second part of the special Teen Titans Go!: Beast Boy's That's What's Up.
267	6	"Brobots"	Peter Rida Michail	Brady Klosterman	November 27, 2019	268	0.71
Cyborg becomes inseparable from Robotman.: Note: The third part of the special Teen Titans Go!: Beast Boy's That's What's Up.
268	7	"Brain Flip"	Luke Cormican	Brady Klosterman	November 27, 2019	269	0.71
It is time for Beast Boy to leave, but the Doom Patrol try to get him to stay.: Note: The fourth and final part of the special Teen Titans Go!: Beast Boy's That's What's Up.
269	8	"Beast Boy on a Shelf"	Luke Cormican	Jacquie Menville	December 21, 2019	265	0.77
Santa Claus forces Beast Boy to become a spy and report on the Titans' naughty behavior.
270	9	"Christmas Crusaders"	Ken McIntyre	Jacquie Menville	December 21, 2019	264	0.73
Santa Claus and Robin must stop the nefarious Coal Miner.: Special guest star: Gilbert Gottfried as the Coal Miner
271	10	"We're Off to Get Awards"	Luke Cormican	Jacquie Menville	February 22, 2020	275	0.42
During an awards ceremony, Robin is swept up by a tornado and arrives in a magical land.
272	11	"Bat Scouts"	Ken McIntyre	Charley Feldman	February 22, 2020	272	0.42
To reach the highest rank in the Bat Scouts, Robin teaches the other Titans important vigilante skills.
273	12	"Walk Away"	Luke Cormican	Brady Klosterman	February 29, 2020	270	0.45
After the T-Car is destroyed in a fight, the Titans go to a used car lot to find another vehicle.
274	13	"Record Book"	James Krenzke	Steve Borst	March 7, 2020	271	0.47
Starfire wants a world record, so she decides to grow her fingernails.
275	14	"Magic Man"	Careen Ingle	Jeff Prezenkowski	March 14, 2020	273	0.51
In a quest to become a magic man, Beast Boy accidentally destroys Raven's spell book, so they must find another.
276	15	"The Titans Go Casual"	James Krenzke	Steve Borst	March 21, 2020	274	0.37
The Superhero Board of Authority institutes a dress code, which leads the Titans to introduce Casual Tuesday.
277	16	"Rain On Your Wedding Day"	Careen Ingle	Jacquie Menville	March 28, 2020	276	0.39
While facing off with the Brain, Robin tries to teach the other Titans the proper definition of irony.
278	17	"Egg Hunt"	James Krenzke & Ken McIntyre	Amy Wolfram	April 10, 2020	277	0.62
When Robin still regrets not being able to find an Easter egg when he was a kid, the Titans head to Gotham to solve the mystery.
279	18	"Justice League's Next Top Talent Idol Star: Justice League Edition"	James Krenzke	Brady Klosterman	May 25, 2020	281	0.54
280	19	"Justice League's Next Top Talent Idol Star: Justice League Edition"	Careen Ingle	Brady Klosterman	May 25, 2020	282	0.54
The Justice League holds yet another talent competition, only this time they are facing off against the Titans. To be the most talented superhero team in the DC universe, Robin and Beast Boy must work together on a jazz performance.
281	20	"The Night Begins to Shine"	Peter Rida Michail	Brady Klosterman	July 10, 2020	283	0.81
282	21	"The Night Begins to Shine"	Peter Rida Michail	Brady Klosterman	July 10, 2020	284	0.81
283	22	"The Night Begins to Shine"	Peter Rida Michail	Brady Klosterman	July 10, 2020	285	0.81
284	23	"The Night Begins to Shine"	James Krenzke	Brady Klosterman	July 10, 2020	286	0.81
285	24	"The Night Begins to Shine"	James Krenzke	Brady Klosterman	July 10, 2020	287	0.81
"Chapter One: Mission to Find the Lost Stems": The elderly Titans decide to take one last trip to the world of "The Night Begins to Shine" only to encounter Ultralak, a new villain ruling the land. "Chapter Two: Drums": The Titans must find three music stems to stop Ultralak, but will need help from a local miner to get the first stem away from the Sheriff. "Chapter Three: Guitar": The Titans are horrified to learn that songs are being melted down and polluting the landscape. "Chapter Four: Bass": To retrieve the final stem, the Titans must concur a virtual world full of increasingly harder obstacles. "Chapter Five: You're the One": The Titans use the three stems to summon BER and stop Ultralak.: Special guest stars: Malcolm McDowell as Baxtory, Jonathan Adams as Ultralak/Neil Adams, Dan Bakkedahl as the Sheriff, Jaleel White as the Miner, James Hong as Turtle, Peter Stormare as Fibulon and Carl Burnett, Frank Enea and William J. Reagan as themselves
286	25	"Where Exactly on the Globe Is Carl Sanpedro"	Luke Cormican	Brady Klosterman	August 10, 2020	279	0.51
287	26	"Where Exactly on the Globe Is Carl Sanpedro"	Ken McIntyre	Brady Klosterman	August 11, 2020	288	0.41
288	27	"Where Exactly on the Globe Is Carl Sanpedro"	Ken McIntyre	Brady Klosterman	August 12, 2020	289	0.42
289	28	"Where Exactly on the Globe Is Carl Sanpedro"	Careen Ingle	Brady Klosterman	August 13, 2020	290	0.44
Part 1: The Titans fly to Los Angeles but end up in San Pedro, where Berto tells them about villainous longshoreman, Carl Sanpedro. Part 2: When Carl Sanpedro strikes in Jamaica, the Titans take off for the Caribbean. Part 3: The Titans travel to India to stop Carl Sanpedro and learn about the sport of cricket. Part 4: In the final epic showdown with Carl Sanpedro, the Titans head to Croatia, the home of dragons and ice zombies.: Note: This episode was dedicated in memory of Albert Jelenic, Michael Jelenic's father, who died in December 2019.
290	29	"Ghost With the Most"	Peter Rida Michail	Brady Klosterman	October 5, 2020	305	0.26
When the Halloween Spirit is kidnapped, the Titans must team with Betelgeuse to save the holiday.: Special guest star: Alex Brightman as Betelgeuse (reprising his role from the Broadway musical); Note: This is a crossover between Teen Titans Go! and Beetlejuice.
291	30	"Bucket List"	Luke Cormican	Rob Kutner	October 6, 2020	278	0.24
The Titans give Starfire a bucket list of activities to accomplish.
292	31	"TV Knight 6"	Careen Ingle	Careen Ingle	October 7, 2020	280	0.22
Batman is forced to go to the department store with Alfred, but runs off to watch TV with Commissioner Gordon.
293	32	"Kryptonite"	Ken McIntyre	Steve Borst	October 8, 2020	291	0.28
When Robin explains that knowing the weakness makes a better superhero, Starfire journeys to find hers.
294	33	"Thumb War"	Luke Cormican	Christopher Gentile	October 9, 2020	292	0.27
As the other Titans engage in an all out thumb wrestling war, Starfire tries to broker peace.
295	34	"Toddler Titans... Yay!"	Luke Cormican	Steve Borst	November 14, 2020	294	0.48
Control Freak thinks the Titans' humor is too juvenile for their time-slot, so he ages them down to a preschool show.
296	35	"Huggbees"	Ken McIntyre	Brady Klosterman	November 14, 2020	312	0.43
The Brain teams up with a supervillain called the Lobe, so the Titans enlist the help of the Lobe's archenemy, Freakazoid, to stop them.: Note: This is a crossover between Teen Titans Go! and Freakazoid!.; Special guest stars: Paul Rugg as Freakazoid, David Warner as The Lobe, Ed Asner as Sgt. Mike Cosgrove, and Joe Leahy as himself
297	36	"Baby Mouth"	Luke Cormican	Brady Klosterman	November 21, 2020	295	0.37
Robin takes a DNA test to learn his family history and discovers he is from Babylon.
298	37	"The Cast"	James Krenzke	Brady Klosterman	December 12, 2020	293	0.31
After breaking his leg, Robin is confined to his room and spies through a telescope.
299	38	"Superhero Feud"	James Krenzke	Amy Wolfram	December 19, 2020	300	0.42
After both teams solve a problem in their towns (Jump City & Metropolis), Control Freak stages another Family Feud between the DC Super Hero Girls and the Teen Titans to find out who is the best superhero team.: Note: This is a crossover between Teen Titans Go! and DC Super Hero Girls.
300	39	"Lucky Stars"	James Krenzke	Brady Klosterman	January 23, 2021	296	0.29
Raven explains astrology to the Titans and tells their horoscopes, but Cyborg is not a believer.
301	40	"Various Modes of Transportation"	Ken McIntyre	Matty Smith	January 23, 2021	297	0.25
With the other Titans away, Cyborg is forced to take a road trip with Robin.
302	41	"Cool Uncles"	Careen Ingle	Steve Borst	January 30, 2021	298	0.31
The Titans take a trip to Wackadoodles, but Trigon makes Raven babysit her little brothers.
303	42	"Butter Wall"	Luke Cormican	Steve Borst	February 6, 2021	299	0.28
Beast Boy thinks that the world is flat, so the Titans try to prove him otherwise.
304	43	"BBRAEBDAY"	Careen Ingle	Brady Klosterman	February 13, 2021	301	0.30
Raven's demon side has the same birthday as Beast Boy, so the Titans go to Azarath to celebrate her Sinister Sixteen.
305	44	"Don't Press Play"	Peter Rida Michail	Steve Borst	February 20, 2021	311	0.28
The Titans team up with music group De La Soul to fight a monster that stole their music.: Special guest stars: De La Soul (Posdnuos, Trugoy, Maseo) as themselves
306	45	"Real Art"	Ken McIntyre	Steve Borst	February 27, 2021	302	0.35
The Titans try to convince Starfire what real art is.
307	46	"Just a Little Patience…Yeah…Yeah"	James Krenzke	Amy Wolfram	March 6, 2021	303	0.26
Robin tries to teach the Titans patience.
308	47	"Villains in a Van Getting Gelato"	Luke Cormican	Jacquie Menville	March 13, 2021	304	0.28
Brother Blood, Dr. Light, Gizmo, and The Brain are out to get a gelato, while they share stories about their troubles with the Titans.
309	48	"I Am Chair"	James Krenzke	Jenny Jaffe	March 20, 2021	306	0.24
Robin gets a massage chair that relaxes him so much he loses all consciousness.
310	49	"Bumgorf"	Ken McIntyre	Jacquie Menville	March 27, 2021	307	0.33
When the Titans realize they have not seen Silkie for a long time, they take turns guessing what happened to him.
311	50	"The Mug"	Ken McIntyre	Jeff Prezenkowski	April 17, 2021	308	0.28
The Titans become a family sitcom so Robin can earn a "#1 Dad Mug".
312	51	"Hafo Safo"	Luke Cormican	Steve Borst	April 24, 2021	309	0.23
The Titans travel to Silver Lake to see the Hafo Safo sign, but when it is destroyed, they need to look for the foot doctor to rebuild it.
313	52	"Zimdings"	Luke Cormican	Talya Perper	May 1, 2021	310	0.29
When Robin selects the last font on the list for his presentation, it sets off the typocolypse.

=== Season 7 (2021–22) ===
No. overall	No. in season	Title	Directed by	Written by	Original release date	U.S. viewers (millions)
314	1	"Justice League's Next Top Talent Idol Star: Dance Crew Edition"	James Krenzke	Steve Borst	January 8, 2021	0.29
315	2	"Justice League's Next Top Talent Idol Star: Dance Crew Edition"	Ken McIntyre	Steve Borst	January 8, 2021	0.29
Robin is left without a dance crew in the Justice League's talent competition, so Vibe (a new judge) gives him lessons on how to be a world class breakdancer and team player.
316	3	"Feed Me"	Luke Cormican	Talya Perper	April 3, 2021	0.29
The Titans accidentally release a marshmallow ducky that eats things and turns them into marshmallows.
317	4	"Pig in a Poke"	Ken McIntyre	Brady Klosterman	May 8, 2021	0.21
The Titans are worried when Starfire says she has sent all of her money to a prince online, especially when it could be the clown prince himself.
318	5	"P.P."	James Krenzke	Brady Klosterman	May 15, 2021	0.23
The Titans encounter the P.P. Goblin during a museum theft, who uses the Titans' pet peeves against them.
319	6	"A Little Help Please"	Ken McIntyre	Brady Klosterman	May 22, 2021	0.27
The Titans must tone down their actions to calm down the animators' aggressive schedule.
320	7	"Marv Wolfman and George Pérez"	Ken McIntyre	Steve Borst	May 29, 2021	0.20
Marv Wolfman and George Pérez try to think of ideas for a Teen Titans comic series.: Special guest stars: Marv Wolfman and George Pérez as themselves
321	8	"Space House"	James Krenzke	Steve Borst	May 31, 2021	0.32
322	9	"Space House"	Luke Cormican	Steve Borst	May 31, 2021	0.32
323	10	"Space House"	Ken McIntyre	Steve Borst	May 31, 2021	0.32
324	11	"Space House"	Luke Cormican	Steve Borst	May 31, 2021	0.32
The Titans set off on an adventure in space, but they later find out they will be sharing their Space House with the DC Super Hero Girls.: Note: This episode takes place before the events of Teen Titans Go! See Space Jam.; Note: This is the second crossover between Teen Titans Go! and DC Super Hero Girls following "Superhero Feud".
325	12	"Cy & Beasty"	James Krenzke	Brady Klosterman	August 2, 2021	0.19
Cyborg and Beast Boy cannot agree on who is the better main titular character of Tom and Jerry, so they play a little game of cat and mouse themselves to prove each other's idea.: Note: This episode takes place after the events of Teen Titans Go! See Space Jam.
326	13	"T is for Titans"	Luke Cormican	Steve Borst	August 3, 2021	N/A
The Titans are shocked to learn that the T Tower had previous owners.
327	14	"Creative Geniuses"	Luke Cormican	Brady Klosterman	August 4, 2021	0.32
The Titans visit the Jump City Comic Book Con, where they meet Marv Wolfman and George Pérez, but also tangle with Control Freak over an exclusive toy.: Special guest stars: Marv Wolfman and George Pérez as themselves; Note: The main cast also voices their fictional animated selves.
328	15	"Manor and Mannerisms"	Ken McIntyre	Matty White	August 5, 2021	0.21
Robin attends a ball at Wayne Manor hoping to become heir of the mansion, but the other Titans might spoil his chances.
329	16	"Trans Oceanic Magical Cruise"	James Krenzke	Jon & Josh Silberman	August 6, 2021	0.18
It is fun on the high seas, as the Teen Titans enjoy a cruise filled with dangerous missions, fast cars, and alien attacks.
330	17	"Polly Ethylene and Tara Phthalate"	Ken McIntyre	Brady Klosterman	September 4, 2021	0.41
When the Teen Titans' beach day is ruined by garbage in the ocean, they learn all about recycling and cleansing the Earth.
331	18	"EEbows"	Luke Cormican	Steve Borst	September 11, 2021	0.21
Tired of getting pinched, the Titans' elbows rebel and soon bend the very fabric of time and space.
332	19	"Batman's Birthday Gift"	James Krenzke	Jon & Josh Silberman	September 18, 2021	0.18
The Titans join Robin as he travels to deliver a birthday gift to Batman but they are detoured several times along the way.
333	20	"What a Boy Wonders"	James Krenzke	Steve Borst	September 25, 2021	0.24
Robin forms a book club to debut his new autobiography, but the Titans would rather discuss other books.
334	21	"Doomsday Preppers"	Ken McIntyre	Steve Borst	October 2, 2021	0.18
The Tower is in lockdown and supplies are being gathered, as the Titans prepare for Doomsday.
335	22	"Fat Cats"	Ken McIntyre	Steve Borst	October 9, 2021	0.17
After winning a huge cash prize, the Titans learn about the IRS and taxes.
336	23	"Jam"	Luke Cormican	Steve Borst	October 16, 2021	0.24
Harley Quinn, Poison Ivy and Catwoman recruit Starfire and Raven for their roller derby team.
337	24	"DC"	James Krenzke	Brady Klosterman	October 23, 2021	0.16
It is Wonder Woman's 80th birthday, so the Titans head to DC Headquarters for the party.: Note: This episode was shown during the DC Kids FanDome on October 16, 2021.
338	25	"Pepo the Pumpkinman"	Ken McIntyre	Matty Smith	October 27, 2021	0.20
A magic hat brings the Titans' pumpkinman Pepo to life, but they have to figure out how to keep Pepo from rotting.
339	26	"Breakfast"	James Krenzke	Matty Smith	November 6, 2021	0.15
The Titans discover the joys of eating breakfast food for every meal, but it could lead to an old friend becoming too powerful.
340	27	"Captain Cool"	Ken McIntyre	Matty Smith	November 13, 2021	0.15
The Titans' antics with their imaginary friend Captain Cool annoy Robin until make-believe starts becoming real.: Special guest star: Henry Winkler as Captain Cool
341	28	"A Doom Patrol Thanksgiving"	James Krenzke	Brady Klosterman	November 19, 2021	0.20
342	29	"A Doom Patrol Thanksgiving"	Luke Cormican	Steve Borst	November 19, 2021	0.20
Beast Boy visit the Doom Patrol for Thanksgiving where they enter a float for the parade and watch some old home movies of themselves.
343	30	"Glunkakakakah"	Luke Cormican	Steve Borst	November 27, 2021	0.19
Robin teaches the other Titans the art of concealment through a game of hide and seek.
344	31	"Control Freak"	James Krenzke	Matty Smith	December 4, 2021	0.13
When the Titans run amok in the Tower's evidence room, Robin does everything he can to keep things under control.
345	32	"A Holiday Story"	Luke Cormican	Brady Klosterman	December 8, 2021	0.16
Santa Claus enlists Beast Boy's help in getting him back into the Holiday Mob, which is run by Baby New Year.
346	33	"The Drip"	Ken McIntyre	Matty Smith	February 21, 2022	0.14
Robin finally experiences drip, a magical coolness that comes from wearing sneakers, and soon seeks out the ultimate pair.
347	34	"S&P"	Ken McIntyre	Steve Borst	March 7, 2022	0.15
The Titans' negative behavior is giving superheroes a bad name, so they must learn proper conduct to be good role models for kids.
348	35	"Belly Math"	James Krenzke	Brady Klosterman	March 8, 2022	0.19
The Teen Titans must learn common core math to defeat the Calculator.
349	36	"Free Perk"	Luke Cormican	Gene Grillo	March 9, 2022	0.16
Robin teaches his fellow Teen Titans all about health insurance.
350	37	"Go!"	James Krenzke	Steve Borst	March 10, 2022	0.16
Robin struggles to lead the Titans after finding out that his catchphrase "GO!" is trademarked by another superhero team.
351	38	"Finding Aquaman"	Luke Cormican	Gene Grillo	May 14, 2022	0.09
While searching for a missing Aquaman, the Titans find themselves at the mercy of Black Manta.: Special guest stars: Patrick Warburton as Aquaman and J. B. Smoove as Black Manta
352	39	"Whodundidit?"	James Krenzke	Brady Klosterman	May 23, 2022	0.12
While house-sitting at Wayne Manor, the Titans must unravel the mystery of the clogged toilet.
353	40	"Sweet Revenge"	Luke Cormican	Steve Borst	May 24, 2022	0.14
Robin starts working at Mr. Freeze's ice cream shop to get revenge on Joker's Gelato for denying him a free birthday scoop.: Note: This episode take place before the events of Teen Titans Go! & DC Super Hero Girls: Mayhem in the Multiverse.
354	41	"Porch Pirates"	James Krenzke	Gene Grillo	May 25, 2022	0.11
After their package is stolen, the Titans must join a crew of porch pirates to get it back.: Note: This episode take place after the events of Teen Titans Go! & DC Super Hero Girls: Mayhem in the Multiverse.
355	42	"A Sticky Situation"	James Krenzke	Brady Klosterman	May 26, 2022	0.17
Sticky Joe's search for a can opener leads to a series of wacky adventures.
356	43	"The Perfect Pitch?"	Ken McIntyre	Steve Borst	May 27, 2022	0.13
Having watched everything on TV, the Titans decide to make their own show.
357	44	"Pool Season"	Luke Cormican	Gene Grillo	August 1, 2022	0.18
Black Manta offers to build the Titans a new pool, but Robin thinks the construction process is too slow.: Special guest stars: Patrick Warburton as Aquaman, J. B. Smoove as Black Manta
358	45	"Kyle"	Ken McIntyre	Brady Klosterman	August 2, 2022	0.10
The Titans time travel back to the 1990s so they can visit a video store, but encounter a familiar foe.
359	46	"TV Knight 7"	Luke Cormican	Luke Cormican & Josh Weisbrod	August 3, 2022	0.12
To avoid chores, Batman and Gordon time travel to the future, but still find ways to watch TV.
360	47	"We'll Be Right Back"	Ken McIntyre	Steve Borst	August 4, 2022	0.11
Since the commercials are the only part of the show he likes, Control Freak creates extra advertisements to torment the Titans.
361	48	"Jump City Rock"	James Krenzke	Gene Grillo	September 12, 2022	0.15
The Titans transform into rock stars with unique personas as they team up with unexpected allies, Nandi and Thomas Bushell, to face off against the villainous Joker.: Special guest stars: Nandi Bushell and Thomas Bushell as themselves
362	49	"Natural Gas"	Luke Cormican	Steve Borst	September 13, 2022	0.10
The team is fed up with their high utility bills. They decide to become self-sufficient and go "off the grid" to avoid paying for electricity, water, and gas. The episode follows their attempts to create their own eco-friendly solutions, and the wackiness that ensues. There is even a showdown with a villain who wants to keep them hooked on the grid.
363	50	"50% Chad"	Ken McIntyre	Gene Grillo	September 14, 2022	0.09
Tired of their boring villains, the Teen Titans hold auditions for a new arch-nemesis. They meet "50% Chad", a villain with a unique gimmick: he only destroys half of everything he tries to destroy.
364	51	"The Score"	Ken McIntyre	Brady Klosterman	September 15, 2022	0.08
The team's usual background music is replaced by the compositions of an eccentric composer, Ludwig von Sauer. Ludwig's powerful music messes with the Titans' emotions, making them act strangely. The Titans must confront Ludwig to stop his manipulative music and restore their show's (and their own) normalcy.
365	52	"365!"	James Krenzke	Steve Borst	September 16, 2022	0.12
The team celebrates a milestone: their 365th episode. They decide it needs a special touch, so they head to Warner Bros. Studios to find a famous director known as Zack Snyder.: Special guest stars: Zack Snyder as himself and Patrick Wilson as himself

=== Season 8 (2022–24) ===
No. overall	No. in season	Title	Directed by	Written by	Original release date	U.S. viewers (millions)
366	1	"Welcome to Halloween"	Ken McIntyre	Steve Borst	October 7, 2022	0.04
The Teen Titans and their little alien friend Pepo find themselves seeking shelter from the cold in a mysterious castle. There, they encounter the monstrous Krampus, the Christmastime bad guy who punishes naughty children. Robin gets suspicious of Krampus' intentions, but things take a turn when Pepo accidentally destroys a Krampus puzzle, leading to some wacky Halloween hijinks.
367	2	"The Great Holiday Escape"	Luke Cormican	Morgan Evans	December 9, 2022	0.13
The team springs into action when they discover Santa Claus is locked up in a high-security prison. To save Christmas, the Titans must infiltrate the prison and bust Santa out. Their plan, of course, involves hilarious chaos and showdowns with some classic villains.
368	3	"Looking for Love"	James Krenzke	Steve Borst	February 6, 2023	0.12
Chaos erupts when Love itself goes missing. The fate of the world hangs in the balance as the Titans race against time to find Love. Their wacky quest involves following clues hidden within famous love songs, leading them on a wild ride that might even involve a disco train.
369	4	"Teen Titans Action"	James Krenzke	Steve Borst	February 20, 2023	0.11
370	5	"Teen Titans Action"	Luke Cormican	Brady Klosterman	February 20, 2023	0.11
The Titans decide to ditch their comedic routine and become serious action heroes after discovering their action figures are way more popular than the silly ones. They however quickly tire of the constant fighting and danger, and the episode revolves around their attempts to break their deal with a toy company and return to their usual wacky lives. This might even involve getting help from the Justice League.
371	6	"TV Knight 8"	Careen Ingle	Careen Ingle	February 27, 2023	0.11
Commissioner Gordon is stuck working a long shift at the GCPD. Batman, ever the thrill-seeker, decides to join him for some crime-fighting fun and they patrol Gotham together.
372	7	"A Stickier Situation"	James Krenzke	Gene Grillo	March 6, 2023	N/A
Sticky Joe's pet rat, Howdy, runs away when Joe tries to trim his overgrown claws, leading to an extended chase where Joe and Howdy run into several super villains.
373	8	"Winning a Golf Tournament Is the Solution to All of Life's Money Problems"	James Krenzke	Morgan Evans	March 13, 2023	0.07
Cyborg needs $5000 to get back the T-Car when it gets towed for outstanding parking tickets. Robin suggests that Cyborg win the DC Comics Invitational, but the Brain is determined to win instead.
374	9	"Always Be Crimefighting"	Luke Cormican	Steve Borst	March 20, 2023	0.08
Robin threatens to fire the other Titans if they don't get their crime fighting numbers up, but also offers a jet ski as a prize for whomever gets their numbers up the most. The others have nothing but bad leads to rely on.: Note: This episode is a parody of "Glengarry Glen Ross".
375	10	"Easter Annihilation"	James Krenzke	Steve Borst	March 27, 2023	0.11
Cyborg uses satellite tracking to locate Easter eggs, but the tracker stops working. The Titans go to the satellite and find the Easter Bunny attempting an evil plot to make every day Easter.
376	11	"The Brain of the Family"	Ken McIntyre	Morgan Evans	May 6, 2023	0.14
377	12	"The Brain of the Family"	James Krenzke	Morgan Evans	May 6, 2023	0.14
The Brain's bumbling brother, Brian, pays a visit, wreaking havoc for Monsieur Mallah. Brian makes several attempts to prove himself, from planning a party for the Brain's henchmen to using the Brain's new mecha suit to ravage the city and challenge the Teen Titans to a fight. He, however, keeps failing, until he uses an unusual skill to save the day.
378	13	"Arthur"	James Krenzke	Gene Grillo	May 13, 2023	0.14
Robin gives Dr. Light three chances to come up with decent evil plans, or he will fire him. The other Titans take pity on Dr. Light and try to help him.
379	14	"Toilet Water"	Mike Nordstrom	Steve Borst	May 13, 2023	0.13
The Titans agree to dog sit Krypto, the Super Dog. Robin repeatedly warns the others that Krypto will become a "bad dog" if they don't care for Krypto responsibly, but the others let Krypto run amok.
380	15	"Plot Holes"	Ken McIntyre	Steve Borst	May 20, 2023	0.16
Robin rants about how Hollywood movies use special effects to cover up plot holes. The others hit back by creating their own adventure made up of random story elements that make no sense at all.
381	16	"Utility Belt"	Ken McIntyre	Steve Borst	May 20, 2023	0.15
To prove that he can be a hero without it, Robin gives his utility belt away at a thrift store. There, the belt meets other hero and villain accessories given up because of damage or age.
382	17	"Our House"	Mike Nordstrom	Steve Borst	July 24, 2023	0.08
The Brain becomes president of the Codsville HOA to pull a surprise inspection of the Doom Patrol's house.: Note: The first episode of a five episode series of Beast Boy revisiting the Doom Patrol.
383	18	"Beard Hunter"	Ken McIntyre	Gene Grillo	July 25, 2023	0.11
While on a camping trip, the Chief shows the Doom Patrol members the many things he can do with his beard, but warns them that the Beard Hunter is on the loose trying to take his beard away.
384	19	"Elasti-Bot"	Mike Nordstrom	Gene Grillo	July 26, 2023	0.09
The Doom Patrol give Elastigirl a day off to unwind at a spa, but are unable to complete her chores. The Chief constructs a robot to do her chores.
385	20	"Negative Feels"	James Krenzke	Matt Wayne	July 27, 2023	0.08
Negative Girl becomes addicted to negative energy. ElastiGirl warns that the negative energy will make her go nuclear, but Negative Girl defies her and provokes fights between other Doom Patrol members to generate negative energy.
386	21	"New Chum"	Ken McIntyre	Morgan Evans	July 28, 2023	0.11
To learn how to be "extreme", Robotman defies the others and starts hanging out with King Shark and his gang.
387	22	"Intro"	James Krenzke	Morgan Evans	September 23, 2023	0.11
Control Freak tries to prevent "Teen Titans Go" from airing by trapping the Titans within their intro. This trap leads to a chase where the Titans pursue Control Freak through many other show intros, ending in a very familiar one.
388	23	"Haunted Tank"	Mike Nordstrom	Morgan Evans	October 7, 2023	0.22
While at a Halloween festival, the Titans meet the ghost of General Tucker from the Haunted Tank. When he accidentally shoots Robin's prize pumpkin into a house, Tucker and the Titans must confront Tucker's ghost brother Harry to get it back.
389	24	"Warner Bros. 100th Anniversary"	James Krenzke & Ken McIntyre	Morgan Evans	October 14, 2023 (Note: This episode was originally scheduled to premiere on September 23, 2023, but was replaced with "Intro" at the last minute. The episode was accidentally released through Cartoon Network on Demand the same day.)	0.16
390	25	"Warner Bros. 100th Anniversary"	James Krenzke & Ken McIntyre	Morgan Evans	October 14, 2023	0.16
The Titans are officers at the studio lot for the 100th anniversary party of Warner Bros., which is going successful until Michigan J. Frog grabs the magical shield and breaks it into pieces, destroying the studio. The Titans, with Daffy Duck from Looney Tunes, Gizmo from Gremlins, The Brain Gremlin from Gremlins 2: The New Batch and Yogi Bear search for the pieces of the magic shield to restore the studio and defeat Michigan J. Frog.
391	26	"Wishbone"	Ken McIntyre	Gene Grillo	November 18, 2023	0.11
The Titans travel to Gobble Gobble Land when the wishes they made on a Thanksgiving wishbone turn out all wrong.
392	27	"Christmas Magic"	Ken McIntyre	Gene Grillo	December 2, 2023	N/A
The Titans defeat Mumbo Jumbo to acquire the perfect Christmas tree. Mumbo takes revenge by shrinking the Titans to tiny size.
393	28	"Ship"	Mike Nordstrom	Matt Chapman	March 2, 2024	0.11
Starfire recruits the Tooth Fairy, the Freak, 50% Chad, and Folding Paper Man to be her crew on a space voyage to Tamaran, but Platz, the ship's AI, thinks they are all losers.: Note: The first episode of the five episode "Starfire's Galaxy" series.
394	29	"Catpin Freak"	James Krenzke	Matt Chapman	March 9, 2024	0.12
The Freak insists on being made "Catpin" after seeing all the perks Starfire was getting as Captain.: Note: The second episode of the five episode "Starfire's Galaxy" series.
395	30	"50% Crew"	Ken McIntyre	Gene Grillo	March 16, 2024	0.16
Thanks to 50% Chad's half-___ed repairs, the transporter transports only the top halves of the crew, leaving their bottom halves stranded on the ship.: Note: The third episode of the five episode "Starfire's Galaxy" series.
396	31	"Five Bucks"	Mike Nordstrom	Steve Borst	March 23, 2024	0.09
The crew gets excited to receive $5.00 bills from the Tooth Fairy for their teeth. Then they offer to help when she admits that she's never lost a tooth herself.: Note: The fourth episode of the five episode "Starfire's Galaxy" series.
397	32	"Wild Card"	James Krenzke	Talya Perper	March 30, 2024	0.13
Starfire reveals her plan to use the talents of each crew member to maneuver through the traps of the Lost City of Tamaran and secure the Fire Crown before Blackfire finds it. Robin appears having stowed away on the ship, and he offers to be the "wild card" of the plan.: Note: The last episode of the five episode "Starfire's Galaxy" series.
398	33	"Azarath! Metrion! Bookstore!"	Mike Nordstrom	Gene Grillo	October 5, 2024	N/A
On her first day at Trigon's bookstore, Raven discovers Trigon's secret room where he's been working on his autobiography, but opening his autobiography releases ghosts from his past.: Note: The first episode of a five episode series where Raven visits the Azarath Metrion Bookstore.
399	34	"The Great Azarathian Face Off"	Ken McIntyre	Gene Grillo	October 12, 2024	0.10
Famous spell book author MarGarRet persuades the bookstore gang to compete against each other on a reality show for the title of Azarath's Next Top Conjuror.
400	35	"Bookyman"	James Krenzke	Steve Borst	October 19, 2024	N/A
When Trigon claims that nothing scares him, Nana reminds him that he got really scared when she read him a book called "Bookyman". The staff heads to the Children's Books section to find the book.
401	36	"Unleashed"	James Krenzke	Steve Borst	October 26, 2024	N/A
Trigon shows the staff that he now rules the planet Acmetropolis, home of the Loonatics.
402	37	"Original Idea"	Ken McIntyre	Steve Borst	November 2, 2024	N/A
Trigon claims that he controls everything in the bookstore. Nana counters by showing the staff the Public Domain, a magical island where books can run free.
403	38	"Attention to Detail"	Mike Nordstrom	Gene Grillo & Brady Klosterman	November 9, 2024	N/A
While hiding out from an unknown threat, the Titans watch videos of old adventures and notice that sometimes body parts and props are missing.
404	39	"The Ranch"	James Krenzke	Steve Borst & Brady Klosterman	November 16, 2024	N/A
The Titans help the crew behind the series move out of the Warner Brothers Ranch into a brand new facility.: Note: The crew behind the series returns in animated form.; Note: The episode refers to the real life closing of the Warner Brothers Ranch studio.
405	40	"TV Knight 9"	Ken McIntyre	Ken McIntyre	November 23, 2024	N/A
Batman and Commissioner Gordon fight with Alfred over TV time.
406	41	"Four Hundred"	Peter Rida Michail	Matt Chapman	November 30, 2024	N/A
407	42	"Four Hundred"	Peter Rida Michail	Matt Chapman	November 30, 2024	N/A
When the Teen Titans win the award for DC's longest running series, an outraged Superman banishes them to a stop motion universe, hoping their show will get cancelled due to the high production costs of stop motion.

=== Season 9 (2025–26) ===
No. overall	No. in season	Title	Directed by	Written by	Original release date	U.S. viewers (millions)
408	1	"Stickiest Situation"	James Krenzke	Ben Gruber	March 1, 2025	N/A
Sticky Joe has another adventure encountering many DC Comics characters (and other Warner Brothers characters) when he pursues his right boot after accidentally dropping it at a very important party for him.
409	2	"O.S.H.A."	Mike Nordstrom	Ben Gruber	March 1, 2025	N/A
The Titans have 12 hours to clean their incredibly filthy tower before an inspection by OSHA.
410	3	"Teen? Titans"	Mike Nordstrom	Ben Gruber	March 8, 2025	N/A
The Titans are thrown into chaos when they discover that they're all too old, or too young, to be teens.
411	4	"Moonlighting"	Mike Nordstrom	Brady Klosterman	March 15, 2025	N/A
The Titans visit "Dr. MoonLight's Job Clinic", where Dr. Moon and Dr. Light assign them second jobs that severely compromise their ability to be superheroes.
412	5	"Freak Show"	James Krenzke	Brady Klosterman	March 22, 2025	N/A
Control Freak lures the Titans into his secret lair, located in his mother's basement, and then berates them for not being anything like the Titans from the 2003 series.
413	6	"Diner Means Breakfast"	Ken McIntyre	Jordan Morris	March 29, 2025	N/A
Every order Cyborg makes at the Time Trapper Chrono Diner leads to catastrophe. But Cyborg can reset time by yelling, "Chrono Diner!".
414	7	"High Five"	Mike Nordstrom	Morgan Evans	April 5, 2025	N/A
415	8	"Teen Titans and the Easter Factory"	Ken McIntyre	Morgan Evans	April 12, 2025	N/A
416	9	"Passive Income"	Mike Nordstrom	Jordan Morris	April 19, 2025	N/A
417	10	"Winged Warriors"	Ken McIntyre	Brady Klosterman	April 26, 2025	N/A
418	11	"Closed Circuit"	James Krenzke	Gene Grillo	May 3, 2025	N/A
419	12	"Best Mom Ever"	Mike Nordstrom	Brady Klosterman	May 10, 2025	N/A
420	13	"DC Comic Book Club"	Ken McIntyre	Jordan Morris	May 17, 2025	N/A
421	14	"Favorite Animated Show Nominee"	Ken McIntyre	Gene Grillo	June 21, 2025	N/A
422	15	"Them Jaws"	James Krenzke	Brady Klosterman	July 19, 2025	N/A
423	16	"Pool Shark"	Mike Nordstrom	Matt Chapman	July 19, 2025	N/A
424	17	"Shark Tank"	Ken McIntyre	Gene Grillo	July 19, 2025	N/A
425	18	"Lakeside Story"	James Krenzke	Gene Grillo	July 19, 2025	N/A
426	19	"Megalodon Jackson"	Ken McIntyre	Ben Gruber	July 19, 2025	N/A
427	20	"DC Leader Swap"	Ken McIntyre	Brady Klosterman	August 30, 2025	N/A
428	21	"Shhhh"	Ken McIntyre	Matty White	August 30, 2025	N/A
429	22	"Crime Alert"	Ken McIntyre	Brady Klosterman	September 6, 2025	N/A
430	23	"Mani-Pedi"	Mike Nordstrom	Gene Grillo	September 13, 2025	N/A
431	24	"Not a Halloween Special"	James Krenzke	Gene Grillo	September 20, 2025	N/A
After refusing to do the annual Halloween special, the Titans have to face off against a pixel out to get them, sent by Cartoon Network.
432	25	"Chowda"	James Krenzke	Gene Grillo	September 27, 2025	N/A
433	26	"Activate"	Ken McIntyre	Morgan Evans	October 4, 2025	N/A
434	27	"Ice Cold"	Mike Nordstrom	Jordan Morris	October 11, 2025	N/A
435	28	"Cake!"	Mike Nordstrom	Matty Smith	October 18, 2025	N/A
436	29	"Unmasking - The Teen Titans Story"	James Krenzke	Brady Klosterman	October 25, 2025	N/A
437	30	"Helmet of Doom"	Ken McIntyre	Brady Klosterman	November 1, 2025	N/A
438	31	"Bro, Where's the Batmobile?"	Luke Cormican	Brady Klosterman	November 8, 2025	N/A
439	32	"White Elephant"	James Krenzke	Brady Klosterman	November 15, 2025	N/A
440	33	"Ruler's Rule"	James Krenzke	Gene Grillo	November 22, 2025	N/A
441	34	"Hero Hotline"	Ken McIntyre	Jordan Morris	November 29, 2025	N/A
442	35	"Elseworlds"	Luke Cormican	Marly Halpern-Graser	February 7, 2026	N/A
443	36	"Use It or Lose It"	Ken McIntyre	Jordan Morris	February 14, 2026	N/A
444	37	"Task Force X"	Luke Cormican	Brady Klosterman	February 21, 2026	N/A
445	38	"Philly"	James Krenzke	Ben Gruber	February 28, 2026	N/A
446	39	"Torso Soap"	Ken McIntyre	Gene Grillo	March 7, 2026	N/A
447	40	"Select Your Trek"	James Krenzke	Jordan Morris	March 14, 2026	N/A
448	41	"Huzzah for the Turkey Leg"	Luke Cormican	Morgan Evans	July 18, 2026	N/A
449	42	"The Joker's on You"	Luke Cormican	Gene Grillo	July 25, 2026	N/A
450	43	"TV Knight 10"	Luke Cormican & David Gemmill	David Gemmill	August 1, 2026	N/A
451	44	"A Time to Sew"	Luke Cormican	Gene Grillo	August 8, 2026	N/A
452	45	"Teen Titans Go to the Repair Shop"	Ken McIntyre	Gene Grillo	August 15, 2026	N/A
453	46	"Teen Titans Go to the Repair Shop"	Ken McIntyre	Gene Grillo	August 22, 2026	N/A
454	47	"Fishing!!!"	Luke Cormican	Branko Kljajic	August 29, 2026	N/A
455	48	"The Reason Why Things Change"	Luke Cormican	Brady Klosterman	September 5, 2026	N/A
456	49	"Hollywood Squares"	Luke Cormican	Ben Gruber	September 12, 2026	N/A
457	50	"The Night Begins to Shine - Vinyl City"	TBA	TBA	November 28, 2026	TBD
458	51	"The Night Begins to Shine - Vinyl City"	TBA	TBA	November 28, 2026	TBD
459	52	"The Night Begins to Shine - Vinyl City"	TBA	TBA	November 28, 2026	TBD

== Films ==
Title	Directed by	Written by	Original release date
Teen Titans Go! To the Movies	Peter Rida Michail & Aaron Horvath	Michael Jelenic & Aaron Horvath	July 27, 2018
When all of the superheroes have their own movie, the Titans try to star in their own Teen Titans movie while trying to stop Slade.: Note: This is the first Teen Titans film to be shown in theatres.
Teen Titans Go! vs. Teen Titans	Jeff Mednikow	Marly Halpern-Graser & Jeremy Adams	September 24, 2019
The 2013 and the 2003 Teen Titans work together to stop both Trigons and save the multiverse.: Note: This film is a crossover between Teen Titans Go! and Teen Titans.
Teen Titans Go! See Space Jam	Peter Rida Michail	Brady Klosterman	June 20, 2021
The Nerdlucks come to visit the Teen Titans to show them the movie Space Jam, which they have never seen except Cyborg.: Note: This film is a crossover between Teen Titans Go! and Space Jam as a way to promote Space Jam: A New Legacy.
Teen Titans Go! & DC Super Hero Girls: Mayhem in the Multiverse	Matt Peters & Katie Rice	Jase Ricci	May 24, 2022
When Lex Luthor unites a team of supervillains and captures the world's superheroes, the Super Hero Girls must find the heroes and stop the villains, with a little help from the Teen Titans.: Note: This film is a crossover between Teen Titans Go! and DC Super Hero Girls.; Note: This counts as their third crossover following Space House.; Note: This film also serves as the series finale of DC Super Hero Girls.

== Specials ==
=== Top of the Titans (2018) ===
This is a series of clip show specials which are framed as "top 10"-style countdowns hosted by Birdarang in four episodes and Robin in "Best Rivals".

No.	Title	Original release date	U.S. viewers (millions)
1	"Top of the Titans: Raddest Songs"	April 27, 2018	N/A
Birdarang counts down the top 12 "raddest" songs from the show.: 1. The Night Begins to Shine – "40%, 40%, 20%"; 2. Straight Buggin' – "TV Knight 2"; 3. Uncle Jokes Rap – "Uncle Jokes"; 4. Sour Grapes – "The Streak"; 5. Pee Pee Dance – "Serious Business"; 6. Boys Boys/Girls Girls – "Boys vs. Girls"; 7. Cool School Song – "Cool School"; 8. Take It Down Low – "Fish Water"; 9. Booty Scooty Dance – "Booty Scooty"; 10. Forever Mine – "The Night Begins to Shine Chapter 3: Playing Hard to Get"; 11. Crane Kick – "Hey You, Don't Forget About Me in Your Memory"; 12. HARD! – "TV Knight 2"
2	"Top of the Titans: Best Love Songs"	May 4, 2018	0.79
Birdarang counts down the top nine love songs from the show.: 1. BBRae – "BBRAE"; 2. Shining Like Diamonds – "Justice League's Next Top Talent Idol Star"; 3. Don't Fiddle With It – "BBRAE"; 4. Pain – "Little Buddies"; 5. Peace and Love – "Breakfast Cheese"; 6. Fade Away – "Be Mine"; 7. Grrl Ur So Uhmayzeen – "How 'Bout Some Effort"; 8. Jinx – "Opposites"; 9. Shrimps and Prime Rib Song – "Shrimps and Prime Rib"
3	"Top of the Titans: Beast Boy & Cyborg Songs"	May 11, 2018	0.62
Birdarang counts down the top 14 Beast Boy and Cyborg songs from the show.: 1. Catchin' Villains – "TV Knight 2"; 2. Real Real Boy – "Real Boy Adventures"; 3. Livin' that Leprechaun Life – "The Gold Standard"; 4. Raven for Prom Queen – "Demon Prom"; 5. My Book – "Books"; 6. Pancake Appreciation Song – "Yearbook Madness"; 7. She's Gonna Eat It – "Meatball Party"; 8. Burger vs. Burrito Song – "Burger vs. Burrito"; 9. I Love Pie – "Pie Bros"; 10. Waffles Song – "Waffles"; 11. Stakeout – "I See You"; 12. My Bro –"Career Day"; 13. Got Go! – "Island Adventures Part 4: Crazy Desire Island"; 14. Pyramid Mummy Money – "Pyramid Scheme"
4	"Top of the Titans: Dance Party"	May 18, 2018	0.64
Birdarang counts down the top 13 dance party songs from the show.: 1. Crack that Cookie – "Accept the Next Proposition You Hear"; 2. Raven's Justice League Audition – "Justice League's Next Top Talent Idol Star"; 3. Awesome America! – "Hot Salad Water"; 4. Spaghetti Dance – "I'm the Sauce"; 5. Hat Party – "Girls' Night Out"; 6. Last Breath – "Salty Codgers"; 7. Chemistry – "Permanent Record"; 8. Beast Boy vs. Mammoth Break Dance Battle – "The H.I.V.E. Five"; 9. Whistling 101 – "Mouth Hole"; 10. Raven's Dance – "Legs"; 11. Look at Them Legs – "Leg Day"; 12. Dance Fo' Yo' Bees – "Two Bumble Bees and a Wasp"; 13. I'm a Hot Pepper – "Spice Game"; 14. Work on an Episode - "The Self-Indulgent 200th Episode Spectacular Part 2"
5	"Top of the Titans: Best Rivals"	July 20, 2018	N/A
Robin counts down the top 15 rival moments from the show.: 1. H.I.V.E. – "The H.I.V.E. Five"; 2. Terra – "Two Parter"; 3. Kid Flash – "Multiple Trick Pony"; 4. Speedy – "The Date"; 5. Aqualad – "Pirates"; 6. Brother Blood – "Accept the Next Proposition You Hear"; 7. Killer Moth – "Missing"; 8. Trigon – "Nean"; 9. Dr. Light – "Animals, It's Just a Word!"; 10. The Brain – "Brian"; 11. Santa Claus and the Tooth Fairy – "The Streak"; 12. Darkseid – "Two Parter"; 13. Blackfire – "Mr. Butt"; 14. Ravager (Rose Wilson) – "Cool School"

=== Other ===
No.	Title	Original release date	U.S. viewers (millions)
1	"The Cartoon Network Special Edition: NBA All-Star Slam Dunk Contest Presented by Nike"	February 20, 2022	0.18
The Teen Titans commentate on the 2022 NBA All-Star Slam Dunk Contest.
2	"Cartoon Network Special Edition: NBA All-Star Slam Dunk Contest Presented by Jordan Brand"	February 19, 2023	0.09
The Teen Titans commentate on the 2023 NBA All-Star Slam Dunk Contest.

== Shorts ==
=== Lego Dimensions exclusive episode ===
This special episode was released as part of the Teen Titans Go! packs for Lego Dimensions.

Title	Directed by	Written by	Original release date
"Team Building"	Luke Cormican	Joe Moore	September 12, 2017
The Teen Titans celebrate their LEGO Jump City replica but get sucked into a LEGO Jump City, dealing with a Gremlin invasion. The Powerpuff Girls reveal Mojo Jojo's involvement and ask for help capturing the Gremlins in different dimensions. The Titans embark on individual adventures in various movie-themed worlds: Starfire in The Wizard of Oz, Cyborg with The Goonies, Robin in The Lego Batman Movie, and Beast Boy in Fantastic Beasts. Raven accidentally summons Betelgeuse, leading to a mischievous interdimensional journey that leaves the Powerpuff Girls behind. Eventually, they confront a colossal evil gargoyle created by Raven's magic, controlled by Betelgeuse. The Titans unite, using imaginative creations to battle the gargoyle. Raven's powerful spell defeats it, and Betelgeuse escapes. Back at their tower, Raven confesses to altering their LEGO model to win the contest, leaving Beast Boy and Cyborg in tears.

=== DC FanDome short ===
Title	Original release date
"Ask the Titans"	September 12, 2020
Cyborg, Beast Boy, and Raven answer questions from fans.

== Home media ==
Season	Title	Episode count	Running time (minutes)	Release dates	
Season	Title	Episode count	Running time (minutes)	Region 1	Region 2
Season releases
1	"Mission to Misbehave"	26	289 minutes	March 4, 2014	January 30, 2017
1	"Couch Crusaders"	26	286 minutes	July 29, 2014	—N/a
1	"The Complete First Season" (Blu-ray)	52	578 minutes	April 21, 2015	—N/a
2	"Appetite for Disruption"	26	286 minutes	April 14, 2015	—N/a
2	"House Pests"	26	286 minutes	August 18, 2015	—N/a
3	"Eat, Dance, Punch!"	26	286 minutes	May 31, 2016	—N/a
3	"Get In, Pig Out"	27	298 minutes	January 24, 2017	—N/a
4	"Recess is Over"	26	286 minutes	September 12, 2017	—N/a
4	"Lo-Tech Heroes"	26	281 minutes	October 9, 2018	—N/a
5	"Lookin for a Fight"	26		August 13, 2019	—N/a
Separate releases
"Holiday Collection"		9	97 minutes	October 24, 2017	—N/a
"Be My Valentine"		11	121 minutes	January 9, 2018	—N/a
"Robin and Friends"		8	85–88 minutes	February 6, 2018	July 16, 2018
"Cyborg and Friends"		8	84–88 minutes	February 6, 2018	July 16, 2018
"Starfire and Friends"		8	85–89 minutes	February 6, 2018	July 16, 2018
"Raven and Friends"		8	84–88 minutes	February 6, 2018	July 16, 2018
"Beast Boy and Friends"		8	87–89 minutes	February 6, 2018	July 16, 2018
"Pumped for Spring"		9	100 minutes	March 6, 2018	—N/a
