= Michael Jelenic =

American animator and director

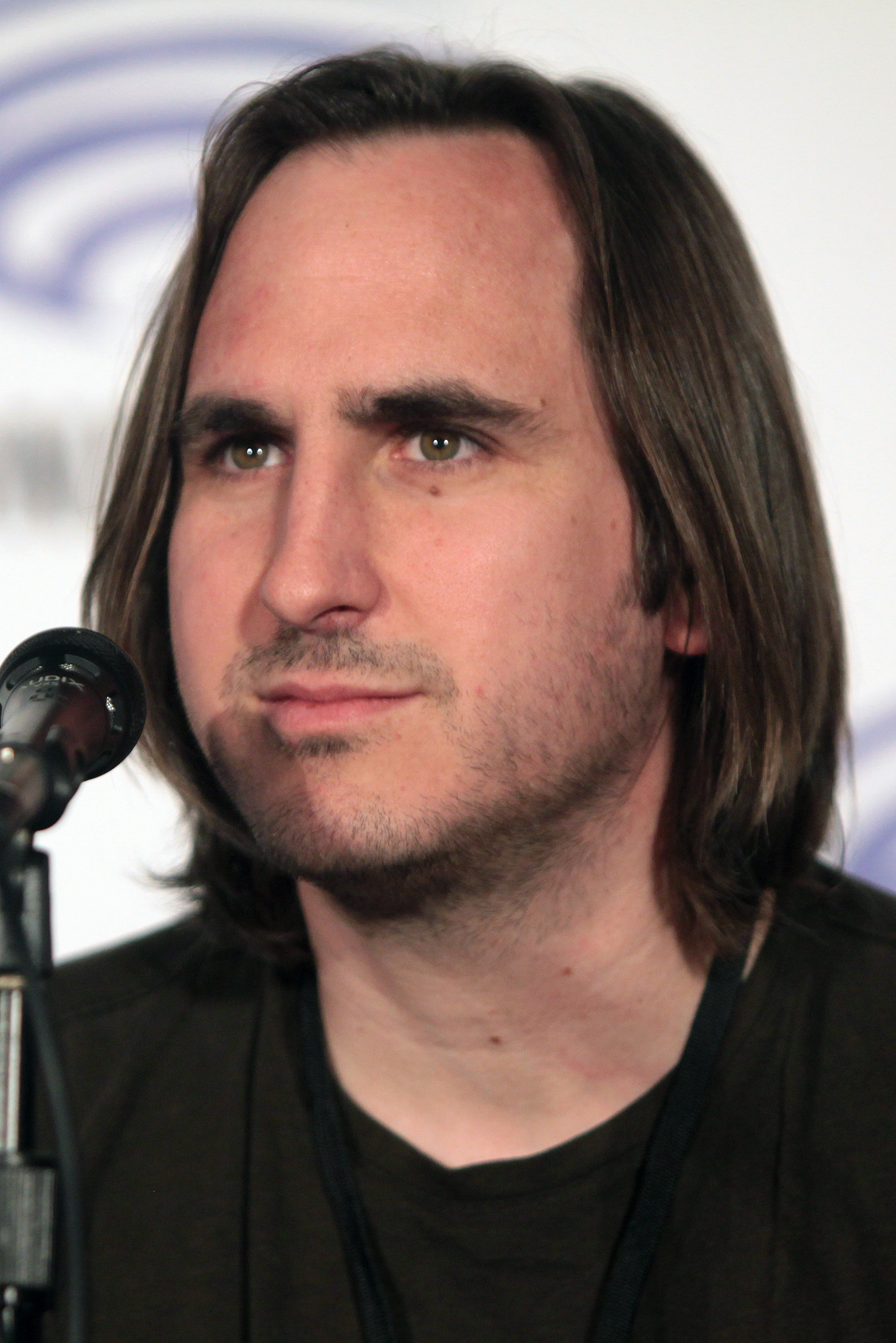
- Jelenic at the 2016 WonderCon
- Born: Michael Christopher Jelenic; Los Angeles County, California, U.S.
- Occupations: Animator; storyboard artist; screenwriter; producer; director
- Years active: 2000–present
- Spouse: Maggie Martin
- Children: 3
- Father: Albert Jelenic

Michael Christopher Jelenic is an American animator, storyboard artist, screenwriter, producer, and director. He is best known for co-developing the animated series Teen Titans Go! (2013–present) alongside Aaron Horvath for Cartoon Network, which has lasted 456 episodes, as well as co-writing and co-producing the feature film Teen Titans Go! To the Movies (2018) and co-directing The Super Mario Bros. Movie (2023) and its sequel The Super Mario Galaxy Movie (2026) with Horvath. He also developed Batman: The Brave and the Bold (2008–2011) with James Tucker and the 2011 TV series ThunderCats with Ethan Spaulding, which both aired on Cartoon Network and were made by Warner Bros. Animation.

== Personal life ==
Jelenic has four siblings and is of Croatian descent. His father Albert was from the village of Ždrelac and emigrated to the United States in 1965 to study engineering. He is married to Maggie Martin Jelenic, vice president of creative marketing for film and television at Sony Music Publishing, and has three children. His daughter Juliet Jelenic cameos in The Super Mario Bros. Movie and its sequel as the voice of Lumalee.

== Filmography ==
=== Film ===
Year	Title	Director	Writer	Producer	Other	Notes
2005	The Batman vs. Dracula	No	No	No	Yes	Script coordinator Story editor
2009	Wonder Woman	No	Yes	No	No	
2010	DC Showcase Original Shorts Collection	No	Yes	No	No	
2015	Lego DC Comics Super Heroes: Justice League vs. Bizarro League	No	Yes	No	No	
2016	Batman: Return of the Caped Crusaders	No	Yes	Yes	No	
2017	Batman vs. Two-Face	No	Yes	Yes	No	
2018	Scooby-Doo! & Batman: The Brave and the Bold	No	No	Yes	No	
2018	Teen Titans Go! To the Movies	No	Yes	Yes	Yes	Songwriter
2019	Teen Titans Go! vs. Teen Titans	No	No	Executive	No	
2023	The Super Mario Bros. Movie	Yes	No	No	No	Directorial debut
2026	The Super Mario Galaxy Movie	Yes	No	No	No	

=== Television ===
Year	Title	Director	Writer	Producer	Storyboard artist	Other	Notes
2000	Men in Black: The Series	No	No	No	Yes	No	
2000–2004	Jackie Chan Adventures	No	Yes	No	Yes	No	Storyboard artist (2000–2002); Writer (2002–2004)
2004–2007	The Batman	No	Yes	No	Yes	No	Storyboard artist (2004–2007); Writer (2005–2006)
2007	Ben 10	No	Yes	No	No	No	Episode: "Perfect Day"
2007–2008	Legion of Super Heroes	No	Yes	No	Yes	No	
2008–2011	Batman: The Brave and the Bold	No	Yes	Yes	Yes	Yes	Developer (with James Tucker); Written two episodes, "Mayhem of the Music Meister!" and "The Rise of the Blue Beetle!" (2008–2009); Lyrics (2009)
2011–2012	ThunderCats	No	Yes	Yes	Yes	No	Developer (with Ethan Spaulding); Written one episode: "The Sword of Omens"
2013–present	Teen Titans Go!	Yes	Yes	Yes	No	No	Developer (with Aaron Horvath); Writer; Producer (season 1–3); Executive producer (season 4–present); Directed one episode: "The Cape"; Voice actor: Himself (2017)
2014	Elf: Buddy's Musical Christmas	No	Yes	Yes	No	No	Television special
2015	Be Cool, Scooby-Doo!	No	No	Supervising	Yes	No	
2020	ThunderCats Roar	No	No	Consulting	No	No	

=== Shorts ===
Year	Title	Writer	Producer	Notes
2010	DC Showcase: The Spectre	Yes	No	Direct-to-video short film
2010	Superman/Shazam!: The Return of Black Adam	Yes	No	Direct-to-video short film
2011	Snarf in "Butterfly Blues"	No	Yes	Television short film
