= Teen Titans Go! =

American animated television series

- Genre: Action-adventure; Comedy; Superhero
- Created by: Michael Jelenic; Aaron Horvath
- Based on: Teen Titans by DC Comics
- Developed by: Michael Jelenic; Aaron Horvath
- Showrunners: Michael Jelenic; Aaron Horvath
- Voices of: Scott Menville; Hynden Walch; Khary Payton; Tara Strong; Greg Cipes (S1–9)
- Theme music composer: Andy Sturmer (remixed by Mix Master Mike)
- Opening theme: "Teen Titans Theme (Mix Master Mike Remix)" by Puffy AmiYumi
- Composers: Armen Chakmakian; Jason Brandt
- Country of origin: United States
- Original language: English
- No. of seasons: 9
- No. of episodes: 456 (list of episodes)

Production
- Executive producers: Sam Register; Aaron Horvath (S4–); Michael Jelenic (S4–); Peter Rida Michail (s5e50–)
- Producers: Aaron Horvath (S1–3); Michael Jelenic (S1–3); Peter Rida Michail (S3–5); Peggy Regan (S4–); Luke Cormican (s5e50–)
- Running time: 11 minutes
- Production companies: DC Entertainment; Warner Bros. Animation

Original release
- Network: Cartoon Network
- Release: April 23, 2013 – present

Related
- Teen Titans; The Night Begins to Shine

Teen Titans Go! is an American animated series developed for Cartoon Network. It premiered on April 23, 2013, and is based on DC Comics' fictional superhero team the Teen Titans and DC Nation's New Teen Titans shorts. The production companies of the series are DC Entertainment and Warner Bros. Animation, with the animation outsourced to Canada at Copernicus Studios and Bardel Entertainment.

Sporting a different animation style, Teen Titans Go! serves as a comedic standalone spin-off with little to no continuity to the original Teen Titans series (although some references are included as comedic fan service) or any other media in the DC Comics franchise. Many DC characters make cameo appearances and are referenced in the background. The original principal voice cast returns to reprise their respective roles. This series explores what the Titans do when they are hanging out around the tower.

A feature film, Teen Titans Go! To the Movies, was released in theaters on July 27, 2018. A ninth season consisting of 52 episodes premiered in March 2025. A tenth season of the series is in development.

== Plot ==
Teen Titans Go! follows the adventures of the young Titans: Beast Boy, Robin, Cyborg, Raven, and Starfire. They reside in Jump City when they are not saving the world while living together as teenagers without adults. Unlike most of the other superhero series, the situations are comic, crazy and parodic—for example, juvenile jokes that reach new heights of danger, obtaining a license to drive after destroying the Batmobile or washing the suits after staining them when fighting their enemies. The show regularly features characters who have appeared in the original series, albeit with reduced roles or exaggerated personalities. It also features greater attachment to the DC Universe at large, with more references to other characters including those in the Justice League, plus a few appearances by Batman and Commissioner Gordon in lighthearted moments.

The show expresses in-jokes regarding the whole of DC's library, many of them in blink-and-you'll-miss-it moments, as well as numerous jokes at the expense of the show itself.

== Episodes ==
The first eight episodes of the series were originally produced by Warner Bros. Animation in pairs of 22 minutes each, two 11-minute stories sharing one intro and end credits sequence. Starting with "Ghostboy", however, the crew started producing each individual episode on its own, the series being generally treated today as a quarter-hour show.

The international masters of the first and second seasons were still edited to have the episodes in pairs.

Season	Episodes	Originally released	
Season	Episodes	First released	Last released
1	52	April 23, 2013	June 5, 2014
2	52	June 12, 2014	July 30, 2015
3	53	July 31, 2015	October 13, 2016
4	52	October 20, 2016	June 25, 2018
5	52	June 25, 2018	April 4, 2020
6	52	October 4, 2019	May 1, 2021
7	52	January 8, 2021	September 16, 2022
8	42	October 7, 2022	November 30, 2024
9	52	March 1, 2025	November 28, 2026

== Characters ==
Main cast members
Scott Menville	Tara Strong	Hynden Walch	Khary Payton	Greg Cipes
**Robin**, Speedy, Billy Numerous, Birdarang, Detective Chimp, Killer Moth, Robin (Tim Drake), Robin (Carrie Kelley), Brain, additional voices	**Raven**, Silkie, Jayna, Batgirl, Butterbean, additional voices	**Starfire**, Blackfire, Madame Rouge, Sparkleface, additional voices	**Cyborg**, Zan, Sticky Joe, Couch Spirit, Universe Tree, Halloween Spirit, additional voices	**Beast Boy** (seasons 1–9), Puppet Wizard, additional voices

NOTE: Main characters' names were bolded.

== Home media ==
=== Region 1 DVDs ===
==== Main series ====
Region 1
Season	DVD title	Episode count	Aspect ratio	Total running time	Release date
1	"Mission to Misbehave"	26	16:9	289 minutes	March 4, 2014
1	"Couch Crusaders"	26	16:9	286 minutes	July 29, 2014
2	"Appetite for Disruption"	26	16:9	286 minutes	April 14, 2015
2	"House Pests"	26	16:9	286 minutes	August 18, 2015
3	"Eat, Dance, Punch!"	26	16:9	286 minutes	May 31, 2016
3	"Get In, Pig Out"	27	16:9	298 minutes	January 24, 2017
4	"Recess Is Over"	26	16:9	286 minutes	September 12, 2017
4	"Lo-Tech Heroes"	26	16:9	281 minutes	October 9, 2018
5	"Lookin' for a Fight"	26	16:9	279 minutes	August 13, 2019
5	"Smells Like Magic"	25	16:9	275 minutes	March 2, 2020

==== Compilations ====
Region 1
DVD title	Episode count	Aspect ratio	Total running time	Release date
"Holiday Collection"	9	16:9	97 minutes	October 24, 2017
"Be My Valentine"	11	16:9	121 minutes	January 9, 2018
"Robin and Friends"	8	16:9	88 minutes	February 6, 2018
"Cyborg and Friends"	8	16:9	88 minutes	February 6, 2018
"Starfire and Friends"	8	16:9	89 minutes	February 6, 2018
"Raven and Friends"	8	16:9	88 minutes	February 6, 2018
"Beast Boy and Friends"	8	16:9	89 minutes	February 6, 2018
"Pumped for Spring"	9	16:9	100 minutes	March 6, 2018
"Teen Titans Go! and Friends Collection"	40	16:9	442 minutes	February 5, 2019

=== Blu-ray ===
==== Main series ====
Region 1
Season(s)	Blu-ray title	Episode count	Aspect ratio	Total running time	Release date
1	"The Complete First Season"	52	16:9	578 minutes	April 21, 2015

=== Region 2 DVDs ===
==== Main series ====
Region 2
Season	DVD title	Episode count	Aspect ratio	Total running time	Release date
1	"Mission to Misbehave" (Season 1, Part 1)	26	16:9	274 minutes	January 30, 2017

==== Compilations ====
Region 2
DVD title	Episode count	Aspect ratio	Total running time	Release date
"Robin and Friends"	8		85 minutes	July 16, 2018
"Cyborg and Friends"	8		84 minutes	July 16, 2018
"Starfire and Friends"	8		85 minutes	July 16, 2018
"Raven and Friends"	8		84 minutes	July 16, 2018
"Beast Boy and Friends"	8		87 minutes	July 16, 2018

== Reception ==
Teen Titans Go! has received generally mixed reviews from critics. Common Sense Media gave the show 4 out of 5 stars and wrote that it "manages a few positive messages alongside the clever comedy and characterizations". IGN writer Scott Collura gave the pilot episode a score of 7.8 out of 10, stating that "DC Animation revamps the beloved Teen Titans series for a new generation – with pretty fun results". Randy Schiff of The Buffalo News praised its writing and animation, calling it a "consistently quirky comedy that is often laced with keen social commentary". After the trailer for the series' film adaptation was released, Scott Mendelson of Forbes praised the series and its "nihilistic madness", writing that "taken on its own terms, it is blisteringly funny and endlessly clever, offering grimly cynical history lessons, comedically grimdark holiday specials, and occasional pure fantasy freak-outs...amid some serious superhero genre trolling and self-commentary". The first season holds a critical approval rating of 67% based on 9 reviews on review aggregator Rotten Tomatoes.

Writing for Slant Magazine, Lee Wang gave the show 2 stars out of 4, saying "Teen Titans Go! would offer little to even the most ardent Titans nostalgists and completists". Aaron Wiseman of Moviepilot cited various criticisms of the show, noting slight appreciation for the characters of Starfire and Raven. The show's pilot episode brought in over 3 million viewers. Cartoon Network renewed Teen Titans Go! for a second season in June 2013, citing successful ratings. According to Hope King, a tech reporter for CNN Business, Teen Titans Go! was one out of three of the most viewed television shows (the other two being Shades of Blue and Game of Thrones) and other media to contribute to a record setting 1.3 million simultaneous Xfinity On-Demand viewings during the January 2016 United States blizzard.

=== Nominations ===
Year	Award	Category	Nominee	Result
2013	Behind the Voice Actors Awards	Best Female Lead Vocal Performance in a Television Series - Comedy/Musical	Hynden Walch as Starfire	Nominated
2013	Behind the Voice Actors Awards	Best Female Lead Vocal Performance in a Television Series - Comedy/Musical	Tara Strong as Raven	Nominated
2013	Behind the Voice Actors Awards	Best Female Vocal Performance in a Television Series in a Guest Role - Comedy/Musical	Tara Strong as Jayna	Nominated
2013	Behind the Voice Actors Awards	Best Vocal Ensemble in a New Television Series	Teen Titans Go! Ensemble	Nominated
2014	Annie Award	Best Animated TV/Broadcast Production For Children's Audience	Teen Titans Go!	Nominated
2015	Kids' Choice Awards	Favorite Cartoon	Teen Titans Go!	Nominated
2016	Kids' Choice Awards	Favorite Cartoon	Teen Titans Go!	Nominated
2017	Kids' Choice Awards	Favorite Cartoon	Teen Titans Go!	Nominated
2017	Primetime Emmy Award	Outstanding Short-Format Animated Program	For "Orangins"	Nominated
2017	Screen Nova Scotia Awards	Best Animated Television Show	Teen Titans Go!	Nominated
2018	Kids' Choice Awards	Favorite Cartoon	Teen Titans Go!	Nominated
2018	Primetime Emmy Award	Outstanding Short-Format Animated Program	For "The Self-Indulgent 200th Episode Spectacular! Pt. 1 and Pt. 2"	Nominated
2019	PGA Awards	Outstanding Children's Program	Teen Titans Go!	Nominated
2019	Kids' Choice Awards	Favorite Cartoon	Teen Titans Go!	Nominated
2019	Primetime Emmy Award	Outstanding Short-Format Animated Program	For "Nostalgia Is Not A Substitute For An Actual Story"	Nominated
2019	British Academy Children's Awards	International Animation	Teen Titans Go!	Won
2020	Kids' Choice Awards	Favorite Animated Series	Teen Titans Go!	Nominated
2021	Kids' Choice Awards	Favorite Animated Series	Teen Titans Go!	Nominated
2022	Kids' Choice Awards	Favorite Animated Series	Teen Titans Go!	Nominated
2023	Kids' Choice Awards	Favorite Animated Series	Teen Titans Go!	Nominated
2024	Kids' Choice Awards	Favorite Animated Series	Teen Titans Go!	Nominated
2025	Children's and Family Emmy Awards	Outstanding Voice Performer in a Children's or Young Teen Program	Eric Bauza as Daffy Duck & Bugs Bunny for "Warner Bros. 100th Anniversary"	Won
2025	Kids' Choice Awards	Favorite Cartoon	Teen Titans Go!	Nominated
2026	Kids' Choice Awards	Favorite Cartoon	Teen Titans Go!	Nominated

== In other media ==
=== Video games ===
Teeny Titans is a mobile game developed by Grumpyface Studios and released on June 22, 2016.

Teen Titans Go! content is featured as part of the toys-to-life video game Lego Dimensions, via two packs released in September 2017. These include a Team Pack containing Beast Boy and Raven minifigures and constructible T-Car and Spellbook of Azarath items; and a Fun pack containing a Starfire minifigure and constructible Titan Robot. The characters are able to access a Teen Titans Go!-themed Adventure World featuring locations from the series, as well as an exclusive episode themed after the game. Additionally, the pre-existing minifigures of Cyborg from DC Comics and Robin from The Lego Batman Movie are able to turn into their Teen Titans Go! counterparts when used in the Teen Titans Go! Adventure World.

=== Films ===
==== Theatrical film ====
A theatrical film adaptation of the series was released by Warner Bros. Pictures on July 27, 2018. Titled Teen Titans Go! To the Movies, the film was written by series creatives Aaron Horvath and Michael Jelenic, and directed by Horvath and fellow producer Peter Rida Michail. The voice cast of the TV series reprise their roles, with Will Arnett and Kristen Bell also starring.

==== DTV films ====
A second film titled Teen Titans Go! vs. Teen Titans was released directly to home media on September 24, 2019.

A third film titled Teen Titans Go! See Space Jam aired on Cartoon Network on June 20, 2021. The film features the Titans commenting over the film Space Jam as a way to promote Space Jam: A New Legacy.

A fourth film titled Teen Titans Go! & DC Super Hero Girls: Mayhem in the Multiverse, was released directly to home media on May 24, 2022.

=== Other crossovers with other DC works ===
==== Young Justice ====
Aqualad, Superboy and Miss Martian from Young Justice appear in the Teen Titans Go! episode "Let's Get Serious".

In the Young Justice: Outsiders episode "Nightmare Monkeys", the animation style of Teen Titans Go! is used in a flashback where Beast Boy hallucinates the deaths of the Doom Patrol.

==== DC Super Hero Girls ====
The main characters from DC Super Hero Girls - Batgirl, Supergirl, Green Lantern, Zatanna, Wonder Woman, and Bumblebee - appear in the Teen Titans Go! crossover episodes "Superhero Feud" and "Space House".

==== Titans ====
The Beast Boy from Teen Titans Go! appears in a cameo appearance in archival footage in the Titans episode "Dude, Where's My Gar?".
