= Aaron Horvath =

American animator

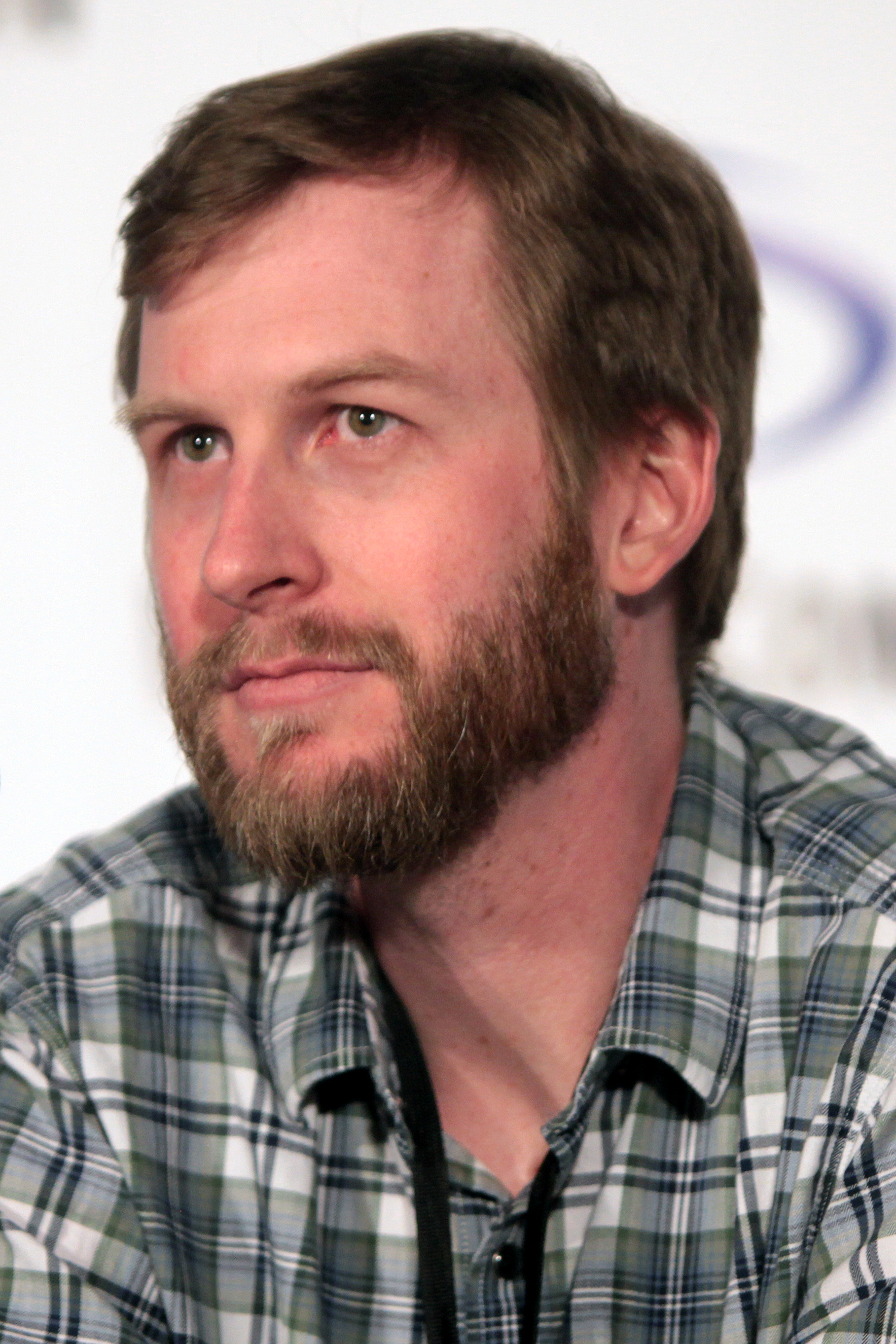
- Horvath at the 2016 WonderCon
- Born: Aaron James Horvath; Orange County, California, U.S.
- Occupations: Animator; storyboard artist; screenwriter; producer; director
- Years active: 2003–present
- Children: 2

Aaron James Horvath is an American animator, storyboard artist, screenwriter, producer, and director. He is best known for developing the animated series Teen Titans Go! (2013–present) alongside Michael Jelenic, as well as directing the feature films Teen Titans Go! To the Movies (2018) along with Peter Rida Michail and The Super Mario Bros. Movie (2023) and its sequel The Super Mario Galaxy Movie (2026) along with Jelenic.

== Filmography ==
=== Film ===
Year	Title	Director	Producer	Writer	Other	Notes
2010	The Drawn Together Movie: The Movie!	No	No	No	Yes	Lead storyboard artist
2018	Teen Titans Go! To the Movies	Yes	Yes	Yes	No	Directorial debut
2019	Teen Titans Go! vs. Teen Titans	No	Executive	No	No	
2023	The Super Mario Bros. Movie	Yes	No	No	No	
2026	The Super Mario Galaxy Movie	Yes	No	No	No	

=== Television ===
Year	Title	Director	Producer	Writer	Animator	Other	Notes
2003	Kid Notorious	No	No	No	No	Yes	Character designer
2005	The Buzz on Maggie	No	No	No	Yes	No	
2007–2008	El Tigre: The Adventures of Manny Rivera	No	No	No	Flash	No	
2008	Cranberry Christmas	No	No	No	Yes	No	
2010–2011	Mad	Yes	No	No	Yes	No	
2013–present	Teen Titans Go!	Yes	Executive	Yes	No	Yes	Developer
2014	Elf: Buddy's Musical Christmas	No	Yes	Yes	No	No	
2017–2020	Unikitty!	No	Supervising	No	No	No	
