= Duela Dent =

Fictional character in the DC Universe

- Promotional artwork of Duela Dent as Joker's Daughter.

Publication information
- Publisher: DC Comics
- First appearance: Batman Family #6 (August 1976)
- Created by: Bob Rozakis

In-story information
- Alter ego: Duela Dent Napier Nigma
- Species: Human
- Team affiliations: Titans East; The Riddler Family; Suicide Squad
- Notable aliases: The Joker's Daughter; Catgirl the Catwoman's Daughter; Scarecrone the Scarecrow's Daughter; Riddler's Daughter; Penguin's Daughter; Harlequin; Card Queen; Joker; Riddler
- Abilities: Skilled martial artist and acrobat; Expert detective; Utilizes various clown-based gadgets

Duela Dent is a fictional character appearing in American comic books published by DC Comics. She is a former member of the Suicide Squad, the Teen Titans and its counterpart, Titans East. Introduced under the alias of the Joker's Daughter, she has also used aliases: Catgirl the Catwoman's Daughter, Scarecrone the Scarecrow's Daughter, the Riddler's Daughter, the Penguin's Daughter, the Card Queen, and the Harlequin. She first appeared in Batman Family #6 (Jul/Aug 1976).

Alessandra Torresani portrayed Duela Dent in the Arrowverse series Batwoman. Olivia Rose Keegan portrays Duela in Gotham Knights.

== Fictional character biography ==
=== Pre-Crisis ===
Duela Dent first appeared as the Joker's Daughter in the Batman Family series of comic books. She gained the attention of Robin (Dick Grayson), as she later claimed to be the daughter of the Catwoman, the Scarecrow, the Riddler and the Penguin. She deduced Robin's identity and he revealed that she was Duela Dent, Two-Face's daughter.

Duela claimed that she wanted to join the Teen Titans to atone for her father's crimes; however, not all of the members of the Titans were in favor of this idea. In Teen Titans #48, she changed her name to the Harlequin. As the Harlequin, Duela utilized gimmicks such as smoke-inducing powder puffs and bullet-firing lipstick.

After the Teen Titans comic books were canceled, she popped up in the Batman titles, calling herself the Card Queen while infiltrating a criminal organization called MAZE.

Duela's last Pre-Crisis appearance is in Tales of The Teen Titans #50, as a guest at Donna Troy's wedding where she appears to be a middle-aged matron. Dick Grayson notes that he had finally realized that she was too old to be Two-Face's daughter; she agrees, then disappears before he can take the matter further.

=== Post-Crisis ===
Delusional and schizophrenic, the mysterious Harlequin has been in and out of mental institutions for several years. An acrobat who possesses numerous "clown-motif" gadgets, she calls herself Duela Dent (while her true identity remains unknown) and acts as an ally to the Titans.

Her first significant Post-Crisis appearance was in the Team Titans comic book, as an aged patient in a mental hospital. The writers of the title originally planned to reveal that Harlequin was a time-traveling member of the Team Titans driven insane by her time-warping experience. However, due to the cancellation of the series, plans for her to return were aborted. The final issue of Team Titans solicited a non-existent story for Team Titans #25 and provided a commentary on the title's cancellation. In the solicitation, Duela steals a reality-altering device and shifts New York City into the late 1970s. Duela's appearance in Team Titans is now regarded as a time glitch caused by Zero Hour: Crisis in Time.

Reappearing at her proper age, the Harlequin aided the Titans during the JLA/Titans: Technis Imperative series, in which Cyborg's automated system seeks out all Titans allies, past and present. Although she is in a mental institution, Duela is rescued by Cyborg and helps battle the Justice League for Cyborg's soul. In the series, she is described as a former Titans ally. Duela then makes a brief appearance in Titans Secret Files and Origins #1, insisting to anyone who would listen that the Titans would soon contact her about membership. In the story, she also claims that she is the daughter of Doomsday.

Duela's next appearance is in Titans Secret Files and Origins #2, in a backup story in which Beast Boy's cousin Matt holds a membership drive for the revived West Coast branch of the Titans, Titans L.A. Harlequin crashes the meeting-turned-party with a small group of villains, including Beast Boy's enemies Fear and Loathing, simply because she has not been invited. Flamebird and Terra defeat her and return her to the Helping House Mental Institution in Industry, California. How she met up with the dangerous villains with whom she crashed the party is unexplained. In the same comic, a feature states that her claims regarding her paternity have been disproved, save one; no further information is provided.

In a short story contained in Teen Titans/Outsiders Secret Files and Origins #2, Duela socializes with several villains at their secret satellite headquarters and makes a series of wild claims regarding her parentage, all of which are dismissed by the nonplussed villains (she claims that she has been resuscitated by a Lazarus Pit and that her mother may actually be the villainous parent).

Duela returned to action alongside the assembled Titans who faced Doctor Light in Teen Titans (vol. 3), and Superboy-Prime in Infinite Crisis #4 and Teen Titans #32. She later appeared in a double-page spread that was added in the Infinite Crisis hardcover collected edition.

==== One Year Later ====
The Joker's Daughter and Enigma both served on the Teen Titans during the lost year. Duela is a member of the splinter group Titans East, with writer Geoff Johns stating: "Yeah. We're going to really get into her. Tony Daniel did an amazing redesign on the Joker's daughter for Titans East".

In Teen Titans #43, Miss Martian and Cyborg arrive at Belle Reve prison to question their former teammate Bombshell, who has betrayed the team. Risk and Batgirl arrive and Batgirl kills Bombshell by slitting her throat with a batarang. Duela and Enigma cut the prison's power supply, allowing the inmates to escape and attack Miss Martian and Cyborg. During the attack, Enigma comments to Duela: "Wait'll dear old daddy gets a load of us!" The two are the captors and tormentors of Raven, whom they torture psychologically. Duela reveals that she joined Titans East simply because they asked. Raven points out that Duela has always been an ally of the Titans and offers her membership on the team. Duela accepts the invitation by punching Enigma and fights alongside the Titans against Titans East. When the battle ends, Duela and Batgirl disappear.

==== Countdown ====
Duela appears in the first issue of Countdown. She abducts a teen celebrity from a nightclub, only to be stopped by Jason Todd. She claims that she comes from an alternate Earth. After escaping, Duela is killed by a Monitor, who states, "This world is not yours. Your presence in it is not tolerated. The penalty is death." When informed of Duela's death, the Joker says that he never had a daughter. The Monitor of New Earth suggests that Duela's father is actually an alternate version of the Joker, indicating "She didn't belong [...] making others think she was the Joker's daughter. Which on that world, she most certainly was not". Dan DiDio, editor-in-chief of DC, has stated that Duela's murder would have a ripple effect throughout the series. Nightwing, Robin, Donna Troy, Wonder Girl and Ravager set out to investigate Duela's death, but their inquiries are cut short by one of the Monitors, who diverts their attention elsewhere.

In Countdown Presents The Search for Ray Palmer: Crime Society it is revealed that Earth-3's heroic version of the Joker, the Jokester, is the father of Duela Dent and that her mother was Evelyn Dent, Three-Face (the Earth-3 version of Two-Face). She was raised by Three-Face and her stepfather, the Earth-3 Riddler, and together the three formed the Riddler Family. When she was finally introduced to her birth father, she dropped cryptic hints implying that she or her consciousness shifts unknowingly from Earth to Earth, which is the source of her parental confusion. When the Jokester joined the Riddler Family, Duela revealed that she had been in a relationship with Talon, Owlman's teenaged sidekick. The Jokester renounced her as his daughter and Duela left with Talon moments before the Crime Society stormed their apartment. The Riddler was killed by Ultraman and Three-Face's arm was torn off by Superwoman; the Jokester managed to flee until he is later tracked down and killed by Solomon, the Monitor who killed Duela.

=== The New 52 ===
In September 2011, The New 52 rebooted DC's continuity. In this new timeline, Duela Dent is re-established in Catwoman #23. The character was featured in the "Villains Month" one-shot comic book, Batman: The Dark Knight #23.4 and, in early 2014, the character was further explored in yet another one-shot. In the aftermath of Death of the Family, in which the Joker seemingly falls to his death, his face (which he previously had cut off) is found by a psychotic young woman living in the sewers. The woman wears the severed flesh as a mask, dubbing herself "the Joker's Daughter". She becomes obsessed with not only serving the Joker, but also with having his blood course inside of her, so she can truly become his "daughter". Refusing to accept the Joker's apparent death, she begins harming, murdering and destroying other people and property, to find him and get his attention. This leads her to the Dollmaker, who is responsible for removing the Joker's face per his request. After making a deal with each other, Dollmaker gives the Joker's Daughter vials of her "father's" blood, so she could inject it into her veins, and he sews the Joker's face onto hers. After failing to find her "father", the Joker's Daughter gives up hope until she receives a note from someone claiming to be the Joker.

During Batman: Eternal, Joker's Daughter participates in the mass scheme against Batman, including attempting to use the spirits of Arkham to 'resurrect' her father in the body of Maxie Zeus-only to summon the spirit of Deacon Blackfire instead-and later confronts Batgirl at the carnival where the Joker took Commissioner Gordon after shooting Barbara (as portrayed in Batman: The Killing Joke).

The Joker later returns in the Endgame storyline, very much alive.

Much to the dismay of fellow member Harley Quinn, the Joker's Daughter is recruited as part of the New Suicide Squad.

Critical and fan reactions to The New 52 version of the Joker's Daughter have been mixed.

== Powers and abilities ==
Duela Dent is an expert at acrobatics and armed combat.

== Villainous parentage ==
Duela Dent has claimed to be the offspring of the following villains:

- Joker
- Catwoman
- Scarecrow
- Riddler
- Penguin
- Two-Face
- Doomsday
- Doctor Light
- Punch and Jewelee

Duela is originally depicted as the daughter of Two-Face and his estranged wife, Gilda Dent. Creator Bob Rozakis stated, "It didn't take too long to decide whose daughter she would turn out to be. After all, the only married villain was Two-Face. I convinced [editor Julius Schwartz and associate editor E. Nelson Bridwell, the acknowledged keeper of DC's historical consistency] that Harvey and Gilda Dent had a daughter, that Harvey had been disappointed because she wasn't a twin, and that they'd named her Duela". Rozakis, upon being asked his thought regarding the current insane version of Duela Dent, who claims to be the daughter of multiple supervillains, replied: "I got a laugh out of it when I first saw it, but I thought they wasted the character. I realize that Marv and company didn't want her around anymore and felt they had to explain her away because of continuity, but they could have just as easily ignored her. Actually, I consider Harley Quinn to be a reincarnation of Duela".

It is later revealed that the Earth-3 hero the Jokester is her biological father and Three-Face, Evelyn Dent, is her mother. Since Evelyn disappeared from Duela's father's life while she was still pregnant, he was not aware of Duela's existence until her teen years. As a result, Duela's stepfather, the Riddler, helped Evelyn raise her. Upon meeting the Joker, Duela started calling herself the Joker's Daughter, even though her real father's hero name was the Jokester.

== Other versions ==
=== Infinite Crisis ===
In Infinite Crisis #6, Alexander Luthor Jr. creates multiple Earths. On Earth-154, Superman and Batman, along with their sons Superman Jr. and Batman Jr. (the Super-Sons), round up two young, female versions of the Joker and Riddler, along with the daughter of Lex Luthor, Ardora.

=== Kingdom Come ===
In Kingdom Come, there is a new Joker's Daughter, identified as both the Joker's Daughter and the Harlequin in annotations for the series and according to Alex Ross.

The Kingdom Come Revelations supplement adds the following: "Along with Batman's apparent influence on others to follow his style, so has the Joker inspired a few to take after his chaotic clown style. The original Joker's Daughter (who actually turned out to be Two-Face's Daughter) was a former member of the Teen Titans and has no direct relation to this new "riot girl" version, nor is there a true familial relation to the Joker".

The Joker's Daughter II is modeled on Jill Thompson, a writer/artist; Thompson is Chicago-based, as is Alex Ross. Austin Loomis adds that Thompson has occasionally drawn herself into stories that she was illustrating for Vertigo.

It is noted throughout this series that the Joker's Daughter II is always quite dour and serious, quite the change from her namesake, and another example of the generational-clash theme of Kingdom Come. Following the death of Von Bach, Ex1Machina points out that the Joker's Daughter II has undergone a drastic makeup change, with a tear tattooed beneath her eye. She is one of the few characters to survive the final battle in #4. She later reappeared in The Kingdom: Offspring #1.

=== Tangent Comics ===
A female version of the Joker appeared as part of DC's Tangent Comics line in her own one-shots (Tangent Comics: The Joker #1 in 1997 and Tangent Comics: The Joker's Wild! #1 in 1998). This Joker bore little resemblance to the traditional interpretation of the character and instead was modeled on Duela Dent.

=== Teen Titans ===
In Teen Titans Go! #41, Killer Moth's daughter Kitten masquerades as the child of numerous other villains. Writer J. Torres confirmed that her motives were inspired by Duela Dent.

=== Tiny Titans ===
Duela Dent frequently appears in the Tiny Titans series as the Joker's Daughter. She often antagonizes Robin, who informs her in Tiny Titans #17 that there are no clowns allowed at his birthday party. On many occasions, she has tried to kiss him. In Tiny Titans #25, she briefly, (though accidentally) becomes a member of the Sinestro Corps when she wears a ring that Starfire buys at a pawn shop. During the Tiny Titans/Little Archie miniseries, she and Little Archie are discovered in the Batcave by Batman. Duela then states she is "looking for Robbie". Batman, assuming that Little Archie is the Joker's son, then calls the Joker and tells him to come over and pick up both his kids.

=== Titans Tomorrow ===
In the Titans Tomorrow storyline (which took place in a possible future), Duela destroyed Arkham Asylum and tried to reconcile with her father, who ignored her. In a fit of rage she killed Batgirl (Cassandra Cain), Alfred Pennyworth and Bette Kane. She was also responsible for doing something to members of the GCPD, specifically Crispus Allen. She again called herself the Joker's Daughter and traded chattering teeth and riddles for more deadly accessories. She was shot to death by Batman IV, Tim Drake of the future. Before she was killed, she hinted that she knew more about him when he was younger.

=== AME-COMI ===
In the Ame-Comi storyline, an alternate universe where all the superheroes and villains are teen and 'tween female counterparts to the Earth One versions, Duela Dent appears as this continuity's "Joker". She is the daughter of Jack "the Joker" Dent, a criminal shot and paralyzed by "Jim Gordon". Duela is Gotham's most dangerous criminal and the main antagonist to this continuity's "Batgirl" and Robin (Carrie Kelly Gordon).

=== Flashpoint ===
In the alternate timeline of the Flashpoint event, Harvey Dent has twin children who are kidnapped by Joker. Chief James Gordon locates Joker with Dent's children in Wayne Manor and goes in without any backup. Gordon is tricked into shooting Dent's daughter, as she has been taped to a chair and disguised as the Joker. The Joker then appears and kills Gordon before Batman arrives. Batman rushes in and manages to save the daughter. Batman then moves them away from the Joker.

=== DC Bombshells ===
In the DC Bombshells continuity, the Joker's Daughter serves under the Third Reich during World War II and helps the Nazi cause by keeping magic users such as Raven and Zatanna under her control. She is eventually defeated by the Bombshells - Raven, Zatanna, and Miri Marvel.

== In other media ==
- Duela Dent appears in the Batwoman episode "Grinning From Ear to Ear", portrayed by Alessandra Torresani. This version is Harvey Dent's niece who previously struggled with self-loathing and became obsessed with making her face "look normal", resulting in her smashing a mirror and using its shards to cut her face. In the present, Duela becomes a serial killer, targeting popular Gotham social media influencers before she is eventually stopped by Batwoman and Sophie Moore. After they leave Duela for the authorities, Alice cuts off her face to use as a disguise for a revenge plot against a mutual enemy of theirs, Ethan Campbell. The GCPD later find a faceless Duela, who says that she is finally "perfect".
- Duela appears in Gotham Knights, portrayed by Olivia Rose Keegan as a teenager and by Elle Lisic as a child. This version is initially believed to be the late Joker's daughter before she is revealed to be Harvey Dent and Jane Doe's daughter and is a criminal acquaintance of Harper and Cullen Row.

== See also ==
- Harlequin
- Enigma the Riddler's Daughter
