= Bette Kane =

DC Comics character

- Bette Kane as Flamebird from Beast Boy #2 (February 2000); art by Justiniano

Publication information
- Publisher: DC Comics
- First appearance: As Bat-Girl: Batman #139 (April 1961); As Flamebird: Secret Origins Annual #3 (1989)
- Created by: Bat-Girl: Bill Finger (writer); Sheldon Moldoff (artist); Flamebird: George Pérez (writer); Tom Grummett (artist)

In-story information
- Full name: Mary Elizabeth "Bette" Kane
- Species: Human
- Team affiliations: Batman Family; Teen Titans; Young Justice
- Partnerships: Batwoman; Dick Grayson; Beast Boy; Kate Kane
- Notable aliases: Bat-Girl; Flamebird; Hawkfire
- Abilities: Highly skilled martial artist; Light blast projection from lenses in mask; Utilizing projectiles and electrified bolas

Mary Elizabeth Kane, better known as Bette Kane, is a superheroine appearing in American comic books published by DC Comics. The character first appeared in the 1960s as "Betty Kane", the Bat-Girl. Her name was later modified to "Bette Kane", and she assumes the role of Flamebird.

In television, she is voiced by Alyson Stoner in the animated series Young Justice and portrayed by Nicole Kang in the live-action series Batwoman.

== Fictional character biography ==
=== Pre-Crisis ===
Betty Kane as Bat-Girl; art by Sheldon Moldoff.

The original Bat-Girl first appeared in Batman #139 (April 1961) as Betty Kane, the niece of Kathy Kane, also known as Batwoman. After discovering her aunt's dual identity, Betty convinced Batwoman to train her as her sidekick.

Batwoman and Bat-Girl were created to be romantic interests for Batman and Robin, respectively, as well as crime-fighting associates. Bat-Girl appeared seven times between 1961 and 1964, but stopped appearing in 1964 along with Batwoman, Ace the Bat-Hound, Bat-Mite, and Vicki Vale when editor Julius Schwartz decided she and other characters did not fit the new direction he intended to take the series. It has been suggested by scholars that the characters of Batwoman (in 1956) and Bat-Girl (in 1961) were introduced in part to refute allegations of homosexuality in Batman comics; specifically, the enduring claim that Batman and Robin were homosexuals.

Later in 1977 Batwoman and Bat-Girl were revived and were regarded to have been inactive for several years. Bat-Girl became a member of the Teen Titans West in Teen Titans #50 (October 1977). However, the original Teen Titans series was cancelled with issue #53 (February 1978) and the Teen Titans, including Teen Titans West, were disbanded. After this, Bat-Girl only appeared two more times during this era; a guest appearance in Batman Family #16 (March 1978), and as one of the attendees at Donna Troy and Terry Long's wedding in Tales of the Teen Titans #50 (February 1985).

=== Post-Crisis ===
In the post-Crisis DC Universe, the character known as Batwoman was erased from existence (although her alter ego, Kathy Kane, was revealed to have existed and was murdered by the League of Assassins). Batwoman's niece, Betty Kane, disappeared as well. Unlike her aunt, Betty's removal from history would not last long.

For a brief time in the 1970s, Betty had joined the west coast version of the Teen Titans under her Bat-Girl moniker. Though "Bat-Girl" does not exist in the post-Crisis universe, her team did; therefore, a new version of the character was necessary. In Secret Origins Annual #3 (1989), the official post-Crisis history of Titans West was revealed. Instead of Betty Kane's Bat-Girl, fans were introduced to a similar character called Mary Elizabeth "Bette" Kane, also known as Flamebird. This was an in-joke, as the team of Nightwing and Flamebird had a history in the Silver Age continuity as guises assumed by Superman and Jimmy Olsen while visiting the bottled city of Kandor in Superman comics.

Bette Kane becomes Flamebird and teams up with her idol, Dick Grayson; art by Phil Jimenez.

Bette was now a very driven and somewhat spoiled Los Angeles debutante and tennis prodigy. After seeing Robin on the news, Bette vowed that she would gain his attention and favor by becoming a masked adventurer herself. Training to Olympic-levels in gymnastics and martial arts, she created the identity of Flamebird (and a costume that resembled her pre-Crisis Bat-Girl identity) and joined Titans West in hopes of catching Robin's eye. While flattered, the driven young hero was not sure how to deal with her obsession and avoided her, much to her dismay. After briefly giving up her heroic persona, Bette found that neither winning tennis tournaments nor achieving perfect grades in school matched the rooftop thrills of the hero biz. She attempted several times to reunite the Titans West team, most notably after a journey into the afterlife with Hawk and Dove, but was unsuccessful. Dove noted that Bette was lonely and desperate for company and contact with others. Bette again gave up her obsession with the Titans until Cyborg collected her, along with all former Titans everywhere, in an attempt to protect his soul from the Justice League. Hoping this would lead to a formal invitation to rejoin the team, Bette was crushed to learn they did not need (or want) her assistance.

A short time later, Beast Boy found himself alone in Los Angeles after the team neglected to ask him back. Landing himself in trouble after an impostor frames him for various crimes, Beast Boy asked former teammate Bette for help. Having been recently chastised for her dedication (or lack thereof) to crime-fighting by Robin (now in his adult Nightwing identity), Flamebird seized the opportunity to better herself and her reputation, becoming more level-headed and boosting her crime-fighting arsenal. However, the design of her outfit as an adult has similarities to that of Dick Grayson's Nightwing outfit, with a red tunic and gold V running across the chest. After Bette helped Beast Boy clear his name, his cousin Matt attempted one last recruitment drive for Titans West, dubbing the ill-fated team Titans L.A. None of the recruits took the event seriously except for insane and uninvited former Titan Duela Dent, who crashed the party and was subdued by Bette. Around the same time, she and Beast Boy both served on an ad hoc Young Justice team, which she hoped would raise their public profiles; however, the team only lasted for one mission. Content to remain a hero on her own, Bette was unheard from until she was captured by a Brainiac-worshipping cult leader in Oregon and eventually rescued by Oracle's covert team of female operatives in Birds of Prey. She fought Doctor Light alongside the majority of heroes who had once been members of the Teen Titans.

==== Infinite Crisis ====
Flamebird appeared in Infinite Crisis #4 to fight Superboy-Prime. In this storyline, it was indicated that Flamebird had originally been the Earth-Two counterpart to Bat-Girl, and that after the Crisis on Infinite Earths, Flamebird had replaced Bat-Girl on the sole remaining Earth. Flamebird, along with most of the Justice Society, disappeared when Earth-Two was reborn. In the Villains United special, Flamebird (and the other heroes who vanished to Earth-Two) had made it back to "New Earth" at some point after Infinite Crisis #6. She was among the many heroes gathered to fight off the invasion of Metropolis by the Society.Teen Titans vol. 3 #38 reveals that Flamebird briefly served on the Titans during the year-long gap.

==== Relationship to Batwoman ====
Following the events of Infinite Crisis, it is revealed that Bette is the cousin of current Batwoman, Kate Kane. In Detective Comics #856, Bette moves to Gotham City to enroll in Gotham University. She encounters her cousin at a party thrown for the Gotham City Police Department, and attempts to chat her up, only to be blown off. According to Kate's father, Bette looks up to her and likes spending time with her. In Detective Comics #862, Bette is seen hunched over on her bed, staring at her Flamebird costume and asking Kate how to "let go of the past". Bette is kidnapped by a crazed serial killer known as the Cutter, and awakens bound and gagged in his workshop. The Cutter plans on removing Bette's ears as part of a plan to create a perfect woman through the use of stolen body parts. Batwoman rescues Bette from the killer and accidentally reveals her identity. At the end of the story, Bette is seen in her Flamebird outfit, telling Kate that she wants to become her new partner. Kate eventually agrees to train Bette, and gives her a capeless grey military outfit and the codename Plebe. Later still, Bette acquires pyrotechnic technology and adopts the codename Hawkfire. As Hawkfire, she tries to rescue cousin Beth Kane from the clutches of the Department of Extranormal Operations, but is herself captured.

A Bat-Girl looking similar to Betty Kane is revealed to have existed in the past in Batman #682, and later reappears in Batman, Inc. #4 (April 2011). As in pre-Crisis continuity, she is the younger protege of the first Batwoman, Kathy Kane (who reappears in post-Infinite Crisis continuity as the original Batwoman, but with a revamped origin). Despite her initial post-Crisis origin retcon, Bette Kane has regained her prior history using the Bat-Girl identity in her younger years prior to becoming Flamebird.

=== DC Rebirth ===
In the DC Rebirth relaunch, Bette has enrolled at the United States Military Academy, seeming to be a yearling, or sophomore, cadet. She keeps in contact with Kate Kane and Julia Pennyworth, and even briefly visits Kate in Gotham.

=== Dawn of DC ===
In Dawn of DC's The Birds and the Bees, Bette is no longer at West Point and has reverted to using the Flamebird mantle. After Hank Hall goes missing in Bialya, Bette reunites the Titans West to rescue Hank and fight Queen Bee. Afterward she tries to make the team permanent again.

== Powers and abilities ==
Flamebird built strength and endurance through athletic training and has worked as a professional tennis player. She also studied several forms of martial arts, specializing in kickboxing. She is a skilled martial artist, but is not depicted as one of DC's most powerful combatants.

Like Robin, Flamebird has a utility belt containing a grappling hook with line, gas grenades, gas mask, flares, flashlight, radio/transmitter, handcuffs, bird-shaped throwing blades (Bird-A-Rangs), and an emergency medical kit. She increased her arsenal by equipping her mask with lenses capable of emitting powerful bursts of blinding light, and created bird-like bolas that can electrocute anyone tangled in them.

As Plebe, Batwoman's sidekick, Bette is stripped of her outfit and gadgetry, wearing a nondescript grey military outfit. Her martial arts prowess continued to improve under Batwoman's tutelage. Later, as Hawkfire, her costume features gold plated elements and she carries a wrist-mounted flamethrowing device.

Since enrolling at West Point, she would have received the same sort of military training conducted there, which among other things would require instruction in firearms, boxing, Modern Army Combatives, and battlefield tactics.

== Other versions ==
Flamebird assumes the mantle of Batwoman; art by Mike McKone.

- Bette Kane / Bat-Girl, based on her Silver Age depiction, makes a minor appearance in Batman: Whatever Happened to the Caped Crusader?.
- A possible future incarnation of Bette Kane / Flamebird appears in "Titans Tomorrow", in which Tim Drake / Batman uses a Lazarus Pit to resurrect her after Duela Dent killed her. Following this, Kane assumes the alias of Batwoman and becomes Drake's partner and lover until he leads the Teen Titans in taking over the Western United States. In response, she joins the Titans who oppose his rule in forming Titans East.
- Bette Kane appears in DC Comics Bombshells.
- Bette Kane / Flamebird appears in Teen Titans Go! as a member of Titans North.
- Bette Kane as Bat-Girl makes a cameo appearance in All-New Batman: The Brave and the Bold #13.
- Bette Kane appears in issue #20 of the Young Justice TV series tie-in comic book.

== In other media ==
=== Television ===
- Bette Kane appears in the Young Justice episode "Homefront", voiced by Alyson Stoner. This version is a Gotham Academy student and liaison to Artemis Crock.
- A character based on Mary Elizabeth Kane named Mary Hamilton appears in Batwoman, portrayed by Nicole Kang. She is Kate Kane's step-sister.
