= Misfit (DC Comics) =

- Misfit as depicted in Birds of Prey #101 (February 2007), art by Nicola Scott.

Publication information
- Publisher: DC Comics
- First appearance: Birds of Prey #96 (September 2006)
- Created by: Gail Simone; Paulo Siqueira

In-story information
- Alter ego: Charlotte Gage-Radcliffe
- Species: Metahuman
- Team affiliations: Birds of Prey; Teen Titans
- Notable aliases: Batgirl; Huntress; Charlie Gage-Radcliffe
- Abilities: Superhuman strength; Teleportation; Accelerated healing

Misfit (Charlotte Gage-Radcliffe) is a fictional character in the DC Comics Universe. She first appeared in Birds of Prey #96 (September 2006) as a wannabe Batgirl, taking on the name and wearing a homemade Batgirl costume; although Black Canary and Huntress dissuade her from continuing to use the moniker, she subsequently creates her own superhero identity as Misfit.

== Fictional character biography ==
=== The new Batgirl ===
Misfit as the new Batgirl, art by James Raiz.

Misfit debuts as a shadowy figure, wearing a homemade variation of Barbara Gordon's classic Batgirl costume, accurate enough to be mistaken for the original article at night. She seems to have some proficiency with martial arts and Batarangs, as she is able to save a couple from muggers. The male of the rescued couple says "Batgirl is back!".

This is enough for Barbara to send Black Canary and Huntress to find the new Batgirl. With Gypsy as a lure, acting as a damsel in distress, the girl then reveals herself, and after displaying her metahuman powers of teleportation, saves Huntress from being wounded. Displaying her extensive knowledge of the Birds of Prey's activities, she teleports right behind Barbara to speak with her. Oracle, impressed by the young girl's abilities, but deterred by her age, shows her photos of Stephanie Brown's autopsy to dissuade her from crime-fighting. The mystery girl agrees to retire her Batgirl identity, but not to abandon her heroic activities.

=== Misfit ===
In fact, she simply applies some minor cosmetic changes to her costume, like a stylized (bat-like) letter M instead of the batwings, and a denim miniskirt, and renames herself Misfit. Her proficiency with her powers in this period seems enhanced, as she is now able to teleport between Metropolis and Southern California and from Oracle's headquarters in Metropolis to an unspecified location in Russia. There she aids the Birds of Prey against the Secret Six.

Her identity ceased to be a mystery when the new Spy Smasher discloses her real name and last known address to Oracle. Misfit is revealed to be the only daughter of a single mother. She lived in a slum in Metropolis, until a fire broke out. Misfit is apparently able to teleport herself and anything non-organic, but not to bring anything living with her. She was able to teleport to safety, but had to leave her mother to die. Alone and scared, Misfit used her powers to spy on the Birds of Prey, secretly admiring the group of female crimefighters. The Birds agree to act as a surrogate, if dysfunctional, family for the girl.

Charlotte's recklessness and impulsiveness caused strain between her and her surrogate "mothers". While piloting a giant robot during a fight against a magically-empowered teen gangster, Misfit deliberately ignored Oracle's orders not to touch a certain button on the machine. After the button was pressed, an entire slum was leveled, leaving the gangster and many innocent people dead due to Misfit's actions. Oracle cracks under the pressure, her resolve already weakened by having lost Superman's trust in her abilities. She starts to train Misfit more harshly, blaming herself for having sent Misfit into the field without proper preparation. Misfit manages to prove her worth again, defeating an enraged Black Alice and saving Manhunter from a cadre of magic-using villains.

Reminiscing about her dead mother, Misfit teleports back home to Metropolis, where she is kidnapped by Darkseid's henchmen, fed with experimental drugs to shatter her will and forced to fight against other metahumans. Black Alice is captured too, and she considers stealing Misfit's teleportation ability to escape captivity. However, a discovery by Bernadeth that the two are related, prompts Black Alice to save her rival. Eventually, Misfit is freed from the drugs' effects, but is left psychologically scarred.

When Barbara Gordon transfers the Birds of Prey headquarters to Platinum Flats (a fictional city in the Silicon Valley) to tackle a group of white-collar criminals, she forces Charlotte to enroll at the local high school. There Charlotte seems to have a hard time fitting in, as her spunky personality does not blend with the sophisticated children of the "new economy" riches. Furthermore, she finds herself surpassed in popularity by her rival Lori, formerly a goth outcast, but now considered attractive by the geeky elite of Platinum Flats.

Misfit recently appeared in Teen Titans (vol. 3) #66, wanting to be a new member and asking that Oracle not be told of her plans. While Robin told her the doors were always open for her to visit, she was not made a member of the team, and was ultimately passed over in favor of Static, Aquagirl, and Kid Eternity. Following the apparent death of Bruce Wayne, the Birds of Prey break up and go their separate ways. Some time later during the events of Brightest Day, Oracle reunites in Gotham City with Huntress and Black Canary, mentioning in passing that Charlotte is now living with a foster family. She is later revealed to be one of only five heroes outside of the Birds of Prey who know that Oracle is alive.

Despite no longer being a member of the Birds of Prey, Charlotte appears as a member of Wonder Woman's all-female superteam in Wonder Woman #600. Misfit eventually appears at a meeting involving a close-knit group of Gotham heroes who have come to meet with Oracle after she fakes her death. She has a disagreement with Stephanie Brown, who succeeded Cassandra Cain as the new Batgirl and currently acts as Oracle's protégé.

=== New 52 ===
Misfit made a brief cameo in Batgirl (vol. 4) #34 as one of several female heroes assisting Barbara Gordon in her war against Knightfall.

== Powers and abilities ==
Misfit has the ability to teleport vast distances without error, and without needing to know the layout of her destination. Oracle refers to her as "the most powerful teleporter I've ever encountered". Misfit's power is limited to herself and non-living objects in her possession. After temporarily "borrowing" Misfit's powers, Black Alice teleports away with Granny Goodness, making her explode in the process.

Misfit also has some degree of accelerated healing; when she is shot in the stomach with a bullet intended for Huntress, she heals completely mere minutes later, and later she mentions "the way I don't stay wounded if I get hurt" to Oracle. Darkseid is able to discern that Misfit heals faster while teleporting, as she is able to rebuild her burnt off face in a few "jumps". She also appears to have some degree of enhanced strength, though this has not been confirmed. Her powers are apparently natural metahuman abilities that she was born with, as opposed to being the result of some outside influence after birth. These abilities are magical (Homo Magi) in nature, and this allows Black Alice to channel them.

During her tenure with the Birds of Prey, Misfit has received extensive martial arts training by Oracle. Despite lacking the skills and the experience of her teammates, Misfit has improved enough to be able to defend herself, and even to beat more experienced metahumans, like Livewire and four other unnamed metahuman girls.

== Other versions ==
The Teen Titans storyline "Titans of Tomorrow... Today!" reveals that as an adult in an alternate future timeline, Charlotte operates as the Huntress in the Titans Army, and has dyed her hair blonde and wears fishnet stockings, like Black Canary.
