= Super Sons of Tomorrow =

DC Comics limited series

Publication information
- Publisher: DC Comics
- Format: Limited series
- Genre: Superhero
- Publication date: December 2017 - January 2018
- No. of issues: 5 issues (one epilogue)
- Main character(s): Superman; Teen Titans; Titans Tomorrow; Tim Drake

Creative team
- Written by: Peter Tomasi
- Artist(s): Patrick Gleeson; Jorge Jimenez
- Editor(s): Brian Cunningham; Amedeo Turturro

"Super Sons of Tomorrow" is a crossover event from DC Comics between Superman, his son Jon Kent, and the Teen Titans. This story features Superman and his son dealing with a rogue Tim Drake from an alternate future. The entire crossover received mixed reviews with critics praising the story, art style, and action although the ending received some criticism for its lack of consequences.

== Synopsis ==
Tim Drake from an alternate timeline attacks Bruce Wayne while he is reading. Bruce defeats Tim, but Tim shoots Bruce when his guard is down and goes to the Batcave where he can get Batman's contingency weapons to deal with Superman. Meanwhile, in the Arctic, Superman is fixing the Fortress of Solitude when Tim Drake attacks him. Superman easily disarms Tim, but Tim provides a distraction in order to acquire the Kryptonian Battle Armor. Superman easily takes down Tim once more, but Tim traps Superman in a cage filled with red kryptonite and tells Superman he must kill Jon Kent.

Tim Drake eavesdrops on a phone call between Kathy Branden and Lois Lane, resists being pulled back by Hypertime, then knocks out Lois. The Teen Titans (Damian Wayne, Starfire, Aqualad, Kid Flash (Wallace West), Beast Boy, and Raven) take down a group of villains called the Hangmen but Damian is irritated when Jon takes down the leader without his supervision. While arguing, Tim hacks in the Titans Tower and tells Raven to spread his thoughts to the Teen Titans so they can see why he wants Superboy. Raven does what Tim asks, and it is shown that in the future Jon and Damian will get into an argument, causing Jon to explode and kill millions of civilians. Tim traps Jon in a goo, and Jon uses his solar flare to get the goo out of him but as a result there is a huge explosion, and Tim's Titans decides to get him.

Damian wakes up and finds Superboy and drives him somewhere safe, while Tim Drake regains consciousness and calls himself Savior. Jon Kent is worried that he will become evil, but Damian reassures him that he did not kill anyone. Meanwhile, the Titans of Tomorrow (Conner Kent, Bart Allen, and Cassandra Sandsmark) cannot find Tim because he hid himself again, and realize that Tim is going more insane due to the strain in the time stream. The Titans of Tomorrow decide to wait for the next phase interval to get him. Savior finds the Teen Titans regain consciousness and tries to convince them that he needs to kill Jon and anyone who stands in their way. Raven offers another solution which is to depower Superboy in order to contain and help him, to which Savior agrees. Just then, Savior is pulled in the time stream, and Raven agrees to help Savior but leaves the rest of the Teen Titans alone.

Aqualad finds Superboy since he gives off an energy signature and the rest of the Teen Titans manage to convince Damian and Jon Kent that they are not going to hurt them. The Titans of Tomorrow grab Tim Drake's severed hand and go through the time stream. The Teen Titans tell Damian that the only way Savior will not find them is if they knock Damian and Jon out since Raven is the one trying to find them. Jon knocks Damian out, and tells Kid Flash to knock him out. They all go to the Fortress of Solitude, where Jon finds his father in the kryptonite cage and frees him by using his solar flare. Raven, Beast Boy, and Savior arrive as well as the Titans of Tomorrow. Beast Boy and Raven try to contain the blast while Bart and Wallace run around in the opposite direction to reverse polarity. Superman and Conner Kent decide to go into the solar flare to save Jon, but Savior realizes that the containment is not working and decides to absorb the solar flare all by himself. This saves Jon, but pulls Savior back in the timestream; he vows to fight anyone who interferes in it.

Superman asks the Titans of Tomorrow who they are, but Conner Kent tells them that he cannot really tell or else the time stream will get damaged. Wallace and Bart decide to use the Speed Force to send the Titans of Tomorrow back to their respective time. Raven scolds Wallace West for taking a picture of the Titans of Tomorrow, and Bruce Wayne wakes up to see Alfred taking care of him. Superman questions if Damian Wayne is a good influence on his son but after Jon supports Damian, Superman agrees and takes the Teen Titans to the Watchtower. Batman arrives and the rest of the team holds a vote on whether Jon should be a Teen Titan with only Damian voting. Damian consoles Jon and admits he thinks of him as a friend which cheers Jon up.

=== Aftermath ===
The Team decides to disband since the Titans Tower was destroyed and Beast Boy, Starfire, Raven and Aqualad decide to leave. Beast Boy plays baseball, but is infected with a drug from a mysterious woman.

== Critical reception ==
According to Comic Book Roundup, Superman Vol. 4 #37 received an average rating of 7.6 out of 10 based on 22 reviews. Blair Marnell from IGN wrote: "This issue is over all too quickly, but it's hard to complain when the action is that satisfying. It's too soon to tell if the rest of the crossover will live up this opening chapter, but it's a great calling card for Jimenez's future work. He's got the makings of a superstar artist".

Super Sons #11 received an average rating of 7.4 out of 10 based on 21 reviews. Eric Shea from Weird Science wrote: "The fights continue in this second part to the "Super Sons of Tomorrow" arc, but thankfully so does the intrigue. I just really wish that this story would start throwing some answers our way instead of just making more questions. The art in this issue is really decent and I'm still really on board with this story, but right now a lot of aspects are leaving me scratching my head".

Teen Titans #15 received an average rating of 7 out of 10 based on 12 reviews. Jericho Wilson from Comic Watch wrote: "This issue of Teen Titans is your typical action-fueled comic book crossover. The characterization is shallow and untenable. The expository dialogue drones on for too many panels and drags the pace of the narrative to a crawl at times. But the artwork is pretty and the stakes are serious, albeit melodramatic. Not much going on here but your average, dopey, uninspired superhero slugfest. Harmless and brainless escapism".

Superman #38 received an average rating of 7 out of 10 based on 20 reviews. Brett from Graphic Policy wrote: "The ending is a little flat at times. There's a lot that just happens and there's not much reaction to it. We'll see if there's follow up to it but on its own, there's just something missing. The overall story is solid and hopefully a prologue addresses some of my concerns but what started out great ends with a meh".

Super Sons #12 received an average rating of 7.6 out of 10 based on 21 reviews. Brandon J Griffin from Monkeys Fighting Robots wrote: "Super Sons #12 is a nice, quiet wrap-up for the crossover story. It doesn't have the youthful glow and spirit that makes this book lovable and unique, but it's a solid effort".
