= Titans Tomorrow =

2005 DC comic book story arc

- Cover of Teen Titans: The Future is Now (2005), trade paperback collected edition, art by Mike McKone.
- Publisher: DC Comics
- Publication date: December 2004 – February 2005
- Genre: Superhero
- Main character: Teen Titans

Creative team
- Writer: Geoff Johns
- Artist: Mike McKone
- Teen Titans: The Future is Now: ISBN 1-4012-0475-9

"Titans Tomorrow" is a storyline of a possible alternate future in the DC Comics Universe, from Teen Titans vol. 3 #17–19 (2005), by Geoff Johns and Mike McKone. The story arc has been collected as part of the Teen Titans: The Future is Now trade paperback. The concept was revisited in the Teen Titans monthly title by writer Sean McKeever and artist Alé Garza in the "Titans of Tomorrow... Today!" storyline.

== Titans Tomorrow ==
While on their first date, Superboy (Conner Kent) and Wonder Girl are confronted by a wormhole that sends Superboy into the 31st century of the Legion of Super-Heroes. The trauma of time travel causes memory lapses for Superboy and he cannot recall the exact moment of his departure. He spends five months in the future, fighting the Fatal Five before Saturn Girl uses her powers to figure out when Superboy was from. Superboy re-emerges from the portal several seconds after he had left, wearing Superman's costume. He is followed by Persuader and with the help of Wonder Girl, they hold off the Persuader in time to recruit the rest of the Titans for a trip to the future. The Legion and Titans both end up in the time stream: the Legion is lost in time, due to the events of Infinite Crisis, and the Titans travel ten years into their future. The Titans emerge at Titans Tower in San Francisco. The Tower's security system allows access to past and present Titans through DNA screening; they are allowed access. The statue of the founding Titans has been replaced by one depicting the current team. The "Hall of Mentors" includes statues of Ares, Lex Luthor, and Superman standing back-to-back, and a shattered statue of Batman.

The Teen Titans' arrival does not go unnoticed by the present Titans and a fight ensues. Only the future Bart Allen remembers the trip through the time-portal and ends the hostilities. The future Titans are led by their Batman, an adult Tim Drake. After a discussion, the Titans agree to let the Teen Titans stay the night.

Tempted to learn of his future, Superboy seeks out his counterpart only to find the team has captured Deathstroke and is engaged in torturing him: Superman has burned his arm off. After Superboy tells the other Teen Titans what he saw, they decide to leave the Tower and regroup elsewhere. The adult Titans try to stop them, but are only able to capture Tim. Batman brings Tim to the Batcave and his cemetery. Almost all of Batman's rogues and Bruce Wayne, Selina Kyle, and Alfred Pennyworth are all buried there. The future Batman has killed most of his enemies using the pistol that Joe Chill used to kill Bruce Wayne's parents. As Tim tells his counterpart to stay back as he comments that he wouldn't go this low if Bruce died. Batman states that a lot of people died during the "Crisis" caused when Duela Dent went on a rampage which claimed Bruce and Alfred. Afterwards, the adult Tim became the new Batman and murdered every one of Bruce's enemies. Unable to convince Tim that he is still a good guy, he decides to mindwipe the Titans, starting with Tim, and send them back in time. The rest of the Teen Titans head to Keystone City, which has been transformed into a large Flash Museum. They seek the Cosmic Treadmill, intending for Bart to use the machine to send them home. The device is missing. The team meet the heroic Titans East.

Tim continues his fight with his adult counterpart who is using the same gun that Joe Chill used to murder Thomas Wayne and Martha Wayne. The rest of the Titans show up to rescue him. The team decides that it might be best to disband the Titans upon their return to the present, but Cyborg 2.0 reveals that it was the team's disbanding and the superheroes in question dying in the "Crisis" that led to this dystopian future timeline. Cyborg 2.0 reveals that Titans West turned the Western United States into a police state due to Dark Raven's influence. He formed Titans East as a resistance force against them, an act which split the United States into two countries. The adult Flash is a double agent, secretly working with Titans East. He reveals that the treadmill has been moved to the Batcave, where the future Batman has also taken Robin. The Teen Titans and Titans East join forces to battle the Titans West. The fight is a stalemate, but the Teen Titans access the treadmill and escape to the past. Conner's future self visits Lex Luthor, his genetic donor, who he considers to be his father.

== Titans of Tomorrow... Today! ==
The Titans of Tomorrow, cover of Teen Titans #51 (2007).

A year after the events of Infinite Crisis, the Titans of Tomorrow, which is now composed of Superman (Conner Kent), Batman (Tim Drake), Wonder Woman (Cassie Sandsmark), Flash (Bart Allen), Red Devil (Eddie Bloomberg), and Martian Manhunter (M'gann M'orzz), travel from nine years in the future to the present day, with the intent of preserving their future. They take down the Justice League to ensure that their younger selves confront Starro and his band of brainwashed supervillains unassisted.

The future versions of Bart and Conner, clones created by Drake, are less ethical than their younger selves once were. The future Batman tells Robin "to start making a real difference" at the end of issue 51; Robin informs him that "he will start making a real difference" and puts Batman's gun to his head.

Batman argues that if Robin pulls the trigger, "he'll be condemning more lives" than he's supposed to save in the future, with no chance of Conner and Bart coming back. Batman also advises Robin to reject his feelings for Wonder Girl, because she's still in love with Superboy. Batman urges Robin to do what is right for the sake of the future. Thinking he may have gotten through to Robin, Batman leaves. Robin then contemplates killing Prometheus with Batman's handgun. Blue Beetle battles the Flash, and after a difficult struggle, manages to defeat the speedster and rescue the Justice League. The League maintains their trust in the Teen Titans, and have faith that the Titans would never let that grim future come to pass. After the Justice League returns to the Watchtower headquarters, Red Devil arrives and reveals that he had killed Blue Beetle in the future. When he tries to kill him in the present, he is stopped by Ravager and Kid Devil. Lex Luthor arrives with the rest of the future Titans, which includes adult versions of Cyborg, Animal Man, Aquawoman, Dark Raven, Bumblebee, Flamebird, Hawk, Vulcan, Red Arrow, Zachary Zatara, Shining Knight, Terra, Starwoman, Prysm, Batwoman, Black Ray, Toyman, Hardrock, Huntress, and Pandemic. Luthor informs the Titans that their actions have changed the future for the worse. The teams are attacked by Starro, forcing them to work together.

Miss Martian battles her older self, and learns that the future Titan's immunity to fire is generated by a force field. Through a telepathic link, Miss Martian's future counterpart reveals the rationale behind the Sinestro Corps and their war to subjugate the universe. The horror of this mental vision causes Miss Martian to lash out, and she beheads her future self. Miss Martian finds Robin and takes him to a location that she says will remind him that what happens in the future is up to them and not the future team. Blue Beetle discovers that he is the only non-Starro-controlled hero left standing after the main battle. Supergirl witnesses the Sinestro Corps preparing to attack Earth. Blue Beetle frees Bart, who eventually retrieves one of Captain Cold's guns from the Flash Museum, with which he destroys Starro, freeing the Titans. Wonder Woman tells Cassie that she is friends with Supergirl because she is mourning Conner, and that Supergirl will become bitter and jealous when he returns. Cassie is momentarily crushed when she realizes that the clone of Conner retains no memories of her time with him. Robin again confronts Batman, but they are interrupted when Cassie arrives and informs Robin that the two clones remember nothing of their past. She kisses Robin, which alters Batman's memories.

An enraged Conner arrives, stopped only by a kryptonite bullet fired from Batman's gun. As a result, all of the figures from the future fade away; the present-day Titans leave to take part in the battle against the Sinestro Corps. Eight years later, Tim Drake and Cassie Sandsmark are in a relationship. Tim however is having an affair with Miss Martian, and the two collaborate with Lex Luthor in cloning several of the fallen Titans, including Conner and Bart.

== A Lonely Place of Living ==
During DC Rebirth, the future Tim Drake is revealed to be one of Mr. Oz's prisoners. It is shown that at some point in the future, Tim broke away from the rest of the future Titans, leaving them to fight Cyborg's team alone. After meeting his teen counterpart he helps him in re-imprisoning Doomsday, who had been accidentally released. They escape back to Gotham City, where the future Tim learns that the timeline has been altered as a result of the events of Flashpoint. Realizing that he can prevent his dystopian future from ever coming to pass, the future Tim paralyzes his past counterpart and sets out to kill Kate Kane, who he blames for the fall of the Bat Family. He is however unsuccessful and is sent back to his own timeline.

=== Super Sons of Tomorrow ===
Set in the Super Sons of Tomorrow future, an older Tim Drake returns to Gotham and plots to kill Jon Kent, Superman's son, in an attempt to prevent the consequences of Jon's actions in the future. Other members from the Titans of Tomorrow followed Drake to the past in an attempt to get to the bottom of his actions. These included their own versions of Superman, Flash, and Wonder Woman. After helping contain Jon's solar flare, Tim is trapped in Hypertime as a consequence.

== Characters ==
=== Titans Tomorrow members ===
- Animal Man — Gar Logan refused to join Cyborg on Titans East because Terra was a member. His powers have increased to the point he can now turn into mythical animals and multiple animals at once. The future Animal Man hints that the present day Beast Boy also has this ability, but is ashamed or unwilling to use it. He later travels back to the present day with Luthor and several other Titans.
- Aquawoman — Lorena Marquez, the current Aquagirl. Not much is known about Aquawoman except that she possesses telepathic abilities. She also took down Garth at some point. She has been erased from the team's lineup history since Infinite Crisis. She later travels back to the present day with Luthor and several other Titans.
- Batman — Tim Drake has taken over the mantle of the Bat following the death of Bruce Wayne at the hands of Brother Eye. He's more ruthless than his predecessor and exhibits many of the morals and ethics of Jason Todd. He carries around the gun that Joe Chill used to kill Thomas and Martha Wayne and uses it to execute criminals, including most of Batman's rogues gallery. While not explicitly stated, he appears to be the leader of the Titans. Batman inherited Wayne Manor (renamed Drake Manor) and the kryptonite ring from Bruce. Tim is a wanted criminal who is hunted by GCPD police commissioner Renee Montoya and his mentor's former ally/friend James Gordon.
- Dark Raven — Raven has accepted her role as demoness and daughter of Trigon. She used her powers to absorb all emotion from the Western United States which is under the Titans' control. She has been erased from the team's lineup history since Infinite Crisis. Dark Raven later travels back to the present day with Luthor and several other Titans.
- Flash — The mantle of the Flash has been handed down, yet again, this time to Bart Allen. He is seemingly the only Titan without compromised morals, which is why he also works for Titans East. Unlike his teammates, the Flash is the only one who remembers his time travels with them and meeting their dystopian future selves, and seeks to change the past by preventing the Titans West erasing their young counterparts' memories as happened in his timeline. He is involved with Rose Wilson and is a double agent for Titans East. According to the Flash Museum which has enveloped Keystone City, one of his allies is Donna Troy, who was still deceased at the time.
  - Flash Clone - The second alternate version of Flash is a clone created by Tim after Bart died battling Inertia and the Rogues.
- Martian Manhunter — Having fully embraced her White Martian heritage, M'gann M'orzz now operates with the future Titans as the new Martian Manhunter.
- Red Devil — Eddie Bloomberg has aged and is now a servant of Neron as per the deal he made many years prior that gave him his powers. Red Devil killed Blue Beetle sometime in the future.
- Superman — Conner Kent has grown up and replaced Superman who died during the "Crisis". His tactile telekinesis has increased to the point where he is able to create shields in addition to his fully developed Kryptonian powers. He has set up the Fortress of Paradise near Smallville and now sees Lex Luthor, his genetic donor, as a father figure. At some point, he and Captain Marvel Jr. fought for the affection of Cassie Sandsmark, who chose Conner.
  - Clone of Superman - The second alternate version is a clone created by Tim after Conner died battling Superboy-Prime during Infinite Crisis.
- Wonder Woman — Cassie Sandsmark has become Ares' champion and the new Wonder Woman. She has replaced Diana, who was killed during the "Crisis".

=== Titans East members ===
- Batwoman (Bette Kane) — The former lover of Tim Drake. She later travels back to the present day with Luthor and several other Titans.
- Bumblebee (Karen Beecher-Duncan) — The co-leader of Titans East. She later travels back to the present day with Luthor and several other Titans.
- Captain Marvel (Freddy Freeman) — The former Captain Marvel Jr. and successor to the power of Shazam.
- Cyborg 2.0 (Victor Stone) — An upgraded Cyborg. Co-leader of Titans East along with Bumblebee. He later travels back to the present day with Luthor and several other Titans.
- Flash (Bart Allen) - See above.
- Ravager (Rose Wilson) — The daughter of Deathstroke.
- Terra (Tara Markov) — A geo-elemental.

=== Titans Army members ===
The following make up the Titans Army commanded by the Titans Tomorrow during the "Titans of Tomorrow...Today!" arc:

- Animal Man (Garfield Logan)
- Aquawoman (Lorena Marquez)
- Batwoman (Cassandra Cain)
- Black Ray (Ray Terrill)
- Bumblebee (Karen Beecher-Duncan)
- Cyborg 2.0 (Victor Stone)
- Dark Raven (Rachel Roth)
- Flamebird (Bette Kane)
- Hardrock (Ross Richman)
- Hawk (Holly Granger)
- Huntress (Charlotte Gage-Radcliffe)
- Lex Luthor
- Pandemic (Shyleen Lao)
- Prysm (Audrey Spears)
- Red Arrow (Mia Dearden)
- Shining Knight (Ystina)
- Starwoman (Courtney Whitmore)
- Vulcan (Miguel Devante)
- Terra (Atlee)
- Toyman (Hiro Okamura)
- Zachary Zatara

=== Other characters ===
- Brother Blood — He and Brainiac were imprisoned in the Phantom Zone by Superman.
- Deathstroke — He allied with Titan's East and Cyborg 2.0's resistance.
- Donna Troy — She was listed an ally of Bart in the Flash Museum.
- Duela Dent — Duela was killed by Tim-Batman.
- Mad Mod — Mad Mod was killed in battle with the Titans.
- Mal Duncan — Duncan is mentioned to have become President of the United States.
- Mento — Mento has merged with cyberspace.
- Mister Twister — Titans East halted a hurricane that Mister Twister created.
- Phantom Limbs — The cybernetic soldiers in Cyborg 2.0's war against superheroes.
- Ron Evers — He fought in Cyborg 2.0's war against superheroes.
- Roy Harper — Roy was this reality's Green Arrow and died in battle.
