= Kathy Kane =

Character appearing in DC Comics

Batwoman
- Batwoman (Kathy Kane). Art by Dick Giordano.

Publication information
- Publisher: DC Comics
- First appearance: As Batwoman: Detective Comics #233 (July 1956); As Agent Zero: Grayson #12 (September, 2015)
- Created by: Edmond Hamilton; Sheldon Moldoff

In-story information
- Alter ego: Katherine "Kathy" Webb-Kane (originally); Kathrine "Luka" Netz (current continuity)
- Species: Human
- Team affiliations: Batman Family; Spyral
- Partnerships: Batman; Bat-Girl
- Notable aliases: Kathrine Kane: Cat-Woman; Headmistress; Katherine Webb
- Abilities: Highly skilled martial artist; Highly skilled detective; Utilizes high-tech equipment and weapons; Mastery of stealth and tactics

Katherine "Kathy" Kane is a character appearing in American comic books published by DC Comics. She is the first DC character to appear as the superheroine Batwoman. She was created by writer Edmond Hamilton and artist Sheldon Moldoff under the direction of editor Jack Schiff, as part of an ongoing effort to expand Batman's cast of supporting characters. Batwoman began appearing in DC Comics stories beginning with Detective Comics #233 (1956), in which she was introduced as a love interest for Batman in order to combat the allegations of Batman's homosexuality arising from the controversial book Seduction of the Innocent (1954). When Julius Schwartz became editor of the Batman-related comic in 1964, he removed characters deemed non-essential, including Batwoman, Bat-Girl, Bat-Mite, and Ace the Bat-Hound. Later, the 1985 limited series Crisis on Infinite Earths retroactively established that Kathy Kane never becomes Batwoman in DC's main continuity. The character has since made appearances in the main continuity without the Batwoman persona.

== Publication history ==
Detective Comics #233 (July 1956), Batwoman's first appearance.

Kathy Kane is primarily associated with the Silver Age of Comic Books. In the aftermath of the attacks on comics in the early 1950s, the Batwoman was the first of several characters that would make up the 'Batman Family'. Since the family formula had proven very successful for the Superman franchise, editor Jack Schiff suggested to Batman co-creator, Bob Kane, that he create one for the Batman. A female was chosen first, to offset the charges made by Fredric Wertham that Batman and the original Robin, Dick Grayson, were homosexual. Kathy Kane and alter ego Batwoman first appeared in Detective Comics #233 (July 1956). In the character's debut issue, Batwoman is introduced as a female rival to the crimefighting prowess of Batman:

There's only one Batman! That's been said many times and has always been true, for no other man has ever rivaled Batman as a champion of the law, nor matched his superb acrobatic skill, his scientific keenness, his mastery of disguise and detective skill! But now, in one suspenseful surprise after another, Batman finds he has a great rival in the mysterious and glamorous girl...The Batwoman!

She was a costumed crime-fighter like Batman, yet in many ways not an exact counterpart. For example, the contents of her utility purse were actually weapons disguised as stereotypical feminine accoutrements such as lipstick, cosmetic compacts, charm bracelets, and hair nets. Batwoman appeared regularly in the pages of Batman and Detective Comics through the early 1960s. Although letters from fans indicated Batwoman had become popular with readers, editor Julius Schwartz considered the heroine, as well as other Batman-related characters, to be inappropriate for the new direction he planned to take the Batman universe. Following the revamp to Detective Comics in 1964, Batwoman was removed from the series. In 1967, a 'new' Batgirl, Barbara Gordon, was introduced, who not only replaced Batwoman as Batman's female counterpart, she surpassed the original heroine in popularity. Batgirl also proved to be more appropriate for her time period and the realistic approach DC Comics began taking with its characters. Unlike Batwoman, Gordon's Batgirl used a utility belt and various gadgets similar to Batman's, in addition to being a skilled martial artist and possessing a doctorate in her civilian identity. Despite requests from readers to revive Batwoman, DC's editorial staff initially declined to bring the character out of retirement, considering the fact that she was specifically created to be a love interest for Batman.

...Batwoman and Bat-Girl were there because romance seemed to be needed in Batman [and Robin]'s life. But thanks to the big change and a foresighted editor, these hapless females are gone for good. In their place stands a girl who is a capable crime-fighter, a far cry from Batwoman who constantly had to be rescued by [sic] Batman.

However, with the launch of the Batman Family comic book series in 1975, readers continued to request for Batwoman to appear in new stories. One reader states:

it is totally beyond me why you ignored Batwoman in your first two issues... I can understand your reluctance to go back to the days where everybody in Gotham had a Bat-identity, but you can't wipe out Batwoman that easily...I was counting on her making the scene in a new story, perhaps coming out of retirement to offer assistance to your Dynamite Duo [Batgirl and Robin].

Batwoman was brought back in Batman Family #10 (March–April 1977) as "Batgirl's guest heroine" when she comes out of retirement to capably assist Batgirl in defeating Killer Moth and the Cavalier; the two women even learn each other's secret identities during the story. Batwoman appeared two more times in the title, in issues #14 (1977) and #17 (1978). Batwoman then next appeared with Batgirl in two issues of Freedom Fighters #14 and #15 in 1978. However, in Detective Comics #485 (August–September 1979), Batwoman is killed by the League of Assassins (assisted by the Bronze Tiger). Editor Dennis O'Neil later stated in an interview, "we already had Batgirl, we didn't need Batwoman." The issue marked the final appearance of the Earth-1 Kathy Kane. An Earth-2 version appeared in The Brave and The Bold #182 (January 1982). This Kathy Kane retired from crime-fighting when that world's Batman married Catwoman; this world's Kathy was now married and with a family of her own. She comes out of retirement to help a grown-up Robin and the Earth-1 Batman battle the Earth-2 Hugo Strange.

The Kathy Kane version of Batwoman was restored to modern continuity by writer Grant Morrison in flashback sequences in various issues of their run on the Batman-related titles, most explicitly in Batman Incorporated #4 (August 2011). This issue reveals the origin of the original Batwoman in current DC Universe continuity; she is Bruce's aunt by marriage. After she was widowed, she and Bruce fought side by side and were lovers for a time, until it appeared she was killed. In that time, she worked reluctantly as a member of the spy organisation Spyral, which had employed her to uncover Batman's identity. Her biological father was also revealed to be the Nazi scientist Otto Netz (Doctor Dedalus). In 2013, in Morrison's final Batman Incorporated issue, it is revealed that Kathy is alive and working as an assassin for Spyral. Kathy then makes a few fleeting appearances in Grayson (2014–2016), referred to primarily as Agent Zero. In Grayson #8, during a fraught encounter between Dick Grayson and acting Spyral head Mr. Minos, Kathy shows up to assassinate him.

== Fictional character biography ==
=== Pre-Crisis ===
In the original Pre-Crisis continuity, Kathy Kane, a wealthy Gotham City heiress and former circus performer, decides to use her skills and resources to become a costumed crime-fighter. This is partly out of altruism and partly to attract the romantic attentions of Batman. During the Silver Age of Comics, Batwoman guest-starred occasionally in Batman stories published from 1956 to 1964. While Batman wished for Kane to retire from crimefighting due to the danger, she remained his ally, even when she temporarily became a new version of Catwoman. In 1961, Batwoman was joined by her niece Betty Kane, alias Bat-Girl. Kathy and Betty were romantically interested in Batman and Robin, respectively. Robin seemed to return Bat-Girl's affection, while Batman remained aloof. In 1964 however, DC dropped Batwoman, as well as Bat-Girl, Ace the Bat-Hound, and Bat-Mite from the Batman titles, which were undergoing a revamp under editor Julius Schwartz that eliminated many of the sci-fi elements that were introduced in the 1950s. However, Batwoman continued to make appearances in stories published during the next few years in the Batman-Superman team-up book World's Finest in various "imaginary stories" where she was married to Batman and had started a family with him. The character would later reappear in the late 1970s, made guest appearances in the Batman Family and Freedom Fighters comic book series, often fighting crime alongside Barbara Gordon, who had become the new Batgirl. In a story depicting Batwoman as a retired crimefighter, she becomes the owner of a circus, which she keeps until killed by the League of Assassins and the brainwashed Bronze Tiger.

During this period, DC began heavily using the Multiverse storytelling device which posited that the publisher's earliest stories (from the Golden Age of Comic Books) took place on the parallel world of Earth-Two. DC visited the concept of an older Batwoman in The Brave and the Bold #182 (January 1982), in a story titled "Interlude on Earth-2". In this story, which features the Pre-Crisis Earth-One Batman accidentally arriving on Earth-Two to battle the Earth-Two Hugo Strange alongside the adult Earth-Two Dick Grayson (Robin), Batwoman is portrayed as middle-aged and still in love with the now-deceased Commissioner Bruce Wayne of Earth-Two.

=== Post-Crisis ===
Later, the conclusion of the publisher's 1985 maxiseries Crisis on Infinite Earths altered DC Universe continuity, subsequently changing the character histories of Batwoman and Bat-Girl. In the new continuity, Kathy Kane did exist, though her persona as Batwoman had been erased. Bat-Girl never existed either, but a superheroine named Flamebird was introduced, who had a somewhat similar costume and name, "Bette Kane".

Despite the erasure of both Kathy Kane as Batwoman and Betty Kane as Bat-Girl, there were references to both heroines in Post-Crisis publications. In Alan Moore's Batman: The Killing Joke, Batman stares at a photograph that portrays Bat-Girl, Batwoman, Ace the Bat-Hound, and Bat-Mite—characters that did not exist in DC continuity at the time. In Planet Krypton #1, which was part of The Kingdom storyline, a Hypertime ghost of Batwoman haunts the Planet Krypton restaurant. Batman briefly recognizes her as "Kathy", but then quickly denies knowing her. Kathy, sans her Batwoman identity, was also referenced in a few Post-Crisis publications. According to The DC Comics Encyclopedia: The Definitive Guide to The Characters of the DC Universe (2004), Kathy was described as a wealthy former circus stuntwoman that had inherited her father's fortune and later became acquainted with Bruce Wayne as a Gotham socialite. She eventually became a crimefighting ally to Batman, although she never used the Batwoman name. The encyclopedia entry explains that she eventually purchased a circus and was murdered by a member of the League of Assassins; however, the Bronze Tiger was not her killer. Her murder was again recalled in Suicide Squad #38. During the Beast Boy miniseries, Flamebird tried to post bail for Beast Boy with money "borrowed from Aunt Kathy." Flamebird further mentioned that "Aunty Kathy's in Gotham" in Teen Titans #39.

The introduction of Kate Kane as the new Batwoman following the continuity-altering events of Infinite Crisis in 2005 allowed the company to revisit elements of the Kathy Kane character it did away with following Crisis on Infinite Earths; Batman writer Grant Morrison explicitly set out to treat Batman's entire publication history as his backstory. In Detective Comics #824 (2006), the Penguin refers to Kate Kane as the new Batwoman, implying for the first time since 1985 that there was an earlier Batwoman. Later Kathy appears in a flashback story in Batman #682 (2009), in a panel showing Batman and the original Batwoman kissing, with Robin showing his distrust of her and Bat-Girl. In this story, Kathy is referred to as "Katy" Kane. In Batman #686, Batman's butler Alfred mentions that Bruce Wayne was once romantically involved with Kathy.

Grant Morrison later chose to heavily reimagine Kathy Kane in 2011 for their Batman Incorporated series. It is established that Kathy Kane was born Katherine Webb, and that she had been an aspiring independent film director prior to marrying a millionaire named Nathan Kane, the son of Roderick and Elizabeth Kane and brother of Martha (Kane) Wayne, Bruce Wayne's mother. Nathan and Kathy were madly in love with one another, and it was Nathan who ended up buying Kathy her circus as a birthday present. After Nathan's untimely death, Kathy was approached by a young man known only as Agent-33, who recruited her into a covert spy organization called Spyral. As part of her first assignment, Kathy was tasked with tracking down Batman and discovering his true identity. Donning a female variation of Batman's costume in order to gain his attention, she embarked on a career as a costumed crime-fighter while attempting to get close to Batman. Her plan succeeded but the two fell in love with one another, despite Kathy legally being Wayne's aunt. As a result, she refused to reveal his identity to her superiors at Spyral. Later, Kathy was confronted by the head of Spyral, a Nazi supervillain named Dr. Dedalus (Otto Netz) who claimed to be her real father and threatened to expose her to Batman unless she continued her mission. Heartbroken, she broke off her relationship with Bruce in order to save him from Dedalus' plan. In the present, Batman and the South American vigilante El Gaucho are told by the villainess Scorpiana that El Gaucho was responsible for Kathy's murder, as he had originally been Agent-33 prior to becoming a superhero. Batman tells Gaucho that Scorpiana must be lying since Kathy had been killed by the League of Assassins, but Gaucho claims that there is some truth in her accusations, and that Batman would not understand. In the follow-up one-shot Batman Incorporated: Leviathan Strikes, students of an assassin training facility masquerading as St. Hadrian's Finishing School For Girls in England are shown wearing variations of Kathy's Batwoman costume, with the original masks replaced by skulls. Later, these women are shown to be agents of Spyral, dedicated to hunting down Talia al Ghul, whose organisation Leviathan is waging war with Batman. Kathy reappears alive in the concluding issue of Batman Incorporated, in which she shoots Talia al Ghul dead in the Batcave. Identifying herself as St. Hadrian's headmistress and requesting Batman not to go looking for her, she thanks Batman for leading Talia into her trap and reports to Spyral headquarters that one more international criminal has been killed.

Later, with the world thinking he is dead following Forever Evil, Dick Grayson goes to work for Spyral, he works under the direction of the scheming Mr. Minos, who during a tense confrontation with Dick is assassinated by Kane, who is identified only as the current Agent Zero; she is the real head of Spyral. When Dick tries to leave the organisation behind, he knows he cannot because of the "hypnos" implanted in his brain which allow him to hypnotise others and disguise his appearance, but also permit Spyral to monitor him always. Kathy, her face disguised by hypnos, pursues Dick to Gotham and tells him to take the day to say goodbye to his friends but that he cannot leave Spyral. He travels to Gotham City and reveals he is alive to Robin, Red Robin, Red Hood and Batgirl, and communicates with them by secret code. Acting on Dick's orders, they hack the Spyral hypnos so that on their next encounter, Dick can see Agent Zero's true face. Dick's hypnos reveal Agent Zero's identity, but not the name Kathy; it surrenders up the alternative name Luka Netz, Kathy's birth name. It is later revealed that her full name is Katrina "Luka" Netz and that she has an antagonistic relationship with her sister, Frau Elisabeth Netz.

== Other versions ==
Kathy Kane appears in Batman '66 #2.

== In other media ==
=== Television ===
A loose adaptation of Kathy Kane / Batwoman, named Katrina Moldoff / The Bat Lady appears in the Batman: The Brave and the Bold episode "The Criss Cross Conspiracy!", voiced by Vanessa Marshall. This version is the thrill-seeking heiress to the Moldoff Circus fortune and a trained circus acrobat whose crime-fighting style endangers bystanders. After being publicly unmasked and humiliated by the Riddler years prior, she is forced to give up her crime-fighting lifestyle before seeking revenge in the present by encouraging Felix Faust to give her a spell to switch her and Batman's bodies, allowing her to get closer to the Riddler without the police coming after her. After she fails, Batman rescues her and convinces Faust to switch them back before she quietly turns herself in to the police. Series director Ben Jones confirmed that the decision to rename the character was brought about after DC Comics voiced concerns about this depiction of the character having a negative impact on the new Batwoman comic book series, the first issue of which launched less than a month after the episode's initial air date.

=== Film ===
In the DC Animated Universe film Batman: Mystery of the Batwoman, a character named Kathleen "Kathy" Duquesne (dew-KAYN), voiced by Kimberly Brooks, holds a grudge against the Penguin and Rupert Thorne as well as her father Carlton Duquesne, a gangster in the crime bosses' employ. Kathy seeks revenge while taking turns operating as Batwoman with two other women to draw suspicion away from each other, with all three using lethal force to achieve their goals. As Batwoman, she is voiced by Kyra Sedgwick.
