= Titans East =

DC Comics superhero teams

Publication information
- Publisher: DC Comics
- First appearance: Teen Titans (vol. 3) #18 (January 2005)
- Created by: Geoff Johns

In-story information
- Base(s): New York City
- Member(s): List of Titans East members

Titans East is the name of several DC Comics superhero teams. The teams appear in the Teen Titans comic books and animated series. The comic book incarnation of Titans East first appeared in Teen Titans (vol. 3) #18 (2005) during the "Titans Tomorrow" storyline, which is set in the future. A present-day incarnation appeared in Teen Titans (vol. 3) #43 (2007), as a group of villains led by Deathstroke. Cyborg later assembled a new version of the team.

== Team history ==
Titans East is based on the Teen Titans' west-coast counterpart Titans West, a team of lesser-known teenage heroes including Beast Boy, Flamebird, and Hawk and Dove. Currently, the "main" Titans team is based in San Francisco, California, on the West Coast.

=== Titans Tomorrow ===
Batwoman, Bumblebee, Captain Marvel, Cyborg 2.0, Ravager, and Terra from the future Titans East.

The original Titans East first appeared in the "Titans Tomorrow" storyline in which the Teen Titans meet their villainous older selves in the future. This incarnation of Titans East is a group of former Titans rebelling against the future Titans' rule over the Western United States:

- Batwoman (Bette Kane): Formerly Flamebird and ex-lover of Tim Drake.
- Bumblebee (Karen Beecher-Duncan): Co-leader of Titans East.
- Captain Marvel (Freddy Freeman): Formerly Captain Marvel Jr. and successor to the power of the wizard Shazam.
- Cyborg (Victor Stone): Co-leader of Titans East along with Bumblebee.
- The Flash (Bart Allen): Works with Titans West as an agent for Titans East.
- Ravager (Rose Wilson): Daughter of Deathstroke.
- Terra (Tara Markov): Geo-elemental

=== Deathstroke's Titans ===
Deathstroke's Titans

Deathstroke created a group that he called "Titans East" specifically to take down the Teen Titans.

At the conclusion of the arc, Deathstroke mused to himself that he only created Titans East to drive his children, current Teen Titan members Ravager and Jericho, into staying with the Teen Titans. Deathstroke believed that since he could not be a proper father to them, he would manipulate them into fully accepting the Titans as their family, thus fulfilling his twisted sense of being a good father in the end. This version of Titans East disbanded after the storyline ended:

- Batgirl (Cassandra Cain): The new leader of the League of Assassins, and more importantly, the only fighter to completely dominate Ravager. Deathstroke believes that Batgirl's skills and past with Robin and the other Gotham Knights will give them an edge against the Boy Wonder. It has been revealed that Deathstroke is using the same serum he used on Rose on Cassandra. Given an antiserum, she allies with Robin and the Titans before disappearing.
- Bombshell: Sent by Deathstroke to spy on the Titans and get a disc containing the soul of his son, Jericho. After the Titans discovered she was a traitor and put her in prison, Cyborg and Miss Martian went to interrogate her. When Bombshell refused to say anything, Miss Martian tried reading her mind and discovered she was a member of Titans East. Before she could learn anything else, Risk broke in and Batgirl slit her throat.
- Duela Dent (also known as the Joker's Daughter): Completely insane, but also a former Titan. Deathstroke believes dealing with her insanity is worth the information Duela has. She had joined Robin's Titans team when Raven offered her membership in exchange for aid against the Titans East.
- Enigma: A late add-on to the team and was not mentioned until the solicit for Teen Titans vol. 3, #43, was released. Originally referred to as Riddler's Daughter, future solicits for Teen Titans refer to her as Enigma.
- Inertia: A clone of former Titan Bart Allen. Inertia was once a natural speedster, but lost his ability when the Speed Force was isolated in Bart, and now relies on a speed-inducing chemical created by Deathstroke.
- Kid Crusader: A "demon hunter" and the only person Deathstroke could find who has both heard of Kid Devil and wants to eliminate him. Originally, the character was named "Choir Boy", as stated by Dan DiDio in DC Nation, while a solicitation for Teen Titans #43 referred to the character by the name of "Alter Boy".
- Match: A clone of Superboy who has decayed to resemble Bizarro. While his Superman-level strength is a bonus for the team, Deathstroke thinks Match also gives the team a psychological advantage. Deathstroke is counting on his appearance to throw off Wonder Girl, the Titans' most physically powerful member, off balance, as she was Superboy's girlfriend. Match's outfit is altered to resemble Superboy's last costume before his death in Infinite Crisis, with a reverse Superman logo.
- Risk: A member of the Teen Titans who lost an arm fighting with the Titans against Superman-Prime and is "furious at the world" over it. Deathstroke believes he can manipulate Risk and thinks the Titans will hesitate in battle out of guilt.
- Sun Girl (Deborah Morgna): She can harnesses the power of the sun. She is also a master manipulator, much like the original Terra. Sun Girl later joins Superboy-Prime's Legion of Doom.

=== Titans East Special ===
Promotional image of the Titans East Special.

In November 2007, DC released a one-shot special called Titans East Special, written by Judd Winick with art by Ian Churchill and Norm Rapmund. In the special, Cyborg assembles a group of young heroes to train as the new "Titans East". These members include:

- Anima
- Hawk and Dove
- Lagoon Boy
- Little Barda
- Power Boy - a native of Apokolips.
- Son of Vulcan

During an early training mission, the Titans are attacked by an unknown assailant. Power Boy is killed, Anima, Son of Vulcan, and Lagoon Boy are rendered comatose, and Little Barda is left in critical condition. After recovering from the attack, Cyborg disbands Titans East to join the new Titans group upon discovering that Trigon's children may be responsible for the events.

== In other media ==
Titans East appears in Teen Titans, led by Bumblebee and consisting of Aqualad, Speedy, and Más y Menos. This version of the group serves as a sister group to the original Teen Titans, are based in their own version of Titans Tower, and was formed by Cyborg to investigate Brother Blood's activities in Steel City.
