= Enigma (DC Comics) =

Enigma is a name used by two supervillains published by American comic books published by DC Comics. The character first appeared in Teen Titans (vol. 3) #38 and was created by Geoff Johns and Tony Daniel. A villain in Trinity also utilizes the name Enigma. He is later revealed to be an alternate universe version of the Riddler.

An original Enigma named Evelyn Rhyme appears in the second season of Batwoman, portrayed by Laura Mennell.

== Fictional character biography ==
=== First Enigma ===
Enigma

Publication information
- Publisher: DC Comics
- First appearance: Teen Titans (vol. 3) #38 (September 2006)
- Created by: Geoff Johns (writer); Tony Daniel (artist); Carlos Ferreira (penciler); Art Thibert (inker)

In-story information
- Species: Human
- Team affiliations: Titans East; Teen Titans
- Notable aliases: The Riddler's Daughter

Enigma briefly joined the Teen Titans after the events of Infinite Crisis, but eventually left. During this period, she was known as the Riddler's Daughter, claiming to be the daughter of the Riddler. Enigma wields a question mark-shaped cane as a weapon.

One Year Later, she is a member of Deathstroke's villainous Titans East, now known as Enigma. During a battle, she says to Duela Dent "Wait'll dear old daddy gets a load of us!", implying that they may be sisters, or at least in Duela's mind they are. Enigma and Duela later psychologically torture Raven inside a hall of mirrors and reveal that Enigma joined Titans East as a way of getting her father, the Riddler, to accept her.

She later appears alongside Riddler while fighting Batman. At the story's conclusion, the Riddler betrays and apparently kills Enigma. Significantly later, she is revealed to have survived the attempt on her life. Enigma is inducted into what is ostensibly a rehabilitation program known as Arkham Academy, but in truth is a front designed by the Court of Owls to train new supervillains.

=== Anti-Matter Universe version ===
In issue #1 of the Trinity miniseries, a mysterious man whose face is half-obscured by a metal mask joins forces with Morgaine Le Fey. His true name is unknown, but he takes the moniker "Enigma", which Morgaine had initially called him. Along with Morgaine, he plans to conquer the universe by forcibly integrating the personality of the Trinity, the group formed by Superman, Wonder Woman and Batman, and collecting artifacts related to their personal origins.

Having been implied to be connected to the Riddler, Enigma is later revealed to be his counterpart from the antimatter universe. His backstory is later recounted: as the Quizmaster, Edward Nashton had formed the Justice Underground to challenge the Crime Syndicate of America's superiority. Eventually, Nashton's face was burned by Ultraman's heat vision, his wife and infant son were killed, and his daughter was nearly killed. In retaliation, Nashton set out to change the antimatter universe, using the power of the Trinity to do so.

Enigma and his allies successfully steal the Trinity's power, only for them to return as godlike beings. Enigma realizes that what they received was not the totality of the power they could have accrued and he devises a plan to complete this power, bickering with Morgaine over her usage of power. Ultimately, their second attempt fails when the Trinity returns and Morgaine strikes a deal with Krona, hoping to gain his power by giving him the living soul of Earth in return for the soul of Enigma's daughter. Enigma refuses and attacks Morgaine and Krona, only for S.P.H.E.R.E. to save him. When the Earth's soul is released, it rejects Krona and restores Enigma's daughter to life, fusing her soul with that of Krona's Void Hound. When the conflict is over, the two return to the antimatter universe, hoping to give its inhabitants hope.

== Other characters named Enigma ==
There are several unrelated characters called Enigma:

- Enigma was the name of an unnamed criminal who fought Blue Beetle and Question.
- In Vertigo Comics, there is a superhero who calls himself Enigma.

== In other media ==
An original incarnation of Enigma named Dr. Evelyn Rhyme appears in the second season of Batwoman, portrayed by Laura Mennell. This version is a hypnotherapist and mutual associate of Safiyah Sohail and Black Mask who wields a cane capable of injecting drugs into people. Additionally, she erased Beth Kane's memories and created her "Alice" persona under Sohail's orders.
