= Bat-Mite =

Comic book character

- Bat-Mite as depicted in World's Finest Comics #113 (November 1960). Art by Curt Swan.

Publication information
- Publisher: DC Comics
- First appearance: Detective Comics #267 (May 1959)
- Created by: Bill Finger (writer); Sheldon Moldoff (artist)

In-story information
- Species: Fifth Dimensional Imp (Zrfffian)
- Place of origin: Fifth Dimension
- Team affiliations: Justice League of Mites
- Supporting character of: Batman
- Abilities: Nigh-omnipotence; Reality warping; Immortality; Invulnerability; Fifth dimensional physiology; Advanced technology

Bat-Mite is a character appearing in American comic books published by DC Comics. Bat-Mite is an imp similar to Mister Mxyzptlk. Depicted as a small, childlike man in an ill-fitting copy of Batman's costume, Bat-Mite possesses what appear to be near-infinite magical powers which could be considered nigh-omnipotence, but he actually uses highly advanced technology from the fifth dimension that cannot be understood by humans' limited three-dimensional views. Unlike Mxyzptlk, Bat-Mite idolizes his superhero target and thus he has visited Batman on various occasions, often setting up strange and ridiculous events so that he could see his hero in action. Bat-Mite is more of a nuisance than a supervillain, and often departs of his own accord upon realizing that he has angered his idol.

Bat-Mite has appeared in various media outside comics, primarily in association with Batman. Paul Reubens and Lou Scheimer voice the character in Batman: The Brave and the Bold and The New Adventures of Batman respectively.

== Publication history ==
Bat-Mite made his first appearance in Detective Comics #267 (May 1959) in a story titled "Batman Meets Bat-Mite", and was created by writer Bill Finger and artist Sheldon Moldoff.

Bat-Mite was retired from the comic in 1964, when editor Julius Schwartz instituted a "New Look" Batman that shed some of the sillier elements in the series.

Bat-Mite appeared in a self-titled six-issue miniseries which lasted from June to November 2015.

== Fictional character history ==
Cover to Detective Comics #267 (May 1959), the first appearance of Bat-Mite, art by Curt Swan.

=== Pre-Crisis ===
Bat-Mite regularly appeared in Batman, Detective Comics, and World's Finest Comics for five years. Bat-Mite and Mr. Mxyzptlk teamed up four times in the pages of World's Finest Comics to antagonize Superman and Batman. In 1964, however, when the Batman titles were revamped under new editor Julius Schwartz, Bat-Mite vanished along with other members of the Batman extended family, such as Batwoman, Bat-Girl, and Ace the Bat-Hound.

After this, only three more Bat-Mite stories were published in the pre-Crisis DC Universe: two more Bat-Mite/Mxyzptlk team ups in World's Finest Comics #152 (August 1965) and #169 (September 1967) (which were not edited by Schwartz, but by Mort Weisinger), and "Bat-Mite's New York Adventure" from Detective Comics #482 (February–March 1979), in which the imp visits the DC Comics offices and insists that he be given his own feature in a Batman comic. This story featured protestors with picket signs shouting "We want Bat-Mite!" outside the Tishman Building (where DC's editorial offices were located at the time), and was accompanied by an editorial comment that this story was published to acknowledge the real-life requests of fans for this character's revival.

=== Post-Crisis ===
After the continuity-changing 1985 limited series Crisis on Infinite Earths was published, Bat-Mite was mostly removed from the Batman comics canon. Bat-Mite made an appearance in Batman: Legends of the Dark Knight #38, although he may have been the hallucination of a drug-addled criminal named Bob Overdog. This comic states that Bat-Mite is one of the many admirers of superheroes from another dimension. This version of Bat-Mite later returned in Batman: Mitefall — A Legends of the Dark Mite Special, a one-shot book which was both part of, and a parody of, the Batman storyline Knightfall (with Overdog briefly in the Jean-Paul Valley role). In #6 of the 1999 Batman and Superman: World's Finest miniseries, Mr. Mxyzptlk encounters Bat-Mite, shortly after being mistaken for him by Overdog. While in this story, the post-Crisis Bat-Mite encounters Batman for the first time, Superman and Batman subsequently concluded that Mxyzptlk had created him, inspired by Overdog's ravings.

Bat-Mite also appeared in the 2000 one-shot Elseworlds comic special World's Funnest, in which he battles Mr. Mxyzptlk, destroying the Pre-Crisis multiverse and the post-Crisis DC Universe, as well as the Elseworlds of Kingdom Come, Batman: The Dark Knight Returns, and the DC Animated Universe.

The first post-Infinite Crisis appearance of Bat-Mite was in Batman #672, written by Grant Morrison. Batman is confronted with Bat-Mite (or "Might") after being shot in the chest and suffering a heart attack. Might, who bears a green insectoid creature on his back, claims to have come from "Space B at the Fivefold Expansion of Zrfff".

After Batman transforms himself into "the Batman of Zur-En-Arrh", Might counsels Zur-En-Arrh, a 'back-up' personality manufactured by Bruce himself to keep Batman able to fight in case he was mindwiped, or driven to insanity. Batman #680 reveals that Might is a product of Batman's imagination, representing the last vestiges of his rational mind.

Bat-Mite appeared in a self-titled six-issue miniseries which lasted from June to November 2015.

Bat-Mite appears in the four-part story "Impossible" in World's Finest #26 through #29, June through September 2024. The story also features Superman, Batman, Robin, Jimmy Olsen and Mr. Mxyzptlk.

== Powers and abilities ==
Bat-Mite, as a fifth-dimensional Imp, has nigh-omnipotence, which is shown as near-infinite magical power. Bat-Mite has powers and skills identical to that of Mister Mxyzptlk (but not his weaknesses), such as the ability to manipulate spacetime. He has access to various bat-weapons like his hero, Batman.

== Publications ==
=== 2015 series ===
- Bat-Mite (2016-02-17): Includes Bat-Mite #1-6 and a sneak peek story from Convergence: Supergirl: Matrix #2.

== In other media ==
=== Television ===
Bat-Mite (left) as depicted in The New Adventures of Batman.

- Bat-Mite appears in The New Adventures of Batman, voiced by Lou Scheimer.
- An animatronic of Bat-Mite appears in the Batman: The Animated Series episode "Deep Freeze", voiced by Pat Fraley.
- Bat-Mite appears in Batman: The Brave and the Bold, voiced by Paul Reubens.
- Bat-Mite appears in Lego DC Comics: Batman Be-Leaguered, voiced again by Paul Reubens.
- A stuffed Bat-Mite toy appears in DC Super Hero Girls.

=== Video games ===
- Bat-Mite appears as an assist character in the Wii version of Batman: The Brave and the Bold - The Videogame. Additionally, he can be summoned and controlled using a running copy of the game's Nintendo DS counterpart.
- Bat-Mite appears as a character summon in Scribblenauts Unmasked: A DC Comics Adventure.
- Bat-Mite appears as a playable character and game navigator in Lego Batman 3: Beyond Gotham, voiced by Roger Craig Smith.
- Bat-Mite appears in Lego Batman: Legacy of the Dark Knight, voiced by Adam Diggle.

== Reception ==
In Handbook of Comics and Graphic Narratives, Matt Yockey writes, "Bat-Mite pointedly represents the intersection of utopia and trauma in the superhero genre and he signals that the mastery over trauma is an essential step toward realizing a utopian ideal. His home in the 'fifth dimension' and his magical powers locate Bat-Mite in the utopian realm, yet he turns to Batman as his ideal, suggesting that contact with trauma is in fact indispensable to the expression of a utopian desire."
