= Warp (comics) =

DC Comics character

Publication information
- Publisher: DC Comics
- First appearance: The New Teen Titans #14 (December 1981)
- Created by: Marv Wolfman (script); George Pérez (plot, pencils)

In-story information
- Full name: Emil LaSalle
- Species: Metahuman
- Team affiliations: Secret Society of Super Villains; Brotherhood of Evil; Society of Sin; Suicide Squad
- Abilities: Flight; Portal creation

Warp (Emil LaSalle) is a character appearing in American comic books published by DC Comics. Primarily an enemy of the Teen Titans, Warp has been a member of the Brotherhood of Evil, Secret Society of Super Villains, and Suicide Squad at varying points in his history.

Warp has made limited appearances in media outside comics. Xander Berkeley voices the character in Teen Titans (2003), where he is depicted as a time traveler originating from the 22nd century and a member of the Brotherhood of Evil. Elias Toufexis portrays Warp in Smallville, where he is depicted as a member of the Suicide Squad.

== Publication history ==
Warp first appeared in The New Teen Titans #14 (December 1981) and was created by Marv Wolfman and George Pérez.

== Fictional character biography ==
Emil LaSalle is a French supervillain who previously fought Phantasmo and Fleur-de-Lis prior to being approached by the Brain, Monsieur Mallah, and Phobia to join the Brotherhood of Evil. At first, Warp refuses. After being attacked by Captain Toulon and trapped on Earth-11, Warp changes his mind and joins the Brotherhood.

In "Infinite Crisis", Warp appears as a member of Alexander Luthor Jr.'s Secret Society of Super Villains. He is seen working with Doctor Psycho to free Doomsday from captivity near the center of the Earth. During One Year Later, Warp returns to the Brotherhood of Evil.

In "Salvation Run", Warp is among the villains who are exiled to another planet. Lex Luthor uses him, among other villains, as a component in a teleportation device. Warp is killed when the device self-destructs, taking out the approaching Parademons.

In 2011, "The New 52" rebooted the DC universe. Warp appears as a member of the Brotherhood of Evil. He, Phobia, and Plasmus appear as enemies of Blue Beetle, seeking to take his scarab.

During the "Forever Evil" storyline, Warp is among the villains recruited by the Crime Syndicate to join the Secret Society of Super Villains.

In "Year of the Villain", Joker captures Warp, tortures him, and uses Mad Hatter's technology to control him. Joker has Warp rescue a beaten Lex Luthor before having him commit suicide someplace where nobody can find him.

Warp is later revived and joins the Suicide Squad.

== Powers and abilities ==
Warp can open warp portals between any two locations of his choosing. However, overuse of this ability exhausts him. He can also fly.

== In other media ==
=== Television ===
- Warp appears in Teen Titans, voiced by Xander Berkeley. This version is a time-traveling supervillain from a century in the future and a member of the Brotherhood of Evil.
- Warp appears in the Smallville episode "Ambush", portrayed by Elias Toufexis. This version is a member of the Suicide Squad who lacks the ability to fly.

=== Video games ===
Warp appears as a character summon in Scribblenauts Unmasked: A DC Comics Adventure.
