= Brotherhood of Evil =

Group of DC Comics supervillains

Publication information
- Publisher: DC Comics
- First appearance: Doom Patrol #86 (March 1964)
- Created by: Arnold Drake; Bruno Premiani

In-story information
- Member(s): The Brain (leader); Monsieur Mallah; Gemini; Warp; Plasmus; Houngan; Phobia; Trinity; Elephant Man; Goldilocks; General Immortus; Madame Rouge; Garguax

The Brotherhood of Evil is a group of DC Comics supervillains, archenemies of the Doom Patrol, Justice League and Teen Titans.

The Brotherhood of Evil appears in the third season of the HBO Max series Doom Patrol.

== Publication history ==
The Brotherhood of Evil first appeared in Doom Patrol #86 (March 1964) and were created by Arnold Drake and Bruno Premiani.

== Fictional team history ==
=== Origins ===
The Brotherhood of Evil is founded by the enigmatic villain the Brain. In the beginning, the group's motivation is world domination. It is later revealed that Brain's true purpose for the Brotherhood was to destroy Niles Caulder and his "colleagues". Caulder murdered Brain so he could turn the scientist into Robotman without Brain's consent, but his plans were foiled by the Brain's creation, the intelligent gorilla Monsieur Mallah, who preserved his brain in a robotic container. Brain swore revenge against Caulder and his "pets", the Doom Patrol, who like Brain were often victims of experimentation in order to create an army of super-heroes through the ruining of innocent lives (several members were experiments of the Nazi war criminal General Zahl).

The original line-up consists of the Brain, Mallah, and their first recruit, the shapeshifter Madame Rouge. They battle the Doom Patrol on a regular basis and are later briefly joined by fellow Doom Patrol villains General Immortus and the alien Garguax. The group is aided by the clumsy henchman Mr. Morden, who often operates robotic devices for the Brain.

The group's constant failure to defeat the Doom Patrol, combined with the growing romantic attraction between Madame Rouge and Niles Caulder, leads to Rouge breaking free of the mental conditioning the Brain used to recruit her. Rouge quits the Brotherhood to join the Doom Patrol, but the Brain quickly recaptures Rouge and brainwashes her again. However, Rouge turns against the Brotherhood and launches a missile to destroy the Brain and Mallah.

Aided by General Zahl, Madame Rouge captures the Doom Patrol and threatens to destroy Codsville, a small Maine fishing village, with a nuclear weapon. The Doom Patrol members reluctantly choose death and sacrifice themselves to save Codsville.

=== Return ===
Madame Rouge and Zahl remain in hiding for many years, gathering an army of minions to conquer Zandia. Meanwhile, the Doom Patrol had reformed, with Robotman as the only surviving original member. Along with Mento, the Doom Patrol avoid going after Rouge for the murders of Doom Patrol as they did not want to involve Beast Boy in their vendetta. When Beast Boy (now calling himself "Changeling") joins the New Teen Titans, the two adult Doom Patrol members go after Rouge. Both are defeated: Mento is tortured until he suffers a mental breakdown, while Robotman is left deactivated and hung outside as a warning to trespassers.

The New Teen Titans go looking for Robotman and Mento when Beast Boy does not hear back from them, which ultimately leads to a battle with Rouge and Zahl. To their surprise, the heroes are aided by the Brain and Mallah and their new version of the Brotherhood of Evil. Brain and Mallah had predicted Rouge's betrayal and went into hiding, leaving decoys that Rouge ultimately destroyed. Rouge and Zahl both die while fighting Beast Boy and Robotman respectively. The Brain's new Brotherhood leaves the Titans, knowing that they would soon come into conflict.

The Brain and the new Brotherhood of Evil come into conflict with Brother Blood, whose life-restoring blood pits Brain seeks to use to prolong his own life. To deal with Blood's inhuman powers, the group repeatedly attack the Titans to kidnap Raven and force her to aid them in defeating Blood. They ultimately succeed in kidnapping Raven with the Brain's influence and the fear-manipulating power of Phobia, briefly turning Raven to the Brotherhood's side. Raven's demonic father Trigon gains control of her body and nearly kills both the Titans and the Brotherhood before being stopped by Donna Troy.

The Brotherhood resurfaces again in Zandia as the New Teen Titans battle to rescue Raven and Nightwing from Brother Blood's cult. During the battle, Brain and Mallah gain access to the blood pits of Blood while the Brotherhood captures Jericho. A cave-in traps Mallah and Brain underground, separating them from their team.

Meanwhile, Mr. Morden, now transformed into Mr. Nobody, attempts to reform the Brotherhood in Paris, but eventually decides that the name and focus of the group should be changed to reflect the fact that "the universe is a drooling idiot with no fashion sense". Nobody founds the Brotherhood of Dada, which battles the Doom Patrol on two occasions.

Meanwhile, Brain and Mallah make their way to the United States and steal one of Robotman's spare bodies for the Brain. Now with a body, Brain declares his undying love for Mallah just as the spare body explodes. The robot body had gained sentience, a fact the two were unaware of, and had vowed to destroy itself rather than have a human brain inserted into it again.

The rest of the Brotherhood rechristen themselves the "Society of Sin" and recruited a new female member named Trinity. This incarnation of the Brotherhood would only exist for one battle with the Titans before the group returned to their existing name and dropped Trinity from its roster.

In The New Titans #97-99, Brain and Mallah return to the Brotherhood with Rita Farr, the sole member of the original Doom Patrol who had not been resurrected. However, Brain is suffering from severe mental deterioration; Mallah proclaims that only Mento's helmet could save him. The group force Changeling to steal the helmet for them in exchange for Brain helping restore Cyborg, who has been rendered a brain-dead automaton. Changeling steals the helmet, but quickly changes his mind about giving it to Brain, leading "Rita Farr" to make her presence known and attack her son from behind while "Mallah" distracts Changeling with energy-based abilities that he did not possess beforehand. This causes the Brotherhood to realize that the three are not who they claimed to be, leading to Warp escaping and bringing the Titans in to save Changeling and his teammates from the fake Elasti-Girl, Brain, and Mallah. Several weeks later, the imposters attack the Titans again and are revealed to be energy beings who serve a sentient alien computer called Technis, which needed to assimilate Cyborg in order to survive.

=== Brotherhood lives again ===
The Brotherhood of Evil are not seen during the second half of the 1990s and would not return until 2005, in JSA Classified #1-3. Brain and Mallah returned a year prior during the Identity Crisis event. The Titans interrogate the two to learn the location of Plasmus and Warp, who are suspects in the murder of Sue Dibny.

With Madame Rouge's daughter Gemini now a member, the group reunites with Phobia, Mallah, and Brain and joins the Secret Society of Super Villains under the command of inner circle member Deathstroke. Deathstroke has the group acquire Chemo for the Society. Chemo is dropped onto the city of Blüdhaven, killing several million people. Furthermore, Warp is recruited by Doctor Psycho to free Doomsday for the Society as part of the group's final endgame against Earth's heroes.

After the one-year gap between the end of Infinite Crisis and Teen Titans (vol. 3) #34, the Brotherhood has gained members Elephant Man and Goldilocks while losing Phobia, who opts to stay a freelance villain but maintains ties with the Brotherhood.

The Brotherhood returns to their independent roots and launches a massive crime wave independent of the remains of the Secret Society of Super-Villains. Their goals include cloning a new body for the Brain as well as creating unstable clones of existing super-heroes, putting the team in conflict with the Teen Titans, Doom Patrol, and the Outsiders.

The Brain, Monsieur Mallah, General Immortus, Phobia, Plasmus, and Warp appear in the Salvation Run mini-series. In Salvation Run #4, the Brain and Mallah are killed by Gorilla Grodd. Plasmus and Warp are used by Lex Luthor as a power source for a teleportation device and are seemingly killed when it self-destructs.

=== The New 52 ===
In September 2011, The New 52 rebooted DC's continuity. In this new timeline, the Brotherhood of Evil is featured as its members Phobia, Plasmus, and Warp compete with La Dama's agents to obtain the scarab. The scarab ends up in the possession of Jaime Reyes, who becomes Blue Beetle and manages to fight off both villain groups. To ensure that Phobia, Plasmus, and Warp succeed in reclaiming the scarab, a robotic gorilla named Silverback is sent to meet up with them. Silverback warns the three villains that if they fail again, he will be the one who will "clean up the mess".

== Membership ==
The Brotherhood of Evil at its original Doom Patrol series peak: Madame Rouge, General Immortus, Garguax, The Brain and Monsieur Mallah.

=== Brotherhood of Evil ===
- The Brain
- Monsieur Mallah
- Madame Rouge
- Garguax
- General Immortus

=== Second Brotherhood of Evil/Society of Sin ===
- The Brain
- Monsieur Mallah
- Phobia
- Houngan
- Plasmus
- Warp
- Trinity
- Elasti-Girl (imposter)

=== Third Brotherhood of Evil ===
- The Brain
- Monsieur Mallah
- Gemini
- Houngan
- Phobia
- Plasmus
- Warp
- Elephant Man
- Goldilocks

=== Fourth Brotherhood of Evil ===
- Phobia
- Plasmus
- Silverback
- Warp

=== Fifth Brotherhood of Evil ===
- The Brain - Dies in Unstoppable Doom Patrol #1
- Monsieur Mallah
- General Immortus
- Gemini
- Doctor Inside-Out
- Elephant Man
- Goldilocks
- Houngan
- Lady Tiger Fist
- Plasmus
- The Quiz
- Shrapnel
- Veiniac
- Warp

== In other media ==
=== Television ===
The Brotherhood of Evil as depicted in Teen Titans.

- The Brotherhood of Evil appear in Teen Titans, consisting of the Brain, Monsieur Mallah, Madame Rouge and General Immortus. Initially fighting the Doom Patrol, they later recruit Doctor Light, Psimon, Cinderblock, Red X, Adonis, Trident, Puppet King, Johnny Rancid, Mumbo, Professor Chang, Plasmus, Angel, Warp, Phobia, Punk Rocket, Killer Moth, Kardiak, XL Terrestrial, Katarou, Atlas, André LeBlanc, Control Freak, Wintergreen, I.N.S.T.I.G.A.T.O.R., the H.I.V.E. Headmistress, the H.I.V.E. Five, Wrestling Star, Kitten, Fang, Mad Mod, the Witch, Steamroller, Malchior, Mother Mae-Eye, Master of Games, Ding Dong Daddy, Newfu, Bob, Overload, Private H.I.V.E., and Cheshire.
- The Brotherhood of Evil appears in Doom Patrol, consisting of the Brain and Monsieur Mallah, with Eric Morden and Garguax as former members from the 1940s and Madame Rouge attempting to join them until the Brain betrays her.

=== Miscellaneous ===
The Brotherhood of Evil appear in Teen Titans Go!. Additionally, a heroic, alternate universe version of the Brotherhood called the Brotherhood of Justice appear in issue #48, consisting of General Immortus, Doctor Light, Mammoth, Madame Rouge, and Psimon.
