= DC Nation Shorts =

US animated series

- Genre: Action; Comedy; Shorts; Anthology; Superhero
- Starring: Various
- Country of origin: United States
- Original language: English
- No. of episodes: 162

Production
- Executive producer: Sam Register
- Production companies: DC Entertainment; Warner Bros. Animation

Original release
- Network: Cartoon Network
- Release: November 11, 2011 – August 2, 2014

DC Nation Shorts is an animated series of shorts featuring characters from DC Comics from a variety of different titles that aired on Cartoon Network on Saturdays at 10/9c.

== Production ==
In March 2012, the shorts premiered as part of the DC Nation block, produced by Warner Bros. Animation. They aired alongside Green Lantern: The Animated Series and Young Justice, as well as with Beware the Batman and Teen Titans Go! in 2013. Warner Bros. revived the Teen Titans animated series as Teen Titans Go!, based on the New Teen Titans shorts. Despite having one Cartoon Network / Warner Bros. Animation short, Swaroop (aired during The Big Pick contest), DC Nation Shorts was the first and only Cartoon Network original series co-produced by DC Entertainment and Warner Bros. Animation.

In 2011, Cartoon Network executive Sam Register promised new content every week on the block in addition to the shorts: "...whether that's a new show or an interstitial or a short".

== Series ==
Title	Description	Note(s)
Amethyst, Princess of Gemworld	Seven shorts based on Amethyst, Princess of Gemworld (voiced by Sophie Oda) as she is brought into Gemworld to fight the forces of Dark Opal (voiced by Eric Bauza).	The shorts were created by Brianne Drouhard with David Production.
Animal Man	Shorts about the DC superhero Animal Man (voiced by "Weird Al" Yankovic), who saves animals instead of the people who are actually in danger.	
Batman Beyond	A short series about Batman Beyond.	Shown in 2014 during the 75th anniversary of Batman. Will Friedle and Kevin Conroy reprising their roles as Terry McGinnis and Bruce Wayne.
Batman of Shanghai	Shorts about Batman (voiced by Kirk Thornton), Bane (voiced by Kirk Thornton), and Catwoman (voiced by Stephanie Sheh).	It was re-imagined in 1930s Shanghai and animated by Wolf Smoke.
Batman: Strange Days	A short series about Batman (voiced by Kevin Conroy) as he fights Hugo Strange (voiced by Brian George).	Written, storyboarded and directed by Bruce Timm.
Blue Beetle		During the premiere of Green Lantern: The Animated Series, the preview for DC Nation included clips from the Blue Beetle trailer starring Garrett Plotkin.
Creature Commandos	Featuring the sometimes-successful misadventures of a team of superheroes modeled after the classic film monster canon, led by Lt. Matthew Shrieve (voiced by Chris Cox) and consisting of werewolf Warren Griffith (voiced by Dana Snyder), vampire Sgt. Vincent Velcro (voiced by Kevin Shinick), Frankenstein Monster-like Elliot Taylor (voiced by Kevin Shinick), and snake-haired Dr. Myrra Rhodes (voiced by Rachel Ramras). A humorous retelling of the Creature Commandos.	
DC Super Pets	Shorts based on the Super Pets characters, starring Krypto the Superdog (voiced by David Kaye), Streaky the Supercat (voiced by Debra Wilson), Ace the Bat-Hound (voiced by Diedrich Bader), Robin Robin (voiced by Maria Bamford), and B'Dg (voiced by Elisha Yaffe).	Created by Franco Aureliani and Art Baltazar.
DC's World's Funnest	Shorts revolving around Batman, Robin, the Joker, Catwoman, and Superman.	Animation directed by Rich Webber of Aardman Animations, and produced by John Woolley.
Deadman	Shorts about the ghost superhero Deadman (voiced by Matt L. Jones).	Produced by C. H. Greenblatt.
Demonstrations	Real world demonstrations of tools and techniques employed by superheroes and supervillains featuring professionals like Anthony De Longis and Jack Dagger.	
Doctor Fate	Shorts about the DC superhero Doctor Fate.	
Doom Patrol	Shorts about the DC superhero team the Doom Patrol, consisting of the Chief (voiced by Jeffrey Combs), Elasti-Girl (voiced by Kari Wahlgren), Negative Man (voiced by Clancy Brown), and Robotman (voiced by David Kaye). The Doom Patrol fights different villains including General Immortus (voiced by Clancy Brown).	
Farm League	Featuring a version of the Just'a Lotta Animals, Farm League stars DC characters as animals including Supermanatee (voiced by David Kaye), Batmongoose (voiced by Diedrich Bader), Wonder Wombat (voiced by Lauren Tom), The Flish (voiced by Jason Marsden), Green Lamprey (voiced by Kevin Michael Richardson), Aquamandrill (voiced by Armin Shimerman), Shazham!, Robin's Egg (voiced by Lauren Tom), Cybug (voiced by Kevin Michael Richardson), Duckseid (voiced by David Kaye), the Croaker (voiced by Kevin Michael Richardson), Cat Cat, Mr. Mxyzchkn (voiced by Jason Marsden), Solomon Bunny, Moo-Face (voiced by Armin Shimerman), Bizarrfo (voiced by Diedrich Bader), Captain Cod (voiced by Eric Bauza), Sinestropotamus (voiced by Jason Marsden), Lex Liger (voiced by Eric Bauza), Craniac (voiced by Armin Shimerman), and Ambush Slug.	
Gotham City Impostors		The preview for DC Nation included animation of Gotham City Impostors.
Green Arrow	Shorts about the superhero Green Arrow (voiced by Will Friedle) and his high-tech bow (voiced by Kevin Michael Richardson) as he teams up with Black Canary (voiced by Kari Wahlgren) to defeat Onomatopoeia and his Ono-Bots (voiced by Kevin Michael Richardson).	
Lego Batman	The preview for DC Nation included animation of Lego Batman.	This animation was actually a pair of cut scenes from Lego Batman 2: DC Super Heroes.
MAD Presents...	Shorts based on various DC characters, such as the "Shazamwich!" segment by Nate Theis.	Produced by Mad.
Metal Men	Shorts about Will Magnus (voiced by Corey Burton) and the Metal Men consisting of Gold (voiced by Tom Kenny), Lead (voiced by Tom Kenny), Platinum (voiced by Hynden Walch), Mercury (voiced by Corey Burton), Iron (voiced by Corey Burton), and Tin (voiced by Hynden Walch).	Produced by Evan Dorkin and Sarah Dyer with Augenblick Studios.
New Teen Titans	Shorts about the Teen Titans with Scott Menville, Hynden Walch, Greg Cipes, Tara Strong, and Khary Payton reprising their roles of Robin, Starfire, Beast Boy, Raven, and Cyborg, respectively.	They are drawn more in a super-deformed style, but the basic animation style remains intact. Due to the popularity of the shorts, Cartoon Network revived Teen Titans as Teen Titans Go!, a half-hour show that is more comedic and lighthearted than its predecessor but still featuring the original cast. Teen Titans Go! premiered on April 23, 2013.
Plastic Man	Shorts about the DC superhero Plastic Man (voiced by Tom Kenny) in his daily misadventures fighting supervillains, such as the Tuxedo (voiced by Carlos Alazraqui) and Lady Granite (voiced by Jill Talley), and teaming up with Batman (voiced by Kevin Michael Richardson).	It is based on the Puddle Trouble pilot developed by Andy Suriano, Tom Kenny, and Stephen DeStefano.
Riddler	Shorts about Batman villain the Riddler (voiced by "Weird Al" Yankovic) as he tries to best Batman (voiced by Kevin Michael Richardson) with his riddles.	
Shade, the Changing Man	Shorts about the DC superhero Shade, the Changing Man (voiced by Benjamin Diskin).	
Shazam!	Shorts depicting Billy Batson (voiced by Tara Strong) becoming Shazam (voiced by David Kaye).	
Super Best Friends Forever	Series of shorts about Wonder Girl (voiced by Grey DeLisle), Batgirl (voiced by Tara Strong), and Supergirl (voiced by Nicole Sullivan) joining to fight crime.	Developed by Lauren Faust, the series lasted for 5 episodes. Faust would later use it as a basis for DC Super Hero Girls.
スーパーマン @ Tokyo/Baby Superman	Shorts about a baby named Kenta (vocal effects provided by Jeff Bennett) who is granted the powers of the Superman of Tokyo (voiced by Blair Underwood) upon wearing his cape as a diaper.	Produced by David Production
Sword of the Atom	Shorts about the DC superhero Atom (voiced by Jason Marsden).	These shorts are based on the series Sword of the Atom.
Tales of Metropolis	Shorts about the city of Metropolis featuring Lois Lane (voiced by Maria Bamford), Jimmy Olsen (voiced by Elisha Yaffe), Bizarro (voiced by David Kaye), Brainiac (voiced by Armin Shimerman), Superman (voiced by David Kaye), and Batman (voiced by Kevin Conroy).	
Thunder and Lightning	Shorts about the DC superhero Black Lightning (voiced by Blair Underwood) and his super-powered daughters Thunder (voiced by Cree Summer) and Lightning (voiced by Masasa Moyo). Thunder and Lightning receive their costumes from Peter Gambi (voiced by Jeff Bennett) and help their father fight crime.	
Vibe	Shorts about the DC superhero Vibe (voiced by Carlos Alazraqui) competing in a break-dancing competition with his sidekick Daniel (voiced by Nika Futterman). Vibe must defeat the robot Extreme-O, created by Professor Ivo (voiced by Jason Marsden), who is disguised as the judge of the breakdancing competition.	
Wonder Woman	Shorts about Wonder Woman (voiced by Susan Eisenberg) and Steve Trevor (voiced by Sean Donnellan) re-imagined in the vein of Starsky and Hutch.	Written and directed by Robert Valley, and produced by No Dice INK Inc.

== Episodes ==
No.	Title	Original release date
1	"DC's World's Funnest #1: Superkids"	November 11, 2011
Superheroes and villains are reimagined with childlike personalities. The Joker does as many jumps and hops as he can in a minute. Superman explains he's not very sporty. Catwoman discusses her mask. Batman runs and jumps off a table. Note: Premiered as part of the DC Nation Preview. Aired as part of DC Nation on May 5, 2012.
2	"New Teen Titans #1: Burp"	November 11, 2011
The Teen Titans eat pizza and belch. Note: Premiered as part of the DC Nation Preview. Aired as part of DC Nation on June 30, 2012.
3	"Boxing Glove Arrow"	March 3, 2012
Anthony De Longis demonstrates Green Arrow's boxing glove arrow.
4	"DC's World's Funnest #2: Heroic Goofballs"	March 3, 2012
Batman shows off his "superpowers" to Robin. Superman ponders why Robin is called "Robin". The Joker jokes that he prefers not to play jokes on people. Catwoman shows off her long jumping abilities.
5	"Plastic Man in... Super Hero Sketch Artist"	March 3, 2012
Plastic Man uses his stretching abilities to help an elderly woman identify the man who stole her purse.
6	"Batarang"	March 10, 2012
Jack Dagger demonstrates the batarang.
7	"New Teen Titans #2: Utility Player"	March 10, 2012
Beast Boy accidentally washes Robin's utility belt and tries to cover it up just as the team faces Doctor Light.
8	"スーパーマン @ Tokyo #1"	March 10, 2012
The Superman of Tokyo is defeated by a giant robot in Tokyo and passes on his cape and powers to baby Kenta. Upon wearing the cape as a diaper, Kenta becomes Baby Superman.
9	"Batmobile"	March 17, 2012
NASCAR driver Trevor Bayne checks out Warner Bros.' collection of Batmobiles from the several Batman films.
10	"Super Best Friends Forever #1: Invisible Joy Ride"	March 17, 2012
Supergirl and Batgirl try to convince Wonder Girl to fly Wonder Woman's Invisible Jet.
11	"MAD Presents... Shazamwich!"	March 17, 2012
From MAD, a commercial has Billy Batson transforming into Captain Marvel to try and convince a friend to try the Shazamwich.
12	"Character Profile: Plastic Man"	March 24, 2012
The origin story of Plastic Man is revealed.
13	"DC's World's Funnest #3"	March 24, 2012
Superman discusses how Wonder Woman wears very little. The Joker talks about his new shoes. Batman shows how he fights the wind. Catwoman demonstrates how she has to be sneaky.
14	"Plastic Man in... The Many and the Fowl"	March 24, 2012
Plastic Man tries to pay his electric bill, but first has to deal with the Tuxedo, Lady Granite, and the Fowl when it comes to mailing the payment.
15	"Knockout Gas Arrow"	March 31, 2012
Anthony De Longis demonstrates Green Arrow's knockout gas arrow.
16	"New Teen Titans #3: Stream of Consciences"	March 31, 2012
Beast Boy is tempted by a plate of fresh-baked cookies.
17	"スーパーマン @ Tokyo #2"	March 31, 2012
Kenta's mother tries to interview Tokyo's Superman.
18	"Character Profile: Kilowog"	April 7, 2012
The origin story of Kilowog is revealed.
19	"Animal Man #1: Bank Robbery"	April 7, 2012
Animal Man interrupts a bank robbery by Captain Cold to save a mouse that Captain Cold was about to step on. After Animal Man leaves, Captain Cold continues his bank robbery.
20	"Animal Man #2: Train"	April 7, 2012
Animal Man races against time to beat a speeding train in order to get a cow off its track, with a woman also tied to the tracks. After Animal Man saves the cow, the woman slaps Animal Man.
21	"Super Best Friends Forever #2: Time Waits for No Girl"	April 7, 2012
After waiting for her father Commissioner Gordon to go to sleep, Batgirl hurries across the city to stop Poison Ivy.
22	"Batarang #2"	April 14, 2012
Jack Dagger demonstrates throwing two batarangs at once.
23	"MAD Presents... Green Care Bear"	April 14, 2012
Hal Jordan takes on the legacy of the Green Care Bear.
24	"DC's World's Funnest #4"	April 14, 2012
Batman runs around and Superman talks about constellations.
25	"WonderCon #1"	April 21, 2012
Cosplayers are interviewed at WonderCon.
26	"Plastic Man in... Boobtube"	April 21, 2012
Flatscreen captures Plastic Man in a television.
27	"New Teen Titans #4: Turn Back the Clock"	April 21, 2012
Mad Mod is trying to use a time machine to turn back time in order to regain his youth.
28	"Character Profile: Blue Beetle"	April 28, 2012
The origin story of Blue Beetle is revealed.
29	"Super Best Friends Forever #3: Grounded"	April 28, 2012
Supergirl is grounded and Superman will make sure she stays in her room.
30	"MAD Presents... Teen Titanic"	April 28, 2012
Titanic is parodied with the Teen Titans in this trailer spoof.
31	"WonderCon #2"	May 5, 2012
Cosplayers are interviewed at WonderCon.
32	"Animal Man #3: Beach"	May 5, 2012
Black Manta invades the beach and Animal Man defeats him after he had knocked down a crab's sand castle.
33	"Animal Man #4: Invasion"	May 5, 2012
Darkseid and his Parademons invade Earth as Animal Man scolds a dog's owner for tying his dog to a parking meter.
34	"Robin's Collapsible Bo Staff"	May 12, 2012
A martial artist demonstrates the use of Robin's collapsible bo staff.
35	"New Teen Titans #5: Blackfire's Babysitter"	May 12, 2012
Starfire is asked to babysit her sister Blackfire's children.
36	"Mad Presents... That's What Super Friends Are For"	May 12, 2012
The rest of the Super Friends perform a song and dance for Superman, Batman, and Wonder Woman questioning their group's name.
37	"Character Profile: Animal Man"	May 19, 2012
The origin story of Animal Man is revealed.
38	"Vibe #1: Enter Extremo Pt. 1"	May 19, 2012
Vibe enters a breakdancing competition.
39	"Vibe #2: Enter Extremo Pt. 2"	May 19, 2012
During the breakdancing competition, Vibe battles Dr. Ivo's android Extremo.
40	"Sword of the Atom #1: Eye of the Storm"	May 26, 2012
The Atom crash lands into the jungle.
41	"Super Best Friends Forever #4: Name Game"	May 26, 2012
While battling the Cheetah, the girls debate if they should call their group the Super Best Friends Forever.
42	"Character Profile: The Flash"	June 2, 2012
The origin story of the Flash is revealed.
43	"Sword of the Atom #2: A Choice of Dooms"	June 2, 2012
Atom battles a snake and the Morlaidhans.
44	"New Teen Titans #6: Cyborg the Lifeguard"	June 2, 2012
Cyborg acts as a lifeguard at a pool.
45	"Kid Flash's Dodging"	June 9, 2012
Demonstration of Kid Flash's ability to dodge attacks.
46	"Sword of the Atom #3: Rattling the Cage"	June 9, 2012
The Atom and Taren battle for their lives in the Pit.
47	"New Teen Titans #7: Taped Before a Live Studio Audience"	June 9, 2012
Robin and Cyborg split their lives using duct tape.
48	"Joker's Playing Cards"	June 16, 2012
Jack Dagger demonstrates the Joker's playing cards as a weapon.
49	"Sword of the Atom #4: Battle of the Tiny Titans"	June 16, 2012
The Atom must battle Taren in gladiatorial combat.
50	"Mad Presents... The Curious Case of Benjamin Batman"	June 16, 2012
The Curious Case of Benjamin Button is parodied as Batman ages like Benjamin Button in this trailer spoof.
51	"Nightwing's Movement"	June 23, 2012
An athlete demonstrates Nightwing's movement with running and acrobatics.
52	"The Tumbler"	July 14, 2012
Specifications are given about the Tumbler from the Christopher Nolan series of Batman films.
53	"Batman of Shanghai #1: Catwoman"	July 14, 2012
Set in Shanghai 1930, Catwoman steals an important scroll and must battle to keep it (a cameo is made by Bane).
54	"Mad Presents... Batman Family Feud"	July 14, 2012
When Batman hears that the Riddler is going to rob a television studio, Batman, Robin, Batgirl, and Alfred enter Family Feud only to risk failure because of their peculiar habits. Batman makes a deal with the Riddler for the questions to skew towards their lifestyle in order to win.
55	"San Diego Comic-Con"	July 28, 2012
Cosplayers at the 2012 San Diego Comic-Con are interviewed.
56	"Batman of Shanghai #2: Bane"	July 28, 2012
Bane appears and obtains the Scroll of Destiny.
57	"Batman of Shanghai #3: Bat-Man"	July 28, 2012
Batman battles Bane and Catwoman for the scroll.
58	"New Teen Titans #8: Red X Unmasked"	August 4, 2012
The Titans capture Red X, but are unable to uncover his identity.
59	"Boxing Glove Arrow #2"	September 1, 2012
Anthony De Longis demonstrates Green Arrow's boxing glove arrow's capability for distance and accuracy.
60	"Character Profile: Batgirl"	September 22, 2012
The origin story of Batgirl is revealed.
61	"Flash's Agility"	September 29, 2012
A demonstration is done with a runner performing as the Flash in an obstacle course inspired by Trickster.
62	"New Teen Titans #9: Gamma Rays and You"	September 29, 2012
The Titans explain gamma rays.
63	"Super Best Friends Forever #5: Solomon Grundy Don't Fight Girls"	September 29, 2012
When Solomon Grundy begins rampaging, the SBFF show up to stop him. Only, Grundy don't fight girls.
64	"Batarang #3"	October 6, 2012
Jack Dagger demonstrates the destructive power of the batarang.
65	"New Teen Titans #10: Titans in Love"	October 6, 2012
Segments include "Raven in Love" and "Robin in Love".
66	"DC's World's Funnest #5"	October 6, 2012
Joker captures Robin as Batman comes to the rescue and Catwoman debates Batman's choice of costume.
67	"New Teen Titans #11: Titanimal Kingdom"	November 10, 2012
Mumbo transforms the Titans into Titanimals and showcases them on his nature show.
68	"New Teen Titans #12: Kidz Korner 4 Kidz"	November 17, 2012
The Titans put on a children's TV show.
69	"New Teen Titans #13: Groundhog Minute"	November 24, 2012
The Titans are stuck in a time loop when baby Warp keeps biting his time disk.
70	"New Teen Titans #14: Apprentice Part III"	December 1, 2012
Larry the Titan makes a fan-made continuation of the "Apprentice" episode, with Larry as "Robin" and Silkie as "Starfire".
71	"New Teen Titans #15: Bad Dad"	December 8, 2012
Raven's father Trigon visits her at Titans Tower.
72	"New Teen Titans #16: Lightning Round"	December 15, 2012
Beast Boy goes on Control Freak's new game show called "Quiz Freak", where he competes against Brain and Psimon.
73	"New Teen Titans #17: Mayhem at First Sight"	December 22, 2012
Mumbo and Mother Mae-Eye meet, fall in love, and decide to get married.
74	"Character Profile: Cyborg"	January 5, 2013
The origin story of Cyborg is revealed.
75	"Thunder and Lightning #1: Clothes Make the Hero"	January 5, 2013
Black Lightning gets a new costume from tailor Peter Gambi when Doctor Polaris interrupts by attacking the city. Leaving behind his daughters Thunder and Lightning, Gambi surprises the sisters with their own costumes.
76	"Amethyst, Princess of Gemworld: Level 1: Your Quest Begins"	January 5, 2013
A young girl named Amy Winston is playing the handheld video game "Amethyst, Princess of Gemworld". She is unable to defeat the evil Dark Opal with Prince Topaz only to be magically transported to Gemworld as the long-lost Princess Amethyst.
77	"Amethyst, Princess of Gemworld: Level 2: Village of the Frogs"	January 12, 2013
Dark Opal sends a giant spider that battles Amethyst.
78	"Amethyst, Princess of Gemworld: Level 3: Random Encounter"	January 19, 2013
Amethyst must take a dip in a lake after an encounter with a slime, but must also battle the enormous centipede-like creature that takes residence in the lake.
79	"Farm League #1: The Boiled Wonder/When the League's Away"	January 26, 2013
"The Boiled Wonder": Supermanatee and the Flish must save Robin's Egg from Lex Liger. "When the League's Away": Shazham protects the Barn of Justice from Duckseid.
80	"Character Profile: Impulse"	February 2, 2013
The origin story of Impulse is revealed.
81	"Thunder and Lightning #2: Lightning Under the Weather"	February 2, 2013
While Black Lightning battles the Masters of Disaster and Volcano Man, Thunder has to get herself and Lightning ready for school, but Lightning is under the weather. This turns out to be true to Black Lightning when her sneeze defeats one of the villains that Black Lightning was fighting.
82	"Amethyst, Princess of Gemworld: Level 4: The Turquoise Cave"	February 9, 2013
Amethyst battles Prince Topaz (who had been turned into a skeleton by Dark Opal in the first short) and earns his treasure after defeating him. Nothing left to hold him back, Amethyst puts Prince Topaz's skeleton back together and urges Prince Topaz to travel the world.
83	"Character Profile: Beast Boy"	February 16, 2013
The origin story of Beast Boy is revealed.
84	"Amethyst, Princess of Gemworld: Level 5: Battle in the Stormy Peaks"	February 16, 2013
Amethyst saves the Frog Prince from Dark Opal's spell and obtains her pendant's jewel Prince Topaz told her she needed. She must face Dark Opal himself when he shows up in person.
85	"Farm League #2: Snack Run"	February 23, 2013
Batmongoose is sent out to get snacks only to discover the Croaker, Cat Cat, and Moo-Face drugging the League's water trough.
86	"Amethyst, Princess of Gemworld: Level 6: The Final Battle"	March 2, 2013
Amethyst faces off against Dark Opal.
87	"Amethyst, Princess of Gemworld: Level 7: Welcome Home"	March 9, 2013
Amethyst defeats Dark Opal and returns to her own world.
88	"Farm League #3: Swimming Lessons/Talk to the Lamprey"	March 16, 2013
"Swimming Lessons": The Flish and Robin's Egg have their swim interrupted by Captain Cod. "Talk to the Lamprey": Sinestropotamus attacks the Barn of Justice capturing Cybug and Billy Bacon but is stopped by the Green Lamprey.
89	"Farm League #4: Taking Out the Trash"	April 27, 2013
Wonder Wombat and Cybug are fighting with Lex Liger.
90	"Shade #1: Shade, the Changing Man"	May 4, 2013
Shade, the Changing Man, combats madness late at night on a city street.
91	"Aquaman's Swimming Obstacle"	May 11, 2013
92	"DC's World's Funnest #6"	May 11, 2013
Superman sneezes and rains heat vision on the people of Gotham as the Joker tries to imitate a balloon and Catwoman describes what to do with a tail.
93	"Character Profile: Amethyst"	May 18, 2013
The origin story of Amethyst is revealed.
94	"DC Super Pets #1: Jokes on You"	May 18, 2013
Ace the Bat-Hound and Robin Robin must stop Joker Fish's villainous crime wave.
95	"Wonder Woman's Golden Lasso"	May 25, 2013
96	"Tales of Metropolis #1: Bizarro"	May 25, 2013
Bizarro tries to take the place of Clark Kent/Superman when Brainiac attacks Metropolis.
97	"Comic-Con 2013"	June 1, 2013
98	"Farm League #5: Heads or Tails"	June 1, 2013
In the super villain's silo, Craniac comes up with a brilliant plan, but Bizarrfo has a plan of his own.
99	"Penguin's Knock-Out Gas Umbrella"	June 8, 2013
Anthony De Longis demonstrates Penguin's umbrella including its knockout gas feature.
100	"DC's World's Funnest #7"	June 8, 2013
Superman describes what he's scared of, The Joker sings Jingle Bells as Batman appears, and Catwoman describes being good at balancing on one leg.
101	"Man of Steel Interview: Dylan Sprayberry #1"	June 15, 2013
Dylan Sprayberry is interviewed about playing a younger Clark Kent in Man of Steel.
102	"MAD Presents... Extreme Renovation: House Edition"	June 15, 2013
Ty Pennington and Lex Luthor do an extreme renovation on Superman's Fortress of Solitude.
103	"Man of Steel Interview: Dylan Sprayberry #2"	June 22, 2013
Dylan Sprayberry is interviewed about playing young Clark Kent in Man of Steel.
104	"DC Super Pets #2: Krypto vs. Streaky"	June 22, 2013
Krypto tries to compete against Streaky to see which could do the most good deeds in the shortest amount of time.
105	"Catwoman's Whip"	June 29, 2013
Mary De Longis demonstrates Catwoman's whip.
106	"Plastic Man in... The Bat and the Eel"	June 29, 2013
Batman relates his encounter with safecracker Eel O'Brian.
107	"Character Profile: Black Lightning"	July 6, 2013
The origin story of Black Lightning is revealed.
108	"Riddler #1: Riddle Me This!"	July 6, 2013
The Riddler places Batman in various death traps while asking him juvenile riddles involving members of the Justice League.
109	"Aquaman's Trident"	July 13, 2013
A man demonstrates Aquaman's underwater movements as he works to get the trident, swim around obstacles, and take down an underwater cut-out of Black Manta.
110	"Wonder Woman #1"	July 13, 2013
Steve Trevor crash lands on an island paradise and is pursued by two women in weaponized jeeps before Wonder Woman captures him using a stylized car that turns invisible.
111	"Wonder Woman #2"	July 20, 2013
As the two women confront Wonder Woman about interrogating Steve Trevor, Giganta awakes and emerges from the water taking the jeeps as roller skates. Wonder Woman, Steve Trevor, and the two women pack into the stylized car as they try to evade the giant.
112	"Teen Titans Go! Cast"	July 27, 2013
The cast of Teen Titans Go! is interviewed by their oversized blow-ups at the 2013 San Diego Comic-Con.
113	"Wonder Woman #3"	July 27, 2013
Wonder Woman defeats Giganta by sending her crashing into the ocean and saves Steve Trevor. Trevor asks where he is, but is not surprised when Wonder Woman replies "Paradise Island".
114	"Comic-Con 2013: Costumes"	August 3, 2013
115	"Tales of Metropolis #2: Lois Lane"	August 3, 2013
Lois Lane follows Batman everywhere to get an interview. Before he defeats Penguin, Batman answers Lois' questions in order of when each one is asked.
116	"Metal Men #1: Meet the Metal Men"	August 10, 2013
Will Magnus constructs the Metal Men.
117	"Penguin's Umbrella Gun"	August 17, 2013
Anthony De Longis demonstrates Penguin's Umbrella Gun by shooting paintballs at paper lanterns.
118	"DC Super Pets #3: World's Finest Bark"	August 17, 2013
Ace and Krypto team with Green Lantern B'dg.
119	"Doom Patrol: Chapter #1 - Challenge of the Timeless Commander"	August 24, 2013
The Doom Patrol protect an alien vessel from getting into the hands of General Immortus.
120	"Comic-Con 2013: Raven & Beast Boy"	August 31, 2013
121	"Metal Men #2: Three Laws of Robotics"	August 31, 2013
Will Magnus tries to teach the Metal Men the Three Laws of Robotics.
122	"Character Profile: Bizarro"	September 7, 2013
The origin story of Bizarro is revealed.
123	"Plastic Man in... Superheroes Wear Pajamas"	September 7, 2013
Plastic Man is entranced by the Tuxedo and appears in public in his Batman pajamas with his teddy bear.
124	"Catwoman's Whip #2"	September 14, 2013
Mary De Longis demonstrates Catwoman's whip on her husband who is wielding a baseball bat.
125	"DC's World's Funnest #8"	September 14, 2013
Batman misses a call on the Batphone because he was in the bathroom.
126	"Superman's Heat Vision"	September 21, 2013
127	"DC Super Pets #4: The League of Just Us Cows"	September 21, 2013
128	"Comic-Con 2013: Superman's Powers"	September 28, 2013
Con-goers were asked what they would do with Superman's powers.
129	"Deadman #1: Catch"	September 28, 2013
Deadman possesses various bodies in order to save a falling crow that he has tried to scare.
130	"Superman 75th Anniversary Party"	October 5, 2013
Celebrities at the Superman 75th Anniversary Party are asked what would they do with Superman's powers.
131	"Metal Men #3: Identity Crisis"	October 5, 2013
The Metal Men must face a threat despite their heads switched between each other's bodies.
132	"Interview: Dylan Sprayberry"	October 5, 2013
Dylan Sprayberry is interviewed about playing a younger Clark Kent in Man of Steel.
133	"Cyborg's Arm Cannon"	October 12, 2013
134	"MAD Presents... Zeke and Lex Luthor"	October 12, 2013
Zeke and Luther is parodied when Lex Luthor abducts and replaces Luther in a skateboarding competition.
135	"Character Profile: Metamorpho"	October 19, 2013
The origin story of Metamorpho is revealed.
136	"Superman 75th Anniversary"	October 19, 2013
Zack Snyder and Bruce Timm produced tribute to 75 years of Superman.
137	"Katana's Sword"	October 26, 2013
Katana's katana is demonstrated.
138	"Tales of Metropolis #3: Jimmy Olsen"	October 26, 2013
Jimmy Olsen goes over the problems with being Superman's best (and perhaps only) friend to Clark Kent.
139	"Deadman #2: Graveffiti"	November 2, 2013
140	"Plastic Man in... Untouchable"	November 9, 2013
141	"Character Profile: Shazam!"	November 17, 2013
The origin story of Captain Marvel is revealed.
142	"Doom Patrol: Chapter #2 - Trail of the Terrible Titan"	November 17, 2013
143	"Robin's Staff"	November 23, 2013
144	"Metal Men #4: Cash for Gold"	November 23, 2013
Also known as "Metal Men #4: Payback Time"
145	"Deadman #3: Date"	November 30, 2013
146	"DC's World's Funnest #9"	December 7, 2013
147	"Doom Patrol: Chapter #3 - The Spy Within the Doom Patrol"	December 28, 2013
148	"Character Profile: Wonder Woman"	February 22, 2014
The origin story of Wonder Woman is revealed.
149	"Batman: Strange Days (Batman 75th Anniversary)"	April 9, 2014
A lost tale from Batman's past, the Dark Knight tracks a strange giant to the mysterious lair of Hugo Strange.
150	"Green Arrow #1: Onomatopoeiabot"	April 16, 2014
Green Arrow and Black Canary have a competition to see who can destroy more of Onomatopoeia's giant robots.
151	"Batman Beyond (Batman 75th Anniversary)"	April 23, 2014
Terry (Batman) battles a Batman robot in the Batcave with help from Bruce and the Batmobile.
152	"Shazam! #1: Courage"	April 30, 2014
Billy Batson transforms into Shazam in order to see an R-rated, scary movie, but his fear leaves him too weak to fight when he encounters Ibac on the way home.
153	"DC Super Pets #5: Have Your Cake and B'Dg Too"	May 14, 2014
154	"Creature Commandos #1: Trailer"	July 5, 2014
155	"Green Arrow #2: Brick"	July 6, 2014
Green Arrow tests out a bunch of new arrows on Brick, to Black Canary's dismay.
156	"Shazam! #2: Wisdom"	July 12, 2014
Billy seeks the gods' help in answering a math problem involving trains.
157	"Metal Men #5: Metal Men vs. Chemo"	July 13, 2014
158	"Creature Commandos #2: Lucky Day"	July 19, 2014
159	"Green Arrow #3: Cupid"	July 20, 2014
Green Arrow's Bow falls in love with Cupid's crossbow.
160	"Shazam! #3: Stamina"	July 26, 2014
161	"DC's World's Funnest #10"	July 27, 2014
162	"Creature Commandos #3: Weak Link"	August 2, 2014

== DC Nation Super Spectacular ==
In May 2012, DC Comics released a 64-page monthly magazine called DC Nation Super Spectacular. The featured strips are based on the Young Justice & Green Lantern: The Animated Series television series as well as additional content such as behind the scenes features.

== Latin America ==
The DC Nation Shorts have been aired by Cartoon Network (Latin America) since July 2013. The shorts broadcast are Tokyo/Baby Superman, Amethyst Princess of Gemworld, DC Super Pets, Animal Man, Vibe, and The New Teen Titans.
