= Captain Cold =

DC comics supervillain

- Captain Cold as depicted in The Flash vol. 2 #182 (March 2002). Art by Brian Bolland.

Publication information
- Publisher: DC Comics
- First appearance: Showcase #8 (June 1957)
- Created by: John Broome; Carmine Infantino

In-story information
- Alter ego: Leonard "Len" Snart
- Species: Human
- Team affiliations: Legion of Doom; Secret Society of Super Villains; Injustice League; Rogues; Suicide Squad; Justice League; Freedom Fighters; Legends; Legion of Zoom
- Notable aliases: The Man Who Mastered Absolute Zero; Leonard Wynters; Blue Iceman; Citizen Cold; Freezy C
- Abilities: Genius-level intellect; Peak physical condition; Use of cryonic equipment; Expert tactician and thief; Skilled marksman; Expert combatant

Captain Cold (Leonard Snart) is a supervillain appearing in American comic books published by DC Comics. Created by John Broome and Carmine Infantino, the character first appeared in Showcase #8 (June 1957).

In his comic book appearances, Captain Cold is depicted as an adversary of various superheroes known as the Flash, most notably Barry Allen, and serves as the leader of the Rogues, a loose criminal association. In The New 52 continuity reboot, Captain Cold and his team live by a code that forbids killing.

The character has been substantially adapted from the comics into various forms of media, including television series and video games. Actor Wentworth Miller portrayed Captain Cold in The CW's Arrowverse television series The Flash and Legends of Tomorrow. In 2009, Captain Cold was ranked as IGN’s 27th Greatest Comic Book Villain of All Time.

== Fictional character biography ==
Leonard Snart was raised by an abusive father and took refuge with his grandfather, who worked in an ice truck. When his grandfather died, Snart grew tired of his father's abuse and set out to start a criminal career. Snart joined up with a group of small-time thieves and in planning out a robbery, each was issued a gun and a visor to protect their eyes against the flashes of gunfire. This visor design would later be adapted by Snart into his trademark costume. Snart later incorporates a radio receiver into his visor, which picks up the police band to monitor local law enforcement. Snart and the other thugs were captured by the Flash and imprisoned. Snart decided to go solo, but knew he had to do something about the local hero, the Flash.

Snart read an article that theorized that the energy emissions of a cyclotron could interfere with the Flash's speed. He designed a weapon to harness that power and broke into a cyclotron lab, intending to use the device to charge up his experimental gun. As he was finishing his experiment, a security guard surprised Snart. Intending to use his gun only to scare the guard, he inadvertently pulled the trigger and discovered that his weapon had been altered in a way he had never imagined. The moisture in the air around the guard froze. Intrigued by this twist of fate, Snart donned a parka and the aforementioned visor and declared himself to be Captain Cold - the man who mastered absolute zero.

Snart then committed a series of non-lethal crimes, on one occasion placing the city in suspended animation in an attempt to force Iris West to marry him as he had fallen in love with her when he saw her in the prison, but the Flash got through a wall of ice and was able to reverse the process. He later fell in love with a newscaster, and competed with Heat Wave over her in a crime spree, but they were both beaten by the Flash. But after Barry Allen's death, during the Crisis on Infinite Earths, Captain Cold became a bounty hunter with his sister Lisa, the Golden Glider.

During the events of Underworld Unleashed, Captain Cold lost his soul to Neron before Wally West brought it back to the land of the living. He soon returned to crime, this time a member of Wally's Rogues Gallery. The Rogues had first been assembled when fellow Flash foe Gorilla Grodd broke out of jail to distract the Flash. The Golden Glider had abandoned her bounty hunter career and had started partnering with a series of thugs who she dressed in a costume, armed with a copy of Captain Cold's signature Cold Gun, and called Chillblaine. Already distraught over the death of her lover, the Top, it seemed that the supposed death of her brother pushed her over the edge. But the last Chillblaine was a little smarter and more vicious. He murdered the Golden Glider, prompting Captain Cold to hunt him down, torture him and kill him by freezing his outer layer of skin and then pushing him off a high rise building. Not long after that, Snart was framed by a new incarnation of Mister Element. He used his Element Gun to simulate Cold's gun, using ice and cold to murder several police officers before Captain Cold and the Flash discovered who was actually responsible. With the death of his sister, and having killed Chillblaine and Mr. Element in vengeance, Cold has again become an unrepentant criminal. However, he worked with Wally West to defeat Brother Grimm after the latter betrayed him.

Captain Cold was declared the leader of the Flash's Rogues Gallery. His skill and experience have made him a strong leader to the likes of the Weather Wizard, the new Trickster, the new Mirror Master, and the new Captain Boomerang. Len seems to have taken the young Captain Boomerang under his wing, after the elder Boomerang was killed. Tabloids rumored that Captain Cold's sister, the Golden Glider, was Boomerang's mother, making him Captain Cold's nephew. This turned out to be false, however, as the new Boomerang's mother has been revealed to be Meloni Thawne, who is also the mother of Bart Allen.

Traditionally, Captain Cold is driven by three things: money, women, and the desire to beat Barry Allen. Although not the lecher that Captain Boomerang was, Len Snart has an eye for the ladies, particularly models. When Barry Allen died, Captain Cold drifted for a while, jumping back and forth over the lines of crime and justice. He was captured by the Manhunter and served time in the Suicide Squad, worked with his sister as a bounty hunter (Golden Snowball Recoveries), and, with his longtime friend and sometimes nemesis Heat Wave, encountered Fire and Ice of the Justice League. He has teamed up with various villains over the years other than the many Rogues. These include Catwoman and the Secret Society of Super Villains.

=== "One Year Later" ===
In the 2006 One Year Later storyline, he and several other Rogues are approached by Inertia with a plan to kill the Flash (Bart Allen). Though Inertia was defeated, Captain Cold, Weather Wizard, Heat Wave, Mirror Master and Abra Kadabra killed Bart with a combined barrage of their elemental weapons. He, Heat Wave, and Weather Wizard seemed to express guilt, however, after learning the identity of the Flash and how young he was.

=== Salvation Run ===
Captain Cold is one of the exiled villains featured in the 2007-08 miniseries Salvation Run along with his fellow Rogues: Heat Wave, Weather Wizard, Mirror Master, and Abra Kadabra.

=== Final Crisis: Rogues' Revenge ===
In the 2008 miniseries Final Crisis: Rogues' Revenge, Captain Cold and the Rogues briefly joined Libra's Secret Society of Super Villains. However, Cold and the rest of the Rogues reject Libra's offer, wanting to stay out of the game. Before they can retire, they hear of Inertia escaping and decide to stick around long enough to get revenge for being used. Cold and his group are challenged by a new set of Rogues, formed by Libra to be their replacements. The new group, having kidnapped Cold's father, challenge the Rogues, and are defeated and killed. Cold goes to his father, talking to him about the abuse he suffered, and the fate of his sister. After the elder Snart insults him and his mother, calling them weak, Cold punches him, but finds himself unable to kill him, instead getting Heat Wave to do it. The Rogues have their confrontation with Inertia, despite interference by Zoom and Libra, and kill Inertia. Libra then reveals that he needs the Rogues because Barry Allen has returned from the dead, and the Flashes are potential threats to him and Darkseid. Though shocked by the news that Allen is alive, Cold still rejects his offer of membership. After regrouping, Cold and the other Rogues agree not to retire, claiming that the game is back on. In Final Crisis #7, someone that looks like Captain Cold appears as a Justifier and is seen fighting the Female Furies alongside the other Justifiers under Lex Luthor's control.

=== The Flash: Rebirth ===
In the 2009 The Flash: Rebirth miniseries, Captain Cold is seen with the other Rogues, reading about Barry Allen's return and claiming that they would need more of the Rogues. The Rogues are still debating Allen's return, with Cold saying it is time to pull out a contingency plan that Mirror Master created, stating "In case The Flash returns, break glass."

=== "Blackest Night" ===
In the 2009–2010 Blackest Night storyline, the Rogues realize that the bodies of various dead Rogues are missing and prepare to fight them. Captain Cold knows that his sister, the Golden Glider, is among the reanimated Black Lanterns but is still ready to lead the Rogues against the zombies. He is confronted by the Black Lantern Glider, who attempts to use his feelings of love for her against him. However, Captain Cold manages to suppress these feelings long enough for him to fight back, freezing her within a block of ice. He subsequently kills Owen Mercer by throwing him into a pit with his Black Lantern father when he learns that Owen has been feeding people to his father in the belief that consuming flesh will restore him to life, informing Owen that Rogues do not kill women and children.

=== The Flash (Vol. 3) ===
In The Flash vol. 3, Captain Cold and the Rogues visit Sam Scudder's old hideout and unveil a giant mirror with the words In Case of Flash: Break Glass written on it and release beings from a Mirror World upon breaking it. However, Captain Cold is told by Mirror Master he had discovered that the giant mirror is actually a slow acting poison.

=== The Flash (Vol. 5) ===
In The Flash vol. 5, Captain Cold and his Cold Gun has allowed him to gain the power of weather manipulation. Snart's control over temperature allowed him to create a massive snowstorm over Central City.

=== The New 52 ===
In the timeline of the 2011 company-wide reboot of all its superhero titles, The New 52, Captain Cold is reintroduced as a younger man than in the previous timeline and now with his Rogues lives with a code never to kill. His origin remains the same, however, his sister Lisa has not been the Golden Glider, and is instead dying from cancer. Upon learning that the hospital does not have enough energy to power a laser that could save her life, because of an EMP seemingly caused by the Flash, Cold blames him for everything that has happened to him, including a falling out with the Rogues, and decides to break the rules of their "game" and kill the Flash. Captain Cold has undergone experiments that have given him ice-based metahuman powers, including the ability to slow down the molecules around him, creating a field of inertia that reduces the Flash's speed to human level, allowing Captain Cold to touch him and effortlessly beat him. He and the Rogues are set to return, but later defeated them with help from Flash, and the Pied Piper.

After freeing the Trickster and attending the meeting at the Justice League Watchtower, the Rogues return to Central and Keystone City, only to see that both have been destroyed by Gorilla Grodd. Grodd returns to Central City during the eclipse, while a ceremony commemorating Flash between the humans and gorillas is occurring. Grodd proceeds to take control of Central City as its king and renames it Gorilla City. Captain Cold sees the city's cops tied up from Grodd, and proceeds to free them. He then asks Mirror Master to help him get to the hospital where his sister is being held to check on her. While there, the Crime Syndicate send Black Bison, Hyena, Multiplex, Plastique, and Typhoon to finish Grodd's work and destroy the hospital. The Rogues are able to hold them off, only to be interrupted by Deathstorm and Power Ring, who were sent by Ultraman to deal with the Rogues for resisting the Crime Syndicate's offer to join them. After battling Deathstorm and Power Ring, Deathstorm attacks Captain Cold and is able to extract his freezing powers from his DNA. Mirror Master attempts to get the Rogues out through the Mirror World, but Power Ring destroys the mirror causing the Rogues to be separated. Captain Cold ends up at Luthor and his Kryptonian clone's location where they are also joined by Black Manta, who has retrieved Black Adam from the ocean. Luthor realizes that, with the help of his clone, Adam, Black Manta, and Captain Cold, he may be able to stop the Crime Syndicate. Captain Cold and the rest of the squad, now joined by Batman, Catwoman, Sinestro, and Deathstroke, infiltrate the fallen Watchtower, where Black Manta kills the Outsider and Cold proceeds to shatter Johnny Quick's right leg after having frozen it with his cold gun. He then unmasks the hooded prisoner brought over from Earth-3, revealing it to be Alexander Luthor, who is their version of Shazam, Mazahs, who states he will kill them all. After defeating the crime syndicate, Captain Cold is pardoned by the U.S. government, and becomes a member of the Justice League, along with Luthor.

=== DC Rebirth ===
Leonard Snart and the Rogues first made a cameo appearance in the DC Rebirth storylines; they are fleetingly watching a news report about the many newly created speedsters appearing throughout the city in The Flash vol. 5 #3. Snart quips that it is time for the Rogues to leave Central City for a while. Visually the Rogues still seem to be based upon their New 52 appearances in this cameo, though when Snart later appears in one of Flash's memory flashbacks he has resorted to an even older look. He and the other Rogues retain these costumes in their later appearances.

Snart and the Rogues make their first full-length appearance in The Flash vol. 5 #15, where they are attempting to steal a valuable golden statue of the god Mercury from Corto Maltese. The Flash arrives to stop them, but they turn out to be constructs of Mirror Master laid so that the Rogues can commit a crime spree in Central City. Captain Cold reveals what he had been working on in his absence from the city—a "black ice gun" that uses the anti-Speed Force weaponry of the terrorist group Black Hole combined with his regular freeze gun. After a fight, the Golden Glider had a chance to kill the Flash, but was talked out of it by her fellow Rogues. Despite this setback, Flash manages to finally beat Snart and the rest of the Rogues without killing them. By the end of The Flash vol. 5 #17, Snart appears to be ready to take over Iron Heights from the more neophyte villains, including Papercut.

== Powers and abilities ==
Like the majority of the Flash's Rogues, Snart had no innate superhuman powers (although he does have basic hand-to-hand combat training). He instead relied on his cold guns and instincts. Over the years, Snart had modified his weapons to allow a variety of effects such as:

- A cold beam that freezes anything it hits instantly.
- Creating a cold field where people and objects literally stop in their tracks. Cold uses this ability to slow down the Flash's movements.
- Bathing his opponent in a wide beam of ice designed to freeze the skin of the target so they stay conscious and do not go numb to the pain. Cold used this to kill Chillblaine who murdered Cold's sister to make him suffer as much as possible.
- Creating a slippery field of ice which can slow down the Flash.
- Forming sharp stalagmites on the ground to impale his enemies. Used to kill Chillblaine after freezing the outer layer of his skin so he could inflict as much pain as possible.
- An "ice grenade" which was stated to "turn this place into an iceberg". Used to freeze everything in a large radius, and the whole of Iron Heights during the events of Blackest Night.
- Creating "mirages" out of extreme cold-like heat.

Fellow ice-based villain Mr. Freeze has noted that Cold is the only cold-themed villain in the DC Universe to have mastered "absolute zero" with his weapons.

In the New 52 universe, Captain Cold temporarily had ice powers, including the power to slow down the Flash or objects traveling at high velocities via molecular deceleration caused by Absolute Zero, but these powers are later lost in the Forever Evil series when he is attacked by Deathstorm, with Cold reverting to using his classic ice gun. Despite his lack of professional or technical expertise, Cold states that he spent so long analyzing the parts of his cold gun that he is able to recreate it in just over half an hour using parts stolen from a standard electronics shop. He's even skilled enough to program it for a host of unique effects simulating some of his powers; like his "Cold Field" which quick cools the atmosphere to the point that everything caught in it grinds to a halt, or an auto activation function which triggers his Cold Gun's freeze ray via vocalized password input.

During the Rebirth storyline, Snart augmented his Cold Gun even further by combining it with the anti-Speed Force technologies by the science criminal cell called Black Hole. The newly christened Black Ice Gun now tacked directly into the Speed Force to painfully disrupt a speedster's connection to it. Snart's new cold gun was so powerful that not only could it hinder the Flash in the most excruciating way possible, it was vastly more powerful in scope, able to freeze both the harbor and several city blocks adjacent to their current location.

== Other versions ==
- An alternate universe version of Captain Cold appears in DC: The New Frontier.
- An alternate timeline version of Leonard Snart, Citizen Cold, appears in Flashpoint.
- An alternate universe version of Leonard Snart from Earth-3 appears in "Forever Evil". This version is an honest police officer partnered with Mick Rory.
- Captain Cold makes a cameo appearance in JLA/Avengers #4.
- Commander Cold, a character based on Captain Cold, appears in The Flash (vol. 3) as the leader of the Renegades.
- Chill, a character based on Captain Cold, appears in "Gotham Underground" and Final Crisis: Rogues' Revenge as a member of the Penguin's New Rogues.
- An alternate timeline version of Leonard Snart / Captain Cold appears in Absolute Flash. This version is the leader of the Rogues, a group of former US Army soldiers who were dishonorably discharged after taking bribes from a foreign government, who wields an experimental freeze gun created by Project Olympus.
- Captain Cold appears in DC x Sonic the Hedgehog: Metal Legion, where he is a member of the Legion of Doom.

== In other media ==
=== Television ===
==== Live-action ====
- An original incarnation of Captain Cold appears in a self-titled episode of The Flash (1990), portrayed by Michael Champion. This version is Leonard Wynters, an infamous albino hitman who wields a nuclear-powered freeze weapon.
- Captain Cold makes a cameo appearance in the Smallville episode "Prophecy" as a member of Toyman's Marionette Ventures.
- Leonard Snart / Captain Cold appears in media set in the Arrowverse, portrayed by Wentworth Miller. This version is a criminal mastermind.
  - Leonard first appears as a recurring character in The Flash (2014). He initially engages in normal thefts, coming into conflict with the Flash along the way, before obtaining a "cold gun" created by Cisco Ramon capable of freezing anything to absolute zero and subduing speedsters from a black market arms dealer. After being dubbed "Captain Cold" and several defeats at the Flash's hands, Leonard joins forces with his former partner Mick Rory and his sister Lisa Snart, both of whom also receive their own guns, and form the Rogues to battle the Flash and his allies across the first and second seasons before Leonard and Rory join the Legends (see below). Additionally, a past version of Leonard appears in the third season episode "Infantino Street".
  - Leonard appears as a main character in Legends of Tomorrow. In the first season, he and Rory, among others, are recruited by Rip Hunter to form the time-travelling Legends and prevent Vandal Savage from conquering the world. The pair agree so they can steal valuables from across time. Following failed attempts to fix his past, Leonard works to reform himself, in the process developing a budding romance with teammate Sara Lance. Near the end of the season, Leonard sacrifices himself to kill the Time Masters and save the Legends. In the second season, Eobard Thawne recruits a past version of Leonard into the Legion of Doom in exchange for preventing his death. However, the Legends eventually defeat the Legion, return Leonard to the point where Thawne retrieved him from, and erase his memories. Additionally, Leonard makes a minor appearance in the series' 100th episode "wvrdr error 100 oest-of-th3-gs.gid30n not found".
  - An alternate universe version of Leonard named Leo Snart appears in the crossover event "Crisis on Earth-X". This version hails from the titular "Earth-X", a reality where the Nazis won World War II. Working for a resistance movement alongside his boyfriend, later husband, Ray Terrill, Leo joins forces with heroes from Earth-1 to defeat Earth-X's army. Following this, Leo makes subsequent appearances in the third season of Legends of Tomorrow and The Flash episode "Fury Rogue".
  - An A.I. based on Leonard appears in the crossover event "Crisis on Infinite Earths".

==== Animation ====
- Captain Cold appears in Challenge of the Superfriends, voiced by Dick Ryal. This version has pale blue skin and is a member of Lex Luthor's Legion of Doom.
- Captain Cold appears in the Super Friends episode "Revenge of Doom", in which he reunites with the Legion of Doom.
- Captain Cold appears in the Justice League Unlimited episode "Flash and Substance", voiced by Lex Lang. This version is a member of the Rogues.
- Captain Cold appears in the Batman: The Brave and the Bold episode "Requiem for a Scarlet Speedster!", voiced by Steve Blum.
- Captain Cold appears in Young Justice, voiced by Alan Tudyk.
- Captain Cold appears in the "Animal Man" segment of DC Nation Shorts, voiced by Kevin Michael Richardson.
- Captain Cold appears in DC Super Friends, voiced by Gideon Emery.
- Captain Cold appears in the intro sequence of Justice League Action.
- Captain Cold appears in the Robot Chicken DC Comics Special and Robot Chicken DC Comics Special 2: Villains in Paradise, voiced by Kevin Shinick. This version is a member of the Legion of Doom.
- Captain Cold appears in Harley Quinn, voiced by Ben Levin. This version is a member of the Legion of Doom and the "cold boys".
  - Captain Cold appears in the Kite Man: Hell Yeah! episode "Portal Potty, Hell Yeah!", voiced by Vic Chao as an adult and Brycen Hall as a child.

=== Film ===
- The DC: The New Frontier incarnation of Captain Cold appears in Justice League: The New Frontier, voiced by James Arnold Taylor.
- Captain Cold appears in Superman/Batman: Public Enemies, voiced by an uncredited Michael Gough. This version is a member of the "Cold Warriors".
- Captain Cold appears in Justice League: The Flashpoint Paradox, voiced by Danny Jacobs. This version is a member of the Rogues. Additionally, Citizen Cold makes a non-speaking cameo appearance within the Flashpoint timeline.
- Captain Cold appears in JLA Adventures: Trapped in Time, voiced by Corey Burton. This version is a member of the Legion of Doom.
- Captain Cold appears in Lego DC Comics: Batman Be-Leaguered, voiced again by Kevin Michael Richardson.
- Captain Cold appears in Lego DC Comics Super Heroes: Justice League vs. Bizarro League, voiced again by Kevin Michael Richardson.
- Captain Cold appears in Lego DC Comics Super Heroes: Justice League: Attack of the Legion of Doom, voiced again by Kevin Michael Richardson. This version is a member of the Legion of Doom.
- Captain Cold appears in Lego DC Comics Super Heroes: The Flash, voiced again by Kevin Michael Richardson.

=== Video games ===
- Captain Cold appears in Batman: The Brave and the Bold – The Videogame, voiced again by Steve Blum.
- Captain Cold appears as a boss in DC Universe Online, voiced by Ryan Wickerham.
- Captain Cold appears as a playable character in DC Unchained.
- Captain Cold appears as a character summon in Scribblenauts Unmasked: A DC Comics Adventure.
- Captain Cold appears as a playable character in Injustice 2, voiced by C. Thomas Howell. This version is a member of Gorilla Grodd's Society.

==== Lego series ====
- Captain Cold appears in Lego Batman 2: DC Super Heroes, voiced again by Steve Blum.
- Captain Cold appears as a playable character in Lego Batman 3: Beyond Gotham, voiced by Robin Atkin Downes.
- Captain Cold appears in Lego DC Super-Villains, voiced again by Steve Blum. This version is a member of the Legion of Doom.

=== Miscellaneous ===
- Captain Cold appears in Justice League Adventures #12 as a member of the Cold Warriors.
- A teenage supervillain inspired by Captain Cold called Kid Kold appears in Teen Titans Go! #53.
- Captain Cold appears in DC Super Friends #16 as a member of the "Ice Pack".
- The Injustice incarnation of Captain Cold appears in the Injustice: Gods Among Us prequel comic as a former member of the Rogues who went into hiding.
- Captain Cold appears in Teen Titans Go! Party, Party!.
- Captain Cold appears in DC Super Hero Girls, voiced by Matthew Mercer. This version is a student at Super Hero High.
- The Injustice incarnation of Captain Cold appears in the Injustice 2 prequel comic as a member of Ra's al Ghul's Suicide Squad.

=== Merchandise ===
- Funko released a POP! vinyl figure of Captain Cold in their The Flash (2014) television series line. A variant of this figure, without the hood and goggles, was later released as an Entertainment Earth exclusive. along with a Captain Cold POP! pin.
- DC Collectibles released a figure of Captain Cold, based on his appearance in The Flash (2014).
- Lego released a minifig of Captain Cold in a two-pack with the Flash.

== See also ==
- List of Flash enemies
