= Monsieur Mallah =

Fictional character from DC Comics

- Monsieur Mallah with the Brain, from the cover to Outsiders (vol. 3) #37. Art by Daniel Acuña.

Publication information
- Publisher: DC Comics
- First appearance: Doom Patrol #86 (March 1964)
- Created by: Arnold Drake (writer); Bruno Premiani (artist)

In-story information
- Species: Meta-Gorilla
- Team affiliations: Brotherhood of Evil; Injustice League; Simian Scarlet
- Partnerships: The Brain
- Notable aliases: Abu Hallam
- Abilities: Superhuman strength, durability, speed, agility, reflexes, and intelligence; Enhanced sense of smell; Firearm mastery

Monsieur Mallah is a supervillain appearing in American comic books published by DC Comics. Created by Arnold Drake and Bruno Premiani, the character first appeared in Doom Patrol #86 (March 1964). He is the gorilla partner and servant of the disembodied supervillain Brain. The character serves as an enemy of the Doom Patrol, Justice League, and the Teen Titans.

Monsieur Mallah appears in the third season of the HBO Max series Doom Patrol, voiced by Jonathan Lipow.

== Fictional character biography ==
=== Origin ===
A scientist experimented on a captured gorilla from Gorilla City, raising his I.Q. to the genius-level of 178. He named the gorilla Monsieur Mallah and educated him for almost a decade before making him his personal assistant.

The scientist's colleague, Niles Caulder, grows jealous of his work and arranges for the scientist to get caught in an explosion, which destroys the scientist's body. Only the brain survives, and Caulder plans on putting his brain in a robot body. Mallah rescues the scientist, taking his brain and transferring it to a computer network that keeps it functioning. Now known simply as the Brain, the scientist and Mallah form the Brotherhood of Evil in hopes of conquering the world and getting revenge on Caulder.

Caulder, now known as the Chief, through a series of other accidents that he manipulated, forms the superhero group known as the Doom Patrol. Setting out to destroy the Chief's 'pets', the Brain, Mallah, and their Brotherhood become enemies with the Patrol. Their criminal activities also put them into opposition with the Teen Titans.

=== Doom Patrol ===
Art from Doom Patrol #34, by Richard Case.

During Grant Morrison's Doom Patrol run, Mallah has the Brain placed in one of Robotman's bodies. In his new body, the Brain confesses to Mallah that he is in love with him. Mallah reveals that he feels the same way, and the two kiss. However, they are both seemingly killed by a self-destruct mechanism inside Robotman's body. The two later resurface (the Brain back to floating in a jar), with no explanation of how they survived.

In the Salvation Run storyline, the Brain and Monsieur Mallah appear amongst the villains who were sent to the planet Cygnus 4019. The Brain and Mallah arrive at Joker's camp, and Mallah asks Gorilla Grodd to speak with him away from the others. Mallah proposes to Grodd that, as fellow gorillas and the natural kings of the jungle, they should team up and, through their combined might, rule the entire place by themselves. Grodd laughs at Mallah for considering himself, an "absurd science experiment", comparable to "a proud child of Gorilla City". Mallah strikes Grodd and calls him a beast, causing Grodd to fly into a rage and kill him and the Brain.

=== The New 52 ===
In September 2011, The New 52 rebooted DC's continuity. In this continuity, Mallah was a gorilla who was experimented on by a New England scientist named Ernst to increase his intellect. Ernst treated Mallah as a friend and an assistant. Following an explosion in his lab, Ernst was badly burned and Mallah saved his life by preserving his brain. After becoming distrustful of humans, Brain and Mallah attack humans who they blame for their plight.

In the Dawn of DC series Unstoppable Doom Patrol, Mallah betrays and kills Brain, believing that their relationship is toxic and no longer loving.

== Powers and abilities ==
Monsieur Mallah has superhuman strength, durability, speed, agility, reflexes, and intelligence, as well as a keen sense of smell. He usually carries a machine gun or any other firearms with him.

== In other media ==
=== Television ===
- Monsieur Mallah appears in Teen Titans, voiced by Glenn Shadix. This version is an arrogant member of the Brotherhood of Evil.
- Monsieur Mallah appears in Batman: The Brave and the Bold, voiced by Kevin Michael Richardson.
- Monsieur Mallah appears in Young Justice, voiced by Dee Bradley Baker. This version is a member of the Light in the first two seasons, during which he is eventually captured by the Team, and Task Force X in the third season.
- Monsieur Mallah appears in the "Doom Patrol" segment of DC Nation Shorts, voiced by David Kaye.
- Monsieur Mallah appears in Teen Titans Go!, voiced by Fred Tatasciore.
- Monsieur Mallah appears in Doom Patrol, voiced by Jonathan Lipow. This version is a member of the Brotherhood of Evil. After helping the Brain steal Robotman's body, Mallah leaves the former.
- Monsieur Mallah appears in My Adventures with Superman, voiced by André Sogliuzzo. This version is a kind-hearted gorilla and friend of Jimmy Olsen and Superman, and the husband of Brain.

=== Video games ===
- Monsieur Mallah appears in DC Universe Online, voiced by Leif Anders.
- Monsieur Mallah appears as a character summon in Scribblenauts Unmasked: A DC Comics Adventure.
- Monsieur Mallah appears as a playable character in Lego DC Super-Villains, voiced by Peter Jessop.

=== Miscellaneous ===
- Monsieur Mallah appears in Justice League Adventures #6.
- Monsieur Mallah appears in Justice League Unlimited #31.
- Monsieur Mallah appears in Smallville Season 11 #9.

== See also ==
- List of fictional primates
