= Phobia (comics) =

- Phobia as depicted in Blue Beetle (vol. 8) #3 (January 2012). Art by Ig Guara.

Publication information
- Publisher: DC Comics
- First appearance: New Teen Titans #14 (December 1981)
- Created by: Marv Wolfman; George Pérez

In-story information
- Alter ego: Angela Hawkins III
- Species: Metahuman
- Team affiliations: Brotherhood of Evil; Secret Society of Super Villains; Injustice League
- Abilities: Human psychic with an ability to control the fear centers of the human mind to create the person's greatest fears.; Illusion casting; Fear projection

Phobia (Angela Hawkins) is a supervillain appearing in American comic books published by DC Comics. Born a British aristocrat, Phobia possesses the power to create illusions representing the fears of others. She joins the Brotherhood of Evil, frequently opposing the Teen Titans.

== Publication history ==
Phobia first appeared in New Teen Titans #14 and was created by Marv Wolfman and George Pérez.

== Fictional character biography ==
Born a member of the British aristocracy with the power to make people experience their worst fears, Angela Hawkins III was a "bad seed" who rejected any help from her family. When the Brain comes to London to recruit her into the Brotherhood of Evil, Angela readily agrees. She joins the Brotherhood in the hopes of conquering her own fears by unleashing those of others.

Phobia travels to New Zealand. In the course of murderous crimes, Phobia coincidentally encounters the bestial super-hero Tasmanian Devil. Sensing her killings, Tasmanian Devil and his confidante Raylene Mackenzie tail her. Tasmanian Devil is initially immune to Phobia's powers because his bestial nature overrides her abilities. Phobia digs deeper into Tasmanian Devil's mind, uncovering his fear of his dominating and abusive mother. Despite this, Tasmanian Devil and Raylene manage to work together, subduing Phobia with a blow to the head. Tasmanian Devil becomes famous in New Zealand because of his efforts to protect Raylene.

Phobia later resurfaces with the Brotherhood of Evil, now called themselves the Society of Sin. She also accepts an invitation to join the Secret Society of Super Villains in Villains United. Phobia was seen as a member of the Injustice League.

In Infinite Crisis, Phobia is among the group of villains who destroy Blüdhaven. In Final Crisis, Phobia joins Cheetah's Secret Society of Super Villains. In The New 52, Phobia appears as one of several villains who seek to take Blue Beetle's scarab.

== Powers and abilities ==
Phobia is a metahuman with psychic powers that give her mastery over the human mind. She is able to probe into the psyches of her victims, discovering the things they most fear and then manifesting those fears in their minds with illusions.

== In other media ==
- Phobia makes non-speaking appearances in Teen Titans as a member of the Brotherhood of Evil.
- Phobia appears as a character summon in Scribblenauts Unmasked: A DC Comics Adventure.
- Phobia appears in Teen Titans Go! #55.
