= Plasmus =

- Plasmus as depicted in Who's Who in the DC Universe #18 (August 1986). Art by Marv Wolfman (penciller) and George Pérez (inker).

Publication information
- Publisher: DC Comics
- First appearance: The New Teen Titans #14 (December 1981)
- Created by: Marv Wolfman; George Pérez

In-story information
- Alter ego: Otto von Furth
- Species: Metahuman
- Team affiliations: Brotherhood of Evil; Suicide Squad; Secret Society of Super Villains
- Abilities: Superhuman strength, stamina, and durability; Regeneration; Fatal touch

Plasmus (/ˈplæzməs/; Otto von Furth) is a fictional character appearing in American comic books published by DC Comics. He is a German supervillain and an enemy of the Teen Titans who possesses a protoplasmic touch and was formerly a miner before General Zahl rescued him from a cave and later mutated him.

Dee Bradley Baker and Yuri Lowenthal respectively voice reimagined versions of Plasmus in Teen Titans and Young Justice. Both are depicted as more sympathetic than the comics version. In Teen Titans, the character is depicted as a human who uncontrollably transforms into Plasmus while awake, only reverting to his human form while asleep. In Young Justice, Plasmus is a child who was kidnapped and exploited for his abilities as part of a human trafficking operation.

== Publication history ==
Plasmus first appeared in The New Teen Titans #14 and was created by Marv Wolfman and George Pérez.

== Fictional character biography ==
Otto von Furth was a mine worker in East Berlin, Germany until an unexpected cave-in trapped him and four fellow miners for seven days. Von Furth's co-workers die, leaving him as the only survivor. After being rescued, Von Furth is hospitalized to be treated for radium poisoning. He is later kidnapped by ex-Nazi General Zahl, who transforms him into a metahuman with plasma-based abilities. Subsequently, he joins the Brotherhood of Evil under the name Plasmus. He and the Brotherhood of Evil fight the Teen Titans on different occasions. He enjoys these fights, but regrets not being able to kill Zahl.

The Brotherhood of Evil later reforms into the Society of Sin. During the "Our Worlds at War" event, Plasmus is recruited into Lex Luthor's Suicide Squad and apparently dies fighting Imperiex.

Plasmus accepts an invitation to join the Secret Society of Super Villains in the Countdown to Infinite Crisis series Villains United.

Plasmus is featured in Infinite Crisis as part of a small group of villains who bomb the city of Blüdhaven. The villain Chemo is dropped from an aircraft and detonates, killing hundreds of thousands of civilians.

During the One Year Later crossover, Plasmus rejoins the Brotherhood of Evil. He is also seen in Salvation Run. He is used by Lex Luthor as a power source for a teleportation device and is killed when the device self-destructs.

Plasmus is resurrected following The New 52, which rebooted the continuity of the DC universe. He appears as one of several villains who seek to take Blue Beetle's scarab for the Brotherhood of Evil.

== Powers and abilities ==
Plasmus' body is made of chemicals that dissolve whatever they touch, reducing objects and people to a protoplasmic state. He additionally possesses immense strength, stamina, and durability, as well as self-healing capabilities.

== Other versions ==
Plasmus appears in Tiny Titans.

== In other media ==
=== Television ===
- Plasmus appears in Teen Titans (2003), voiced by Dee Bradley Baker. This version uncontrollably transforms into a sludge monster while awake, only reverting to human form while unconscious. Additionally, he can detach varying quantities of himself which can act independently and often take on insectoid forms. Later in the series, Plasmus mutates further, gains the ability to generate acid, and joins the Brotherhood of Evil.
- Plasmus, based on the Teen Titans (2003) incarnation, appears in Teen Titans Go! (2013).
- Plasmus appears in Young Justice, voiced by Yuri Lowenthal. This version is a Markovian child who was kidnapped and had his metagene activated as part of a metahuman trafficking operation. While battling the Justice League, Plasmus is shot and killed by a farmer who believes him to be a monster.

=== Video games ===
- Plasmus appears in Teen Titans (2005), voiced again by Dee Bradley Baker.
- Plasmus appears as a character summon in Scribblenauts Unmasked: A DC Comics Adventure.

=== Miscellaneous ===
- Plasmus appears in Justice League Unlimited #31.
- Plasmus appears in Teen Titans Go! (2004).
