= Suicide Squad =

DC Comics antihero team

- Cover of Suicide Squad (vol. 5) #33 (March 2018). Art by Eddy Barrows, Eber Ferreira, Adriano Lucas, and Mason Fox.

Group publication information
- Publisher: DC Comics
- First appearance: Original: The Brave and the Bold #25 (September 1959); Modern: Legends #3 (January 1987)
- Created by: Original: Robert Kanigher; Ross Andru; Modern: John Ostrander

In-story information
- Base(s): Belle Reve Penitentiary, IMHS (Note: (Institute for Metahuman Studies))
- Member(s): List of Suicide Squad members

Suicide Squad
- : Cover of Suicide Squad #1 (May 1987). Art by Howard Chaykin.

Series publication information
- Publisher: DC Comics
- Schedule: Monthly
- Format: Ongoing series
- Genre: Spy, war, superhero
- Publication date: Vol. 1: May 1987 – June 1992; Vol. 2: November 2001 – October 2002; Vol. 3: November 2007 – June 2008; Vol. 4: November 2011 – July 2014; New Suicide Squad: September 2014 – July 2016; Vol. 5 August 2016 – January 2019; Vol. 6 December 2019 – November 2020; Vol. 7 March 2021 – present
- Number of issues: Vol. 1: 68 (#1–66 plus 1 Annual and 1 Special); Vol. 2: 12; Vol. 3: 8 Vol. 4: 32 (#1–30 plus issue #0 and one Special); New Suicide Squad: 22 (20 regular, 1 Annual and 1 Special); Vol. 5; 50 (plus a DC Rebirth one-shot); Vol. 6; 11

Creative team
- Writer(s): Vol. 1: John Ostrander (#1–67, Annual #1); Paul Kupperberg (Doom Patrol and Suicide Squad Special #1); Kim Yale (#23–24, 27–32, 34, 36–37, 39–43, 45–66); Robert Greenberger (#38); David M. DeVries (#44); Vol. 2: Keith Giffen (#1–12); Vol. 3: John Ostrander (#1–8); Vol. 4: Adam Glass (#1–19, 0); Ales Kot (#20–23); Matt Kindt (#24–29); Jim Zub (Suicide Squad: Amanda Waller #1); Sean Ryan (#30); New Suicide Squad: Sean Ryan (#1–22, Annual #1); Vol. 5: Rob Williams (#1– present); Vol. 6: Tom Taylor (#1– present)
- Penciller(s): Vol. 1: Luke McDonnell (#1–24, 35, 38, 38–39, 44, 46, 49–51, Annual #1); Grant Miehm (#25–26, 32, 50); John K. Snyder III (#27–31, 33–34, 36–37); Geof Isherwood (#40–43, 45, 47–48, 50, 53–66); Jim Fern (#52); M. Mondy (#53); Vol. 2: Paco Medina (#1–12); Vol. 3: Javier Pina (#1–8); Robin Riggs (#1–8); Jesus Saiz (#7); Vol. 4: Federico Dallocchio (#1–2, 4–5, 8); Ransom Getty (#1); Andrei Bressan (#2); Cliff Richards (#3, 13, 19); Clayton Henry (#6–7); Ig Guara (#7); Fernando Dagnino (#0, 9–10, 12, 14–15); Carlos Rodriguez (#11); Henrik Jonsson (#16–18); Patrick Zircher (#20–22, 24–26); Rick Leonardi (#23; Roger Robinson (#27); Rafa Sandoval (#27); Jason Masters (#28); Jim Fern (#29); André Coelho (#30); New Suicide Squad: Jeremy Roberts (#1, 3); Tom Derenick (#2–8); André Coelho (Futures End #1); Philippe Briones (#8–, Annual #1); Vol. 5: Jonathan Glapion, Philip Tan (Rebirth #1); Scott Williams, Jim Lee(#1–#8); Vol. 6: Bruno Redondo (#1–present)
- Inker(s): Vol. 1: Karl Kesel; Vol. 2: Joe Sanchez; Vol. 3: Robin Riggs; Vol. 4: Federico Dallocchio; Ransom Getty; Scott Hanna; Andrei Bressan; Cliff Richards; Clayton Henry; Fernando Dagnino; Carlos Rodriguez; Sandu Florea; Patrick Zircher; Andy Owens; Derek Fridolfs; Marc Deering; Jordi Tarragona; Wayne Faucher; New Suicide Squad: various
- Letterer(s): Vol. 1: Todd Klein; Vol. 2: Bill Oakley; Kurt Hathaway; Vol. 3: Rob Leigh; Vol. 4: Jared K. Fletcher; Carlos M. Mangual; New Suicide Squad: Taylor Esposito; Dave Sharpe
- Colorist(s): Vol. 1: Carl Gafford; Tom McCraw; Vol. 2: John Kalisz; Vol. 3: Jason Wright; Vol. 4: Val Staples; Allen Passalaqu; Matt Yackey; Pete Pantazis; Jason Keith; Brad Anderson; Matt Milla; Blond; Brett Smith; Andrew Dalhouse; New Suicide Squad: Blond
- Creator(s): Original: Robert Kanigher; Ross Andru; Modern: John Ostrander
- Editor(s): Vol. 1: Robert Greenberger; Dan Raspler; Mike Gold; Vol. 2: Peter Tomasi; Stephen Wacker; Vol. 3: Joan Hilty; Rachel Gluckstern; Vol. 4: Pat McCallum; Rachel Gluckstern; Sean Mackiewicz; Rickey Purdin; Mike Marts; Darren Shan; Brian Cunningham; Wil Moss; Harvey Richards; Kate Durréh; New Suicide Squad: Taylor Esposito; Dave Sharpe

Collected editions
- Trial by Fire: ISBN 1-4012-3005-9
- Suicide Squad: From the Ashes: ISBN 1-4012-1866-0
- Kicked in the Teeth: ISBN 1-4012-3544-1
- Basilisk Rising: ISBN 1-4012-3844-0
- Death Is for Suckers: ISBN 1-4012-4316-9
- Discipline and Punish: ISBN 1-4012-4701-6
- Walled In: ISBN 1-4012-5012-2
- New Suicide Squad: Vol. 1: ISBN 1-4012-5238-9

The Suicide Squad (also known as Task Force X) is a fictional black-ops unit appearing in American comic books published by DC Comics. While the original version debuted in The Brave and the Bold #25 (September 1959), the second and modern iteration, created by John Ostrander, debuted in Legends #3 (January 1987). Since the team's creation, various incarnations have existed and depicted in several self-titled comic book series and spin-offs.

The original version of the unit (Suicide Squadron) consisted of expendable members, who were soldiers with felonies, in service to the United States government, performing high-risk missions, and were led by Captain Rick Flag during World War II. Several decades later, the idea would resurface from Amanda Waller, a political operator who altered the idea to include known and lesser-known supervillains as expendable assets to allow the government plausible deniability and, in return, a reduced prison sentence. While primarily consisting of super-villains outfitted with explosives embedded into them to ensure compliance, the unit also features military field team leaders, administrative operatives that assist Waller, and non-coerced operatives. While the unit's roster is in constant flux due to the nature of the squad, recurring members include Captain Boomerang, Deadshot, El Diablo, Enchantress, Harley Quinn, and King Shark. Other reoccurring members includes non-coerced operatives Bronze Tiger, Katana, and Rick Flag.

The Suicide Squad has been adapted extensively in media. In animation, the team has appeared in Batman: Assault on Arkham, Justice League Unlimited, Suicide Squad: Hell to Pay, My Adventures with Superman, and others. The team has also been adapted in various live-action films of the DC Extended Universe and the video game Suicide Squad: Kill the Justice League.

== Background and creation ==
The original Suicide Squad appeared in six issues of The Brave and the Bold. Co-creator/writer Robert Kanigher took the name from another comic series of the same name, by an unknown writer, from the Australian comic publishing company Frew Publications. Although this early incarnation of the team (created by Kanigher and artist Ross Andru) did not have the antics of later iterations, it explained much of squad's field leader Rick Flag's personal history. The team's administrator Amanda Waller was introduced in the Legends miniseries, with the original Silver Age Squad's backstory elaborated in Secret Origins (vol. 2) #14.

The Suicide Squad was later re-established in the Legends miniseries with writer John Ostrander at the helm. The renewed concept involved the government employing a group of supervillains to perform extremely dangerous missions as deniable and expendable assets, a concept popular enough for an ongoing self-titled series. The squad was often paired with DC's other government agency, Checkmate, culminating in the Janus Directive crossover.

While the Squad is often depicted as succeeding on their missions, failure was an occurrence. Ostrander remarked on how stories sometimes purposefully brought in characters to be killed off. The team's very name, Suicide Squad, relates to the idea that this group of characters is sent on dangerous and difficult suicide missions.

Suicide Squad (vol. 1) lasted 66 issues, along with one Annual and one special (Doom Patrol and Suicide Squad Special #1). After the series' cancellation in 1992, the team members made several appearances in titles such as Superboy, Hawk & Dove, Chase, and The Adventures of Superman.

Suicide Squad (vol. 2) was published in 2001, written by Keith Giffen, with art by Paco Medina. Though the series' first issue featured a Squad composed entirely of Giffen's Injustice League members, the roster was promptly slaughtered, save for Major Disaster and Multi-Man. These developments prompt Sgt. Rock, who was written into the role of squad leader, to recruit new members of whom many die during missions.

Suicide Squad (vol. 3) (initially subtitled Raise the Flag in DC's solicitations) was an eight-issue miniseries published in 2007. It featured the return of writer John Ostrander with art by Javier Pina. The story focused on the return of Rick Flag Jr. and the formation of a new squad to attack a corporation responsible for developing a deadly bio-weapon.

Suicide Squad (vol. 4) debuted as part of DC Comics' line-wide New 52 continuity reboot in 2011. The relaunched book was written by Adam Glass, with art by Federico Dallocchio and Ransom Getty. Amanda Waller directs the group from behind the scenes; Deadshot, Harley Quinn, and King Shark feature prominently in this version of the Squad. The volume concluded in 2014, with issue #30.

New Suicide Squad was launched in July 2014. Written by Sean Ryan with art by Jeremy Roberts, the new series continues to feature Deadshot and Harley Quinn, with Deathstroke, Black Manta, and the Joker's Daughter also featuring.

Since 2014, the Suicide Squad has expanded beyond the comics. It received two major live-action films, including James Gunn's The Suicide Squad (2021), which introduced characters such as Peacemaker and Bloodsport to the team's roster. It also spawned the Peacemaker television series, the video game Suicide Squad: Kill the Justice League (2024), and several new comic incarnations, with Amanda Waller becoming increasingly central to major DC storylines.

== Publication history ==
=== Silver Age ===
The Squad debuted in The Brave and the Bold #25; art by Ross Andru.

==== Plot synopsis ====
===== The Brave and the Bold =====
The original Suicide Squad first appears in The Brave and the Bold #25. Team members appearing in the debut issue include physicist Jess Bright; astronomer Dr. Hugh Evans; Rick Flag Jr., the team leader; and Karin Grace (Davies in #26, Grace in #37), flight medic. The characters have follow-up appearances in issues #26, #27 and #37-#39. The team's introductory story depicts them being called in to deal with a super-heated red-hued object, called the "Red Wave", which was heading toward a seaside resort and boiling the ocean along the way. They travel in a plane equipped with a testing and analysis lab. Follow-up appearances show the team dealing with a variety of challenges: a meteor storm (the radiation from which causes them to shrink), a giant serpent in the Paris subway tunnels, a giant monster that captures Karin, and a nuclear bomb. Issues #38 and #39 show the team encountering dinosaurs and meeting the leader of the Cyclops.

===== Star Spangled War Stories =====
The Suicide Squad then continued in The War that Time Forgot, published in Star Spangled War Stories #110-111, #116-121, #125, and #127-128, that introduced the characters Morgan and Mace.

===== Legends =====
In the midst of Darkseid's attempt to turn humanity against Earth's superheroes via his minion Glorious Godfrey, Amanda Waller assigns Rick Flag Jr. leadership of a reformed Task Force X. Blockbuster, Bronze Tiger, Captain Boomerang, Deadshot, and Enchantress make up Task Force X at Belle Reve. The squad's first mission is to eliminate Darkseid's rampaging fire elemental Brimstone; Blockbuster dies during the conflict and Deadshot takes down the creature with an experimental laser rifle. Waller dismisses the group, though they soon reconvened to rescue Captain Boomerang after Godfrey captures him.

==== Secret Origins (vol. 2) ====
During World War II, a number of Army riffraff are assembled into a unit that is highly expendable, and therefore nicknamed the Suicide Squadron (shortened to Suicide Squad). Several such teams existed, but their history in comics is only scarcely recorded before Rick Flag Sr. becomes the leader of the team. After the war ends, the team (together with the Argent group) is put under the umbrella organization of Task Force X. After his father's death, Rick Flag Jr. goes on to lead the group that is featured in The Brave and the Bold. A deadly encounter with a Yeti during a mission in Cambodia ends with Evans and Bright dead and sends Flag back to the U.S. with a wounded Karin Grace. After a stint with the Forgotten Heroes, Flag is drafted into the Squad that Waller assembles in Legends.

==== Other World War II Suicide Squads ====
The World War II Squad of Secret Origins (vol. 2) #14 was a means of tying the Silver Age Suicide Squad to the war-era Suicide Squad (also called the Suicide Squadron) created by Robert Kanigher for his "The War that Time Forgot" tales in the pages of Star Spangled War Stories. This Suicide Squadron is described as a "top-secret Ranger outfit" whose members were trained to tackle missions from which ordinary volunteers were not expected to return alive.

Another classic version of the Squad (Rick Flag Jr., Karin Grace, Jess Bright, and Dr. Hugh Evans) appears in DC: The New Frontier. The group is briefly shown undertaking the sorts of dangerous missions the Squad is known for, and Flag eventually drafts Hal Jordan onto the team to assist in preparing a space flight to Mars. The experimental rocket's test runs quickly goes south and the group (sans Jordan) dies in the explosion.

In the DC Comics Bombshells continuity, the World War II-era Suicide Squad is led by Francine Charles and consists of Killer Croc, Enchantress, Rose Wilson, and Barbara Gordon (who in this setting is a vampire). In the final issue of the comic, it is revealed that after the end of the war, this Suicide Squad became a "Dark Justice League" that defends Earth from the world against magical threats.

=== Suicide Squad (vol. 1) ===
==== Background ====
The first volume of Suicide Squad, written by modern Squad creator John Ostrander, launched in May 1987, shortly after the team was introduced in the "Legends" crossover storyline. It lasted for 66 monthly issues, along with one annual and one special (Doom Patrol and Suicide Squad Special #1), both published in 1988.

This series details the covert operations of the modern post-Crisis Squad, created (in-universe) and directed by Amanda Waller. It is notable for bringing obscure characters such as Captain Boomerang and Deadshot to prominence; the latter received his own tie-in miniseries in 1988, co-written by Ostrander and Kim Yale. The Suicide Squad also presents a modern context for field team leader Rick Flag Jr.'s modern-day activities and his involvement in the Silver-Age Suicide Squad. Former Batgirl Barbara Gordon makes her first appearance as the information-broker Oracle, and serves as the Squad's remote radio support, a vocation she adopted after being shot by the Joker. She uses a wheelchair as a result of being shot.

Suicide Squad (vol. 1) takes pains to humanize its relatively obscure ensemble cast, partly via an in-house chaplain and psychiatric staff at the Squad's Belle Reve headquarters. These staff members are frequently seen interviewing various Squad operatives or providing evaluations of their mental states; several full issues are dedicated to examining prominent characters' personal lives and motivations.

==== Plot synopsis ====
Throughout 66 issues, this incarnation of the Suicide Squad undertook numerous high-risk missions for the U.S. government.

===== "Baptism of Fire" =====
The team's first mission in the Suicide Squad title set them up against their recurring enemies, Onslaught. They infiltrate their headquarters, the fortress Jotunheim, and kill most of Onslaught. Elements from this first story arc return over the series, such as the death of Mindboggler, Captain Boomerang's cowardly and treacherous nature, Nightshade's attraction to Rick Flag Jr., a rivalry between Rustam and Flag, and Ravan's defeat at the hands of Bronze Tiger.

===== "Mission to Moscow" =====
On orders of Derek Tolliver (the team's liaison with the UNSC), the Suicide Squad is sent to Moscow to free the captive Zoya Trigorin, a revolutionary writer. Although the mission is largely successful in its first half, the team finds that Trigorin does not want to be freed at all, causing friction among the team as they plan their escape.

In the end, the mission ends with the Squad having to travel across a tundra to reach safety, but come face to face with the People's Heroes, the Russian's own group of metahumans. In the conflict, Trigorin dies, and Nemesis (Tom Tresser) is captured. It turns out Tolliver never considered the possibility of Trigorin wishing to become a martyr, automatically leaping at the conclusion she would be eager to leave the Soviet Union, and thus risked Waller's wrath.

===== "Rogues" and "Final Round" =====
In this story arc, building on subplots from previous issues, Rick Flag attempts to assassinate Senator Cray. Previously, Cray had been blackmailing Amanda Waller to ensure Cray's reelection, threatening her with the exposure of the Suicide Squad to the public. Deadshot confronts Flag shortly before he can shoot Cray, but is unable to prevent Tolliver's murder. As a result of these developments, the Suicide Squad is exposed to the public, contrary to Flag's intentions.

Resulting from the exposure, Amanda Waller is replaced by an actor named Jack Kale so that she can continue to run the Squad. The team then goes on a public relations offensive, becoming, for a time, a prominent heroic team by saving a nun from a repressive regime. Rick Flag travels to Jotunheim, where Onslaught is still headquartered, and sacrifices himself to destroy the base.

===== "The Janus Directive" =====
"The Janus Directive" is a crossover storyline involving an interagency war between Checkmate, the Suicide Squad, and Project Atom, who are manipulated by Kobra to distract the United States intelligence community from his activities. During the crossover, the headquarters of Checkmate and the Suicide Squad are destroyed and all of the Force of July are killed except for Major Victory. In the end, with the defeat of Kobra, the various government agencies are made autonomous, to be overseen by Sarge Steel.

===== "Mystery of the Atom" =====
Batman is working to solve the murder of the Atom. He hears that Waller possibly knew about the explosion that killed him. Superman is told by a CBI agent that the Suicide Squad would be attempting to rescue Qurac's former President Hurrambi Marlo. Adam Cray confronts Deadshot about killing his father, Senator Cray. Hayoth member Golem enters the facility holding Marlo on Blood Island. Hayoth mistakenly believe they would be allowed to take Marlo into custody. This misunderstanding caused the Hayoth to become embroiled in a four-way conflict with the Justice League (Superman, Batman, and Aquaman), who were there searching for Ray Palmer (Atom), as well as the Suicide Squad, and Onslaught. After a series of skirmishes, Superman ends the battle.

The series concludes in issues #63 - 66, in which the Suicide Squad travels to Diabloverde to depose a seemingly invulnerable and invincible dictator calling himself Guedhe. This despot has his own personal bodyguards, who also call themselves the Suicide Squad. Insulted by the rival team usurping the Suicide Squad name, Waller accepts the mission to liberate Diabloverde at the price of one peso, paid by an exiled resident, Maria. After this mission, Waller disbands the Suicide Squad.

==== Membership: Amanda Waller's Squad ====
Notable team members from Suicide Squad (vol. 1) include:

- Amanda Waller
- Rick Flag Jr.
- Bronze Tiger
- Captain Boomerang (George "Digger" Harkness)
- Count Vertigo
- Deadshot
- Doctor Light (Arthur Light)
- Lashina
- Enchantress
- Jewelee
- Nemesis (Tom Tresser)
- Nightshade
- Oracle (Barbara Gordon)
- Poison Ivy
- Punch
- Ravan
- Shade, the Changing Man
- Thinker (Cliff Carmichael)
- Vixen

=== Interim stories (between Vol. 1–2) ===
The Squad resurfaces in a three-issue Superboy (vol. 3) arc, consisting of Captain Boomerang, Deadshot, King Shark, Knockout, Sam Makoa, and Sidearm (who meets his death in the following issue). Superboy joins the Squad to assist in taking out a Pacific Rim crime cartel called the Silicon Dragons.

In the Hawk & Dove (vol. 4) miniseries, Hawk and Dove are targeted by the government who assemble a new Suicide Squad to subdue the pair. Squad members at the time include Bronze Tiger, Count Vertigo, Deadshot, Flex, Quartzite, Shrapnel, and Thermal.

Amanda Waller reforms the Squad once again in Chase #2. D.E.O. agent Cameron Chase joins Bolt, Copperhead, Killer Frost, and Sledge on a mission to take out a South American military base, only to be betrayed by the villains.

Lex Luthor organizes another Suicide Squad during his term as President of the United States so that they can recruit Doomsday to battle the alien Imperiex. This version of the Squad consists of Chemo, Mongul, Plasmus, and Shrapnel; it is led by Manchester Black, under the supervision of Steel.

=== Suicide Squad (vol. 2) ===
Keith Giffen's short-lived Suicide Squad run (which began in November 2001 and lasted 12 issues) is something of a darkly humorous analog to the writer's former work on Justice League International, and follows a new version of the Squad, designated Task Force Omega, and run by Sgt. Frank Rock. Together with his right-hand man Bulldozer, Rock taps new characters Havana and Modern to round out the team's mobile HQ. President Lex Luthor and Secretary of Metahuman Affairs Amanda Waller are shown to be supplying the Squad's assignments.

Rock is thought by several other characters to have been deceased since the end of World War II, and they are surprised to see him alive and well. Two flashback stories provide some context for Rock's current-day activities, but the series' final issue strongly implies that Rock is an impostor.

==== Membership: Task Force Omega ====
Notable team members from Suicide Squad (vol. 2) include:

- Amanda Waller
- Sgt. Rock (implied to be an impostor)
- Big Sir
- Bulldozer
- Clock King (William Tockman)
- Cluemaster
- Deadshot
- Havana
- Killer Frost (Louise Lincoln)
- Major Disaster
- Modem
- Multi-Man

=== Interim stories (between Vol. 2–3) ===
Amanda Waller and the Suicide Squad were heavily involved in the events and fallout of 52. During much of this time, Waller ran the Squad covertly as the White Queen of Checkmate. This inter-faction tension is a recurring theme throughout many Squad stories of this era.

A Squad consisting of Deadshot, Killer Frost, and Solomon Grundy goes after Lois Lane to silence her investigation into Lex Luthor's presidency. Additionally, a mystery agent sends Captain Boomerang, Double Down, Killer Frost, and Killer Shark in an attempt to assassinate Amanda Waller as she awaits trial.

==== 52 ====
Amanda Waller assembles a short-lived Suicide Squad, led by Atom Smasher, to take on an out-of-control Black Adam. Atom Smasher's team ambushes the Black Marvel Family, getting Waller the evidence that she needs to expose their threat to the world. As Waller reviews future potential Squad members, Atom Smasher quits the team, threatening to inform Checkmate of Waller's unauthorized field ops unless she grants him a pardon. Later, as World War III rages, Waller informs Bronze Tiger that Rick Flag Jr. is alive.

==== Checkmate (vol. 2): "Rogue Squad" ====
As part of DC's One Year Later event, Greg Rucka penned the two-part "Rogue Squad" arc for Checkmate (vol. 2). After Bronze Tiger finds Rick Flag Jr. alive, Amanda Waller (now the White Queen of Checkmate) taps the pair to track down a rogue Squad that is out to expose her off-the-books activities. The Squad is led by Mirror Master, and includes Icicle, Javelin, Plastique, Tattooed Man, Punch, and Jewelee.

==== Salvation Run ====
Beginning in the pages of Countdown, the Squad makes various one-off appearances where they are seen rounding up the world's villains for an unknown purpose. This culminates in the seven-issue Salvation Run miniseries (written by Bill Willingham), where the Squad sends the apprehended villains to a remote prison world via a boom tube. Squad members seen rounding up villains include Rick Flag Jr., Bronze Tiger, Captain Boomerang, Count Vertigo, the General, King Faraday, Multiplex, Nightshade, Plastique, Bane, Chemo, and Deadshot. The latter three are betrayed by the Squad and sent to the prison planet with the other villains.

=== Suicide Squad (vol. 3) ===
==== Background ====
John Ostrander returned to the Suicide Squad for an eight-issue miniseries that began in November 2007. The series takes place between the squad's appearance in Checkmate (vol. 2) #6–7 and the events of Salvation Run. It is functionally a sequel to the Checkmate arc, detailing how Rick Flag Jr. survived his apparent death before returning to Waller's Suicide Squad.

DC Comics' official solicitations consistently referred to the miniseries as Suicide Squad: Raise the Flag, though this nomenclature is never used within any individual issue or collected edition of the miniseries.

==== Plot synopsis ====
After he is believed dead, Rick Flag Jr. resurfaces on Skartaris alongside his enemy Rustam. The pair works together to survive. Unfortunately, Flag is forced to kill Rustam once they discover a way home. Afterward, he becomes a prisoner of war in Qurac for four years. Flag rejoins the Suicide Squad after he is rescued by Bronze Tiger.

After reviewing several new recruits, Amanda Waller briefs the Squad on the latest target: a Dubai-based global conglomerate called Haake-Bruton, whose new viral weapon is to be destroyed, and its board of directors eliminated. The Squad airdrops onto Haake-Bruton's island stronghold, where Flag encounters Rustam's revenge-seeking father. Eiling compromises the mission, conspiring with Thinker to betray the Squad to Haake-Bruton's board in exchange for asylum. The Squad suffers heavy casualties in the sudden internal conflict. Despite numerous setbacks, Deadshot carries out the assassination, while Waller confronts the General personally. Eiling demonstrates control over Flag via psychological conditioning; Flag subdues him after revealing the cooperation as a ruse, and the Squad returns to Belle Reve. Flag is unfazed by Waller's revelation that his own identity and memories are implanted, asserting to Nightshade that he is still Rick Flag Jr.

==== Membership: Raise the Flag ====
Notable team members from Suicide Squad (vol. 3) include:

- Amanda Waller
- Rick Flag Jr.
- Blackguard
- Bronze Tiger
- Captain Boomerang (George "Digger" Harkness)
- Captain Boomerang (Owen Mercer)
- Chemo
- Count Vertigo
- Deadshot
- King Faraday
- The General
- Marauder
- Multiplex
- Nightshade
- Plastique
- Thinker (Cliff Carmichael)
- Twister
- White Dragon (William Heller)
- Windfall

=== Interim stories (between Vol. 3–4) ===
The Squad made prominent appearances in a four-issue Manhunter (vol. 4) arc and during the Blackest Night crossover event. In his multiverse-spanning adventures, Booster Gold briefly cooperated with a version of the Silver Age Squad. These issues mark the Squad's final appearances prior to DC Comics' New 52 continuity reboot in 2011.

=== Suicide Squad (vol. 4) ===
A new Suicide Squad title, written by Adam Glass with art by Federico Dallocchio and Ransom Getty, launched in September 2011 as part of The New 52 (a reboot of the DC Comics universe). Amanda Waller once again directs a crew of black ops agents on covert government missions, with Deadshot serving as the field team's leader. After a botched government mission forces her to execute an injured teammate, Amanda Waller sets out to assemble an expendable field team, prompting the formation of a new Suicide Squad. Waller forces dozens of Belle Reve's death row inmates into a series of rigorous tests and torture scenarios to evaluate their loyalty and value as potential Squad members. The finalists—including Deadshot, King Shark, and Harley Quinn—are outfitted with micro-bomb implants, and inducted into the Squad.

Eventually, Waller recruits serial killer James Gordon Jr. to act as Belle Reve's in-house psychiatric adviser—but unbeknownst to her, Gordon quickly develops a twisted infatuation with her. One ongoing and unresolved plot point involves the Samsara serum—a medical treatment that Belle Reve's doctors use to resurrect dead Squad members (including Deadshot and Voltaic). It is eventually discovered that the serum will permanently kill anyone to whom it is administered; Waller is implied to be one such subject.

==== Membership: Suicide Squad (vol. 4) ====
Notable team members from Suicide Squad (vol. 4) include:

- Amanda Waller
- Black Spider (Eric Needham)
- Cheetah
- Captain Boomerang (George "Digger" Harkness)
- Deadshot
- El Diablo (Chato Santana)
- James Gordon Jr.
- King Shark
- Light and Lime
- Harley Quinn
- Savant
- Unknown Soldier
- Voltaic
- Yo-Yo (Chang Jie-Ru)

=== New Suicide Squad ===
==== Background ====
This 2014 relaunch, from writer Sean Ryan and artist Jeremy Roberts, sees Deadshot and Harley Quinn teaming up with new Squad members Black Manta, Joker's Daughter, the Reverse Flash and Deathstroke.

==== Membership: New Suicide Squad ====
Notable team members from New Suicide Squad include:

- Amanda Waller
- Black Manta
- Captain Boomerang
- Cheetah
- Deadshot
- Deathstroke
- El Diablo
- Joker's Daughter
- Parasite
- Harley Quinn
- Reverse-Flash

=== Suicide Squad (vol. 5) ===
Using the end of the New 52 initiative as a launching point, DC Comics began a second relaunch of its entire line of titles called DC Rebirth in 2016, written by Rob Williams and shifting between Jim Lee, John Romita, Jr., and Tony S. Daniel for art. Suicide Squad (vol. 5) #1 (August 2016) was the debut bimonthly relaunch of the team's comic book title which consisted of Amanda Waller, Deadshot, Rick Flag, Captain Boomerang, Harley Quinn, Killer Croc, Katana and Enchantress. The Suicide Squad was given a new look, reflecting the team's appearance in the DC Extended Universe. The title would crossover with Justice League in Justice League vs. Suicide Squad, written by Joshua Williamson and drawn by Jason Fabok, Tony S. Daniel, and Howard Porter.

==== Burning Down the House ====
Suicide Squad: Burning Down the House is the third collected volume of Suicide Squad (Vol. 5), encompassing issues #11–15 and the War Crimes Special one-shot. Released in September 2017, this arc delves into the Squad's internal conflicts, the return of a formidable adversary, and Amanda Waller's increasingly questionable decisions.

==== Drain the Swamp ====
Waller recruits Juan Soria, a prospective hero who was turned down by the Justice League and then arrested for robbery, into the Squad in order to combat an alien force that feeds off optimism and hope. In preparation for the mission, Waller had systematically broken Soria down to rid him of all hope. This allowed him to defeat the creature. After learning that he was used, Waller relocates Soria to Killer Croc's cell. Croc had previously been tempted to eat Soria and it is assumed this is what happened.

The Squad confronts Damage, who Waller wants to recruit for her Task Force XL. King Faraday, who is being held at Belle Reve, reveals he has been accessing Waller's hidden files and asks about someone named Coretta. Waller is visually shaken by the mention. She leaves the prison and goes to her daughter Coretta in the hospital as she is giving birth. Her son Jessie tells her that Coretta does not want to see her. Hack returns and reveals she is in Belle Reve's computers. She begins opening the cells, erasing files, and murdering guards.

=== Suicide Squad Black ===
DC Comics created a magical version of the Suicide Squad known as Suicide Squad Black in 2019 during the DC Rebirth run. It was created by Jai Nitz and Scot Eaton. The team have a six-issue comic series titled Suicide Squad: Black Files.

The roster consists of the Gentleman Ghost, Azucar, Enchantress, Juniper, Klarion the Witch Boy, Tiamat, and Wither, and El Diablo for a magical roster of the Squad called Suicide Squad Black.

=== Suicide Squad (vol. 6) ===
The monthly Suicide Squad comic was again relaunched at the start of 2020, written by Tom Taylor with art by Bruno Redondo.

The initial storyline features a Task Force X run by a mysterious bureaucrat called Lok directing a team composed of Deadshot, Harley Quinn, Magpie, Cavalier, the Shark, and Zebra-Man to press gang a group of anarchist superhumans called the Revolutionaries. Over the course of the first six issues, several Revolutionaries are killed in action; it transpires that the Revolutionaries were deliberately setting themselves up in infiltrate Task Force X and Lok is a frontman for Black Mask, who is impersonating Ted Kord.

=== Suicide Squad (vol. 7) ===
The Infinite Frontier monthly Suicide Squad comic launched in March 2021, written by Robbie Thompson with art by Eduardo Pansica.

==== Membership: Suicide Squad (vol. 7) ====
Notable team members from Suicide Squad (vol. 7) include:

- Amanda Waller
- Peacemaker
- Nocturna
- Match
- Talon
- Culebra
- Bloodsport
- Ambush Bug
- Black Siren
- Major Force

== Collected editions ==
=== Silver Age ===
#	Title	Material collected	Pages	Year	ISBN
1	Suicide Squad: The Silver Age Omnibus Volume 1	Brave and the Bold #25–27, 37–39; Star Spangled War Stories #110–111, 116–121, 125, 127–128	336	August 2, 2016	978-1401263430

=== Post-Crisis ===
==== Volume 1 ====
#	Title	Material collected	Pages	Year	ISBN
1	Trial by Fire	Suicide Squad #1–8; Secret Origins #14	232	September 8, 2015	978-1401258313
2	The Nightshade Odyssey	Suicide Squad #9–16; Justice League International #13; Doom Patrol/Suicide Squad Special #1	264	December 15, 2015	978-1401258337
3	Rogues	Suicide Squad #17–25, Annual #1	280	April 12, 2016	978-1401260910
4	The Janus Directive	Suicide Squad #26–30; Checkmate! #15–18; Manhunter #14; Firestorm #86; Captain Atom #30	272	July 19, 2016	978-1401262617
5	Apokolips Now	Suicide Squad #31–39	220	December 27, 2016	978-1401265427
6	The Phoenix Gambit	Suicide Squad #40–49	235	May 23, 2017	978-1401269043
7	The Dragon's Hoard	Suicide Squad #50–58	232	December 12, 2017	978-1401274573
8	The Final Mission	Suicide Squad #59–66	192	May 21, 2019	978-1401289539

==== Volume 1 Spin-Offs ====
Title	Material collected	Pages	Year	ISBN
Deadshot: Beginnings	Deadshot #1–4; Detective Comics #474, 518	160	November 5, 2013	978-1401242985
Deadshot: Bulletproof	Deadshot #1–5; Legends of the Dark Knight #214	144	April 21, 2015	978-1401255190

==== Volume 2 ====
#	Title	Material collected	Pages	Year	ISBN
1	Suicide Squad: Casualties of War	Suicide Squad #1–12	296	June 29, 2021	978-1779510693

==== Volume 3 ====
#	Title	Material collected	Pages	Year	ISBN
1	Suicide Squad: From the Ashes	Suicide Squad: Raise the Flag #1–8	192	September 2, 2008	978-1401218669

=== The New 52 ===
==== Volume 4 ====
#	Title	Material collected	Pages	Year	ISBN
1	Kicked in the Teeth	Suicide Squad #1–7	160	July 12, 2012	978-1401235444
2	Basilisk Rising	Suicide Squad #0, 8–13; Resurrection Man #9	192	February 19, 2013	978-1401238445
3	Death is for Suckers	Suicide Squad #14–19	144	October 29, 2013	978-1401243166
4	Discipline and Punish	Suicide Squad #20–23; Detective Comics #23.2; Justice League of America 7.1	144	May 6, 2014	978-1401247010
5	Walled In	Suicide Squad #24–30; Suicide Squad: Amanda Waller #1	208	October 28, 2014	978-1401250126

==== New Suicide Squad ====
#	Title	Material collected	Pages	Year	ISBN
1	Pure Insanity	New Suicide Squad #1–8	192	July 21, 2015	978-1401252380
2	Monsters	New Suicide Squad #9–12, Annual #1	144	February 9, 2016	978-1401261528
3	Freedom	New Suicide Squad #13–16	144	August 2, 2016	978-1401262648
4	Kill Anything	New Suicide Squad #17–20	168	November 22, 2016	978-1401270001

==== Suicide Squad: Most Wanted ====
The Most Wanted miniseries highlight individual members of the Suicide Squad.

Title	Material collected	Pages	Year	ISBN
Suicide Squad Most Wanted: Deadshot	The Deadshot portions from Suicide Squad Most Wanted: Deadshot and Katana #1–6	136	August 9, 2016	978-1401263805
Suicide Squad Most Wanted: Katana	The Katana portions from Suicide Squad Most Wanted: Deadshot and Katana #1–6	128	September 20, 2016	978-1401264642
Suicide Squad Most Wanted: El Diablo	The El Diablo portions from Suicide Squad Most Wanted: El Diablo and Boomerang #1–6	138	April 25, 2017	978-1401268657
Suicide Squad: Secret Files	Suicide Squad Most Wanted #1–6	144	April 18, 2017	978-1401277086

=== DC Rebirth ===
==== Volume 5 ====
#	Title	Material collected	Pages	Publication date	ISBN
1	The Black Vault	Suicide Squad: Rebirth #1; Suicide Squad #1–4	160	March 7, 2017	978-1401269814
2	Going Sane	Suicide Squad #5–8; Harley Quinn and the Suicide Squad April Fool's Special #1	144	June 13, 2017	978-1401270971
Justice League vs. Suicide Squad		Justice League vs. Suicide Squad #1-6; Justice League #12–13; Suicide Squad #8-10	312	December 26, 2017	978-1401274788
3	Burning Down the House	Suicide Squad #11–15; Suicide Squad: War Crimes Special #1	176	September 12, 2017	978-1401274221
4	Earthlings on Fire	Suicide Squad #16–20	144	December 19, 2017	978-1401275396
5	Kill Your Darlings	Suicide Squad #21–25	128	April 17, 2018	978-1401278809
6	The Secret History of Task Force X	Suicide Squad #27–32	144	July 24, 2018	978-1401280987
7	Drain the Swamp	Suicide Squad #33–40	192	October 23, 2018	978-1401284749
8	Constriction	Suicide Squad #41-44, #47-50 and Annual 1	256	August 20, 2019	978-1401288877
Aquaman/Suicide Squad: Sink Atlantis		Suicide Squad #45-46; Aquaman #39-40	104	February 12, 2019	978-1401290726
1	Deluxe Edition Book 1	Suicide Squad #1–8; Harley Quinn and the Suicide Squad April Fool's Special #1; Suicide Squad: Rebirth #1	296	October 24, 2017	978-1401274214
2	Deluxe Edition Book 2	Suicide Squad #9–20; Suicide Squad: War Crimes Special #1	328	May 8, 2018	978-1401278915
3	Deluxe Edition Book 3	Suicide Squad #21–32	296	November 27, 2018	978-1401285166
Suicide Squad by Jim Lee Unwrapped		Suicide Squad April Fool's Special #1; Suicide Squad: Rebirth #1; Suicide Squad #1–8 (penciled artwork only)	160	October 23, 2018	978-1401284534

=== New Justice ===
==== Volume 6 ====
#	Title	Material collected	Pages	Publication date	ISBN
1	Suicide Squad: Bad Blood	Suicide Squad #1–11	288	April 27, 2021	978-1779503954
1	Suicide Squad: Black Files	Suicide Squad: Black Files #1–6	???		978-1779503954
1	Suicide Squad: Katana: The Revenge of Kobra	Suicide Squad: Katana: The Revenge of Kobra #1–6	134	July 9, 2019	978-1779503954

==== Volume 7 ====
#	Title	Material collected	Pages	Publication date	ISBN
1	Suicide Squad: Give Peace a Chance	Suicide Squad #1–6; Future State: Suicide Squad #1-2	208	November 23, 2021	978-1779512758

== In other media ==
=== Television ===
==== Animation ====
Task Force X as they appear in Justice League Unlimited. From left to right: Plastique, Deadshot, Clock King, and Captain Boomerang.

- Task Force X appears in a self-titled episode of Justice League Unlimited, consisting of Rick Flag Jr., Captain Boomerang, Deadshot, Plastique, and Clock King.
- Task Force X appears in the Young Justice episode "Leverage", consisting of Rick Flag, Black Manta, Captain Boomerang, and Monsieur Mallah. In the audio play "The Prize", Brick and Tuppence Terror join the team.
- The Suicide Squad make a cameo appearance in the Harley Quinn episode "Harlivy", consisting of Captain Boomerang, Killer Croc, Enchantress, Deadshot, Katana, and Plastique.
- Task Force X appears in My Adventures with Superman. In the first season, the group is led by Amanda Waller and Sam Lane and consists of Deathstroke, Livewire, Rough House, Mist, Silver Banshee, Anthony Ivo / Parasite, and Heat Wave, who all wear shock collars and work for the government organization of the same name. In Season 2, the team is led by Amanda Waller and consists of Deathstroke, Damage, Atomic Skull, and Lex Luthor.
- The Suicide Squad appears in Suicide Squad Isekai, consisting of Harley Quinn, Deadshot, Peacemaker, Clayface, King Shark, and Rick Flag. Additionally, Ratcatcher, Enchantress, Thinker, and Killer Croc appear as rogue squad members who escaped to another world.
- Task Force X appears in the Teen Titans Go! episode "Task Force X", consisting of Captain Boomerang, Clayface (Matt Hagen), Harley Quinn, Killer Croc, King Shark, Peacemaker and Polka-Dot Man. Additionally, the Teen Titans (Robin, Beast Boy, Cyborg, Raven and Starfire) joined them because they want to fight real villains and do real missions that make a difference.

==== Live-action ====
- The Suicide Squad appear in the tenth season of Smallville, consisting of Rick Flag, Deadshot, Icicle, Plastique, and Warp. This version of the group initially work for Amanda Waller of Checkmate before Chloe Sullivan blackmails them into working for her.
- The Suicide Squad appear in Arrow. Introduced in the second season, this version of the team works for A.R.G.U.S. Director Amanda Waller and initially consists of Deadshot, Shrapnel and Bronze Tiger. Additionally, John Diggle and Lyla Michaels also work as part of the team, but are not implanted with explosives, and Harley Quinn makes a cameo appearance, but is not called for duty. Scheffer is killed by Waller for abandoning the mission while Diggle releases the remaining members from A.R.G.U.S.'s custody to help him stop Waller from bombing Starling City in an attempt to defeat Slade Wilson's army. In the third season, Oliver Queen takes pity on Cupid and hands her over to Waller for use in the squad. Additionally, former member Digger Harkness attempts to seek revenge on Michaels for attempting to terminate him for failing to complete a mission, only to be foiled by Queen and the Flash. In the episode "Suicidal Tendencies", Diggle, Michaels, Deadshot, and Cupid rescue Senator Joseph Cray from a hostage situation, during which Lawton sacrifices himself to save the others after discovering Cray had set up the attack to stage his own rescue and eventually mount a presidential campaign. After Shadowspire kills Waller, Michaels becomes A.R.G.U.S.'s new director and, as part of her efforts to reform the organization, temporarily disbands the squad to rework it into the "Ghost Initiative". She then recruits Cutter, Chien Na Wei, Kane Wolfman, and Ricardo Diaz to locate and capture a terrorist financier named Dante without A.R.G.U.S.'s oversight. However, the operation fails after Diaz disables his explosive implant and warns Dante, who subsequently escapes. When the Joint Chiefs of Staff learn that the squad had been reactivated, Diggle resigns from A.R.G.U.S. to protect Michaels.
  - At San Diego Comic-Con 2014, following the squad's debut episode, Diggle's actor David Ramsey revealed that there had been talk of a spin-off series focused on them. However, Arrow co-producer and comic book writer Keto Shimizu commented in January 2015 that it did not seem like a possibility due to David Ayer's Suicide Squad film being in development at the time. Series producer Greg Berlanti later confirmed that the team's inclusion within Arrow was used in order to test the audience's reception and interest prior to Ayer's film being put into production.

=== Film ===
The Suicide Squad as depicted in their first DCEU film. From left to right: Slipknot, Captain Boomerang, Enchantress, Katana, Rick Flag, Harley Quinn, Deadshot, Killer Croc, and El Diablo.

The Suicide Squad as depicted in Suicide Squad: Hell to Pay. From left to right: Bronze Tiger, Copperhead, Deadshot, Harley Quinn, Captain Boomerang, and Killer Frost.

- The Suicide Squad appears in Batman: Assault on Arkham, consisting of Deadshot, Harley Quinn, King Shark, Killer Frost, Captain Boomerang, Black Spider, and KGBeast while Amanda Waller monitors their activities and controls them with bombs surgically implanted in their spines that she can remotely detonate if they step out of line. After Waller kills KGBeast for attempting to leave, the squad is assigned to infiltrate Arkham Asylum and kill the Riddler, whom they later discover is a former member who discovered how to defuse Waller's bombs. Over the course of the film, Black Spider and King Shark are killed by the bombs before they could be defused, Killer Frost is killed by Bane, Quinn is remanded to Arkham Asylum, Boomerang is captured by the GCPD, and Deadshot escapes.
- The Suicide Squad appear in films set in the DC Extended Universe (DCEU).
  - In Suicide Squad (2016), Amanda Waller recruits Rick Flag, Katana, Deadshot, Harley Quinn, Captain Boomerang, El Diablo, Killer Croc, and Slipknot to save the world from former member Enchantress.
  - In The Suicide Squad (2021), Waller recruits Flag, Quinn, Boomerang, Savant, Blackguard, T.D.K. (The Detachable Kid), Javelin, Mongal, and Weasel to serve as a distraction while Bloodsport, Peacemaker, King Shark, Polka-Dot Man, and Ratcatcher 2 clash with the Thinker and Starro.
- The Suicide Squad appears in films set in the DC Animated Movie Universe (DCAMU):
  - The group first appears in Suicide Squad: Hell to Pay, consisting of Deadshot, Harley Quinn, Captain Boomerang, Bronze Tiger, Killer Frost, and Copperhead. Additionally, Black Manta, Count Vertigo, Punch and Jewelee appear as previous members of the group in a flashback. The present team is assigned to retrieve a "Get Out of Hell Free" card. By the end of the film, Waller detonates Copperhead's bomb to kill the traitorous Killer Frost and Bronze Tiger is killed by Professor Zoom, though Deadshot gives the former the card to send him to heaven.
  - The Suicide Squad appears in Justice League Dark: Apokolips War. Following Waller's death, the group is now led by Harley and consists of Captain Boomerang, King Shark, Black Manta, Bane, and Cheetah. Two years later, the Squad are recruited by Lois Lane to help defeat Darkseid and destroy Apokolips. After Cheetah, Luthor, Bane, and Black Manta are killed, the remaining members and Lane sacrifice themselves to stop the Paradooms from reaching Apokolips.

=== Video games ===
- The New 52 incarnation of the Suicide Squad, simply called "The Squad", appears in Lego Batman 3: Beyond Gotham via "The Squad" DLC pack, consisting of Amanda Waller, Deadshot, Harley Quinn, Captain Boomerang, El Diablo, King Shark, Deathstroke, and Katana.
- The Suicide Squad appear in Suicide Squad: Special Ops, consisting of Rick Flag, Deadshot, Harley Quinn, and El Diablo.
- The Suicide Squad, though not referred to by name, appear in Batman: The Enemy Within's "Vigilante Joker" storyline, consisting of Harley Quinn, Bane, and Catwoman, who work for Amanda Waller and wear bomb collars.
- Task Force X appears in Lego DC Super-Villains, consisting of Bronze Tiger, Captain Boomerang, Deadshot, Enchantress, Harley Quinn, Katana, Killer Croc and King Shark. Amanda Waller appears as a non-playable character.

==== Batman: Arkham ====
- In the post-credits scene of Batman: Arkham Origins, Amanda Waller visits Deathstroke in Blackgate Penitentiary and asks him to join the Suicide Squad in exchange for his freedom.
- In the post-credits scene of Batman: Arkham Origins Blackgate, Waller and Rick Flag Jr. recruit Bronze Tiger and Deadshot into the squad.
- The aforementioned post-credits scenes were meant to lead into a Suicide Squad game previously in development at WB Games Montréal, but as reported by Kotaku in December 2016, the title was later cancelled.
- The Suicide Squad appear in Suicide Squad: Kill the Justice League, consisting of Deadshot, Captain Boomerang, Harley Quinn and King Shark as playable characters, with Rick Flag, Penguin, Gizmo, Hack, Toyman, Ivy and an alternate universe version of Lex Luthor helping them as the Support Squad. Additionally, the following four playable characters were added via DLC: an alternate universe variant of the Joker, an alternate universe version of Mr. Freeze called Mrs. Freeze, Lawless, and Deathstroke.

=== Miscellaneous ===
- The Suicide Squad appear in the Injustice: Gods Among Us and Injustice 2 prequel comics, initially led by Amanda Waller and Rick Flag before Jason Todd, Ra's al Ghul, and Gorilla Grodd separately take command and consisting of Calendar Man, Captain Boomerang, Captain Cold, the Clock King, Deadshot, El Diablo, Harley Quinn, Katana, Killer Croc, Killer Moth, Magpie, Man-Bat, Orca, and Polka-Dot Man, with Black Manta as a former member.
- The Suicide Squad appear in Injustice vs. Masters of the Universe, led by Superman and Wonder Woman and consisting of Bane, Blockbuster, Cheetah, Copperhead, Deathstroke, Gorilla Grodd, Killer Frost, Lobo, Raptor, Riddler, Solomon Grundy, and Two-Face.

== See also ==
- List of government agencies in DC Comics
- Checkmate (comics)
- Janus Directive
- Secret Six (comics)
- Thunderbolts (comics) - Marvel Comics’ equivalent to the Suicide Squad
