= Chemo (character) =

DC Comics supervillain

- Chemo as depicted in Infinite Crisis #4 (March 2006). Art by Phil Jimenez.

Publication information
- Publisher: DC Comics
- First appearance: Showcase #39 (July–August 1962)
- Created by: Robert Kanigher; Ross Andru; Mike Esposito

In-story information
- Species: Robot
- Team affiliations: Injustice League; The Society; Suicide Squad
- Abilities: Superhuman strength and durability; Self-magnification; Regeneration; Toxikinesis; Power mimicry

Chemo is a supervillain appearing in comic books published by DC Comics. Debuting in the Silver Age of Comic Books, the character has appeared in both comic books and other DC Comics-related products such as animated television series and trading cards.

== Publication history ==
The character first appeared in Showcase #39 (July–August 1962) and was created by writer Robert Kanigher and artists Ross Andru and Mike Esposito.

Chemo debuted in a story called "The Deathless Doom" in Showcase #39-40 (July–August & September–October 1962), being the adversary for DC Comics' new superteam the Metal Men. The character returned in Metal Men #14 (July 1965); #25 (May 1967) and #46-47 (July & September 1976).

Chemo reappeared in DC Comics Presents #4 (December 1978); Superman #342 (December 1979) and #370 (April 1982); Crisis on Infinite Earths #9-10 (December 1985-January 1986) and Action Comics #590 (July 1987). Writer Len Wein said in a 2006 interview: "I realized after doing that first story [with Chemo] that here was a villain that was a physical match against Superman, so I kept bringing him back".

The character was reimagined in Supergirl (vol. 4) #5 (January 1997) and then appeared briefly during the Our Worlds At War storyline in The Adventures of Superman #593-594 (August–September 2001) and in Birds of Prey #36 (December 2001) and Joker: Last Laugh #2 (December 2001).

Chemo featured as a major villain in the limited series Infinite Crisis #1-7 (December 2005-June 2006) and appeared in multiple forms in Superman #663 (July 2007). The character also appeared in Outsiders - Five of a Kind: Nightwing/Captain Boomerang (October 2007); Salvation Run #1-7 (November 2007–June 2008) and in Booster Gold (vol. 2) #13 (December 2008).

Writer Mike Conroy noted "where would comic books be without those flukes, those accidents of fate which, although inexplicable to science, result in innocuous materials having a far-reaching impact on the world outside the laboratory?".

== Fictional character biography ==
Chemo was originally a plastic vessel used by scientist Ramsey Norton to contain chemical by-products from his failed experiments. When Norton places the remnants of a failed growth formula in the vessel as his latest contribution, it accidentally brings the vessel to life as Chemo. After killing Norton, Chemo goes on a rampage until it is stopped by Will Magnus' robot team, the Metal Men. Chemo regenerates and returns, but is defeated each time by the Metal Men.

During the Crisis on Infinite Earths, villains Brainiac and Lex Luthor use Chemo as a living weapon on Earth-4. Chemo destroys the alternate universe version of New York City and kills Aquagirl by releasing large quantities of toxic chemicals into the ocean. Chemo is dispersed and neutralized when Negative Woman shatters its plastic shell.

During the Infinite Crisis storyline, the Secret Society of Super Villains employs the Brotherhood of Evil to use Chemo as a living weapon. They drop Chemo onto the city of Blüdhaven, killing thousands of civilians, before Superman hurls it into deep space. While in space, Chemo is retrieved and used as a weapon by the Joker and Gorilla Grodd.

In The New 52 continuity reboot, Chemo was created when a thief threw Will Magnus' prototype responsometer into a vat of chemicals.

== Powers and abilities ==
Chemo has very limited intelligence coupled with immense strength and durability. It can alter its mass, generate corrosive acid, and regenerate if destroyed. On one occasion, Chemo is augmented after absorbing Superman's DNA, gaining strength comparable to his.

== In other media ==
=== Television ===
- Chemo appears in Batman: The Brave and the Bold, voiced by Dee Bradley Baker.
- Chemo appears in the "Metal Men" segment of DC Nation Shorts.
- Chemo appears in the DC Super Hero Girls episode "#SuperWho?". This version was created by unlicensed toxic chemicals.
- Chemo makes a non-speaking cameo appearance in the Creature Commandos episode "Chasing Squirrels". This version is an inmate of Belle Reve Penitentiary.

=== Film ===
Chemo as it appears in Batman Unlimited

Chemo appears in Batman Unlimited: Mechs vs. Mutants, voiced by Dave B. Mitchell.

=== Video games ===
- Chemo appears in DC Universe Online.
- Chemo appears as a character summon in Scribblenauts Unmasked: A DC Comics Adventure.
- Chemo appears as a playable character in DC Legends.

=== Merchandise ===
An action figure based on Chemo was released as part of the "Collect and Connect" line in Mattel's DC Universe Classics 6-inch line.
