= Salvation Run =

2007–2008 DC Comics limited series

- Cover art for Salvation Run #1 (January 2008), art by Sean Chen.

Publication information
- Publisher: DC Comics
- Schedule: Monthly
- Format: Limited series
- Genre: Superhero
- Publication date: November 2007 – June 2008
- No. of issues: 7
- Main character(s): Joker; Lex Luthor; Rogues; Vandal Savage; DeSaad

Creative team
- Written by: Bill Willingham; Lilah Sturges
- Artist(s): Sean Chen; Walden Wong; Joe Bennett; Belardino Brabo

Collected editions
- Salvation Run: ISBN 1-4012-1930-6

Salvation Run is a seven-issue 2007-2008 DC Comics limited series which was designed to tie into the company's major event series Final Crisis in 2008. The series involves a large group of supervillains being exiled to the planet Cygnus 4019, also known as Salvation, where they are given no support to survive.

The concept of Salvation Run is adapted in the second season of Peacemaker, where the planet Salvation is depicted as a prison located in another dimension.

== Premise ==
The series, which is based on a pitch from writers George R. R. Martin and John J. Miller, follows a world where various supervillains are captured by the Suicide Squad and imprisoned on the distant planet of Cygnus 4019. The story features the villains splitting into alliances and either attempting to escape the planet, known as "Salvation", or choosing to rule over it. Bill Willingham started as writer, but had to hand the project over to Lilah Sturges after three issues due to illness. The first issue was released in November 2007.

Major characters in Salvation Run include Lex Luthor, the Joker, the Rogues (Heat Wave, Captain Cold, Weather Wizard, Abra Kadabra and Mirror Master), and other morally ambiguous heroes such as Scandal Savage and Catwoman. Tie-ins to the series were released in Countdown to Final Crisis, Outsiders, Checkmate, Catwoman, and Justice League of America.

A compiled paperback version of Salvation Run was released on September 24, 2008.

== Plot ==
=== Lead-up and premise ===
Following Black Adam's rampage in World War III, the Amazonian attack on the United States, the murder of the Flash (Bart Allen), and the Injustice League's attack upon the wedding of Green Arrow and Black Canary, a government-sponsored secret program is put in place to combat the growing metahuman threat. The purpose of the program is to capture supervillains and exile them to the distant planet Cygnus 4019. Several Suicide Squad members, including Bane and Deadshot, are sent to Salvation once they are no longer needed. According to Rick Flag Jr., the prisoners are not given any supplies or equipment for their survival, as that would make the government responsible for them. Once they are off-world, they are no longer Earth's responsibility. Cygnus 4019 was intended to be peaceful, but was turned into a "training planet" for the New Gods of Apokolips, overseen by DeSaad.

=== Main plot ===
Having arrived on the planet first, the Rogues (Abra Kadabra, Captain Cold, Heat Wave, Mirror Master, and Weather Wizard) find that the planet is seemingly designed to kill any visitors. The planet is inhabited by numerous hazardous species which constantly attack. Kadabra deciphers the language of the local pygmies and learns of the "Safe Zone", a "miles long district where all of the dangers have been disarmed by gods from the stars". During their journey, the group hears a second Boom Tube arrive, indicating the arrival of more prisoners, and decide to go back. The Rogues briefly attempt to assert their leadership over the second group by virtue of their experience.

Psimon states his intent to build a civilization, requiring that the women be used solely for reproduction and that escape from the planet be given up as an option. This is met with loud disdain from many others, especially the women. The Joker kills Psimon by bashing his head in with a rock. Meanwhile, Rick Flag Jr. transports Bane, Chemo, Lex Luthor, Catwoman, Blockbuster, and Deadshot to Cygnus, seeing no further use for Bane and Deadshot. Luthor manages to gain the support of the entire supervillain body, saying that he intends to lead them.

Lex Luthor announces that he, Doctor Sivana, Professor Ivo and General Immortus have devised a way to escape Cygnus. As he is orating, the Joker voices his distrust for Luthor as a leader, annoyed that he expects everybody else to listen when he has not told them his plan. The Joker questions why they should accept any authority there, when they did not accept it back on Earth. A bigger fight starts to break out in the camp between those who are working and those who are not, which escalates until Iron Cross threatens the Joker. The Joker shoots and kills Iron Cross, then announces that he and Grodd are having a mutiny. Soon, those loyal to Luthor and those who prefer the Joker have a massive battle, razing most of the camp in the process. Grodd uses his telepathic powers to calm everybody down, then leaves with the Joker to make it on their own elsewhere with their loyalists. Blockbuster is revealed to be a disguised Martian Manhunter, who has been sent to observe the villains.

Catwoman spies on Martian Manhunter in the woods, learning his secrets. Lex Luthor is still having to soothe tensions in his camp, this time between the Body Doubles, Bane, and Deadshot. His camp distrusts them because of the role they played in the Salvation deportation, but to show he trusts them, Luthor hires Deadshot and Bane as security, offering them one million dollars when they return to Earth. Tensions are even higher in the Joker's camp as the Joker is proving to be an ineffective, if fearsome, leader. Brain and Monsieur Mallah arrive at the Joker's camp, and Mallah asks Grodd to speak with him away from the others. Mallah proposes an alliance, but Grodd refuses and kills him and Brain. On a separate part of the planet, Vandal Savage reaches the Safe Zone.

The Joker leads his group on a night-time raid on Luthor's camp in search of supplies. During the raid, Catwoman is discovered sneaking around in trees, bringing suspicion upon herself as a "good guy" spy. To prove her innocence, she outs Blockbuster as Martian Manhunter, resulting in him being captured. One week later, the Joker begins to oppose Lex Luthor's leadership, leading them into a heated conflict. As the fight ends, DeSaad sends Parademons to attack the inmates.

The villains defeat the Parademons, but Lex Luthor surmises this to be just the first wave. Catwoman informs Lex Luthor about Vandal Savage's camp and leads them to it. Luthor convinces Savage to help complete the teleportation device and return them all home. Gorilla Grodd rejoins the group and attempts to murder the Joker for his attempt to kill him. They are interrupted by another Parademon patrol who are quickly defeated. With the machine finished, the villains return to Earth. Luthor leaves last, revealing that he used Heatmonger, Thunder and Lightning, Plasmus, Neutron, and Warp to power the teleporter. After Luthor leaves, the teleporter explodes, killing the Parademons and the villains used to power the teleporter.

== Aftermath ==
In Justice League of America #21, it is revealed that Martian Manhunter was still imprisoned when the villains left Cygnus 4019. During the events of Final Crisis, Martian Manhunter is freed by Libra at the behest of the Human Flame.

== Collected editions ==
The series has been collected into a trade paperback:

- Salvation Run (192 pages, September 2008, ISBN 1-4012-1930-6, Titan Books, November 2008, ISBN 1-84576-981-3)

== In other media ==
Salvation appears in the Peacemaker episode "Full Nelson". This version is a dimension that was chosen by Rick Flag Sr. to serve as a metahuman prison.
