= General Immortus =

DC Comics supervillain

- General Immortus as depicted in Final Crisis Aftermath: Run! #2 (August 2009). Art by Kako.

Publication information
- Publisher: DC Comics
- First appearance: My Greatest Adventure #80 (June 1963)
- Created by: Arnold Drake; Bob Haney; Bruno Premiani; Murray Boltinoff

In-story information
- Species: Human
- Place of origin: Earth
- Team affiliations: Brotherhood of Evil
- Notable aliases: The Baron; Eternal Flame
- Abilities: Longevity; Alchemy; Expert in the occult Centuries of knowledge Criminal genius Pyrokinesis

General Immortus is a fictional character appearing in American comic books published by DC Comics. He has also been called "The Forever Soldier" or "The Forever General".

== Publication history ==
Immortus debuted in My Greatest Adventure #80 alongside the Doom Patrol, and was created by Arnold Drake, Bob Haney, Bruno Premiani, and Murray Boltinoff. Initially, My Greatest Adventure was an anthology series, with the Doom Patrol appearing as a one-off feature. However, the team proved popular and continued to appear in the series, which was renamed after them. Immortus was transitioned into the renamed series, remaining an enemy of the Doom Patrol.

== Fictional character biography ==
General Immortus is perhaps centuries old, and his origins are shrouded in mystery. At some points, it has even been implied that Immortus' origins lie in ancient history, having claimed on at least one occasion to have been alive at "the Dawn of Man". He once owned a diamond mine, the source of much of his current-day wealth, and he killed many of the slave workers to keep the location a secret, which even remains today. However, little beyond this information has ever been revealed about Immortus' past. His real name has never been revealed, nor his country of origin, although it is implied to be somewhere in Europe.

Until coming into contact with the Doom Patrol, Immortus had sustained his life indefinitely with an alchemical potion, but Immortus eventually lost the formula and was unable to reproduce it. As his previous stocks began to run out he began to once again age, this time rapidly. Immortus hired scientist Niles Caulder to recreate the potion. When Caulder discovered Immortus's identity and plan, he sabotaged the "life extending ray" that he had been developing. Caulder, as "The Chief", formed the Doom Patrol specifically to combat one of Immortus' later schemes.

Most of Immortus' schemes involve him sustaining his longevity by finding a substitute for the elixir of life he had lost. He founds and leads a secretive criminal syndicate to steal ancient tomes and mystical artifacts and sustain his life. This syndicate is militaristic, hence Immortus' title of "general", and not unlike the Thule Society in its philosophy and dabbling in the occult.

In Salvation Run, Immortus is killed by Parademons. However, he resurfaces in Final Crisis. He is now recruiting followers into his Army of the Endangered. Immortus has Professor Milo operate upon them to give them powers, including established non-powered villains Sportsmaster, Polka-Dot Man, Condiment King and the Human Flame as well as new villains Brown Recluse, Miss Army Knife, N-Emy, Phoney Baloney, and Seductress. He ensures that use of these abilities causes pain until the villains have proved themselves unconditionally. The Human Flame overcomes both the pain and an additional failsafe installed by Milo to disable his powers if necessary. He grievously burns Immortus and kills all of his new followers, save for his lover Seductress, who stays at his side.

In the series Unstoppable Doom Patrol, Immortus leads the Brotherhood of Evil in an assault on the Doom Patrol. While the Brotherhood's members distract the Doom Patrol, Immortus and Houngan dig up the corpse of Dorothy Spinner, which they use in a ritual to fuse Immortus with the entity Candlemaker. Now calling himself the Eternal Flame, Immortus attacks the Doom Patrol until the Quiz traps him in the Bleed, the space between realities.

== Powers and abilities ==
General Immortus is a cunning criminal mastermind and has lived for centuries as a result of his life-extending potion. As the Eternal Flame, he can generate fire.

== In other media ==
=== Television ===
- General Immortus appears in Teen Titans, voiced by Xander Berkeley. This version is a member of the Brotherhood of Evil.
- General Immortus appears in the "Doom Patrol" segment of DC Nation Shorts, voiced by Clancy Brown.
- Immortus appears in the fourth season of Doom Patrol. This version is an interdimensional deity.

=== Video games ===
General Immortus appears as a character summon in Scribblenauts Unmasked: A DC Comics Adventure.

=== Miscellaneous ===
- General Immortus appears in Teen Titans Go!. Additionally, a heroic, alternate universe incarnation of Immortus appears in issue #48 as a member of the Brotherhood of Justice.
- General Immortus appears in Batman: The Brave and the Bold #6.
