= Brain (DC Comics) =

The Brain
- Monsieur Mallah with the Brain, from the cover to Outsiders (vol. 3) #37. Art by Daniel Acuña.

Publication information
- Publisher: DC Comics
- First appearance: Doom Patrol #86 (March 1964)
- Created by: Arnold Drake (writer); Bruno Premiani (artist)

In-story information
- Alter ego: Unknown (Pre-Crisis and Post-Crisis); Ernst ("The New 52" continuity)
- Species: Cyborg
- Team affiliations: Brotherhood of Evil; Injustice League; Secret Society of Super Villains
- Partnerships: Monsieur Mallah
- Notable aliases: Ultimax
- Abilities: (Currently): Genius-level intellect; Bionic surrogacy; (Formerly): Mass consciousness

The Brain is a supervillain appearing in American comic books published by DC Comics. Commonly as a frequent enemy of the Doom Patrol, Justice League, and the Teen Titans, he is a French genius and criminal mastermind.

The Brain appears as the main antagonist in the third season of the HBO Max series Doom Patrol, voiced by Riley Shanahan.

== Publication history ==
The Brain first appeared in Doom Patrol #86 (March 1964) and was created by Arnold Drake and Bruno Premiani. Drake later commented: "I used that same concept in a Jerry Lewis comic book, and in a Bob Hope comic I had a totem pole that talked to him. Often times, I wrote the same storylines for the comedy stuff that I wrote for the serious stuff. I just turned it on its head".

== Fictional character biography ==
As a scientist, the Brain performs experiments on animals to raise their intelligence. One of these is on a gorilla, who he names Monsieur Mallah and educates for almost a decade before making him his assistant. His colleague Niles Caulder grows jealous of his work and arranges for the Brain to get caught in an explosion, which destroys his body. Only the brain survives, which Caulder plans on putting into a robotic body. Mallah rescues the Brain, transferring him to a computer network that keeps him functioning.

The Brain and Mallah form the Brotherhood of Evil in hopes of conquering the world and getting revenge on Caulder, recruiting Madame Rouge, General Immortus, and Garguax. Caulder, now known as the "Chief", through a series of other accidents that he manipulated, forms the Doom Patrol. The Brain, Mallah, and their Brotherhood's criminal activities also pit them against the Teen Titans. The Brotherhood go against the newly formed Justice League, with the Brain using a genetic splicer to take the Flash's legs, Green Lantern's ring, Black Canary's vocal chords, and Martian Manhunter's eyes. The Brain is defeated by the League and the Doom Patrol, the League using cybernetic implants created by Niles Caulder to compensate for their lost powers. Aquaman is thrown to the Brain, overpowers his control of the ring, and separates the Brain from his makeshift body.

Art from Doom Patrol (vol. 2) #34, by Richard Case.

During Grant Morrison's Doom Patrol run, Mallah has the Brain placed in one of Robotman's bodies. The two confess their love for one another and kiss. However, Robotman's body had developed sentience and vowed never to be enslaved by a brain again. When Mallah places the Brain in Robotman's body, which triggers a self-destruct mechanism and explodes as the two kiss. The two later resurface (the Brain back to floating in a jar), with no explanation of how they survived the explosion.

In Salvation Run, Brain and Mallah are among the villains exiled to the planet Cygnus 4019. An altercation between Mallah and Gorilla Grodd ends with Grodd beating Mallah to death with Brain's chassis, killing them both.

Brain is resurrected following The New 52 continuity reboot. This version is a scientist named Ernst who was mortally wounded in an explosion and saved by Monsieur Mallah, who preserved his brain. After becoming distrustful of humans, Brain and Mallah attack humans who they blame for their plight.

In the Dawn of DC series Unstoppable Doom Patrol, Mallah betrays and kills Brain, believing that their relationship is toxic and no longer loving.

== Powers and abilities ==
The Brain is highly intelligent and a master of manipulation. His body is armed with a variety of weapons. On the rare occasion when the Brain has been vulnerable without robotic protection or assistance from other villains, he has protected himself using telekinesis.

== Other characters named Brain ==
DC Comics previously had other villains named the Brain:

- The first villain was a human criminal who earned his nickname for his cleverness and battled the Seven Soldiers of Victory.
- The second villain to use the name Brain was a crime boss who fought Flash.
- The third villain to use the name Brain is a crime boss who fought Wonder Woman and manipulated her into questioning her own existence.
- The fourth villain to use the name Brain is a criminal mastermind who fought Superman.

== Other versions ==
On Earth-S, the Brain is the name used by Warden Loomis, a serial killer who is an enemy of Mr. Scarlet and Pinky the Whiz Kid.

== In other media ==
=== Television ===
- The Brain appears in The Superman/Aquaman Hour of Adventure episode "The Brain, the Brave and the Bold".
- The Brain appears in Teen Titans, voiced by Glenn Shadix. This version is the leader of the Brotherhood of Evil.
- The Brain appears in Batman: The Brave and the Bold, voiced by Dee Bradley Baker. This version possesses a variety of weapons mounted on extendable robotic arms.
- The Brain appears in Young Justice, voiced initially by Nolan North and subsequently by Corey Burton. This version is a leading member of the Light until he is captured by the Team.
- The Brain appears in Teen Titans Go! (2013), voiced by Scott Menville.
- The Brain appears in the Justice League Action episode "The Brain Buster", voiced by Jim Ward.
- The Brain appears in Doom Patrol, voiced by an uncredited Riley Shanahan. This version has had several encounters with the eponymous team, with one seeing him using his Ultimax form before Steve Dayton claimed his robotic body, though the Brain escaped. In the present, the Brain tasks Madame Rouge with attacking the Doom Patrol and stealing Robotman's body for him as her initiation into the Brotherhood of Evil. After taking control of the body however, Monsieur Mallah leaves him before Robotman gains control of Brain's brain jar and discarded giant robot and defeats him. After salvaging Robotman's body, Rita Farr kills Brain.
- The Brain appears in My Adventures with Superman, voiced by Jesse Inocalla. This version is a kind-hearted but short-tempered German scientist who originally worked for Project Cadmus until Task Force X raided the Brain's base, which resulted in the latter's body being destroyed, though his namesake and heart were saved.

=== Video games ===
- The Brain appears in DC Universe Online, voiced by Leif Anders.
- The Brain appears as the final boss of the Nintendo DS version of Batman: The Brave and the Bold – The Videogame.
- The Brain appears as a character summon in Scribblenauts Unmasked: A DC Comics Adventure.
- The Brain makes a cameo appearance in Injustice: Gods Among Us as part of the Insurgency headquarters stage.
- The Brain appears as a non-playable character in Lego DC Super-Villains, voiced by Jason Spisak.

=== Miscellaneous ===
- The Brain appears in Teen Titans Go! (2004).
- The Brain appears in Justice League Adventures #6.
- The Brain appears in Justice League Unlimited #31.
- The Brain appears in Smallville Season 11 #9.
- The Young Justice incarnation of the Brain appears in the Young Justice tie-in comic book series. This version was originally among a group of scientists, led by an old woman who would become the Ultra-Humanite, who settled in Bwunda to conduct experiments on the native gorillas before having his brain transplanted into a robotic container.
