= List of Doom Patrol members =

The Doom Patrol is a team of comic book superheroes, as published by DC Comics. The roster of the team has changed a great deal over the years. These roster lists are of the members during the Patrol's various incarnations by team iteration.

The codenames listed under Character are those used during the time frame of the particular iteration. Characters with more than one codename for that period have them listed chronologically and separated by a slash (/). Bolded names in the most recent iteration published are the current team members. First appearance is the place where the character first appeared as a member of a particular iteration. It is not necessarily the first appearance of the character in print, nor the story depicting how the character joined the team.

All information is listed in publication order first, then alphabetical.

== Original roster ==
This roster covers the iteration of the team that appeared during the 1960s under the tenure of writers Arnold Drake and Bob Haney.

Members of the original Doom Patrol line-up
Character	Real name	First appearance	Notes
The Chief	Niles Caulder	My Greatest Adventure #80 (June 1963)	Founding members.; Apparent death in Doom Patrol #121 (September/October 1968)
Elasti-Girl	Rita Farr	My Greatest Adventure #80 (June 1963)	Founding members.; Apparent death in Doom Patrol #121 (September/October 1968)
Negative Man	Larry Trainor	My Greatest Adventure #80 (June 1963)	Founding members.; Apparent death in Doom Patrol #121 (September/October 1968)
Robotman	Cliff Steele	My Greatest Adventure #80 (June 1963)	Founding members.; Apparent death in Doom Patrol #121 (September/October 1968)
Mento	Steve Dayton	Doom Patrol #91 (November 1964)	Associate and member by marriage.
Beast Boy	Garfield Logan	Doom Patrol #99 (November 1965)	Associate and member by adoption.; Later a member of: Titans West; New Teen Titans; Teen Titans / Titans; Titans L.A.

== Second roster ==
This roster covers the iteration of the team that appeared from the late 1970s through the mid-1990s. After sporadic appearances in various titles from 1977 to 1987, the team was given its own title, Doom Patrol vol. 2, from October 1987 (#1) until February 1995 (#87). The revised series progressed through writers Paul Kupperberg, Grant Morrison, and finally Rachel Pollack.

Members of the 1980s and Vertigo Doom Patrol line-up
Character	Real name	First appearance	Notes
Celsius	Arani Desai-Caulder	Showcase #94 (August/September 1977)	Died in Doom Patrol vol. 2, #17 (Holiday 1988)
Tempest	Joshua Clay	Showcase #94 (August/September 1977)	Stopped using a codename during Morrison's tenure.; Died in Doom Patrol vol. 2, #55 (May 1992).
Negative Woman	Valentina Vostok	Showcase #94 (August/September 1977)	Resigned after losing her powers in Doom Patrol vol. 2, #18 (January 1989).; Went on to work with Checkmate in Checkmate! #15 (May 1989).; Apparently killed at some point after being controlled by Darkseid in Final Crisis: Resist.
Robotman	Cliff Steele	Showcase #94 (August/September 1977)	Shown to have survived apparent death in Showcase #94.; Apparent death in Doom Patrol vol. 3, #9 (August 2002).
Larry Trainor		Doom Patrol vol. 2, #2 (November 1987)	Became part of Rebis in Doom Patrol vol. 2, #19 (February 1989).
Lodestone / The Pupa	Rhea Jones	Doom Patrol vol. 2, #4 (January 1988)	Lapsed into a coma in Invasion! #3 (1988).
Karma	Wayne Hawkins	Doom Patrol vol. 2, #4 (January 1988)	Died in Suicide Squad #58 (October 1991).
Blaze	Scott Fischer	Doom Patrol vol. 2, #6 (March 1988)	Died in Invasion! #3 (1988).
The Chief / The Head	Niles Caulder	Doom Patrol vol. 2, #16 (Winter 1988)	Shown to have survived his death in Doom Patrol vol. 2, #9 (June 1988).; Apparent death in Doom Patrol vol. 2, #87 (February 1995).
Crazy Jane	Kay Challis	Doom Patrol vol. 2, #19 (February 1989)	
Rebis	Larry Trainor / Eleanor Poole	Doom Patrol vol. 2, #19 (February 1989)	
Dorothy Spinner		Doom Patrol vol. 2, #14 (November 1988) (joined in #25, August 1989)	Death in Doom Patrol vol. 3, #22 (September 2003)
Danny the Street		Doom Patrol vol. 2, #35 (August 1990)	
The Bandage People	George and Marion	Doom Patrol vol. 2, #67 (June 1993)	
Charlie the Doll	The Inner Child	Doom Patrol vol. 2, #67 (June 1993)	
Coagula	Kate Godwin	Doom Patrol vol. 2, #70 (September 1993)	Died in Doom Patrol vol. 3, #9 (August 2002).
Alice Wired for Sound		Vertigo Jam #1 (August 1993)	Alice was one of the ghosts who haunted the Doom Patrol HQ, and was captured by the Chief, who combined himself with her as a means for mobility.
The False Memory	The Identity Addict	Doom Patrol vol. 2, #69 (August 1993)	The False Memory was one of many superhero identities used by the Identity Addict. While the Addict made its first appearance in #68, the False Memory's first appearance was #69.; The False Memory was not an actual member of the Doom Patrol, but used her ability to alter people's memories to integrate herself into the team, before she was discovered by Dorothy Spinner and kicked out. But only in #83, she was a member.

== Third roster ==
This roster covers the iteration of the team that appeared from 2001 through 2003 under the tenure of John Arcudi.

Doom Patrol line-up from volume 3
Character	Real name	First appearance	Notes
Robotman	Cliff Steele	Doom Patrol vol. 3, #1 (December 2001)	Revealed to be a mental projection in Doom Patrol vol. 3, #5 (April 2002).
Fever	Shyleen Lao	Doom Patrol vol. 3, #1 (December 2001)	Killed in Terror Titans #1 (December 2008).
Freak	Ava	Doom Patrol vol. 3, #1 (December 2001)	
Kid Slick	Vic Darge	Doom Patrol vol. 3, #1 (December 2001)	
Beast Boy	Garfield Logan	Doom Patrol vol. 3, #4 (March 2002)	
Doctor Light	Kimiyo Hoshi	Doom Patrol vol. 3, #4 (March 2002)	Former member of the Justice League.
Elongated Man	Ralph Dibny	Doom Patrol vol. 3, #4 (March 2002)	Former member of the Justice League. Killed in 52 #42.
Metamorpho	Rex Mason	Doom Patrol vol. 3, #4 (March 2002)	Former and later member of the Outsiders.; Former member of the Justice League.
Fast Forward	Ted Bruder	Doom Patrol vol. 3, #9 (August 2002)	Placed in a medically induced coma in Doom Patrol vol. 5 #16

== Fourth roster ==
This roster covers the iteration of the team that first appeared in 2004. Under the tenure of John Byrne, this iteration was retconned to be the first in continuity appearance of the team. A later story arc brought all previous appearances back into continuity.

Doom Patrol line-up from volume 4
Character	Real name	First appearance	Notes
The Chief	Niles Caulder	JLA #94 (Early May 2004)	First appearance is a retcon removing all previous appearances.; Teen Titans vol. 3, #32 (March 2006) brought all previous appearances back into continuity.
Elasti-Girl	Rita Farr	JLA #94 (Early May 2004)	First appearance is a retcon removing all previous appearances.; Teen Titans vol. 3, #32 (March 2006) brought all previous appearances back into continuity.
Negative Man	Larry Trainor	JLA #94 (Early May 2004)	First appearance is a retcon removing all previous appearances.; Teen Titans vol. 3, #32 (March 2006) brought all previous appearances back into continuity.
Robotman	Cliff Steele	JLA #94 (Early May 2004)	First appearance is a retcon removing all previous appearances.; Teen Titans vol. 3, #32 (March 2006) brought all previous appearances back into continuity.
Grunt	Henry Bucher	JLA #94 (Early May 2004)	Missing in action in Doom Patrol vol. 5, #1 (August 2009)
Nudge	Mi-Sun Kwon	JLA #94 (Early May 2004)	Killed in action in Doom Patrol vol. 5, #1 (August 2009)
Vortex		JLA #94 (Early May 2004)	Quit in Doom Patrol vol. 4, #18 (January 2006)
Faith	Unknown	Doom Patrol vol. 4, #1 (August 2004)	Former member of the Justice League, sent to train Nudge's telepathic powers.; Quit in Doom Patrol vol. 4, #5 (December 2004)
Beast Boy	Garfield Logan	Teen Titans vol. 3, #34 (May 2006), but doesn't appear as members in the Doom Patrol vol. 4 comics	
Bumblebee	Karen Beecher-Duncan	Teen Titans vol. 3, #34 (May 2006), but doesn't appear as members in the Doom Patrol vol. 4 comics	Former member of: Teen Titans; Titans L.A.
Mento	Steve Dayton	Teen Titans vol. 3, #36 (July 2006), but does not appear as a member in Doom Patrol vol. 4 comics	
Vox	Malcolm Duncan	Teen Titans vol. 3, #36 (July 2006), but does not appear as a member in Doom Patrol vol. 4 comics	Former member of: Teen Titans; Titans L.A.

== Fifth roster ==
This roster returns the team to its original lineup.

Revised original Doom Patrol line-up from volume 5
Character	Real name	First appearance	Notes
The Chief	Doctor Niles Caulder	Doom Patrol vol. 5, #1 (October 2009)	
Elasti-Girl	Rita Farr	Doom Patrol vol. 5, #1 (October 2009)	
Negative Man	Larry Trainor	Doom Patrol vol. 5, #1 (October 2009)	
Robotman	Cliff Steele	Doom Patrol vol. 5, #1 (October 2009)	
Nudge	Mi-Sun Kwon	Doom Patrol vol. 5, #1 (October 2009)	Killed in action in Doom Patrol vol. 5, #1.
Grunt	Henry Bucher	Doom Patrol vol. 5, #1 (October 2009)	Missing in action in Doom Patrol vol. 5, #1.
Bumblebee	Karen Beecher-Duncan	Doom Patrol vol. 5, #1 (October 2009)	Former member of: Teen Titans; Titans L.A.
Black Hole		Doom Patrol vol. 5, #2 (November 2009)	
Mento	Steve Dayton	Doom Patrol vol. 5, #3 (December 2009)	Associate, not shown to be active team member.
Crazy Jane	Kay Challis	Doom Patrol vol. 5, #7 (February 2010)	
Danny the Street		Doom Patrol vol. 5, #7 (February 2010)	
Ambush Bug	Irwin Schwab	Doom Patrol vol. 5, #9 (April 2010)	

== Sixth roster ==
In September 2011, The New 52 rebooted DC's continuity. This roster is the first roster of the team in that continuity.

New 52 Doom Patrol line-up
Character	Real name	First appearance	Notes
Element Woman	Emily Sung	Flashpoint #1 (May 2011)	Former member of the Justice League.
Robotman	Cliff Steele	My Greatest Adventure vol. 2 #1 (December 2011)	
The Chief	Niles Caulder	Ravagers #4 (October 2012)	
Celsius	Arani Desai	Justice League vol. 2 #24 (December 2013)	
Tempest	Joshua Clay	Justice League vol. 2 #24 (December 2013)	
Negative Woman	Valentina Vostok	Justice League vol. 2 #24 (December 2013)	Killed in Justice League vol. 2 #27 (March 2014).
Scorch	Scott Fischer	Justice League vol. 2 #27 (March 2014)	Killed in Justice League vol. 2 #27 (March 2014).
Karma	Wayne Hawkins	Justice League vol. 2 #27 (March 2014)	Killed in Justice League vol. 2 #27 (March 2014).
Elasti-Woman	Rita Farr	Justice League vol. 2 #30 (July 2014)	
Negative Man	Larry Trainor	Justice League vol. 2 #30 (July 2014)	

== Seventh roster ==
This roster is featured in the Young Animal imprint.

Young Animal Doom Patrol line-up
Character	Real name	First appearance	Notes
Robotman	Cliff Steele	Doom Patrol vol. 6 (2016) #1 (September 2016)	
Casey Brinke		Doom Patrol vol. 6 (2016) #1 (September 2016)	
Danny the Street	Danny	Doom Patrol vol. 6 (2016) #1 (September 2016)	Also appears as Danny the Brick, Danny the Ambulance, and Dannyland.
Sam Reynolds		Doom Patrol vol. 6 (2016) #1 (September 2016)	
Ricardo		Doom Patrol vol. 6 (2016) #1 (September 2016)	
The Chief	Niles Caulder	Doom Patrol vol. 6 (2016) #1 (September 2016)	
Lotion		Doom Patrol vol. 6 (2016) #1 (September 2016)	
Terry None		Doom Patrol vol. 6 (2016) #1 (September 2016)	
Negative Man	Larry Trainor	Doom Patrol vol. 6 (2016) #2 (October 2016)	
Flex Mentallo		Doom Patrol vol. 6 (2016) #2 (October 2016)	
Fugg		Doom Patrol vol. 6 (2016) #3 (November 2016)	
Lucius Reynolds		Doom Patrol vol. 6 (2016) #4 (January 2017)	
Jane	Kay Challis	Doom Patrol vol. 6 (2016) #6 (April 2017)	
Valerie Reynolds		Doom Patrol vol. 6 (2016) #6 (April 2017)	
Elasti-Girl	Rita Farr	Doom Patrol/JLA Special (2018) #1 (February 2018)	

== Eighth roster ==
This roster is featured in the Dawn of DC series Unstoppable Doom Patrol and current roster of the team.

Dawn of DC Doom Patrol line-up
Character	Real name	First appearance	Notes
The Chief / Crazy Jane	Kay Challis	Lazarus Planet: Dark Fate #1 (February 2023)	
Elasti-Woman	Rita Farr	Lazarus Planet: Dark Fate #1 (February 2023)	
Negative Man	Larry Trainor	Lazarus Planet: Dark Fate #1 (February 2023)	
Psylosimon	Simon Choe	Lazarus Planet: Dark Fate #1 (February 2023)	
Robotman	Cliff Steele	Lazarus Planet: Dark Fate #1 (February 2023)	
Beast Girl	Kareli	Unstoppable Doom Patrol #1 (March 2023)	
Degenerate	Maurice	Unstoppable Doom Patrol #1 (March 2023)	
The Chief	Niles Caulder	Unstoppable Doom Patrol #2 (March 2023)	Retired.
Dr. Syncho	Jerry	Unstoppable Doom Patrol #2 (March 2023)	Team therapist. "Jerry" is an acronym for the group of imps that control Syncho: Jychn, Eylhm, Raz, Rez, and Yzd.
Flex Mentallo		Unstoppable Doom Patrol #2 (March 2023)	
Lotion		Unstoppable Doom Patrol #2 (March 2023)	Member of the Grave Minders.
Lucius Reynolds		Unstoppable Doom Patrol #2 (March 2023)	Member of the Grave Minders.
Mento	Steve Dayton	Unstoppable Doom Patrol #2 (March 2023)	Retired.
Velvet		Unstoppable Doom Patrol #2 (March 2023)	Infiltrated the Doom Patrol as part of Task Force X.
Willoughby Kipling		Unstoppable Doom Patrol #2 (March 2023)	Member of the Grave Minders.
Worm		Unstoppable Doom Patrol #2 (March 2023)	A construct created by Worm who infiltrated the Doom Patrol as part of Task Force X. Killed in Unstoppable Doom Patrol #2 (March 2023).
Starbro	Mason	Unstoppable Doom Patrol #3 (May 2023)	
Coagula	Kate Godwin	Titans #26 (October 2025)	Resurrected in DC Pride: A Celebration of Rachel Pollack #1 (June 2024)

== DC Universe / Max series (2018–2023) ==
This roster was featured in the video on demand streaming service, DC Universe, which was later transferred to HBO Max.

Max TV series Doom Patrol line-up
Character	Real name	Performed by	Notes
The Chief	Niles Caulder	Timothy Dalton	Founding member and former team leader. Deceased.
Celsius	Arani Desai	Jasmine Kaur (younger); Madhur Jaffrey (elder)	Former members of the original team. Deceased.
Lodestone	Rhea Jones	Lisa Wilson	Former members of the original team. Deceased.
Mento	Steve Dayton	Will Kemp (younger); Dave Bielawski (elder)	Former members of the original team. Deceased.
Elasti-Woman	Rita Farr	April Bowlby	Current members of the modern team.
Negative Man	Larry Trainor	Matt Bomer; Matthew Zuk (stand-in)	Current members of the modern team.
Robotman	Cliff Steele	Brendan Fraser; Riley Shanahan (stand-in)	Current members of the modern team.
Crazy Jane	Kay Challis	Diane Guerrero	Current members of the modern team.
Cyborg	Victor Stone	Joivan Wade	Current members of the modern team.
Dorothy Spinner		Abi Monterey	Former member of the modern team.
Madame Rouge	Laura De Mille	Michelle Gomez	Current member of the modern team.
