= Dorothy Spinner =

- Dorothy Spinner as depicted in Who's Who in the DC Universe #10 (June 1991). Art by Richard Case (penciller), Mark McKenna (inker), and Tom McCraw (colorist).

Publication information
- Publisher: DC Comics
- First appearance: Doom Patrol vol. 2 #14 (November 1988)
- Created by: Paul Kupperberg; Erik Larsen

In-story information
- Team affiliations: Doom Patrol; The Wild Girls and Crowdark
- Abilities: The ability to bring imaginary beings into and out of creation.

Dorothy Spinner is a fictional character created by Paul Kupperberg, appearing in American comic books published by DC Comics. She was a former member of the Doom Patrol with the ability to bring imaginary beings to life. Dorothy first appeared in Doom Patrol vol. 2, #14 (November 1988) as a background character until she was made a full member a few issues later.

Dorothy Spinner appears in Doom Patrol (2019), portrayed by Abi Monterey.

== Publication history ==
Dorothy Spinner first appeared in issue #14 of the second volume of the series Doom Patrol. Her name is an in-joke referring to Dorothy Gale and how she arrived in Oz, by a tornado, or spinning wind. Also, in her first appearance and in her appearances on the covers of the Doom Patrol graphic novels, Dorothy is dressed like Dorothy Gale.

== Fictional character biography ==
Dorothy Spinner was given up for adoption as a child and adopted by a Midwestern couple. Dorothy has an ape-like appearance with hairy arms and a deformed face, causing her to be ostracized and grow up isolated from society with only her imaginary friends for company. She eventually discovered that she had the power to bring these "friends" to life. Her imaginary friends even taught her how to read and write since she was not allowed to go to school.

Dorothy's psychological vulnerability makes her the perfect target for the Candlemaker, a malignant egregore who was removed from the physical plane of existence eons ago and seeks to come back through Dorothy's powers. After being bullied by a group of boys, Dorothy wishes that they would die, which the Candlemaker obliges to. The next day, one of the boys is found disemboweled and crucified in a field.

Dorothy meets the Doom Patrol when they are eaten by the Chaos Lord Pythia. This happened near Dorothy's home; when she goes to investigate the energy bursts and discovers her favorite team fighting a monster, she is swallowed by Pythia as well. Dorothy pelts Pythia with rocks, which destroys Pythia and resurrects the Doom Patrol. Starting with the Grant Morrison run of the Doom Patrol, Dorothy joins the team.

During the Men from N.O.W.H.E.R.E. and Pentagon saga, Dorothy is kidnapped and taken to the Ant Farm, a prison beneath the Pentagon. After escaping the Ant Farm, Dorothy is haunted by the Candlemaker, who attempts to manipulate her into releasing him. Dorothy collapses from the strain the Candlemaker puts on her mind. When Joshua Clay tries to find Chief and the head of the Doom Patrol for help, he is shot and killed by the Candlemaker.

The Candlemaker proceeds to behead the Chief and destroy Cliff Steele's human brain to use his artificial body. Cliff's brain is copied onto a floppy disk and inserted into a blank robot body by Willoughby Kipling. Danny the Street takes Cliff, Dorothy, and Kipling to New York City, which has been devastated by the Candlemaker. Only children, lunatics, and those sensitive to the astral plane are able to see what the Candlemaker is doing to the city. He is destroying the world's soul, or anima mundi, instead of the world itself.

The group is joined by Crazy Jane and Rebis, fellow members of the Doom Patrol. The Candlemaker kills Rebis and tosses Jane into a vortex. Cliff, enraged at the loss of Jane, attempts to kill the Candlemaker, but is ripped apart. Rebis resurrects themselves in a new body after hatching from an egg that Kipling recovered and attacks the Candlemaker, who is reduced to a single flame that Dorothy extinguishes.

After the Doom Patrol disbands, Dorothy is haunted by African spirits who try to draw her to their world. Her attempts to stop the spirits lead to the reformation of the Doom Patrol. Dorothy eventually suffers a panic attack, causing a psychic explosion that kills Coagula and leaves herself comatose. Robotman attempts to keep Dorothy alive, but is convinced to take her off life support.

Following The New 52 continuity reboot, Dorothy appears alive in DC Pride 2022. Dorothy is retroactively established to be dead in the series Unstoppable Doom Patrol, where General Immortus uses her corpse to summon the Candlemaker.

== Powers and abilities ==
Dorothy's power enables her to bring imaginary beings to life. These beings can survive as long as Dorothy is alive. Dorothy's powers also enable her to summon real beings from other planes of existence.

== Her imaginary friends ==
The list of her imaginary friends is as follows:

- Damn All – Made of a newspaper crossword puzzle and financial reports with multiple eyes and a big smile.
- Darling-Come-Home – Damn All's wife. She wears an apron and has the head of a lightbulb.
- Flying Robert – A flying ghost baby with a one eyed balloon for a head and the son of Damn All. A reference to a poem in Der Struwwelpeter by Heinrich Hoffmann.
- The Inky Boys – Three people made up of ink. Another reference to Der Struwwelpeter, specifically the poem 'Die Geschichte von den schwarzen Buben'.
- Pretty Miss Dot – Has lipstick fingers, a helmet over her head covered with lips and curlers, a sweater with a big "D" on it, and shoes that have skulls stitched into them.
- Vegans – Three rhyming girls in tribal masks with deer legs who can-can.
- Paddle the Sky – A dark swirling mass of hands with paddles.
- Dark as the Morning – A shadowy, eyeless smoke being with a mouth filled with fangs.
- Heart-of-Ice – A blue skinned woman who is made of and can generate ice.
- A false Robotman – Thought he was the real Robotman.
- Jolly Hangar – A humanoid figure made up of coat hangers.
- A false Joshua Clay – Complete with chest wound and rotting flesh.
- A false Niles Caulder
- Honey Pie – Made up of a beehive with branches for arms and legs and a honey pot for a head.
- Spinner – Spinner was actually a member of the Doom Force, a one-shot special that Grant Morrison wrote which was a cross between the Doom Patrol and X-Force. She appeared in the imaginary version of the Doom Patrol Dorothy summoned to protect her.
- Polly Polly Tinker Boy
- Cowboy Doll Bookface – A cowboy-like being with a book for a face and a body made of dolls.
- Rockabye Baby – A baby made of rocks that throws rocks.
- Baby Twig Lady – A young girl covered in leaves and twigs, who uses leaves as a weapon.
- All-The-Time-In-The-World – Has spoons for arms, a globe for a head, and clocks for eyes. Wears a crown and a dress.
- Moonface Lightfoot – A two-legged smiling crescent moon.
- Mister Right-and-Cool - A slim and shirtless young man with dark hair and leather trousers. Dorothy created him to be a boyfriend for Pretty Miss Dot.
- The Candlemaker – An egregore/gestalt being representing the world's fear of nuclear holocaust.

== In other media ==
- Dorothy Spinner makes a cameo appearance in the Batman: The Brave and the Bold episode "The Last Patrol!" as an attraction at a freak show.
- Dorothy Spinner appears in Doom Patrol, portrayed by an uncredited actress in the first season and Abigail Monterey in the second season. Dorothy's imaginary friends also appear, with Darling-Come-Home portrayed by Vanessa Cater and voiced by Kat Cressida, Candlemaker voiced by Lex Lang, and series-original character, the giant spider Herschel, voiced by Brian T. Stevenson. This version is the daughter of the Chief and a primitive woman named Slava, with her appearance resulting from her heritage instead of a facial deformity. Dorothy's connection to the Chief motivates him to cause the tragedies that create the Doom Patrol, hoping to extend his life to protect her.
