= Shrapnel (DC Comics) =

- Shrapnel as depicted in Who's Who in the DC Universe #13 (October 1991). Art by Erik Larsen (penciller/inker) and Tom McCraw (colorist).

Publication information
- Publisher: DC Comics
- First appearance: Doom Patrol vol. 2 #7 (April 1988)
- Created by: Paul Kupperberg; Erik Larsen

In-story information
- Alter ego: Mark Scheffer
- Species: Metahuman
- Team affiliations: Secret Society of Super Villains; Cyborg Revenge Squad
- Abilities: Superhuman strength and durability; Metallic body that can be projected into explosive bursts

Shrapnel (Mark Scheffer) is a supervillain appearing in American comic books published by DC Comics, primarily as an enemy of the Outsiders and the Doom Patrol.

Shrapnel has appeared in Batman: The Brave and the Bold and the second season of Arrow, voiced by Greg Ellis in the former and portrayed by Sean Maher in the latter.

== Publication history ==
Shrapnel first appeared in Doom Patrol vol. 2, #7 and was created by Paul Kupperberg and Erik Larsen.

== Fictional character biography ==
Little about Shrapnel's past and identity is known, although it is known that his name is Mark Scheffer and that he has an ex-wife and two daughters. Shrapnel has tried to stay incognito, but failed to do so after deciding to kill anyone who caught even a glimpse of him.

Shrapnel is discovered by the Doom Patrol in Kansas while on a murder spree and forced into combat by the team. Celsius quickly floods Shrapnel, encasing him within a block of ice. He blows the ice apart, hitting Celsius point blank and causing her to be hospitalized. Tempest realizes that Shrapnel is composed of organic cells creating a single consciousness that feeds on the blood of victims.

Shrapnel later joins the Secret Society of Super Villains and the Cyborg Revenge Squad. He is among the villains exiled to another planet in Salvation Run.

== Powers and abilities ==
Shrapnel possesses organic metal skin that gives him superhuman strength and durability. The scales that compose his body can be projected as explosive bursts and remotely controlled.

== Other versions ==
Shrapnel appears in JLA/Avengers.

== In other media ==
- Shrapnel appears in the Batman: The Brave and the Bold episode "When OMAC Attacks!", voiced by Greg Ellis. This version is General Kafka, a Russian war criminal who claims to have hailed from a poor village that was razed during an unspecified conflict, which doomed the survivors to poverty and famine, and seeks revenge for this. Equinox manipulates him into fighting OMAC and attempting to cause a meltdown in New York City, during which Kafka is transformed into an organic metal being with the ability to absorb kinetic energy to empower himself amidst a lab accident. With Batman's help, OMAC defeats Shrapnel by tricking him into tiring himself out.
- Mark "Shrapnel" Scheffer appears in Arrow, portrayed by Sean Maher. This version is a human anti-government serial bomber and member of a terrorist militia group. After bombing two government buildings in Starling City, Scheffer targets Sebastian Blood's Unity Rally, but is thwarted and captured by the Arrow. In the episode "Suicide Squad", Scheffer reluctantly joins the titular team before Amanda Waller kills him for attempting to escape.
- Shrapnel appears as a character summon in Scribblenauts Unmasked: A DC Comics Adventure.
