= Freak (comics) =

Freak, in comics, may refer to:

- A member of DC Comic's Doom Patrol
- Freak (Image Comics), an enemy of Spawn
- Freak (Marvel Comics), the name of three Marvel Comics characters
- Freaks (manga), a 2002 Japanese comics series
- Freex, a 1993 Malibu Comics series

== See also ==
- Freak (disambiguation)
