= Animal-Vegetable-Mineral Man =

DC Comics villain

- Animal-Vegetable-Mineral Man, from Doom Patrol #89. Art by Bob Brown.

Publication information
- Publisher: DC Comics
- First appearance: Doom Patrol #89 (August 1964)
- Created by: Arnold Drake (writer); Bruno Premiani (artist)

In-story information
- Alter ego: Sven Larsen
- Species: Metahuman
- Place of origin: Earth
- Team affiliations: Front Men
- Notable aliases: AVM-Man
- Abilities: Chimeric shapeshifting; High intelligence

Animal-Vegetable-Mineral Man (Sven Larsen) is a fictional character appearing in American comic books published by DC Comics. He is a foe of the original Doom Patrol whose name is derived from the antiquated concept of the animal, vegetable, and mineral kingdoms in Linnaean taxonomy.

The character appears in Doom Patrol (2019), portrayed by Alec Mapa.

== Publication history ==
Animal-Vegetable-Mineral Man first appeared in Doom Patrol #89 (August 1964) and was created by Arnold Drake and Bruno Premiani.

== Fictional character biography ==
Sven Larsen is a Swedish scientist and a former student of Niles Caulder, with whom he had a falling out after Larsen accused Caulder of stealing his idea for the anti-decay ray. Larsen gains his superpowers after falling into a vat of amino acids. This gave him the right arm and leg of a plant, a left arm and leg made of diamonds, and a half-torso of a Tyrannosaurus, with half of his human head shown to be fused with part of the Tyrannosaurus' neck. He uses his powers to get revenge on Caulder and his Doom Patrol. The Doom Patrol defeat Larsen and are able to remove his powers. He later regains them and fights the Doom Patrol again.

Larsen returns to face the second incarnation of the Doom Patrol in Doom Patrol (vol. 2) #15 (December 1988) and #16 (Winter 1988), in partnership with General Immortus. He is defeated after Celsius encases him in ice.

In the twelfth issue of the series, Larsen is now a member of the Front Men, a team of super-powered guards working for Mister Somebody Enterprises. His team is working to discredit the Doom Patrol, having been coached in various ways on how to make the heroes look bad for the cameras. Unknown to the Front Men, Mister Somebody has rigged their uniforms to deliver fatal blows in ways that make it seem as if the Doom Patrol killed them intentionally.

In 2011, "The New 52" rebooted the DC universe. Animal-Vegetable-Mineral Man is re-introduced as part of an experimental security measure that Niles Caulder unleashes on intruders when his underground complex is breached.

In "Doomsday Clock", Animal-Vegetable-Mineral Man is listed as a member of the Doomed, India's sanctioned superhero team. As part of the group, he gains a reputation for eating their foes.

== Powers and abilities ==
Animal-Vegetable-Mineral Man can change any part of his body into animal, vegetable, or mineral forms, as well as combining several more at once. In most appearances, he possesses extensive knowledge of biology.

== In other media ==
=== Television ===
- Animal-Vegetable-Mineral Man appears in the Batman: The Brave and the Bold episode "The Last Patrol!", voiced by Dee Bradley Baker.
- Animal-Vegetable-Mineral Man appears in Doom Patrol, portrayed by Alec Mapa. This version is a tourist named Steven Larson who travels to Paraguay in the hopes of receiving magnetic feet from Nazi scientist Heinrich Von Fuchs, only to accidentally remain in his machine for too long and transform into Animal-Vegetable-Mineral Man. Following this, Larson becomes a bumbling supervillain known for a disastrous convenience store robbery, a subsequent arrest, and a failed assassination attempt on his life carried out by an admirer of Von Fuchs before writing the best-selling autobiography My Side.
- Animal-Vegetable-Mineral Man makes a non-speaking cameo appearance in the Creature Commandos episode "Cheers to the Tin Man" as an inmate of Belle Reve Penitentiary.

=== Miscellaneous ===
- Animal-Vegetable-Mineral Man appears in Teen Titans Go!.
- Animal-Vegetable-Mineral Man makes a cameo appearance in Batman: The Brave and the Bold #7.
