= Flex Mentallo =

- Cover to Flex Mentallo #1. Art by Frank Quitely.

Publication information
- Publisher: DC Comics
- First appearance: Doom Patrol #35 (August 1990)
- Created by: Grant Morrison; Richard Case

In-story information
- Full name: Flex Mentallo
- Species: Metahuman
- Team affiliations: Doom Patrol
- Abilities: Flexing muscles can alter reality

Flex Mentallo is a fictional character appearing in American comic books published by DC Comics. Created by writer Grant Morrison and artist Richard Case in 1990, during their run on Doom Patrol, Flex is in part a parody of Charles Atlas' long-running "The Insult that made a Man out of Mac" advertisements seen in American comics from the past.

In 1996, Flex Mentallo appeared in a self-titled, four-issue miniseries written by Morrison and illustrated by Frank Quitely. The miniseries forms part of what Morrison calls a thematic hypersigil trilogy along with The Invisibles and The Filth.

Mentallo appears in his first live-action adaptation on the Doom Patrol television series for DC Universe and HBO Max, portrayed by Devan Chandler Long.

== Publication history ==
Flex Mentallo first appeared in 1991 in issue #35 of Grant Morrison's run on Doom Patrol as a member of the audience for Danny the Street's Perpetual Cabaret. Later in the storyline, Flex reveals that he is actually "The Man of Muscle Mystery", and tidies his appearance. In issue #42, Flex is revealed to be not an entirely original creation, but rather a parody of the post-workout protagonist of Charles Atlas' long-running "The Insult that made a Man out of Mac" advertisements seen in American comics from the past.

Also parodied was My Greatest Adventure, the title in which the Doom Patrol originally appeared. Part of a long string of fictional characters "come to life" in Morrison's writing, Flex was apparently created by a psychic child with a green pen. The characters created in this child's youthful scrawlings, titled "My Greenest Adventure", apparently came to life. Amongst Flex's "Greenest Adventure" siblings were the villainous Waxworker and the heroic Fact.

In 1996, Flex Mentallo received his own four-issue mini-series written by Morrison and illustrated by Frank Quitely. Although ignored by the Charles Atlas company at the time, it was later brought to the company's attention by a fan of the comics. Charles Atlas company president Jeffrey C. Hogue was unhappy with its likeness being used this way, and filed a trademark infringement suit against DC Comics. DC submitted a motion for summary dismissal, which was granted on the basis of fair use using the parody defense.

DC has reprinted Flex's initial appearances, including the Charles Atlas parody, in the third and fourth collections of the Morrison Doom Patrol stories, "'Down Paradise Way" and "Musclebound". In 2012, DC reprinted the miniseries in a hardcover edition with bonus material. The miniseries had previously been reprinted in Italian by Italian publisher Magic Press.

== Fictional character biography ==
Flex made his first appearance in Doom Patrol #36, where he appeared as a shaggy amnesiac on Danny the Street. When the false Men from N.O.W.H.E.R.E., controlled by a fanatic named Darren Jones, tried to destroy Danny the Street, the Doom Patrol came in to try and put a stop to it. Seeing them battle was what gave Flex his memory back. His origin story was given in Musclebound.

When Flex was still a "mac" instead of a "man", he was bullied a lot while on the beach. Tired of being scrawny, he was approached by a man who had a TV for a head and smoked three cigarinos at a time. He gave Flex a coupon to fill out to get a body building book, "Muscle Mystery for You". The instructions in the book turned Flex into the muscled strongman he is now, and he learned that when he flexed one type of muscle, he could alter reality. As he did, his "Hero Halo" appeared over him, which read "Hero of the Beach". After this, he decided to become a crimefighter and dressed in wrestling boots and leopard-skin trunks.

Flex teamed up with a group of heroes, the Zipper, the Atomic Pile, Dr. 45 and his assistant Romantic Rick, and the Fact. Strangely enough, he hinted, all their adventures revolved around the color green.

In 1956, while judging a swimsuit competition, Flex fell in love with and later married a woman named Dolores Watson. He was then approached by a reporter named Norman Grindstone, who was investigating the disappearance of detective Harry Christmas. Harry was "on to something big", as Norman put it, involving the Pentagon, a rash of 32 mysterious disappearances since 1949, silver sugar tongs, and an Ant Farm. Norman found Harry's conclusion about what was going on, and showed it to Flex. Both were horrified by Harry's discoveries. Soon after, Norman Grindstone was seemingly erased from existence. For two months Flex flexed about every muscle in his body trying to turn the Pentagon into a circle. Dolores left him in this time because he wouldn't stop flexing. He failed, and investigated the Pentagon up close. He was captured, however, by the (real) Men from N.O.W.H.E.R.E. and placed inside the Tearoom of Despair. Once there, he lost his powers and his memory, and was left to wander, homeless and crazy, until he found Danny the Street.

Flex eventually remembered the 32 disappearances; their number, he said, was 5, the number of sides of the Pentagon: "3+2=5 and that is their number. It is the number of anguish". After regaining his memory, he was reunited with Dolores, who returned his costume but then withered away; her parting words were "I love you. They made me". As she said this, the Men from N.O.W.H.E.R.E. suddenly stood in her place. They kidnapped Flex and young psychic Dorothy Spinner, bringing the two to the sub-sub basement of the Pentagon, to power the mechanical monstrosity Flex had discovered all those years ago: The Ant Farm.

While given a tour of the Ant Farm by the demented Major Honey, Flex learned that he was created by a psychic named Wallace Sage inside a comic book Sage created with green ink when he was a child called "My Greenest Adventure". Sage, along with Dorothy, was kidnapped as a means to summon the Telephone Avatar, a being that has enslaved the dead and haunted the telephone system for 50 years. The Doom Patrol soon invaded the Pentagon in an attempt to rescue Flex and Dorothy; in the confusion, Flex freed Wallace, who died within minutes. Upon Wallace's death, Flex regained his powers and successfully transformed the Pentagon into a circle, but he couldn't destroy the Avatar. The Avatar was eventually destroyed by The Candlemaker, an entity that had been imprisoned within Dorothy's mind.

Flex went on to star in a four-issue miniseries in its own continuity.

Flex Mentallo joins up with Doom Patrol later, helping them solve problems in the realm that is deep inside Danny. In return, the Patrol helps him with Muscle Beach, which had been over-run by bullies.

== Powers and abilities ==
As The Man of Muscle Mystery, Flex Mentallo's powers are apparently vast but ill-defined. In a general sense, Flex can affect reality by flexing his muscles, in a reverse form of mind over matter. In the most extreme exertion of his power, he was able to transform the Pentagon into a circular building for a brief moment.

When Flex uses his power, his "Hero Halo", a shimmering projection of the words "Hero of the Beach", appears above his head.

== In other media ==
- Flex Mentallo makes a cameo appearance on a poster in the Batman: The Brave and the Bold episode "The Last Patrol!".
- Flex Mentallo makes a cameo appearance in a magazine in the Young Justice episode "Away Mission".
- Flex Mentallo appears in Doom Patrol, portrayed by Devan Chandler Long. This version was previously captured by the Bureau of Normalcy in 1964 before being rescued by the Doom Patrol in the present day.
