= Mentallo (disambiguation) =

Mentallo is a Marvel Comics character.

Mentallo may also refer to:

- Flex Mentallo, a DC Comics character
- Mentallo and the Fixer, an American industrial music band

== See also ==
- Metallo, a DC Comics character
