= Reactron =

DC Comics supervillain

- Reactron as depicted in Supergirl vol. 5 #26 (April 2008). Art by Drew Johnson and Lee Ferguson (pencillers), Ray Snyder and Marc Deering (inkers), and Brad Anderson (colorist).

Publication information
- Publisher: DC Comics
- First appearance: The Daring New Adventures of Supergirl #8 (June 1983)
- Created by: Paul Kupperberg (writer); Carmine Infantino (artist)

In-story information
- Alter ego: Benjamin K. Krullen
- Species: Metahuman
- Place of origin: Earth
- Team affiliations: Suicide Squad; Nuclear Legion
- Abilities: Superhuman strength, stamina and durability Flight; Nuclear blasts Body generates lethal radiation

Reactron (Benjamin Krullen) is a supervillain who appears in comic books published by DC Comics, usually as an adversary of Supergirl.

== Publication history ==
Reactron first appeared in The Daring New Adventures of Supergirl #8 (June 1983), in a story written by Paul Kupperberg and drawn by Carmine Infantino.

== Fictional character biography ==
=== Pre-Crisis ===
Reactron as depicted in his early appearances.

Benjamin Krullen is a sergeant serving in the US Army during the Vietnam War, alongside Joshua Clay. When Krullen massacres the inhabitants of a Vietnamese village, the shock triggers the activation of Clay's metahuman powers. Clay seemingly destroys Krullen with his energy blasts, then goes AWOL.

Krullen, instead of being killed, is transformed into a being capable of generating radioactive energy and concussive blasts. Calling himself Reactron, the Living Reactor, he surfaces years later and attacks the Doom Patrol, then later fights Supergirl.

=== Post-Crisis ===
Reactron's origin and background are altered following the 1985 Crisis on Infinite Earths continuity reboot. he faces the Doom Patrol and Power Girl in his first appearance. Most of his pre-Crisis continuity is intact, but it is now said that his previous battles involved Power Girl instead of Supergirl. Seemingly destroyed after overloading on Negative Woman's energy, Reactron resurfaces unharmed as a member of the Suicide Squad.

Reactron, redesigned with a Gold Kryptonite heart, wreaks havoc alongside Metallo during the "New Krypton" storyline.

Reactron reappears in the Superman: New Krypton storyline with a new costume and abilities. He is recruited by Sam Lane, equipped with a gold kryptonite heart, and partnered with Metallo. Reactron and Metallo attack the city of New Krypton, where Reactron kills Zor-El. Shortly afterward, Reactron kills himself, causing a chain reaction that destroys New Krypton and kills most of its inhabitants.

== Powers and abilities ==
Reactron is a metahuman with the ability to generate nuclear radiation and concussive blasts. Reactron is also equipped with a gold kryptonite heart, which allows him to briefly remove the powers of Kryptonians.

== In other media ==
Reactron appears in the Supergirl episode "Fight or Flight", portrayed by Chris Browning. This version is Ben Krull, a former nuclear engineer who was exposed to radiation amidst a terrorist attack that Superman thwarted, during which Ben's wife Alyssa died. Blaming Superman for her death, Ben built an advanced biomedical exo-suit that grants super-strength, the ability to fly, and fire energy blasts. In pursuit of his revenge, he attacks Supergirl, only to be defeated by her and arrested.
