= Danny the Street =

Comics character

Publication information
- Publisher: DC Comics
- First appearance: Doom Patrol (vol. 2) #35 (August 1990)
- Created by: Grant Morrison; Richard Case

In-story information
- Alter ego: Danny King
- Species: Sentient street
- Team affiliations: Doom Patrol; Teen Titans
- Notable aliases: Danny the World; Danny the Brick; Danny the Island; Danny the Alley; Danny the Ambulance; Dannyland
- Abilities: Teleportation; Molecular reconstruction

Danny the Street is a fictional character appearing in American comic books published by DC Comics. Danny is a living and sentient piece of urban geography who can magically and seamlessly place himself in any urban landscape at will without any disruption to his surroundings. He can freely interact with any other sapient being through various forms of visual printing within his proximity.

The character was created by Grant Morrison and Richard Case and first appeared in Doom Patrol #35 (August 1990). Morrison's character was described as a transvestite male – though the term has since been outdated as it is offensive to those who identify as transgender. Danny is a cross-dressing male – or a male who presents as feminine – a street with macho establishments like a gun shop, a hardware store and an Army/Navy store, but elaborately decorated with frills, flowers and fairy lights. Danny communicated through text on signs, in a "camp" lingo studded with Polari phrases. His name is a pun on drag queen Danny La Rue, as la rue is French for 'the street'. This has been discussed as part of Morrison's intention to "deconstruct notions of heroic masculinity" in Doom Patrol.

Danny the Street appeared on the first three seasons of the Doom Patrol television series for DC Universe and HBO Max, portrayed as genderqueer, using they/them pronouns. Critics have remarked on the positive portrayal of a non-binary character in a superhero show as emotionally fulfilling for viewers who identify as queer.

== Fictional character biography ==
Danny is a stretch of roadway that has long served as a home and haven for the strange, outcast and dispossessed. He possesses superpowers, including the ability to teleport by integrating into a city's geography; roads and buildings simply make room for him. He does this mostly at night, when no one is looking. Danny travels the globe, and sometimes beyond, happily seeking out people and communities in need of shelter, safety and community. Thus, it is possible to turn a corner on the way to work, and find oneself walking down Danny's roadway. Danny once teleported into the City Under The Pentagon and can teleport into the wilderness when needed.

Danny's flamboyant personality and propensity for cross-dressing is evidenced when he lines his street with typically masculine stores (e.g. gun shops and sporting goods stores) decorated with frilly pink curtains and lace. Danny speaks by altering his form. For example, he communicates with signs in his windows, messages on typewriters, and with letters formed from manhole vapor or broken glass shards. Danny speaks English, heavily flavored with Polari, a largely antiquated form of slang spoken among certain British subcultures, including some of the LGBTQ community. Bona to vada ("Good to see you") is his favorite way of greeting friends. His personality is based, at least partially, on Irish drag performer Danny La Rue. Danny is kind, compassionate, quick to joke and slow to anger. If pushed past his limits, however, he can even the score by manipulating his environment.

Danny first came in contact with the Doom Patrol when he and his residents were attacked by Darren Jones and the Men from N.O.W.H.E.R.E. Jones' obsession with normalcy and with enforcing his "1950s sit-com" worldview, made Danny an obvious target. The struggle took Danny to downtown New York City, where the Doom Patrol investigated the disturbance. They worked hard to protect Danny and his residents, but it was ultimately the members of Danny the Street's Perpetual Cabaret who defeated Jones. In addition to the Doom Patrol and the Perpetual Cabaret, Danny housed Flex Mentallo, protecting the hero during the mental breakdown that followed his first and only failure.

=== Evolution ===
Eventually, Danny the Street left the DC Universe, and inhabited an alternate Earth. Pledging to protect and nurture the needy of all dimensions, he became Danny the World. Danny's friend, former Doom Patrol member Crazy Jane, later became a resident of Danny the World.

In the pages of Teen Titans, during the One Year Later time-shift event in the DC Universe, a portal to Danny was seen in Dayton Manor; Crazy Jane was also seen through the portal.

Danny was leveled in Doom Patrol (vol. 5) #7 by Mister Somebody Enterprises. Crazy Jane managed to escape the destruction and fled to Oolong Island, carrying with her a brick taken from one of Danny's buildings which contained Danny's sentience – effectively making him Danny the Brick.

=== The New 52 ===
In "The New 52" reboot of DC's continuity, Danny is re-introduced in Teen Titans (vol. 4) #3 (January 2012). He becomes a full member of the team and as a teenager himself, spies for Red Robin.

During the crossover event "The Culling", Danny is presumed dead by the group. They find that he did not die and is on a mysterious island with them in Teen Titans (vol. 4) #10, but he later dies during the strain of returning the rest of the group to civilization. It was suggested that he survived as "Danny the Alley".

=== DC Rebirth ===
Danny appears in "DC Rebirth" in Gerard Way's iteration of the Doom Patrol. It is revealed that Danny has reverted to Danny the Brick and is now only able to make words appear on his surface. Danny the Brick tours the universe, carried by Crazy Jane. The two then meet a man named "D" who uses Danny to kill a god. After this, Danny becomes Danny the World. However, he does not pick up outcasts and instead creates his own citizens.

Danny eventually gains enough strength to become an otherworldly amusement park called Dannyland and manifests comic book character Casey Brinke into reality. Danny later contacts Casey because the Vectra led by Casey's father Torminox are hunting him, an evil alien race that wants to use Danny to make meat for fast food restaurants, and wants her to reassemble the Doom Patrol. He contacts Space Case by becoming Danny the Ambulance. Casey and the Doom Patrol save Danny the World and defeat Torminox and the Vectra. Afterwards, Danny becomes a member of the new team.

== Development ==
In a 2020 interview, Morrison said that they understand why Danny is a popular character on the Doom Patrol television series,

Because Danny the Street was always popular. Back in the day when he was created in the late 1980s, we didn't have terms like 'genderqueer' or 'non-binary', they just didn't exist. There were no names, and I think that it's really good now that characters like that can show up and be slotted into the world we live in. Suddenly, Danny's genderqueer, and it makes more sense. It has something to say to the society that we're living in now – where people in the margins have been able to get into the center of it more. I'm pleased with characters like that, which seemed really bizarre and were, in a lot of ways, seen as unacceptable back in the day, and we couldn't even describe what we were doing. Those characters have come into a flourishing progression because of that.

== Powers and abilities ==
Danny the Street can teleport. He is a living pocket dimension that can incorporate more and more space as he gains more residents. He can create any conceivable thing (living or inanimate) as long as he has the strength.

While Danny is acting as Danny the Ambulance, he still runs Danny the World.

== In other media ==
- Danny the Street, Danny the Brick, and Danny the Ambulance appear in Doom Patrol (2019). This version is a fugitive from the Bureau of Normalcy.
- Danny the Street appears in the Teen Titans Go! episode "Stickiest Situation", voiced by Peter Rida Michail. This version is capable of speech and moving parts of the street he inhabits like body parts.
- Danny the Street appears as a character summon in Scribblenauts Unmasked: A DC Comics Adventure.
