= General Zahl =

Publication information
- Publisher: DC Comics
- First appearance: Doom Patrol #121 (October 1968)
- Created by: Bruno Premiani; Murray Boltinoff

In-story information
- Notable aliases: Captain Zahl
- Abilities: Military training

General Zahl is a fictional character who appears in American comic books published by DC Comics. Initially known as Captain Zahl, he is a former German Navy officer and enemy of the Doom Patrol.

== Publication history ==
General Zahl first appeared in Doom Patrol #121 (October 1968), and was created by Bruno Premiani and Murray Boltinoff.

== Fictional character biography ==
During World War II, Captain Zahl was an officer in the German Navy and commanded a U-boat. As a U-boat captain, Zahl was ruthless and effective, achieving the highest kill number of any commander in the German fleet. After his boat was sank by bombs developed by Niles Caulder, Zahl was crippled and forced to wear a neck brace.

After the end of World War II, Zahl works as a mercenary until a conflict with the Doom Patrol forces him to retire. Zahl (now calling himself "General Zahl") assists Madame Rouge in battling the Doom Patrol, who sacrifice themselves to save the village of Codsville.

Years later, the Teen Titans, together with Robotman, track down Zahl and Rouge during their attempted takeover of Zandia. With the help of Changeling, the Titans put a stop to the villains' plans. Zahl fires at Robotman, but is killed after the bullets bounce off Robotman and strike him.

== Powers and abilities ==
Despite possessing no superhuman abilities, Zahl is a skilled military commander.

== In other media ==
General Zahl appears in the Batman: The Brave and the Bold episode "The Last Patrol!", voiced by Corey Burton. This version caused the Doom Patrol to disband and retire years prior after they failed to stop him from killing a hostage.
