= Crazy Jane =

- Crazy Jane as depicted on the cover of Doom Patrol (vol. 2) #63 (January 1993)

Publication information
- Publisher: DC Comics
- First appearance: Doom Patrol (vol. 2) #19 (February 1989)
- Created by: Grant Morrison (writer); Richard Case (artist)

In-story information
- Full name: Kay Challis (legal name)
- Species: Metahuman
- Team affiliations: Doom Patrol
- Notable aliases: Various, see Alters
- Abilities: Various, see Alters

Crazy Jane (legal name: Kay Challis) is a superhero appearing in American comic books published by DC Comics. Created by writer Grant Morrison and artist Richard Case, the character first appeared in Doom Patrol (vol. 2) #19 (February 1989), which was published by the DC imprint Vertigo Comics. She has dissociative identity disorder as a result of childhood trauma, and each one of her 64 alternate personalities, or "alters", has a unique superhuman ability. According to the afterword in the first trade paperback collection of Morrison's run on Doom Patrol, she was based on Truddi Chase's autobiography, When Rabbit Howls, which Morrison had been reading while creating the series.

Jane is portrayed by Diane Guerrero in the TV series Doom Patrol on Max along with Skye Roberts portraying Kay Challis.

== Fictional character biography ==
Crazy Jane is the current dominant alter, or host, of Kay Challis's system (used to refer to every alter as a collective). Kay, as a result of repeated childhood trauma and abuse, developed dissociative identity disorder.

Beginning at only five years old, Kay was continuously abused by her father. The first time this happens, she is putting a jigsaw puzzle together; this becomes an important symbol in her future. As the abuse continues, Kay withdraws and goes dormant, retreating to her unconscious. Her role as host is then taken over by an alter called Miranda. One Easter Sunday while at church, Miranda is raped, which triggers several flashbacks to her former abuse. This causes Miranda to become dormant and create many more alters. She is committed to a mental institution soon after. After the Dominators detonate their gene bomb on Earth, Jane and her alters are affected and each gain a different power.

Cliff Steele (Robotman) suffers several losses due to this bomb, which killed many of his Doom Patrol teammates. While staying in the same institution as Jane, Will Magnus asks Cliff to look after her, which leads to Jane joining the Doom Patrol.

Jane makes a pilgrimage back to her childhood home, facing her own traumas and overcoming them. This brings peace to her inner turmoil, causing her and her alters to come to an understanding and live in cooperation.

== Alters ==
Crazy Jane's alters are organized in a mental subway grid called "the Underground", their headspace. Each alter has their own "station", which appears to serve as home when they are not in control. In the lower section of the Underground is a well where the alters can go to destroy themselves. This is where Miranda was "killed". The deepest part of the Underground houses Daddy, an alter who resembles Jane's father.

- Baby Doll: A telekinetic child-like alter who believes everything is lovely. She is said to be one of the few alters who trust men.
- Baby Harlot: An integration of Baby Doll and Scarlet Harlot.
- Biker Girl: A rebellious biker who loves to live life off the edge. She possesses superhuman speed and is an expert biker.
- Bizzie Lizzie Borden: Borden is able to generate razor-sharp blades. Her name is a reference to Lizzie Borden.
- Black Annis: An aggressive alter with sharp claws, red eyes, and blue skin. She is a misandrist and never lets any men pass her to protect the system.
- Blood of the Lamb: In this form, her body is covered head to toe in blood coming from unknown (or nonexistent) wounds remembering the incident at the church.
- Bubble: Bubble spawned as a coping mechanism, but is now just a frantic persona wandering around the Underground.
- Butterfly Baby: Constantly suffers pain on a Hellraiser-like level in the deepest part of the mind.
- Chainsaw Nun: A Catholic nun who wields a chainsaw.
- Crazy Jane: The dominant alter or "host". She possesses no apparent powers aside from longevity. Her name is derived from that of a character in several poems by William Butler Yeats, as well as the eponymous painting by Richard Dadd.
- Daddy: An introject of Jane's father, who manifests as a giant monster made of insects and puzzle pieces. It resided in a mental representation of the Well before being destroyed.
- Dr. Harrison: Harrison is a businesswoman who can telepathically detect the trauma of others and influence anyone who hears her voice. Mr. Nobody describes her as insane, cold, calculating, and not to be trusted.
- Driller Bill: A dark-skinned woman in a worker's jumpsuit with a black and yellow beanie. She is arguably as aggressive as Hammerhead, yet fond of Baby Doll and her antics.
- Driver 8: The conductor of the Underground subway, named after the R.E.M. song. The Driver's hat has an infinity symbol on it.
- Flaming Katy: One of the "protector" alters, protecting Jane whenever she feels threatened. Very antisocial and dangerous, someone who does not like to be interrogated. She is a woman made of living fire, who is pyrokinetic and can fly.
- Flit: A girl dressed in late 1980s fashion. She can teleport anywhere and constantly uses her powers to travel around, as she does not like standing still.
- Hammerhead: Another protector like Flaming Katy. She is highly aggressive and possesses superhuman strength and durability. In the Underground, she is bald and wears a leather jacket with a winged skull on her chest.
- Jack Straw: A mute gentle scarecrow who sits on the train not really doing much.
- Jeann: Another worker at the Underground with a black cloth on his neck revealing his suicidal thoughts.
- Jill-in-Irons: She is wrapped in large chains. A reference to Jack-In-Irons.
- Karen: A perky but unstable alter with the power to cast "love spells." She primarily takes control when Jane is severely depressed.
- K-5: The original host, Kay Challis, who vanished at age 5. She is dormant in one of the lower stations of the Underground.
- Kit W'the Candlestick: An old woman who carries a burned-out candle.
- Lady Purple: A mysterious cloaked woman with precognition.
- Liza Radley: A stable, more "normal" appearing alter, awakened as a result of a loving environment, who pushes Jane to recovery. She claims she is the new and better "Miranda". Other personalities do not know how to react to Liza and often feel threatened by her.
- Lucy Fugue: She has radioactive bones and see-through skin. She can also generate harmonic vibrations, a power she used to defeat the Antigod. In the Underground, Fugue appears as an Asian woman with blue-streaked hair.
- Merry Andrew: Dresses as a Harlequin and carries toys.
- Miranda: The former host who took over after Kay went dormant, she destroys herself after the church incident. Her "station" is occupied by an indescribable horror, visible from a distance only as a light.
- No One: An aggressive, yet shy persona created after Kay was told she was not good enough.
- Penny Farthing: A Victorian woman who stutters a lot.
- Pepper's Ghost: He is a mysterious and aesthetic personality.
- Pretty Polly: Named after the folk song, she wears a black Victorian dress and has X's carved into her eyes with an unremarkable personality.
- Rain Brain: He speaks in a stream of consciousness and can take on an immaterial astral projection.
- Scarlet Harlot: A nymphomaniac who can create ectoplasm projections and absorb stray psychosexual energy.
- Sex Bomb: She explodes when sexually aroused.
- Shy: A cyclops who has the power to look into a person's mind and read their memory. She hides her face in her hands because of her scary appearance.
- Silver Tongue: Her vocalizations materialize in silver font, and can be used as bladed weapons.
- Spinning Jenny: Prone to panic attacks. Her panic attacks can cause sonic screams which make her targets' ears bleed.
- Stigmata: She bleeds from her hands and feet and relives the church incident endlessly.
- Sun Daddy: A gigantic figure with a sun for a head with the power to throw fireballs.
- Sylvia: She bears Jane's feelings of claustrophobia. She is locked inside of a small room, reciting poem fragments. She believes if she can put the fragments together, she can use them as a key out of the room. Sylvia speaks in poetic dark rhythm with a spooky voice when surfaced.
- The Balladeer: After the apparent deaths of Baby Doll and Flaming Katy, she becomes a mourner to sing the ballad and led a funeral procession to the well. Her station is located in the deepest parts of the Underground.
- The Chief: A mysterious new alter who leads the Doom Patrol after Niles Caulder retires. The Chief was introduced in the 2023 series Unstoppable Doom Patrol.
- The Engineer: He assists Driver 8 in maintaining the Underground.
- The Hangman's Beautiful Daughter: A calm artist, who can interact to her paintings. Her name is taken from the title of an album by the Incredible String Band. She resembles Frida Kahlo.
- The Pointman: He assists Driver 8 in maintaining the Underground.
- The Secretary: A neat and orderly pessimist who rarely shows emotion. Her job is to perform tasks (such as filling, sorting, fixing, building and assemble, cleaning, etc.) much faster than others are capable of doing.
- The Shapeless Children: Constantly repeats "Daddy don' do it". They are made to constantly relive the trauma of Kay in the deepest part of the Underground.
- The Signal-Man: Another railroad-themed alter who helps maintain the Underground order.
- The Sin-Eater: She believes she must suffer for her sins. Jane brings her out as a defense when being tortured.
- The Snow Queen: She has the power to create and shape ice.
- The Wall Crawler: The Wall Crawler is able to scale walls and ceilings, no matter how rough or smooth they are. She has only been seen in one of the videotapes of Caulder's interviews.
- The Weird Sisters: A three-in-one alter similar to the Three Witches.

== In other media ==
- Kay Challis / Jane appears in Doom Patrol, portrayed primarily by Diane Guerrero, Skye Roberts as a child, and Leela Owen as a teenager. In the Underground, "Black Annis" is performed by Helen Abell, Hammerhead is portrayed by Stephanie Czajkowski, Lucy Fugue is portrayed by Tara Lee, Penny Farthing is portrayed by Anna Lore, Pretty Polly is portrayed by Hannah Alline, Silver Tongue is portrayed by Chelsea Alana Rivera, the Secretary is portrayed by Jackie Goldston, Driller Bill is portrayed by Shay Mack, Baby Doll is portrayed by Sarah Borne, the Weird Sisters are voiced and motion-captured by Monica Louwerens, Daddy is portrayed by David A. MacDonald, Balladeer is portrayed by Ana Aguilar, Miranda is portrayed by Samantha Marie Ware, and Mama Pentecost is portrayed by Va Liu. This version of Jane is the "designated driver" alter out of the 64 other alters, who prefer if she stays in control while they keep to themselves. In the second season, Daddy impersonates Miranda in a failed attempt to gain control of the body. In the third season, Jane looks after Kay when her body starts to mature. In the fourth season, the alters integrate to become Kaleidoscope, help the Doom Patrol defeat Immortus, leave for outer space, and enter a relationship with Space Case.
  - Jane makes a cameo appearance in "Crisis on Infinite Earths" via archive footage of a deleted scene from the first season.

== See also ==
- Legion, a Marvel Comics character with superpowers and dissociative identity disorder.
- Stephanie Maas / Critical Mass, a character from the comic book series Rising Stars with superpowers and two "personalities".
- Hulk, his dissociative identity disorder gives him different Hulk forms
- Kevin Wendell Crumb of the 2016 film Split who possesses 23 "personalities" and powers.
- Moon Knight, another Marvel Comics character with supernatural superpowers and dissociative identity disorder, among other mental illnesses, who operates as a vigilante.
- Typhoid Mary, another Marvel Comics character with dissociative identity disorder, who operates as a supervillain / antihero.
- Two-Face (Harvey Dent), a DC Comics character with dissociative identity disorder.
