= Doom Patrol =

Group of fictional characters

- Cover of Doom Patrol: Weight of the Worlds #1 (September 2019), depicting the seventh roster of the Doom Patrol: (clockwise from top) Lucius Reynolds, Crazy Jane, Robotman's head, Negative Man, Lotion the Cat, Elasti-Girl, Flex Mentallo, Casey Brinke, and Fugg. Art by Nick Derington.

Publication information
- Publisher: DC Comics
- First appearance: My Greatest Adventure #80 (June 1963)
- Created by: Arnold Drake; Bob Haney; Bruno Premiani

In-story information
- Base(s): Former: Midway City HQ; Kansas City HQ; Secret Sanctuary; Rainbow Estates, Violet Valley; Bruno's nightclub; Key Mordaz; Dayton Manor; Oolong Island; Dannyland; The Shelter
- Member(s): Chief; Negative Man; Robotman; Elasti-Girl; Mento; Beast Boy; Dorothy Spinner; Crazy Jane; Flex Mentallo; Danny the Street; Beast Girl; Degenerate

Roster

The Doom Patrol is a superhero team appearing in American comic books published by DC Comics. The original Doom Patrol first appeared in My Greatest Adventure #80 (June 1963), and was created by writers Arnold Drake and Bob Haney, along with artist Bruno Premiani. Doom Patrol has appeared in different incarnations in multiple comics, and have been adapted to other media. The series' creator suspected that Marvel Comics copied the basic concept to create the X-Men, which debuted a few months later.

Doom Patrol is a group of super-powered misfits whose "gifts" caused them alienation and trauma. Dubbed the "world's strangest heroes" by editor Murray Boltinoff, the original team included the Chief (Niles Caulder), Robotman (Cliff Steele), Elasti-Girl (Rita Farr), and Negative Man (Larry Trainor); Mento (Steve Dayton) and Beast Boy (Garfield Logan) joined soon after. The team remained the featured characters of My Greatest Adventure, which was re-titled Doom Patrol as of issue #86 (March 1964). The original series was canceled in 1968 when Drake killed the team off in issue #121, last of that series, (September–October 1968). The team did not return until 1987, after writer Paul Kupperberg killed most of the new team during the Invasion! event. Beginning with issue #19 of the second volume of Doom Patrol, Scottish comic writer Grant Morrison transformed the title into a much more surreal and bizarre story that explored topics of mental health, gender identity, and sexual discovery in an abstract manner. Morrison's run garnered critical acclaim, and the mature themes of their stories led to the comic being integrated into Vertigo Comics.

== Publication history ==
=== My Greatest Adventure: Doom Patrol (volume 1) ===
Cover to My Greatest Adventure #80 (June 1963), the first appearance of the Doom Patrol, with art by Bruno Premiani

Doom Patrol first appeared in 1963, when the DC title My Greatest Adventure, an adventure anthology, was being converted to a superhero format. The task, assigned to writer Arnold Drake, was to create a team that fit both of these formats. With fellow writer Bob Haney and artist Bruno Premiani, he created Doom Patrol, a team of super-powered misfits who were regarded as freaks by the world at large. According to Drake, editor Murray Boltinoff told him My Greatest Adventure was in danger of cancellation and he wanted him to create a new feature which might save it. Boltinoff was enthusiastic about Drake's initial pitch with Elasti-Girl and Automaton (changed to Robotman by the team's third appearance, issue #82), but Drake wanted a third character and enlisted Haney's help in coming up with Negative Man. The team was initially announced as "The Legion of the Strange".

Doom Patrol were announced on the cover art of My Greatest Adventure #80 (cover dated June 1963). Drake and Haney devised the plot for the issue together, and then each scripted half the issue independently (Drake the first half, Haney the second). Niles Caulder motivated the original Doom Patrol, bitter from being isolated from the world, to use their powers for the greater good. My Greatest Adventure was officially retitled The Doom Patrol beginning with issue #86.

In an interview, Drake discussed the conception of Doom Patrol.

Murray Boltinoff the editor, came to me one day, or I went to him one day and he said, "We're having a lot of trouble with My Greatest Adventure, it's starting to lay an egg. The era of the superhero has taken over completely. My Greatest Adventure has ordinary heroes. We need some kind of superhero to punch it up." So I said okay, went out and came back a couple of hours later with the basic idea about the man in the wheelchair who is the great brain, and runs this group of superheroes who hate being superheroes. That was the new aspect. That was the thing that made Doom Patrol different, these people hated being superheroes. And they were a little bit self-pitying, just a little bit, and the chief was constantly telling them, "Stop crying in your beer." That made them something that wasn't around at the time.

The members of the Doom Patrol often quarrelled and had personal problems, something that was already common among superhero teams published by Marvel Comics such as Fantastic Four, but was novel among the DC lineup. Doom Patrol's rogues gallery matched the strange, weird tone of the series. Villains included the immortality-seeking General Immortus, the shape-shifting Animal-Vegetable-Mineral Man, and the Brotherhood of Evil led by the Brain, a disembodied brain kept alive by technology. The Brotherhood of Evil also included the intelligent gorilla Monsieur Mallah and Madame Rouge, who was given powers similar to those of Elongated Man, with the extra attribute of a malleable face, allowing her to impersonate various people.

Cover to Doom Patrol #121 (September–October 1968), the last original issue of the series, with art by Joe Orlando

The Doom Patrol had two crossovers: one with the Challengers of the Unknown, teaming up to fight Multi-Man and Multi-Woman; and second with the Flash in The Brave and the Bold #65.

As the popularity of the book waned, the publisher cancelled it. Drake killed off the entire Doom Patrol in the final issue, Doom Patrol #121 (September–October 1968) where Doom Patrol sacrificed their lives to Madame Rouge and General Zahl to save the small fishing village of Codsville, Maine. This was the first time in comic book history that a cancelled title was concluded with the death of its cast. Artist Bruno Premiani and editor Murray Boltinoff appeared at the beginning and the end of the story, asking fans to write to DC to resurrect Doom Patrol, although the latter was supposed to have been Arnold Drake. According to the writer, he was replaced with the editor because he had just resigned over a pay dispute and moved to Marvel Comics. He finished the script only out of friendship for Boltinoff. A few years later, three more issues appeared, reprints of earlier issues (#89, #95 and #90 appeared as #122, #123 and #124 respectively). A proper Doom Patrol revival did not occur until 1977, nine years after the original's demise.

Some similarities exist between the original Doom Patrol and Marvel Comics' original X-Men; Marvel acknowledged the similarity in its humor title Not Brand Echh. Both include misfit superheroes shunned by society and both are led by men of preternatural intelligence who use wheelchairs. These similarities ultimately led series writer Arnold Drake to argue that the concept of the X-Men must have been based on the Doom Patrol.

Drake stated:

...I've become more and more convinced that [Stan Lee] knowingly stole The X-Men from The Doom Patrol. Over the years I learned that an awful lot of writers and artists were working surreptitiously between [Marvel and DC]. Therefore from when I first brought the idea into [DC editor] Murray Boltinoff's office, it would've been easy for someone to walk over and hear that [I was] working on a story about a bunch of reluctant superheroes who are led by a man in a wheelchair. So over the years, I began to feel that Stan had more lead time than I realized. He may well have had four, five, or even six months.

In an interview shortly before his death in 2007, Drake took a more moderate position, stating that while it is possible Lee took his ideas from Doom Patrol, he could also have arrived at a similar concept independently: "Since we were working in the same vineyards, and if you do enough of that stuff, sooner or later, you will kind of look like you are imitating each other."

The four lead characters of the original series have much in common with the members of the Fantastic Four. Both teams, composed of a woman and three men, have one member with stretching powers, another with great strength trapped in a distorted or inhuman orange body, and a third whose form seems ablaze with fire or energy. One can extend the comparison by saying that the fourth member is either invisible or behind the scenes. This has inspired fan speculation that the Doom Patrol was inspired by, or imitative of, the earlier series. John Byrne, who has written and drawn all three sets of characters, has written that "I wish someone would ask Arnold Drake about the Doom Patrol's similarities with the Fantastic Four, instead of always bringing up the X-Men comparison."

The respected comic book and television writer, Mark Evanier, disagrees. He notes that the time period between release dates of My Greatest Adventure #80 (June 1963) and The X-Men #1 (September 1963) was too short for the necessary production time window to produce an imitation comic book series. Furthermore, Evanier noted that there would be no point to attempt such a rushed production to imitate a property that had no guarantee of success prominent enough to justify such efforts: "It was probably a good six months before any reliable sales figures on My Greatest Adventure #80 were known. No one even started tallying them until the issue went off-sale…in this case, two months later." As it was, sales ultimately proved mediocre for the original concept, so imitating it would have been pointless.

=== Showcase: Paul Kupperberg's Doom Patrol ===
Writer Paul Kupperberg, a longtime Doom Patrol fan, and artist Joe Staton introduced a new team in Showcase #94 (August–September 1977). DC was then lining up features for the Showcase revival—the series was initially an anthology that would debut new characters who could springboard into their own series if they proved sufficiently popular, and Showcase #94 was the first new issue of the series in almost seven years. Editor Paul Levitz instructed Kupperberg and Staton to do a Doom Patrol feature. Kupperberg opted to create a new lineup because he wanted to respect the story in which the Doom Patrol met their deaths, and was inspired by Len Wein and Dave Cockrum's then-recent "all-new, all-different X-Men". Kupperberg has since said he is not proud of the reboot, remarking that "[I was] missing the point of the Doom Patrol. The original group were outsiders and freaks, while my new guys were just comic-book superheroes. I was young and inexperienced and new to writing, with about two years under my belt before getting the gig."

The new team is led by Celsius (Arani Desai), the Chief's previously unseen wife, who recreates the Doom Patrol to protect herself from General Immortus. Robotman is the only survivor of the original Doom Patrol, and his ruined body is replaced by a new, futuristic one built by Will Magnus. The Negative Spirit possesses Russian cosmonaut Valentina Vostok, making her Negative Woman (although its presence does not render her radioactive), and she is able to transform her own body into its form rather than sending it out under control. The final member is Tempest aka Joshua Clay, a Vietnam veteran/deserter who fires energy blasts from his hands.

This new version of the team did not receive its own series following its three-issue tryout. Kupperberg said this was most likely due to poor sales, as even in the months prior to the DC Implosion he heard no word of a new Doom Patrol series. However, the team did receive a series of guest appearances in various DC titles, such as Superman Family (in a three part arc in the Supergirl feature that was intended for the recently canceled Super-Team Family), DC Comics Presents (teaming up with Superman in a story which revealed that Vostok's powers had changed to match Larry Trainor's exactly), and Supergirl. Robotman also appeared as an occasional supporting character in the Marv Wolfman and George Pérez era of Teen Titans, where it was revealed that Changeling, formerly DP associate Beast Boy, had arranged for Dayton Industries technicians to recreate the Caulder body design for Cliff. His first storyline here had him, the Titans, and a new Brotherhood of Evil battle Madame Rouge and General Zahl, the murderers of the original Doom Patrol, who died in the battle.

Eclipse Comics published Doom Patrol: The Official Index with covers drawn by John Byrne in 1984. The two-part series included all of their appearances from My Greatest Adventure #80 to their final appearance before their 1980s return.

=== Post-Crisis relaunch (volume 2, part 1) ===
Kupperberg's enthusiasm for the Doom Patrol remained, and in addition to writing some of the team's post-Showcase appearances, he eventually wrote a proposal for a new Doom Patrol series. The proposal was green-lit, and Kupperberg laid the groundwork for the new series by writing the John Byrne-illustrated Secret Origins Annual #1, published in 1987, which recapped the origins of the two iterations of the Doom Patrol that had existed thus far. In October 1987, DC relaunched Doom Patrol, written by Kupperberg and illustrated by Steve Lightle. Lightle took on the assignment with reluctance, having read and disliked Kupperberg's new Doom Patrol in Showcase #94–96, and soon quit due to several grievances, such as not being involved in plotting the comic despite the editor repeatedly promising that he would be. He was replaced by Erik Larsen after issue #5. Kupperberg later commented, "I like Erik's work, but I don't think he was exactly right for the Doom Patrol. To tell the truth, I don't think either Erik or myself were happy with the arrangement, but we did our best to make it work." For his part, Larsen said he was perfectly happy on the series, in part because on the few occasions where he disliked an aspect of Kupperberg's plots, he would simply revise the plot when he drew the issue. In retrospect, Larsen felt that this practice was overstepping his bounds, but said the editor never objected to it.

This incarnation was a more conventional superhero series than the original volume. It included new members who were hired to the team: the magnetically empowered strong-girl Lodestone (Rhea Jones); Karma (Wayne Hawking), whose psychic power make anyone trying to attack him fall over themselves; and Scorch (Scott Fischer), whose body generates phenomenal quantities of heat focused through his hands, requiring him to wear protective gloves at all times. A DC Comics Bonus Book appeared in issue #9 (June 1988). According to Kupperberg, sales on the series "started out okay, and descended to the point where I was removed from the book and replaced by Grant Morrison in the hopes he could salvage the title."

=== Grant Morrison's Doom Patrol (volume 2, part 2) ===
After the first 18 issues (and various crossovers and annuals), Kupperberg was replaced by Grant Morrison and the comic was no longer submitted to the CCA for approval (relieving the stories and images depicted of several constraints), starting with issue #19. Kupperberg agreed to help Morrison by writing out characters Morrison did not want to use, including Celsius, Scott Fischer, Karma, Lodestone, and Tempest.

Morrison used DC's Invasion crossover to restart the book by "stripping the team down to its roots and returning, as quickly as possible, to the freewheeling weirdness that made the early stories so exhilarating." Morrison substantially retooled Negative Man by forcibly merging the Negative Spirit (now a cosmic entity) with Larry Trainor and his doctor Eleanor Poole, creating an agender gestalt entity known as Rebis. Morrison introduced some new characters to the team, including Crazy Jane, who had 64 personalities (each with its own metahuman ability), sentient neighborhood Danny the Street, and Dorothy Spinner, an ape-faced girl with the ability to summon her imaginary friends into reality. They incorporated bizarre secret societies, elements of Dada, surrealism, and the cut-up technique pioneered by William S. Burroughs and Brion Gysin. They also borrowed the ideas of Jorge Luis Borges and Heinrich Hoffmann. The original creator, Arnold Drake, said Morrison's was the only subsequent run to reflect the intent of the original series.

Cover of Doom Force one-shot, parody of X-Force. Art by Keith Giffen and Mike Mignola.

Over the course of the series, Morrison dedicated some issues to parody and homage. Willoughby Kipling led the Doom Patrol on a parody of the Brujería story arc of Swamp Thing: A Murder of Crows in issues #31–32. Issue #42 featured the origin of Flex Mentallo, who was supposed to be the character in the Charles Atlas ad. A belated lawsuit from the Charles Atlas Company showed that DC was protected under Fair Use doctrine in addition to an expired statute of limitations. Issue #53 featured a dream sequence that mimicked the Stan Lee/Jack Kirby Fantastic Four, borrowing plot points from "The Galactus Trilogy" (FF #48–50) and FF #51, "This Man... This Monster!". A 1992 special called Doom Force was released as a one-shot and was meant to mimic and parody the X-Force book by Rob Liefeld. Issue #45 parodied Marvel's Punisher and Alan Moore in a satire called the Beard Hunter, a perpetually clean-shaven serial killer who murders bearded men and targets the Chief.

Morrison's villains were extremely unusual and strange, even by Doom Patrol's eccentric standards. For example:

- Red Jack is a near-omnipotent being who thinks he is both Jack the Ripper and God. He lives in a house without windows, torturing butterflies to create the pain he needs to survive.
- The Brotherhood of Dada are an anarchistic group who fight against reality and reason. It features members such as Sleepwalk, who can only use her tremendous powers when asleep (she takes sleeping pills and listens to Barry Manilow before battles), The Quiz, who has "every superpower you hadn't thought of" and a pathological fear of dirt, and Number None, who never materializes but is responsible for everyday annoyances, like bumping into doors that are ajar.
- The Scissormen, a race of alien beings from the dimension of Orqwith that attack non-fictional beings in the "real world" (i.e., the world the Doom Patrol live in) with their large scissor-like hands and cut people out of reality.

In issue #57, it was revealed that the Chief had secretly caused the "accidents" which turned Cliff, Larry Trainor, and Rita Farr into super beings. Chief stated he caused them to gain their powers because of his hatred for them. He felt they were spoiled and narcissistic as well as shallow individuals, and that by turning them into "freaks", he could improve them as human beings. He further revealed that he lied about not being married to Celsius (the leader of the second Doom Patrol, who Caulder claimed was insane/lying about being married to him) out of anger. He was upset over how the experiments performed on her (like with Elasti-Girl) only gave her super-powers and did not turn her into a freak. When Tempest and Robotman found out his role in "creating" Robotman, Elasti-Girl, and Negative Man, Tempest was killed and Robotman paralyzed. Having been exposed as a villain, Caulder planned to unleash nanobots into the world, hoping to create a catastrophe that would improve humanity, regardless of the carnage it would cause. Caulder's plan was hijacked by the Candlemaker, a violent cosmic horror who is freed by Dorothy in exchange for his resurrection of Tempest (whom Candlemaker re-killed). Candlemaker decapitates Caulder and sought to use the nanobots to enslave humanity. Dorothy, Crazy Jane, and Robotman (freed by the former two) defeat Candlemaker with help from the new reborn version of Rebis. Rebis briefly leaves the team to reproduce as part of a cosmic ritual. However, during the battle, Jane is sent flying into a portal and lands in a world without heroes, where she is forcibly institutionalized for her mental issues. The final issue of Morrison's run sees Robotman locate Jane as she is about to kill herself and take her to live with Cliff within the confines of Danny the Street. The cycle aptly ends with the words "There is another world... There is a better world... Well there must be", from the song "Asleep" by The Smiths.

A four-issue Flex Mentallo mini-series illustrated by Frank Quitely spun out from this run.

=== Rachel Pollack's Doom Patrol (volume 2, part 3) ===
Morrison left the book with issue #63, and Rachel Pollack took over writing the book the next issue. Pollack's first issue was also the first under the new Vertigo imprint of DC Comics (although the trade paperback editions of Morrison's work do bear the imprint, the original issues did not). Returning characters for Pollack's run included Cliff Steele, Niles Caulder (kept alive by nanobots, but reduced to a disembodied head, usually kept on a tray filled with ice), and Dorothy Spinner. Pollack's run had Dorothy as a primary member of the Patrol; she brought her imaginary friends to her aid in combat. Overall, Pollack's run dealt with issues such as the generation gap, humanity, identity, transgender issues, bisexuality, and borrowed elements from Judaism and Kabbalah in the last few issues. The angel Akatriel is used as a major character in the last seven issues.

The first story arc of her run was called "Sliding in the Wreckage". Cliff's computer brain begins to malfunction, and he regresses into flashbacks from previous storylines. Dorothy is haunted by African spirits while dealing with living alone in the real world. The Chief is given a new body by Will Magnus. However, he rips his head off his body once more, seeking to atone for his sins, and is kept in cryogenic storage. Meanwhile, Earth suffers from random outbreaks of weirdness, contributed by the arrival of something called "The Book of Ice". A government agency known as the Builders, similar to the Men from N.O.W.H.E.R.E., attempt to stop the outbreak, which is apparently linked to a race of shapeshifters known as the Teiresias. As the Chief is kept in a cryogenic state, he appears in the land of the Teiresias as a face carved in a mountain. They warn him that his arrival in this world is causing the craziness in the real world. Throughout the storyline, little people with backward letters for heads had been seen altering people. These people were apparently older version of nanomachines, referred to as "nannos". At the Doom Patrol headquarters, Builder agents attack, and in the craziness, two of the Teiresias approach Dorothy with a new brain for Cliff. However, to insert it, she needed the Chief's expertise. In the Teiresias world, nannos "repaired" the Chief so he could live as a severed head. After his awakening, the craziness seems to stop, and Dorothy, Cliff, and the Chief each realize that they needed to be together.

The team relocated to Violet Valley's Rainbow Estates, a house haunted by ghosts of those who died in sexual accidents. There, three new members join: The Bandage People, George and Marion, who were once two workers for the Builders but managed to escape, and the Inner Child, a manifestation of the ghosts' purity and innocence. Another later newcomer of the team is Kate Godwin, aka Coagula, one of the first transgender superheroes. A one-time ally of the team called the Identity Addict, who could become different superheroes by shedding her skin like a lizard, integrates herself back into the team while using the False Memory identity to change the team's memories until she is kicked out by Dorothy.

Villains that the team fought, besides the Builders, included the Fox and the Crow, two animal spirits whose feud Dorothy and Cliff were subsequently pulled into; the Master Cleaner, a being with a human fetus inside a bubble for a head who began "cleaning" the world by stripping it down to nothing and replacing the stolen items, including people, with a paper ticket; and a group of Hassidic healers who called themselves the False Healers and their leader, the Rabbi of Darkness.

A new artist, Ted McKeever, took over the artwork for most of the final 13 issues. Pollack continued writing the title until its cancellation with issue #87, in February 1995.

=== John Arcudi's Doom Patrol (volume 3) ===
In December 2001, writer John Arcudi and artist Tan Eng Huat launched a new Doom Patrol series. This relaunch was not under the Vertigo imprint and returned the title to the mainstream DC universe. The series lasted for 22 issues before it was cancelled.

Arcudi's run largely ignored Morrison and Pollack's runs at first; Arcudi stated in interviews at the time, that the disconnect with the Vertigo run was due to DC editorial having an agreement in play banning writers from using characters and concepts from his run; most notably Rebis/Negative Man and Crazy Jane. However, due to negative fan response to the run; Arcudi was allowed to make reference to the Vertigo series to explain what had happened to the characters from the Pollack run.

The run featured two Doom Patrols: a corporate run Doom Patrol employed by Thayer Jost for Jost Enterprises featuring existing DC characters (Metamorpho, Elongated Man, the second Doctor Light and Beast Boy) and a second "underground" Doom Patrol, run by Robotman and featuring new characters: Fast Forward, who could look 60 seconds into the future; Kid Slick, who could become entirely frictionless; Fever, who could set herself alight; and Freak, who possessed mysterious powers from a parasitic entity in her soul. The later Doom Patrol were the main characters of the run, with the Jost owned group disbanding when it is revealed by Metamorpho that Robotman had reportedly died four years earlier which results in the 'imposter' Robotman in the team to vanish into nothingness.

The Doom Patrol later rebuild the real Robotman once they recover his head and come to an agreement that Thayer Jost will fund the group so long as Jost has the distributing rights to the Doom Patrol, which he uses to create a Doom Patrol TV series based on the Silver Age yeam. Over the course of the run, Fast Forward loses control of his powers when he tries to look beyond 60 seconds into the future and has to suppress them with medicine to function, while Kid Slick and Fever start a relationship with one another despite the latter accidentally hospitalising the former with her powers. It is later revealed that part of Robotman's agreement with Jost involves Jost funding for Dorothy Spinner's healthcare as she has been in a coma for the last four years, Cliff deduces that the 'imposter' Robotman was an imaginary Cliff that Dorothy had subconsciously manifested.

Visiting Dorothy, Cliff regained his lost memories about how Dorothy became comatose. Deciding to end the Doom Patrol, Coagula and Cliff take Dorothy to Kentucky to meet her previously unknown birth mother to offer Dorothy a chance at a more 'normal' life. However, fearing that Coagula and Cliff were abandoning her, Dorothy had an explosive psychic outburst that apparently kills Coagula and Cliff and leaves herself comatose. After finding out that Dorothy is brain dead, Cliff gives doctors permission to turn off her life support. The death of Dorothy ends Robotman's contract with Jost, resulting in Fast Forward, Fever, Kid Slick and Freak being evicted and striking out together with royalty money that Jost gave them from his Doom Patrol TV series, while Cliff sets off into the world once again alone.

Arcudi's characters have made few subsequent appearances, mainly constituting cameos.

=== John Byrne's Doom Patrol (volume 4) ===
In August 2004, DC launched a new Doom Patrol series after the new team debuted in JLA. John Byrne wrote and illustrated this series, with inks by Doug Hazlewood. Touted as "Together again for the first time!", Byrne rebooted the series, eliminating all previous Doom Patrol continuity.

The series debuted as part of a six-part storyline that ran in JLA #94–99 as "The Tenth Circle", though Byrne only drew this arc as it was written by Chris Claremont. This team introduced several new members such as Ava, Grunt, Nudge, and Vortex alongside the 1960s heroes.

This reboot was both controversial and short-lived. Besides the removal of the popular Morrison run and its characters from canon and the butterfly effect it had on the Teen Titans (which did its best to limit references to Beast Boy's past and avoided using the Brotherhood of Evil until the Byrne run was canceled and Geoff Johns could restore the previous lore), the series garnered controversy over a scene where Robotman and Elasti-Girl are sent back in time and inhabit their younger selves' bodies. During their time in the past, Robotman declares his love for Elasti-Girl. However, due to an age gap between the two heroes, Rita is trapped in her twelve-year-old self's body when the adult Cliff reveals his romantic feelings and kisses her. DC canceled Byrne's series with issue #18.

=== "Infinite Crisis" and "One Year Later" ===
DC editorial used the events of the "Infinite Crisis" storyline to restore the Doom Patrol's continuity. In escaping from the paradise dimension they had inhabited since the end of Crisis on Infinite Earths, Superboy-Prime and Alex Luthor created temporal ripples which spread throughout reality, causing overlaps on parallel timelines of certain events (Hypertime), such as restoring Jason Todd to life.

In the reprinted edition of Infinite Crisis, additional scenes added to the collection showed Fever, Kid Slick, Ava, Nudge, Grunt, and Vortex among a two-page spread of heroes.

While assisting the Teen Titans in battling Superboy-Prime, members of the Doom Patrol had flashbacks to their original history. Robotman and Niles Caulder regained memories of the previous Doom Patrol teams with which they had worked. This battle apparently undid some of Superboy-Prime's timeline changes and resulted in a timeline incorporating all previous incarnations of the Doom Patrol, but with Rita Farr and Larry Trainor still alive. The Chief confirmed that Rita was indeed killed by Zahl's explosion. The Chief claimed that he later found her skull and treated it with synthetic proteins until her malleable body was regrown from it.

Steve Dayton is again using the Mento helmet and he is mentally unstable; however, he remembers his time as the villainous Crime Lord. The Chief appears to be manipulating the Doom Patrol members once again; he claims to wish to return them to normal so "maybe one day [they] won't be freaks anymore". After the Doom Patrol encounters the Titans, the Chief tells them that Kid Devil should be a member of the Doom Patrol instead of the Titans, since his unique appearance and nature will always separate him from others. However, Beast Boy, Elasti-Girl, and Mento all stand up to the Chief and force him to step down as the Doom Patrol's leader, with Mento taking over that role.

Two former members of the Teen Titans were dramatically altered during the course of the "Infinite Crisis". Mal Duncan, now code-named Vox, and his wife Karen Beecher (Bumblebee) now reside in the Doom Patrol's castle headquarters.

The Doom Patrol later appear in The Four Horsemen series (2007), with Caulder back in charge. According to Titans (vol. 2) #1, Beast Boy had become the team leader.

In DC Universe: Decisions, Robotman has a supporting role while Mento appears in issue #4.

=== Keith Giffen's Doom Patrol (volume 5) ===
On February 7, 2009, it was announced at the New York Comic Con that Keith Giffen would be spearheading a revival of Doom Patrol, a title which he has long said he wanted to write. He was joined by artist Matt Clark, who has also long expressed a desire to work on the team. The new series focused on the core members Elasti-Girl, Negative Man, Robotman, and the Chief, while other members such as Mento, Bumblebee, and Vox were to be seen later. The title launched with a 10-page ongoing Metal Men co-feature written by J. M. DeMatteis.

In the first issue, Rita takes on the alias "Elasti-Woman", and according to the team shrink, she is "mothering" Bumblebee, who was shrunk to the size of a bee in Infinite Crisis.

Nudge, Byrne's addition to the team, was killed in the line of duty and Grunt took off with her corpse.

The team works out of Oolong Island, an island previously inhabited by mad scientists which has been turned into a resort town while maintaining a scientific background. The Challengers of the Unknown's Rocky Davis is also working closely with the team for spiritual support.

Former member Crazy Jane appears in issue #7. Danny the Street, in a reduced aspect, appears in issue #8.

Ambush Bug joined the team at the end of issue #9.

The series was canceled, due to a decrease in sales, with issue #22 in May 2011.

=== The New 52 ===
In September 2011, The New 52 rebooted DC's continuity. In this new timeline, the Doom Patrol is briefly mentioned in issue #24 of Justice League. The team is depicted to be identical in appearance to Paul Kupperberg's 1977 Doom Patrol, consisting of members Celsius, Joshua Clay, and Negative Woman, with additional members Karma and Scott Fischer.

During the "Forever Evil" storyline, Valentina Vostok, Karma, and Scott are killed during a confrontation with Johnny Quick and Atomica of the Crime Syndicate, while Celsius and Joshua Clay are presumably killed. Upon learning of his team's demise, the Chief sets about assembling a new Doom Patrol.

Following the defeat of the Crime Syndicate, the newly created Doom Patrol is introduced in issue #30 of Justice League. The team includes Robotman, Elasti-Girl, Negative Man and M.I.A. Justice League member Element Woman, whom Caulder refuses to let leave the group and tricks into thinking she was abandoned by the Justice League.

The team attempt to capture Jessica Cruz, the new Power Ring, to force her to join the team. During their attempt to capture her, Caulder demands the team refuse to save civilians in a collapsing building to allow him to lobotomize Cruz and force her to serve him. The Justice League save the people in the building and Lex Luthor manages to hold Caulder back so Batman can convince Cruz to go with the League instead. During their fight, Luthor reveals that Caulder (as he did in the Morrison run) was responsible for causing the "accidents" that gave the Doom Patrol their powers and that both Celsius and Joshua Clay used the chaos of the events of Forever Evil to fake their deaths and escape from Caulder. It is also revealed that Caulder poisoned an entire fishing village as part of an experiment, and cured the residents only after Luthor discovered the truth and threatened to expose him.

=== Gerard Way's Doom Patrol (volume 6) ===
A new Doom Patrol series written by Gerard Way and drawn by Nick Derington was created as part of the Young Animal imprint. The first issue was published on September 14, 2016. The series has created a multitude of original characters as well as some taken from former team rosters.

Casey Brinke, a fictional character that Danny the Street created to communicate with people through comic books, is contacted by Danny when he is threatened by a group of aliens known as Vectra. They wish to profit from his power to create life by turning his fictional people into cheap meat at a fast food restaurant. Danny reaches out to Casey, hoping that she could find and join the Doom Patrol after explaining her origin story, both the fictional origin story he had created for her and how she had become a real person.

Casey agreed to help. She pilots Danny, currently taking the form of an ambulance, into his attackers' headquarters, discovering that the leader of the organization is her father Torminox, accidentally brought into reality when Vectra tortured Danny. Alongside Torminox is an evil version of Casey, known as Doodle Bug. She was also created when Danny was tortured and reflects his concern regarding how Casey would become in the real world. Despite the family drama, Casey and the Doom Patrol defeat Vectra and free Danny from Vectra's clutches.

Afterward, the team sets out to find Crazy Jane, who is running a cult under the influence of her current dominant ego Dr. Harrison. Harrison wishes to purge the 63 other personalities within Jane's mind by distributing them among the mind-controlled cult members using a gene bomb. After the process, she would kill them all. Jane and the team manage to stop this plan and save the cult members while also killing the Dr. Harrison personality.

The team is contacted by Niles Caulder in a later issue and embark on a mission with him leading. The mission goes haywire and it is revealed that Caulder is gambling again, leading the team to evict him as a leader and as a member of the team. This marks the team embracing being a new iteration of the Doom Patrol.

Other characters introduced in Way's run included Terry None, Casey's roommate, eventually revealed to be Mr. Nobody's daughter; Lotion, Casey's cat, who Terry mutated into an anthropomorphic form; and the Reynolds family (paramedic Sam, his wife Valerie, and their magic-wielding son Lucius). This series ran 12 issues.

First published in July 2019, Doom Patrol: Weight of the Worlds retained the oversight of Gerard Way's Young Animal imprint, and directly continued from the ending of Volume 6. The series saw the return of Elasti-Girl and Mento to the team and a brief appearance of Beast Boy. The plot primarily concerned Cliff Steele acquiring a new robot body that was ever upgrading to the point that he became an entire planet in an attempt to protect the universe from hurt, motivated by his mother disowning him and the loss of Dorothy Spinner. Cliff was eventually persuaded to stop by Crazy Jane, who helped to deconstruct him into an infantile form. The series was cancelled in October 2019 and ended with its seventh issue in July 2020.

=== Infinite Frontier ===
Following the cancellation of their series, Robotman, Elasti-Girl, and Negative Man were reintroduced to the main DC continuity, alongside Niles Caulder, in issue #1 of Batman/Superman: World's Finest. The team helped the titular superheroes defeat Metallo and later performed surgery on Superman to cure him of red kryptonite poisoning.

=== Unstoppable Doom Patrol (volume 7) ===
The seven-issue Unstoppable Doom Patrol series by writer Dennis Culver, artist Chris Burnham, and colorist Brian Reber launched March 28, 2023. It portrayed the Doom Patrol with a new mission: saving, protecting and training metahumans. The series' primary team consists of Robotman, Negative Man, Elasti-Woman, and led by a new personality of Crazy Jane calling herself "The Chief". New team members include Degenerate (a metahuman with the ability to gain strength from negative emotions) and Beast Girl (a metahuman with an animalistic appearance and the ability to manipulate "primal instincts" in others). Supporting cast include Niles Caulder (no longer leading the team, but advising), Mento, Willoughby Kipling, Lotion, Lucius Reynolds, Flex Mentallo, and new characters Psylosimon (who has fungus-based powers) and Starbro (a metahuman who merged with a Starro spore). This team is pursued by US government forces led by Peacemaker and battles a new version of the Brotherhood of Evil, led by General Immortus, who seeks to gain the power of the Candlemaker.

== Enemies ==
The Doom Patrol faces a diverse array of foes. Each one is listed in alphabetical order with issue and date of their first appearance:

=== Central rogues' gallery ===
| Villain | First appearance | Description |
|---|---|---|
| General Immortus | My Greatest Adventure #80 (June 1963) | Immortal "general" of a cultish criminal syndicate with centuries of knowledge about military tactics. |
| The Brain | Doom Patrol vol. 1 #86 (March 1964) | Disembodied brain of scientific genius, the Brain led the Brotherhood of Evil. |
| Madame Rouge | Doom Patrol vol. 1 #86 (March 1964) | Instructor at a French girls’ school who was secretly the deadly Madame Rouge, with an elastic body and the ability to remold her face to imitate anyone. |
| Monsieur Mallah | Doom Patrol vol. 1 #86 (March 1964) | A gorilla who was chosen by the Brain to be subjected to training and electric shocks that turned him into a genius. |
| Mr. Nobody | Doom Patrol vol. 1 #86 (March 1964; as Mr. Morden); Doom Patrol vol. 2 #26 (September 1989; as Mr. Nobody) | Mr. Morden, a “one-man crime wave”, stole the giant robot Rog in his quest to join the Brotherhood of Evil; driven insane and turned into an abstract shadow form by an ex-Nazi scientist, he gained the power to drain sanity from his victims and rechristened himself Mr. Nobody, leader of the Brotherhood of Dada. |
| Animal-Vegetable-Mineral Man | Doom Patrol vol. 1 #89 (August 1969) | Dr. Sven Larsen, Swedish scientist and former student of the Chief, fell into a vat simulating the organic soup of the primordial Earth and gained power to change his body into any form of animal, vegetable, or mineral. |
| Garguax | Doom Patrol vol. 1 #91 (November 1964) | A mammoth-sized and obese forerunner of an alien invasion force who used the advanced technology of his world, including an android army dubbed the Plastic Men. |
| Mister 104 | Doom Patrol vol. 1 #98 (September 1965) | John Dubrovny was a genius biochemist who suffered a mental collapse and developed the power to transform himself into any element on the atomic table. He started out as Mister 103. Later appearances had John operating as Mister 104 |
| General Zahl | Doom Patrol vol. 1 #121 (October 1968) | Originally called Captain Zahl, the former Nazi U-boat captain was a frequent sparring partner with the Doom Patrol. His most notable claim is his role as the mastermind in the believed demise of the group alongside Madame Rouge. |
| Red Jack | Doom Patrol vol. 2 #23 "The Butterfly Collector" (June 1989) | Arguably the most powerful villain the team has ever encountered, Red Jack was an extra-dimensional being, with a filigree crown and a masquerade-style mask, dressed in mid 17th-century nobleman costume, who claimed to be both Jack the Ripper and the creator of the universe. His powers derived from the collective suffering of millions of butterflies, which he kept pinned to the wall of his home. He kidnapped Rhea Jones (AKA Lodestone) from the hospital where she was being tended to during a coma, in order to make her his bride. Upon discovering Rhea missing from her hospital bed, Crazy Jane reveals the identity of her kidnapper through a divining ritual involving cut up pieces from books she stole from a store down the street (a method purportedly used by Dadaists and William S. Burroughs to create random poetry). Red Jack easily defeats the Doom Patrol, and seems unstoppable until Crazy Jane releases his butterfly collection, rendering him powerless, and allowing Rhea to stab him in the back with his own knife. |
| Shrapnel | Doom Patrol vol. 2 #7 (April 1988) | Mark Scheffer was a serial bomber and anti-government anarchist before a lab accident turned his skin into an organic metal compound giving him superhuman strength, speed, and the ability to manipulate metal projectiles from his body into explosive bursts. He was discovered by the Doom Patrol in Kansas while on a murder spree and forced into combat by the team. |

=== Foes of lesser renown ===
| Villain | First appearance | Description |
|---|---|---|
| Doctor Janus | My Greatest Adventure #81 (March 1964) | Josef Kreutz, a master criminal who was formerly a propagandist for Hitler, escaped the fall of Nazi Germany and invented a radio-like device that made people see things that were not there. |
| The Green-Headed League | My Greatest Adventure #82 (September 1963) | Three green-skinned aliens disguised themselves as human and infiltrated the corridors of power over seven years of planning as Senator Durham, political powerhouse; Dr. Savatini, chairman of the International Science Foundation; and Monsieur Duvoir, famed financier. |
| Cooky and Nolan | My Greatest Adventure #83 (November 1963) | Basic crooks exploiting power outages caused when Negative Man's energy form was unleashed out of control. |
| The Nuclear Beasts | My Greatest Adventure #85 (February 1964) | Two nuclear-powered creatures from the Earth’s core. |
| Rog | Doom Patrol #86 (March 1964) | A giant robot created by Chief that fell under the control of Mr. Nobody so that he can become a member of the Brotherhood of Evil. |
| Giacamo | Doom Patrol #87 (May 1967) | A little person who served the Brotherhood of Evil. |
| Vince Harding | Doom Patrol #87 (May 1964) | Escaped killer who hid on a Pacific island loaded with deadly booby-traps. |
| The Baron | Doom Patrol #88 (June 1964) | Monocle and cape-wearing gentlemanly leader of thieves using advanced technology to execute stylish and daring plans, all in order to seize wealth to be used by General Immortus. |
| S/Sgt. Allen Norton | Doom Patrol #89 (August 1964) | Amnesiac war veteran with post-traumatic stress disorder that turned him violent when he heard sounds reminiscent of machine gun fire. |
| Doctor Tyme | Doom Patrol #92 (December 1964) | Invented the "4-X beam" that slows or accelerates time in localized areas, and which he radiated from the top of his absurd alarm-clock shaped helmet. Hid in "Merlin's Castle," which he decorated with a large number of clocks. |
| Osra | Doom Patrol #94 (March 1965) | Dr. John Radick, author of best-seller “Illusion and Reality,” was secretly the son of Dr. Janus and used Janus’s mental illusion radio to create the belief that Osra, the ghost of an ancient sultan, was destroying buildings. |
| The Claw | Doom Patrol #94 (March 1965) | A hawk-masked thief who controlled super falcons Meena and Tonka, which had steel razor tipped claws and could fly at speeds topping 200 miles per hour. |
| Bug Man | Doom Patrol #99 (November 1965) | Used army of robots and a flying robot vehicle that could transform into simulacra of bugs. |
| King of Dinosaurs | Doom Patrol #100 (December 1965) | Dr. Weir went mad and hypnotized a young green-skinned boy named Craig (secretly Beast Boy) in order to steal his key to a bank deposit box which held Craig's father's secrets of anti-evolution, which he used to engineer dinosaurs he controlled in a series of mad thefts. |
| Nicholas Galtry | Doom Patrol #100 (December 1965) | Garfield Logan's legal guardian, he stole from the boy’s trust and hired Arsenal to kill him to prevent the embezzlement from being discovered. |
| League of Challenger Haters | Challengers of the Unknown #42 | A villain group that usually antagonizes the Challengers of the Unknown. It consists of Multi-Man, Kra, Multi-Woman, and Volcano Man. The Doom Patrol once fought the League of Challenge Haters in Doom Patrol #102 when they tried to find Atlantis causing the Doom Patrol and the Challengers of the Unknown to team up to stop them. |
| King Zatopa | Doom Patrol #102 (March 1966) | Leader of an Atlantean nation that was preserved in suspended animation and revived by Multi-Man and the Challenger-Haters, who held the nation’s queen hostage to force Zatopa and his army to work on their behalf. |
| The Meteor Man | Doom Patrol #103 (May 1966) | Professor Randolph Ormsby, a germ-phobic astronomer, was transformed by cosmic rays into a rampaging living meteor growing ever more powerful as he absorbed iron into his molten core. |
| Ultimax | Doom Patrol #107 (November 1966) | A rampaging giant robot intending to create a world of living computers, who was armed with techniques to neutralize all of the Doom Patrol, including a gas that super-activated Elasti-Girl’s shrinking powers and sent her into a subatomic universe. Ultimately revealed to be a pawn of the Brotherhood of Evil where it was controlled by Brain. |
| Doctor Death | Doom Patrol #107 (November 1966) | A disfigured, skull-faced man named Dr. Drew invented an energy shroud which he intended to use to strangle the planet and destroy all life, until Negative Man thwarted his scheme. He was obsessed with making Negative Man realize he was so freakish that he could work only with a fellow freak like himself. |
| Abu Hallam | Doom Patrol #107 (November 1966) | Abu Hallam, masked like a witch doctor, infiltrated and took over Swiss bank C.G.Y., thwarting Steve Dayton’s attempt to uncover Nicholas Gantry’s financial crimes, until confronted by Steve Dayton and he revealed himself to be Monsieur Mallah in disguise. |
| The Zarakas | Doom Patrol #107 (November 1966) | One of two warring nations in a subatomic world, led by Toxino, the one-eyed king, who was nearly deposed by Count Waja. |
| Mandred the Executioner | Doom Patrol #109 (February 1967) | A powerful entity created by the sacrifice of Garguax’s Plastic Men androids, which threw themselves into a vat to pool themselves into one creature. |
| Zarox-13 | Doom Patrol #111 (May 1967) | Thirteenth leader of Garguax’s alien race, who was revered by the epithets “Master of the Dark Forces, Ruler of the Ruthless, Protector of the Unholy, and Emperor of the Cosmos.” It took the combined forces of the Doom Patrol and the Brotherhood of Evil to stop Zarox-13. |
| Arsenal | Doom Patrol #113 (August 1967) | A large mecha-suit, powered with an arsenal of weapons intended to neutralize the Doom Patrol's powers, operated by a man with dwarfism. His suit would later be used by Nicholas Galtry. |
| Kor, the Conqueror | Doom Patrol #114 (September 1967) | Prof. Anton Koravyk, specialist in sonic technology, attempted to send himself back in time to escape the governments intent on channeling his talents into military uses, but accidentally punched through time and de-evolved himself into a Neanderthal warrior. |
| The Mutant Trio | Doom Patrol #115 (November 1967) | Three telepathically linked flying mutants with three-fingered hands and destructive power. Ur, aka the Mutant Master, whose head is a giant eye, fires a heat beam; his brother Ar, whose face is in the center of his chest, fires a de-atomizer ray; and Ir, a faceless mutant with a giant eye on the palm of each hand, fires lasers. The three claim to be aliens who were deformed by atomic radiation, becoming "the first children of the atomic age". |
| The Black Vulture | Doom Patrol #117 (February 1968) | A man named Decker attempted to swindle a Native American tribe out of its land, calling himself "Son of Geronimo" until the Chief discovered his plot. Decker then sought revenge as the Black Vulture, a bird-costumed man flying by jet-powered gauntlets, wielding steel-claw talons, and controlling a menageries of superpowered birds. |
| Videx | Doom Patrol #118 (March–April 1968) | Jalmar Lichtmeister believed he had uncovered the secret to invisibility and tested his theories on himself, successfully turning his outer skin invisible but revealing his organs and gaining power over light. |
| The Great Guru | Doom Patrol #119 (May–June 1968) | Yaramishi Rama Yogi used radical "therapy" to attempt to emotionally cripple the Doom Patrol in order to distract them while he "liberated" Madame Rouge from her brief romance with the Chief. |
| The Wrecker | Doom Patrol #120 (August 1968) | Harvey Keller, twin brother of artist Morton Keller, was distraught when Morton was killed by a medical error when a hospital data processor mislabeled his blood type. Keller created New World Island, a Sargasso sea in space of satellites and space craft, from which he plotted to use technology destructively in order to wean mankind from his dependence on technology. |
| Kalki | Doom Patrol vol. 2 #1 (October 1987) | An aging mad scientist and the father of Celsius who sought to become immortal and once employed a younger Niles Caulder in his experiments. |
| Reactron | Doom Patrol vol. 2 #10 (July 1988) | A radioactive enemy of Superman who the Doom Patrol once fought. |
| Metallo | Doom Patrol vol. 2 #10 (July 1988) | A cyborg enemy of Superman who once fought the Doom Patrol. |
| Pythia | Doom Patrol vol. 2 #13 (October 1988) | A Lord of Chaos. |
| Scissormen | Doom Patrol vol. 2 #19 (February 1989) | The Scissormen are a race of beings with scissors for hands that come from the metafictional city of Orqwith. |
| Brotherhood of Dada | Doom Patrol vol. 2 #26 (September 1989) | An absurdist group that was created by Mr. Nobody when he was denied membership in the Brotherhood of Evil. |
| Cult of the Unwritten Book | Doom Patrol vol. 2 #31 (April 1990) | A religious order that is dedicated to the total annihilation of the entire universe by summoning the Decreator. |
| Decreator | Doom Patrol vol. 2 #32 (May 1990) | A cosmic entity that is known to eradicate all types of existence. |
| Men from N.O.W.H.E.R.E. | Doom Patrol vol. 2 #35 (August 1990) | An organization that is dedicated to the extermination of eccentricity and difference after their soul husks have been harvested by the Agency and the Telephone Avatar during World War II. They once captured Flex Mentallo and targeted Danny the Street. |
| Darren Jones | Doom Patrol vol. 2 #35 (August 1990) | A man who is completely obsessed with eliminating the strangeness and peculiarity in the world and the self-described poster for normalcy. |
| Beard Hunter | Doom Patrol vol. 2 #45 (June 1992) | Ernest Franklin was a disturbed and closeted gay assassin of bearded men who was hired the Bearded Gentlemen's Club of Metropolis to kill the Chief because he would not sell his beard to them. He cannot grow a beard due to a male hormone deficiency according to his mother when she was visited by the police. |
| Codpiece | Doom Patrol vol. 2 #70 (September 1993) | A villain with a massive inferiority complex who wears a suit that has a codpiece-shaped weapon system. |
| Barrage | Doom Patrol vol. 4 #1 (August 2004) | A villain with energy-projecting abilities. |
| Candlemaker | Doom Patrol vol. 2 #51 (January 1992) | An extradimensional egregore who was unleashed by Dorothy Spinner during the earlier days of the Doom Patrol. |
| Torminox | Doom Patrol vol. 6 #5 (May 2017) | Richard Brinke is a scientist and the father of Casey Brinke who was turned into the evil Torminox by the disease of the same name. He was the villain in the "Space Case" comics where Casey operated as the titular character. Both of them were accidentally brought to life by Danny the Street. |

== Other versions ==
=== Tangent Comics ===
An alternate universe iteration of the Doom Patrol from Earth-9 appear in a self-titled Tangent Comics one-shot, consisting of Doomsday, Star Sapphire, Firehawk, and Rampage. This version of the group come from the year 2030.

=== Just Imagine... ===
An alternate universe iteration of the Doom Patrol appear in Just Imagine..., consisting of Brock Smith / Blockbuster, Lucinda Radama / Parasite, and Deke Durgan / Deathstroke. This version of the group are death row inmates who serve under Reverend Dominic Darrk and his son Adam.

== Collected editions ==
=== My Greatest Adventure/Volume 1 ===
Drake and Premiani's run is available as:

Collections of My Greatest Adventure and Doom Patrol volume 1
| Title | Material collected | Year | ISBN |
|---|---|---|---|
| The Doom Patrol Archives Volume 1 | My Greatest Adventure Vol. 1 #80–85; Doom Patrol Vol. 1 86–89 | 2002 | ISBN 1-56389-795-4 |
| The Doom Patrol Archives Volume 2 | Doom Patrol Vol. 1 #90–97 | 2004 | ISBN 1-4012-0150-4 |
| The Doom Patrol Archives Volume 3 | Doom Patrol Vol. 1 #98–105; Challengers of the Unknown Vol. 1 #48 | 2006 | ISBN 1-4012-0766-9 |
| The Doom Patrol Archives Volume 4 | Doom Patrol Vol. 1 #106–113 | 2007 | ISBN 1-4012-1646-3 |
| The Doom Patrol Archives Volume 5 | Doom Patrol Vol. 1 #114–121 | 2008 | ISBN 978-1-4012-1720-4 |
| Showcase Presents: The Doom Patrol Volume 1 | My Greatest Adventure Vol. 1 #80–85, Doom Patrol Vol. 1 #86–101 | 2009 | ISBN 1-4012-2182-3 |
| Showcase Presents: The Doom Patrol Volume 2 | Doom Patrol Vol. 1 #102–121 | 2010 | ISBN 1-4012-2770-8 |
| Doom Patrol: The Silver Age Omnibus | My Greatest Adventure Vol. 1 #80–85; Doom Patrol Vol. 1 #86–121; The Brave and the Bold Vol. 1 #65; Challengers of the Unknown Vol. 1 #48 | 2017 | ISBN 978-1-4012-7355-2 |
| Doom Patrol The Silver Age Vol. 1 | My Greatest Adventure Vol. 1 #80–85; Doom Patrol Vol. 1 #86–95 | 2018 | ISBN 978-1-4012-8111-3 |
| Doom Patrol The Silver Age Vol. 2 | Doom Patrol Vol. 1 #96–107; Challengers of the Unknown Vol. 1 #48; The Brave and the Bold Vol. 1 #65 | 2020 | ISBN 978-1-77950-098-4 |
| DC Finest: Doom Patrol: The World's Strangest Heroes | My Greatest Adventure Vol. 1 #80–85; Doom Patrol Vol. 1 #86–102; The Brave and the Bold Vol. 1 #65; Challengers of the Unknown Vol. 1 #48; Teen Titans (vol. 1) #6 | 2025 | ISBN 978-1-7995-0035-3 |

Issues #122–124 of Doom Patrol are reprinted material.

=== Volume 2 ===
Collections of Doom Patrol Vol. 2
| Title | Material collected | Year | ISBN |
|---|---|---|---|
| Superman: The Man of Steel Vol. 9 | Superman Vol. 2 #19–22; Adventures of Superman Vol. 1 #441–444 and Superman Annual #2; Doom Patrol Vol. 2 #10 | 2016 | ISBN 978-1-4012-6637-0 |
| DC Through the 80s: The Experiments | Secret Origins #48, The Saga of the Swamp Thing #40, The Sandman #8, Doom Patrol Vol. 2 #25, The Warlord #48 and 55, Legion of Super-Heroes #298, Nathaniel Dusk #1, The Best of DC: Blue Ribbon Digest #58, Watchmen #1, Camelot 3000 #1, The Dark Knight Returns #2, Angel Love #1, History of the DC Universe #1-2 | 2021 | ISBN 978-1-77950-709-9 |
| Doom Patrol: The Bronze Age Omnibus | Showcase Vol. 1 #94-96, DC Comics Presents #52, Daring New Adventures of Supergirl #7-9, Secret Origins Annual #1, Doom Patrol Vol. 2 #1-18, Doom Patrol and Suicide Squad Special #1, Superman Vol. 2 #20, Doom Patrol Annual #1 and stories from The Superman Family #191-193 | 2019 | ISBN 978-1-4012-9883-8 |
| Crawling from the Wreckage | Doom Patrol Vol. 2 #19–25 | 2000 | ISBN 1-56389-034-8 |
| The Painting That Ate Paris | Doom Patrol Vol. 2 #26–34 | 2004 | ISBN 1-4012-0342-6 |
| Down Paradise Way | Doom Patrol Vol. 2 #35–41 | 2005 | ISBN 1-4012-0726-X |
| Musclebound | Doom Patrol Vol. 2 #42–50 | 2006 | ISBN 1-4012-0999-8 |
| Magic Bus | Doom Patrol Vol. 2 #51–57 | 2007 | ISBN 1-4012-1202-6 |
| Planet Love | Doom Patrol Vol. 2 #58–63 and Doom Force #1 | 2008 | ISBN 1-4012-1624-2 |
| Doom Patrol Book One | Doom Patrol Vol. 2 #19–34 | 2016 | ISBN 1-4012-6312-7 |
| Doom Patrol Book Two | Doom Patrol Vol. 2 #35–50 | 2016 | ISBN 1-4012-6379-8 |
| Doom Patrol Book Three | Doom Patrol Vol. 2 #51–63, Doom Force #1 | 2017 | ISBN 1-4012-6597-9 |
| Doom Patrol Omnibus | Doom Patrol Vol. 2 #19–63, Doom Force #1 | 2014 | ISBN 978-1-4012-4562-7 |
| Doom Patrol by Rachel Pollack Omnibus | Doom Patrol Vol. 2 #64-87, Doom Patrol Annual #2, Totems #1, and Vertigo Jam #1. | 2022 | ISBN 978-1-77951-534-6 |
| Flex Mentallo: Man of Muscle Mystery | Flex Mentallo #1–4 | HC: 2012; PB: 2014 | HC: ISBN 978-1-4012-3221-4; PB: ISBN 978-1-4012-4702-7 |

=== Volume 4 ===
Collections of Doom Patrol Vol. 4
| Title | Material collected | Year | ISBN |
|---|---|---|---|
| Doom Patrol by John Byrne: The Complete Series | Doom Patrol Vol. 4 #1-18, JLA #94-99, material from Secret Origins Annual #1, and Superman Vol. 2 #20 | 2020 | ISBN 978-1-77950-084-7 |

=== Volume 5 ===
The Keith Giffen written Doom Patrol has been collected in the following trades:

Collections of Doom Patrol Vol. 5
| Title | Material collected | Year | ISBN |
|---|---|---|---|
| We Who Are About to Die | Doom Patrol vol. 5 #1–6 | 2010 | ISBN 978-1-4012-2751-7 |
| Brotherhood | Doom Patrol vol. 5 #7–13 | 2011 | ISBN 978-1-4012-2998-6 |
| Doom Patrol by Keith Giffen and Matthew Clark Omnibus | Doom Patrol vol. 5 #1–22, Teen Titans vol. 3 #32, #34-37, The Brave and the Bold vol. 3 #8, Secret Six vol. 3 #3-4, #30, 52 Aftermath: The Four Horsemen #1-6, and DC Comics Presents #52. | 2025 | ISBN 978-1-7995-0333-0 |

A third collection, titled Fire Away containing issues #14–22, was originally scheduled but never released.

=== Volume 6 ===
The sixth volume of Doom Patrol, written by Gerard Way, was published under DC's Young Animal Imprint, headed by Way.

Collections of Doom Patrol, Vol. 6
| Title | Material collected | Year | ISBN |
|---|---|---|---|
| Doom Patrol: Brick by Brick | Doom Patrol Vol. 6 #1–6 | 2017 | ISBN 978-1-4012-6979-1 |
| Doom Patrol: Nada | Doom Patrol Vol. 6 #7–12 | 2018 | ISBN 978-1-4012-7500-6 |
| Doom Patrol: Weight of the Worlds | Doom Patrol: Weight of the Worlds #1-7 | 2020 | ISBN 978-1-77950-078-6 |
| Doom Patrol by Gerard Way and Nick Derington: The Deluxe Edition | Doom Patrol Vol. 6 #1-12 (2016-2018), Doom Patrol: Weight of the Worlds #1-7 | 2023 | ISBN 978-1-77952-138-5 |

=== Volume 7 ===
Collections of Doom Patrol Vol. 7
| Title | Material collected | Year | ISBN |
|---|---|---|---|
| Unstoppable Doom Patrol | Unstoppable Doom Patrol #1-7, and material from Lazarus Planet: Dark Fate #1 | 2024 | ISBN 978-1-77952-294-8 |

== In other media ==
=== Television ===
Promotional poster for the Doom Patrol series

- The Doom Patrol appear in the Teen Titans episode "Homecoming", consisting of Mento, Negative Man, Robotman, and Elasti-Girl. Additionally, Beast Boy was also a member of the team before he left and eventually joined the Teen Titans.
- The original Doom Patrol appears in the Batman: The Brave and the Bold episode "The Last Patrol!", consisting of the Chief, Elasti-Girl, Negative Man, and Robotman. This version of the team operated years prior until they failed to save a hostage amidst General Zahl's invasion of Paris and disbanded. In the present, Batman helps the Doom Patrol come out of retirement when Zahl forms an alliance with the rest of the Doom Patrol's enemies to seek revenge. While Batman defeats Zahl and his alliance, the Doom Patrol sacrifice themselves to save the town of Codsville, whose residents rename their town to "Four Heroes" in their memory.
- The original Doom Patrol appear in a self-titled segment of DC Nation Shorts, consisting of the Chief, Elasti-Girl, Negative Man, and Robotman.
- The Doom Patrol appear in Teen Titans Go!, consisting of the Chief, Robotman, Elasti-Girl, and Negative Girl. Similarly to the Teen Titans series, Beast Boy was also a member before he joined the Teen Titans.
- The Doom Patrol appear in the Young Justice: Outsiders episode "Nightmare Monkeys", consisting of the Chief, Mento, Elasti-Girl, Robotman, Negative Woman, and Beast Boy. This version of the team, barring Mento, Beast Boy, and Robotman, were all killed while on a mission years prior.
- The Doom Patrol appear in Titans, consisting of the Chief, Elasti-Woman, Robotman, and Negative Man.
- The Doom Patrol appear in a self-titled TV series, consisting of the Chief, Robotman, Negative Man, Elasti-Woman, Jane, and Cyborg. Additionally, a 1950s incarnation of the team appears in the episode "Doom Patrol Patrol", consisting of the Chief, Mento, Joshua Clay, Arani Desai, and Rhea Jones.
  - The present-day Doom Patrol also make a cameo appearance in the Arrowverse crossover "Crisis on Infinite Earths" via archive footage of a deleted scene from a season one episode.

=== Film ===
The Doom Patrol make a cameo appearance in Justice League: The New Frontier, consisting of the Chief, Robotman, Negative Man, and Elasti-Girl.

== See also ==
- List of Doom Patrol members
- X-Men
