= Celsius (character) =

- Celsius as depicted in Doom Patrol (vol. 2) #1 (October 1987). Art by Steve Lightle.

Publication information
- Publisher: DC Comics
- First appearance: Showcase #94 (September 1977)
- Created by: Paul Kupperberg; Joe Staton

In-story information
- Alter ego: Arani Desai Caulder
- Species: Metahuman
- Team affiliations: Doom Patrol; Black Lantern Corps
- Notable aliases: Arani Caulder
- Abilities: Fire and ice manipulation Skilled martial artist

Celsius (Arani Desai) is a superhero in the DC Comics series Doom Patrol. She first appeared in Showcase #94 (September 1977), and was created by Paul Kupperberg and Joe Staton. She is among the very few superheroes of Indian heritage, and may be the first ever such hero created by DC Comics.

Celsius appeared in her first live adaptation on the first season of the Doom Patrol television series for DC Universe played by Jasmine Kaur and Madhur Jaffrey.

== Background and creation ==
Celsius was created for the new, rebooted Doom Patrol which debuted in Showcase #94-96. Inspired by Len Wein and Dave Cockrum's "New X-Men", writer Paul Kupperberg wanted to have some heroes of different nationalities in the group. Artist Joe Staton used photos from National Geographic articles about India as the model for Celsius.

== Fictional character biography ==
Arani Desai was born in India into a life of wealth and privilege. She ran away from home after her father went insane and was rescued by Niles Caulder, who gave her an immortality-inducing serum on their wedding and left her in the Himalayas while he tried to evade General Immortus. Arani later realizes that the serum also gave her the ability to control her core temperature and project heat and cold.

After discovering that the Doom Patrol were killed in battle with Madame Rouge and General Zahl, Arani searches for Caulder, whom she refuses to believe died. The new Doom Patrol team is captured by Immortus, who momentarily restores his youth by using the mind-probe on Arani to get the immortality formula from her. As the treatment Arani had been given was prepared specifically for her metabolism, it backfires on Immortus.

Kalki from Doom Patrol (vol. 2) #3, art by Steve Lightle.

The Doom Patrol discovers that Negative Man is alive, but has lost the negative spirit that resided in him, which possessed Valentina Vostok. Negative Man is taken hostage of Arani's father Ashok, who intends to bring about the Kali Yuga. Ashok previously worked with Niles Caulder to develop the immortality serum and tested an early version of it on himself, activating his metagene and transforming him into a living portal to a dimension that he believes to be Hell. Celsius injures Ashok, causing the demons on the other side of his portal to turn on him and drag him to their dimension.

In the storyline Invasion!, Arani is killed in a suicidal attempt to stop a Gil'Dishpan battle cruiser from escaping the Arctic Circle. She manages to cripple the cruiser, preventing it from taking off, but is killed by the force of the cruiser's engines. She remains dead for many years before being resurrected as a Black Lantern during the storyline Blackest Night. Arani returns following the relaunch The New 52 and later becomes the leader of the Doomed, India's sanctioned superhero team.

== Powers and abilities ==
Celsius is a superior martial artist due to her monastery training. She has minor levels of ancient mysticism taught to her due to her monastery training in the Himalayas by Buddhist monks. The monks taught Arani to control and manipulate her core temperature, projecting fire and ice from her left and right hands respectively.

== In other media ==
Celsius appears in the Doom Patrol episode "Doom Patrol Patrol", portrayed by Jasmine Kaur as a young woman and Madhur Jaffrey as an old woman. This version was a member of a 1950s incarnation of the Doom Patrol before they were defeated and rendered mentally ill by Mr. Nobody.
