= Jack-in-Irons =

Mythical English giant

Jack-In-Irons is a mythical giant of Yorkshire lore who haunts lonely roads. He is covered with chains and wears the heads of his victims. He wields a large, spiked club. His name may not be Jack as other Yorkshire folklore refers to "Jack in the Green" and more so the name Jack may just be a term for calling the person an unknown male, like John Doe today.

Jack-in-Irons is portrayed in the Merry Gentry series by Laurell K. Hamilton. He is described as follows: "Uther was thirteen feet tall, with a head that was more pig than human, and two curling tusks on either side of his snout. He was a jack-in-irons, but he was named Uther Squarefoot."
