= Steve Lightle =

American comic artist (1959–2021)

- Born: November 19, 1959 Kansas City, Kansas, U.S.
- Died: January 8, 2021 (aged 61) Kansas City, Missouri, U.S.
- Area: Penciller
- Notable works: Doom Patrol; Legion of Super-Heroes; Classic X-Men

Steve Lightle (November 19, 1959 – January 8, 2021) was an American comics artist who worked primarily as a penciller. He was best known as the artist of DC Comics' Legion of Super-Heroes and Doom Patrol titles.

== Biography ==
Steve Lightle was born in Kansas City, Kansas and attended the Johnson County Community College in the Kansas City metropolitan area. His first professional comic book work was a five-page story in Black Diamond #4 (Feb. 1984) published by AC Comics. He followed this with his debut at DC Comics, drawing a 10-page story in New Talent Showcase #4 (April 1984), a series intended to provide work for up-and-coming artists who did not have a regular assignment.

In 1984, Lightle followed Keith Giffen as the penciller of Legion of Super-Heroes. Lightle described it as being a "dream assignment" to work on the title. One of Lightle's issues featured the death of longtime Legion member Karate Kid. Although Lightle's tenure as interior artist was brief, he continued as cover artist until 1988. Lightle co-created the characters Tellus and Quislet, whose unusual appearances contrasted with the humanoid appearances of the other Legionnaires.

In 1986, Lightle was one of the contributors to the DC Challenge limited series and drew part of Batman #400 (Oct. 1986). The following year, he was the original penciller of the revival of Doom Patrol, but he left after the first five-issue story arc due to creative differences. Much of Lightle's work after that was as cover artist, typically inking his own penciled artwork. In 1989 and 1990, Lightle was the regular cover artist for Classic X-Men (later retitled X-Men Classic). He produced new covers and frontispieces to accompany the reprinted stories.

On January 8, 2021, Lightle's wife Marianne and son Matthew announced through social media that he had died suddenly from a cardiac arrest caused by COVID-19 during the COVID-19 pandemic in Missouri. He was 61 years old.

== Bibliography ==
=== AC Comics ===
- Black Diamond #4 (1984)

=== DC Comics ===
- Adventure Comics 80-Page Giant #1 (Superboy) (1998)
- Batman #400 (1986)
- Batman and the Outsiders #10 (1984)
- Booster Gold: Futures End #1 (2014)
- DC Challenge #12 (1986)
- Doom Patrol vol. 2 #1–5 (1987–1988)
- The Flash vol. 2 #226 (2005)
- The Flash 80-Page Giant #2 (1999)
- The Flash Annual #10 (1997)
- History of the DC Universe hardcover (three pages) (1988)
- JLA-Z #1 (one page) (2003)
- The Legion #24, 34 (2003–2004)
- Legion of Super-Heroes vol. 3 #3–5, 7–10, 12–14, 16, 23 (1984–1986)
- New Talent Showcase #4–6 (1984)
- The Outsiders #2–3 (backup stories) (1985–1986)
- Who's Who in the DC Universe #2–3, 6–7, 13–14 (1990–1991)
- Who's Who in the Legion of Super-Heroes #1–2 (1988)
- Who's Who: The Definitive Directory of the DC Universe #3, 5, 8, 12–13, 16, 18, 20, 23 (1985–1987)
- Who's Who: Update '87 #3–4 (1987)
- Wonder Woman Gallery #1 (1996)
- Wonder Woman Secret Files and Origins #1 (1998)
- World's Finest Comics #304, 306 (1984)

=== Marvel Comics ===
- The Amazing Spider-Man '96 #1 (1996)
- Excalibur: XX Crossing (1992)
- Generation X '95 #1 (1995)
- Marvel Comics Presents #109–116 (Wolverine and Typhoid Mary); #123–130 (Ghost Rider and Typhoid Mary); #132–136 (Wolverine); #150 (Vengeance, Wolverine, Daredevil, Typhoid Mary); #175 (Steel Raven, New Genix) (1992–1995)
- Marvel Holiday Special (Spider-Man) (1992)
- Quasar #39–40 (1992)
- Web of Spider-Man Super Special #1 (1995)
- X-Factor #32 (1988)

Preceded by Keith Giffen	Legion of Super-Heroes vol. 3 artist 1984–1985	Succeeded by Greg LaRocque
Preceded by n/a	Doom Patrol vol. 2 artist 1987–1988	Succeeded by Erik Larsen
