= My Greatest Adventure =

DC Comics anthology series (1955–1964)

- Cover to My Greatest Adventure #80 (June 1963), the first appearance of the Doom Patrol; art by Bruno Premiani.

Publication information
- Publisher: DC Comics
- Schedule: Monthly
- Format: Ongoing
- Publication date: January 1955 – February 1964
- No. of issues: 85
- Main character(s): Doom Patrol

My Greatest Adventure is a DC Comics comic book that began in 1955 and is best known for introducing the superhero team Doom Patrol.

== Publication history ==
The title was originally an anthology series with adventure stories told in the first-person narrative. Over time the types of stories changed from simple adventure stories to science fiction. With issue #80 (June 1963), the anthology format was dropped and replaced with stories featuring the Doom Patrol. Issue #85 was the last to bear the My Greatest Adventure title; the series was renamed The Doom Patrol going forward from issue #86.

Issues #80–85 were reprinted as part of The Doom Patrol Archives, Vol. 1 (2002, ISBN 1-56389-795-4).

== Contributors ==
=== Writers ===
- Arnold Drake
- Bob Haney

=== Artists ===
- Mort Meskin
- Jim Mooney
- Ruben Moreira
- Bruno Premiani
- John Prentice
- Alex Toth

== 2011 revival ==
A six-issue revival of the series debuted in October 2011, and was written by Aaron Lopresti, Kevin Maguire, and Matt Kindt. It was an anthology featuring three stories: Garbageman, Tanga, and Robotman.

== Homages ==
A reference to My Greatest Adventure appears in Teen Titans Go! #28. When the Titans and Doom Patrol put together a birthday party for Beast Boy, members of the Doom Patrol tell the Titans some of their past adventures when Beast Boy was a member, including when they fought Animal-Vegetable-Mineral Man. This flashback features a mock cover of My Greatest Adventure.

In Teen Titans #36, Steve Dayton starts working on an autobiography based on his time in the Doom Patrol, which he plans to call My Greatest Adventure.
