= Bruno Premiani =

Austro-Hungarian comic book artist (1907–1984)

- Born: Giordano Bruno Premiani; January 4, 1907 Trieste, Austria-Hungary (now Italy)
- Died: August 17, 1984 (aged 77) Argentina
- Notable works: Doom Patrol; Teen Titans

Giordano Bruno Premiani (/priːmiˈæni/; January 4, 1907 – August 17, 1984) was an Italian illustrator known for his work for several American comic book publishers, particularly DC Comics. With writer Arnold Drake, he co-created DC's superhero team the Doom Patrol, then with writer Bob Haney, he co-created DC's superhero team the Teen Titans.

== Biography ==
=== Early life and career ===
Bruno Premiani was born in Trieste, in what was then Austria-Hungary. It became part of Italy by the time Premiani studied at the city's arts and crafts high school from 1921 to 1925. He became a political cartoonist in his maturity, and was expelled from the country for his anti-Benito Mussolini work. He emigrated to Argentina in 1930, where he worked for the Agencia Wisner advertising agency and the daily newspaper Crítica, for which he did the 1932–1940 educational comic section "Seen and Heard". Italy's Fascist government during this time kept track of Premiani's Critica work, and decreed he would be arrested if he returned to Italy. Premiani did return to attend his mother's funeral in 1950, years after the Fascist regime had toppled.

Through the 1940s, Premiani drew for such Argentine publications as Léoplan and the children's magazine Billiken. In 1947, he began illustrating "Patoruzito Classics" comics-adaptations of literary works for comics artist Dante Quinterno's 1945 Patoruzito comic book. However, as he had with Mussolini, Premiani similarly ran afoul of Juan Perón.

=== DC Comics ===
Moving to the United States, where he lived from 1948 to 1952, Premiani found work with DC Comics, beginning as penciler-inker of the four-page Gantry Daniels biography "The Sun-Born Mountain Man" in World's Finest Comics #42 (cover-dated Oct. 1949). Comic book creators were not routinely given credits during this era, and historians have tentatively identified Premiani art in a number of Prize Comics titles, starting with the eight-page "Love-Sick Weakling" in Western Love #2 (Oct. 1949).

For DC, Premiani penciled and generally also inked his own work for such features as "Johnny Peril" in All-Star Comics #52 (May 1950), and "Pow-Wow Smith, Indian Lawman" in Detective Comics #163 (Sept. 1950). He then became regular artist for the American Revolution-era frontiersman hero Tomahawk after that character's feature in Star-Spangled Comics was awarded its own title, beginning with Tomahawk #1 (Oct. 1950). Premiani published two more stories in Prize Comics' horror title Black Magic before devoting himself almost exclusively to Tomahawk, drawing the hero's six- to eight-page stories in all but two issues (#27, #30) in a run through issue #36 (Nov. 1955). He also drew Tomahawk stories in World's Finest Comics #73-75 & 79 (Dec. 1954 - April 1955 & Dec. 1955).

As well this decade, Premiani illustrated the book El Caballo, published in 1957, a source of information about the anatomy and history of the horse for artists, with text written by his wife, Beatriz.

With writer France Herron, Premiani co-created Cave Carson, a spelunker/geologist adventurer, in The Brave and the Bold #31 (Sept. 1960).

==== Doom Patrol ====
Premiani most notably drew the original incarnations of the Doom Patrol in 1963 and the Teen Titans in 1964, both series being cult favorites that have survived in one form or another, if sporadically, since their original creation for the DC Comics universe. In the case of the former superhero team, editor Murray Boltinoff had asked writer Arnold Drake to develop a feature to run in the anthology series My Greatest Adventure. Given the assignment on a Friday with a script due that Tuesday, Drake conceived what would become the Doom Patrol, and turned to another DC writer, Bob Haney, to co-plot and co-script the first adventure. Premiani designed the characters. Drake would subsequently script every Doom Patrol story, with Premiani drawing virtually all, from the team's debut in My Greatest Adventure #80 (June 1963) through the series retitling to The Doom Patrol with issue #86 (March 1964), to the final issue of its initial run, #121 (Oct. 1968). Premiani and Boltinoff appeared as themselves in that final story, discussing the impending demise of the team.

In 2001, Drake wrote of the search for a Doom Patrol illustrator, saying that Boltinoff's regular artists

...were all busy. That meant the DP would get some backup artist. So 'pessimism' was the password when Murray brought in a very lean, eagle-beaked, lantern-jawed guy with eyeglass lenses even thicker than mine: Bruno Premiani. But his superb draftsmanship, anatomy and design work turned my prejudice to dust. Still, could he give the DP the unique quality it needed — a quality I couldn't define myself? Bruno's first penciled pages told me we had truly lucked out. What he had recognized was that these super-heroes must be as human as possible. He captured that spirit from page one and sustained it for 42 issues: fabulous powers and fantastic enemies notwithstanding, The Chief, Rita, Larry and Cliff remained real people.

Premiani drew proto-teamings of the as-yet-unnamed Teen Titans beginning with the Kid Flash-Aqualad-Robin adventure "The Thousand-and-One Dooms of Mr. Twister" in The Brave and the Bold #54 (July 1964).

Additionally, in the early 1960s, Premiani freelanced for the Gilberton Company's Classics Illustrated, Classics Illustrated Special Issue, and World Around Us series. His major project was the painted cover and complete interior art for Classics Illustrated No. 156, The Conquest of Mexico (May 1960), based on Bernal Diaz del Castillo's eyewitness account of the fall of the Aztec empire. In addition, he contributed sections to two Special Issues, The Atomic Age (June 1960) and The United Nations (1964). Most of Premiani's work for Gilberton was for the educational World Around Us line, for which he provided chapters in The Crusades (December 1959), Festivals (January 1960), Great Scientists (February 1960), Communications (April 1960), Whaling (December 1960), and The Vikings (January 1961).

=== Later career and death ===
Premiani's last known original comics story was the three-and-a-half-page "Please Let Me Die", written by Dave Wood, in The Unexpected #126 (Aug. 1971).

Premiani died in Argentina, on August 17, 1984.
