= Valentina Vostok =

- Valentina Vostok and Matthew Cable on the cover of Showcase #96, art by Jim Aparo.

Publication information
- Publisher: DC Comics
- First appearance: Showcase #94 (August 1977)
- Created by: Paul Kupperberg; Joe Staton

In-story information
- Alter ego: Lt. Col. Valentina Vostok
- Species: Human; Metahuman (temporarily)
- Team affiliations: Checkmate; The Agency; Doom Patrol; Soviet Air Force; US Secret Service; Black Lantern Corps
- Notable aliases: Negative Woman; White Queen
- Abilities: (Currently): Expertise in aviation and espionage; (Formerly): Negative form

Valentina Vostok is a fictional character by DC Comics. She first appeared in Showcase #94 (August 1977), and was created by Paul Kupperberg and Joe Staton.

In live-action, Valentina Vostok made her debut in the first season of the CW Arrowverse series Legends of Tomorrow, played by Stephanie Corneliussen. Mariana Klaveno portrayed the character in the second season of the DC Universe/HBO Max series Doom Patrol.

== Fictional character biography ==
Valentina Vostok is a lieutenant colonel in the Soviet Air Force who steals an experimental Russian fighter plane to defect to the United States. After crashing at the site of the original Doom Patrol's death, Vostok is fused with the negative energy being which previously inhabited the body of Negative Man. It is later revealed that Doom Patrol founder Niles Caulder facilitated Vostok's transformation so that she could replace Negative Man.

Assuming the name Negative Woman, Vostok joins the second incarnation of Doom Patrol and enters a relationship with Joshua Clay. However, they break up after Vostok's powers evolve, causing her to become radioactive and forcing her to wear radiation-blocking bandages over her body.

Negative Man later resurfaces and absorbs Vostok's negative energy, leaving her powerless. Vostok goes on to become the leader of the Agency and the White Queen of Checkmate, and joins the Blüdhaven Strike Force in Final Crisis.

In Blackest Night, Vostok dies under unspecified circumstances and is resurrected as a Black Lantern before Negative Man kills her.

In The New 52 continuity reboot, Vostok is resurrected before being killed by Johnny Quick and Atomica. Vostok returns in Doomsday Clock, where she joins the People's Heroes, Russia's sanctioned superhero team.

== Powers and abilities ==
As the Negative Woman, Valentina Vostok possessed a radioactive "soul-self", and was capable of flight, intangibility, and could generate minor explosions upon contact with positive energy. As the White Queen, she has mastery of military protocol.

== In other media ==
=== Television ===
- Valentina Vostok appears in Legends of Tomorrow, portrayed by Stephanie Corneliussen. This version is a Soviet scientist from the 1980s who Vandal Savage hired to develop a composite "nuclear man" after witnessing Firestorm a decade prior. Savage and Vostok capture half of Firestorm, Martin Stein, and torture his allies to force him to divulge the F.I.R.E.S.T.O.R.M. matrix's secrets. After Vostok discovers Stein has part of the matrix, she forces him to merge with her despite his warnings of requiring a "quantum splicer" to stabilize the process. Jefferson Jackson encourages Stein to fight Vostok's control and frees him while Vostok loses control of the matrix.
- Valentina Vostok / Negative Woman appears in the Young Justice episode "Nightmare Monkeys", voiced by Tara Strong. This version was a member of the Doom Patrol before she and most of her team were killed while on a mission years prior.
- Valentina Vostok, also known as Moscow, appears in the Doom Patrol episode "Space Patrol", portrayed by Mariana Klaveno. This version is a member of the Pioneers of the Uncharted, a research team sent into space by the Chief in 1955 to find a source of time-dilating power. Her teammates Zip and Spec were killed during the mission, but Vostok made contact with a negative energy entity which possessed her. Over 60 years later, the now ageless Vostok returns to Earth so she can use the planet's atmosphere to kill alien spores that revived Zip and Spec. She befriends Larry Trainor, who also bonded with a negative spirit, and invites him to join her in space, but he declines in favor of repairing his relationship with his family.

=== Film ===
Valentina Vostok / Negative Woman appears in Justice League: Crisis on Infinite Earths.

== See also ==
- List of Russian superheroes
