= Richard Case =

American comics artist

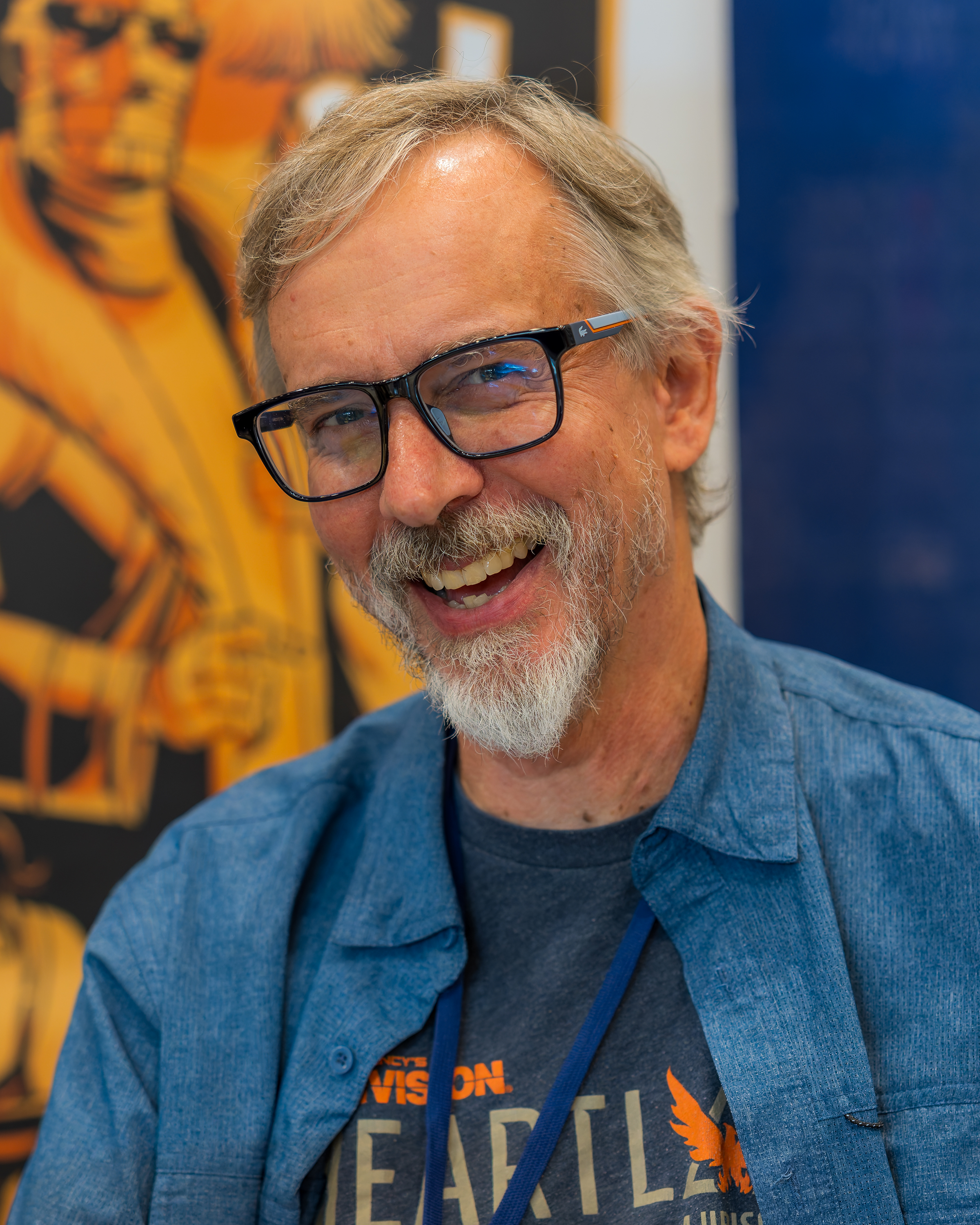
- Case in 2026
- Born: 1964 (age 61–62)
- Areas: Penciller, Inker
- Notable works: Doctor Strange; Doom Patrol; Hunter: The Age of Magic; Sandman

Richard Case (born 1964) is an American comics artist best known for his work for DC Comics especially the Vertigo imprint.

He is not to be confused with the similarly-named Richard Case, another comics artist who worked for the Iger Studio and Fiction House in the 1940s.

== Career ==
After receiving a Bachelor of Fine Arts degree from the Rhode Island School of Design, Richard Case worked as an assistant to comics artist Walt Simonson in 1985. Case's first credited published comic book story appeared in Marvel Comics' Strange Tales vol. 2 #10 (Jan. 1988). He moved to DC Comics and pencilled the majority of issues of Grant Morrison's run on Doom Patrol beginning with issue #19 (Feb. 1989). In 1992, he drew several issues of Darkhold: Pages from the Book of Sins for Marvel. Back at DC, Case inked Marc Hempel's pencils on the Sandman story "The Kindly Ones" and penciled a few pages in Hempel's style. He illustrated Jamie Delano's Ghostdancing limited series, the final story arc of Peter Milligan's Shade, the Changing Man, and Hunter: The Age of Magic with Dylan Horrocks. Since leaving the comics industry, he has worked extensively in computer game illustration especially for Ubisoft.

== Bibliography ==
=== DC Comics ===
- The Books of Magic vol. 2 #48, inks (1998)
- DC One Million 80–Page Giant #1, inks (1999)
- Deadenders #1–8, inks (2000)
- Doom Force Special #1, inks (1992)
- Doom Patrol vol. 2 #19–24, 26–35, 37–41, 44, 46–52, 54–57, 59–66 (1989–1993)
- Flinch #15, inks (2000)
- Gemini Blood #3–4, inks (1996)
- Ghostdancing #1–6 (1995)
- Hunter: The Age of Magic #1–6, 8–25 (2001–2003)
- Legends of the DC Universe #15–17 (The Flash) (1999)
- The Names of Magic #1–5 (2001)
- Preacher Special: The Story of You-Know-Who #1 (1996)
- Sandman #65–68, inks (1994–1995)
- Sandman Mystery Theatre #46–48, 57–60, inks (1997–1998)
- Shade, the Changing Man vol. 2 #61–63, 65–70 (1995–1996)
- Starman: The Mist #1 (1998)
- Totems #1, inks (2000)
- Vertigo: Winter's Edge #3, inks (2000)
- Who's Who in the DC Universe #1, 3, 6–7, 9–11, 15 (1990–1992)
- Wonder Woman Gallery #1 (one page) (1996)

=== Image Comics ===
- Gen 13 Bikini Pin-Up Special #1 (one page) (1997)

=== Marvel Comics ===
- Cable #73, 75, 77, 79, inks (1999–2000)
- Darkhold: Pages from the Book of Sins #1–2, 5–6 (1992–1993)
- Deathlok vol. 3 #6 (2000)
- Doctor Strange, Sorcerer Supreme #1–4 (1988–1989)
- Fantastic Four vol. 2 #13, inks (1997)
- Marvel Super Hero Island Adventures #1, inks (1999)
- Nighthawk #1–3 (1998)
- The Sensational Spider-Man #8–11, 13–17, -1, 19–20, 22–23, 27–28, 31 (1996–1998)
- Spider-Man: Death and Destiny #1–3, inks (2000)
- Strange Tales vol. 2 #10–11, 13–19 (Doctor Strange) (1988)
- Wolverine '96 #1, inks (1996)

Preceded by Terry Shoemaker	Strange Tales vol. 2 artist 1988	Succeeded by n/a
Preceded by n/a	Doctor Strange, Sorcerer Supreme artist 1988-1989	Succeeded by Jackson Guice
Preceded by Graham Nolan	Doom Patrol vol. 2 artist 1989–1993	Succeeded by Linda Medley
Preceded by Al Williamson	The Sensational Spider-Man inker 1996–1998	Succeeded by Ralph Cabrera
