= Joshua Clay =

- Tempest as depicted in Doom Patrol (vol. 2) Annual #1 (December 1988). Art by James Fry.

Publication information
- Publisher: DC Comics
- First appearance: Showcase #94 (August 1977)
- Created by: Paul Kupperberg; Joe Staton

In-story information
- Alter ego: Joshua Clay
- Species: Metahuman
- Team affiliations: Doom Patrol; Black Lantern Corps
- Notable aliases: Jonathan Carmichael, Tempest
- Abilities: Kinetic energy blasts; Flight

Joshua Clay, also known as Tempest, is a member of the superhero team Doom Patrol in comic books published by DC Comics. Created by Paul Kupperberg and Joe Staton, he first appeared in Showcase #94 (August 1977).

Joshua Clay appeared in his first live adaptation on the first season of the Doom Patrol television series for DC Universe played by Alimi Ballard.

== Fictional character biography ==
A member of the second Doom Patrol, Joshua Clay is the first DC Comics hero to use the name Tempest. Along with Captain Comet, he is one of the few DC Comics heroes initially identified as a mutant.

Joshua Clay was born in the Brownsville section of Brooklyn, New York, the youngest of five children. His parents struggled to keep their family together in the middle of what was at that time one of the worst slums in the country. At sixteen, Joshua joined a street gang called the Stompers, and eventually, as a result, wound up being given a choice between prison and service in the United States military. Joshua chose the army and was trained as a combat medic and shipped off to Vietnam.

Less than a month before the end of his tour, Joshua witnessed the attempted massacre of an entire village of Vietnamese non-combatants by his sergeant. Horrified, Joshua unconsciously triggered his powers, apparently killing the man. The stress of this discovery led Clay to go AWOL and flee the country, eventually returning to the U.S. Clay spent the next ten years living as a fugitive. The sergeant eventually becomes Reactron, an enemy of the Doom Patrol.

Arani Caulder tracks down Joshua Clay and enlists him as a member of the new Doom Patrol. Clay stays active within this incarnation of the Doom Patrol for a year before it disbands due to internal dissent. Swearing off superheroics, Clay uses his underworld connections to secure a new identity for himself as Jonathan Carmichael, M.D. Due to years of private study and his previous military training, he easily passes his New York medical board examination. As Carmichael, using funds borrowed from a local loan shark, he purchases a small Park Avenue medical practice and lives a quiet, respectable life treating rich hypochondriacs until Robotman tracks Clay down. Due to Steele's threat to reveal Clay's true identity to the medical board, he reluctantly returns to superheroics. He again retires from active service during the Grant Morrison scripted period to become the team's physician.

In Doom Patrol #55 (1992), the Chief kills Joshua after he discovers his plan to ravage Earth with a genetic weapon and create an improved society. Joshua is temporarily resurrected as a Black Lantern in Blackest Night and permanently resurrected in The New 52 continuity reboot. Following the DC Rebirth relaunch, Joshua's history is retconned, restoring his death to continuity.

== Powers and abilities ==
Kinetic energy blast, art by James Fry.

Joshua Clay draws power from the sun and thusly can generate and radiate powerful blasts from his hands, able to melt steel. Tempest can control his blasts' volume and intensity to the extent that he can ignite the head of a match from twenty feet away. Properly focused and controlled, his energies allow Tempest to propel himself through the air at 90 miles per hour.

As a Black Lantern, Joshua can manipulate weather.

Trained as a combat medic by the U.S. Army, he later becomes a licensed physician.

== Other versions ==
An alternate universe version of Joshua Clay appears in Teen Titans: Earth One as a member of S.T.A.R. Labs.

== In other media ==
Joshua Clay appears in Doom Patrol, portrayed by Alimi Ballard. This version was a member of a 1950s incarnation of the Doom Patrol before they were defeated by Mr. Nobody. Following this, Clay became a caretaker to his incapacitated teammates.
