= Mento (character) =

- Mento as depicted in Teen Titans (vol. 3) #37 (August 2006). Art by Tony Daniel.

Publication information
- Publisher: DC Comics
- First appearance: Doom Patrol #91 (November 1964)
- Created by: Arnold Drake (writer); Bruno Premiani (artist)

In-story information
- Alter ego: Steve Dayton
- Species: Metahuman
- Team affiliations: Doom Patrol; Hybrid; Dayton Industries; Task Force XI
- Notable aliases: The Crimelord
- Abilities: Psionic abilities Empathy: Empathic burst; Empathic projection; Lie detection; Telepathy: Thought projection; Memory manipulation; Limited mind control; Mind reading; Telekinesis: Telekinetic shield; Telekinetic force manipulation; Extrasensory perception: Clairvoyance; Clairaudience; Psychometry; Precognition; Enhanced intuition; Danger intuition

Mento (Steve Dayton) is a fictional character appearing in American comic books published by DC Comics. He would become an associate of the Doom Patrol, the husband of Elasti-Girl, and the adoptive father of Beast Boy.

Mento appeared in the first season of the Doom Patrol television series for DC Universe played by Will Kemp and Dave Bielawski.

== Publication history ==
Created by Arnold Drake and Bruno Premiani, Mento first appeared in Doom Patrol #91 (November 1964).

== Fictional character biography ==
Steve Dayton, the world's fifth richest man, builds a helmet to enhance his mental abilities and calls himself Mento. This is an attempt on Dayton's part to impress Elasti-Girl (a.k.a. Rita Farr) of the Doom Patrol. Although his arrogant manner annoys the male field members of the team, he is successful, and in Doom Patrol #104 (June 1966), Mento and Elasti-Girl are married. They soon adopt Beast Boy (a.k.a. Garfield Logan). After Elasti-Girl's death, Mento becomes involved in the hunt for her killers, General Zahl and Madame Rouge. Dayton invents a form of uranium called Promethium to which is later used by Deathstroke and Cyborg.

In Swamp Thing, Mento is recruited by John Constantine for a small gathering of powerful beings to assist in a battle taking place in Hell. The demonic forces are facing an entity that could easily overwhelm and destroy them, even with the aid of divine forces. Using Mento to get a 'read' on the situation, John assists the battle with magical power. Despite the defeat of the entity, Sargon the Sorcerer and Zatara are killed and Mento is driven insane.

Dayton, now in a wheelchair, resumes his Mento identity and lashes out at Garfield, blaming him for the deaths of the original Doom Patrol. He then proceeds to create his own team, the Hybrid, to challenge the Teen Titans. After multiple encounters, the members of Hybrid defy Mento and join the Titans in curing him. Raven cures him of his madness and he seems to discard the helmet.

Much later, Dayton hires Deathstroke to find the Titans during the Titan Hunt storyline. Afterwards, he becomes the "Crimelord" and tries to frame Deathstroke for murder, but Dayton's identity and plans are revealed and Deathstroke is cleared of all charges.

One Year Later, Steve Dayton is revealed to have returned with the rest of the Doom Patrol. Though a member of the Patrol, he furiously writes novels (remarking that he intends to entitle the series My Greatest Adventure), supposedly spurred on by a creative streak created by the helmet. He also seems to have developed an addiction again to his helmet, as he claims that Rita is only in love with Mento and not Steve Dayton. He claims to remember his days as the Crimelord, calling them "a glitch in the helmet".

Seeing the truth about Niles Caulder, who is trying to convince Kid Devil to join the Doom Patrol by telling him that the Titans will always despise him as a freak, Dayton shakes off his addiction and finally removes the helmet. Thinking clearly again for the first time in years, he takes the control of the Doom Patrol from Caulder.

In the 2010 run of Doom Patrol, Mento is revealed to have left the Patrol, despite still being in contact with Caulder. Estranged from his wife, as his marriage failed when Rita found out how Dayton routinely used his mind-reading powers on her, he is called back by Caulder to stop an alien hive mind by using Rita as a proxy. After learning of this new violation, Rita cuts ties with Mento, blaming Caulder too for her mistreatment.

In 2011, "The New 52" rebooted the DC Universe. Steve Dayton's history with Elasti-Girl and Beast Boy remains intact. After the apparent death of Elasti-Girl, Dayton has his assistant Breuer raise Beast Boy.

In the "DC Rebirth" series Justice League: No Justice, Amanda Waller recruits Mento into Task Force XI, a group of telepaths, to combat Brainiac.

== Powers and abilities ==
Steve Dayton wears a helmet of his own invention that amplifies his latent psychic powers. While wearing the helmet, he possesses telepathy, psychokinesis, intangibility, and limited mind control. While the helmet also increased Dayton's paranoia, Raven is eventually able to cure him of these side effects.

== Other versions ==
=== JLA: The Nail ===
An alternate universe version of Mento appears in JLA: The Nail as a member of the Doom Patrol.

=== Teen Titans: Earth One ===
An alternate universe version of Steve Dayton appears in Teen Titans: Earth One. This version is a S.T.A.R. Labs scientist.

== In other media ==
=== Television ===
Mento as depicted in Teen Titans

- Mento appears in the Teen Titans episode "Homecoming", voiced by Xander Berkeley. This version is the leader of the Doom Patrol.
- Mento appears in Young Justice, voiced by Scott Menville. This version is Beast Boy's legal guardian who exploits his abilities for profit despite displaying a mutual disliking towards him. After forming the Outsiders, Beast Boy is legally emancipated from Mento.
- Mento appears in the Doom Patrol episode "Doom Patrol Patrol", portrayed by Will Kemp as a young man and by Dave Bielawski as an old man. This version dated Rita Farr in 1955 and was a member of a 1950s incarnation of the Doom Patrol before they were defeated by Mr. Nobody and disbanded. As a result of the battle, Mento loses control of his powers, which Joshua Clay works to keep in check while caring for him.

=== Film ===
Mento appears in Justice League: Crisis on Infinite Earths.

=== Video games ===
Mento appears as a character summon in Scribblenauts Unmasked: A DC Comics Adventure.

=== Miscellaneous ===
- Mento appears in Teen Titans Go!.
- Mento appears in Batman: The Brave and the Bold #9.
