= Madame Rouge =

DC Comics supervillain

- Madame Rouge as depicted in Who's Who: The Definitive Directory of the DC Universe #14 (April 1986). Art by John Byrne.

Publication information
- Publisher: DC Comics
- First appearance: Doom Patrol #86 (March 1964)
- Created by: Arnold Drake

In-story information
- Alter ego: Laura De Mille
- Team affiliations: Brotherhood of Evil; Black Lantern Corps
- Abilities: Shapeshifting; Elasticity; Disguise intuition

Madame Rouge (Laura De Mille) is a supervillain appearing in DC Comics, primarily as an enemy of the Doom Patrol. She first appeared in Doom Patrol #86 (March 1964), and was created by Arnold Drake.

Michelle Gomez portrays the character in the third and fourth seasons of the HBO Max series Doom Patrol.

== Fictional character biography ==
Laura De Mille was originally a French stage actress. After an automobile accident results in neurological damage, she develops a malevolent split personality. The Brain and Monsieur Mallah perform surgery on De Mille that removes her "good" personality, allowing her evil one to become dominant, while also altering her physiology. Adopting the name "Madame Rouge", De Mille becomes a member of the Brotherhood of Evil.

Rouge later enters a relationship with the Doom Patrol's leader, Niles Caulder, who helps her overcome her evil half. She later returns to evil, seeking vengeance against the Doom Patrol and supposedly killing them. Years later, Robotman and the Teen Titans track down Rouge, who is killed by Changeling.

In Blackest Night, Madame Rouge is temporarily resurrected as a Black Lantern. Furthermore, her daughter Gemini succeeds her as a member of the Brotherhood of Evil.

== Powers and abilities ==
Originally, Madame Rouge had no powers, but was skilled in disguise. The Brain later alters Rouge's molecular structure, giving her an amorphous physiology. This allows her to stretch her body to incredible lengths, grants her strong resistance to physical harm, and makes her skin extremely malleable so that she can alter her features and even change her voice for impersonations.

== In other media ==
=== Television ===
- Madame Rouge appears in the fifth season of Teen Titans, voiced by Hynden Walch. This version is an arrogant and sadistic member of the Brotherhood of Evil who sports an Eastern European accent and expanded shapeshifting abilities.
- Madame Rouge appears in the DC Nation short "The Spy Within the Doom Patrol", voiced by Debra Wilson.
- Madame Rouge appears in Teen Titans Go! (2013), voiced again by Hynden Walch.
- Madame Rouge appears in Doom Patrol, portrayed by Michelle Gomez. This version is a member of the Bureau of Normalcy who becomes amnesiac due to time travel, subsequently allying with the Doom Patrol, the Sisterhood of Dada, and the Brotherhood of Evil at various points in the series.

=== Miscellaneous ===
- Madame Rouge appears in Justice League Unlimited #31.
- Madame Rouge appears in Justice League Adventures #6.
- Madame Rouge appears in Teen Titans Go! (2004).
