= Beast Boy =

Fictional character

- Promotional art for Teen Titans' DC Rebirth line. Art by Jonboy Meyers

Publication information
- Publisher: DC Comics
- First appearance: As Beast Boy: Doom Patrol #99 (November 1965); As Changeling: DC Comics Presents #26 (October 1980)
- Created by: Arnold Drake; Bob Brown

In-story information
- Alter ego: Garfield Mark "Gar" Logan
- Species: Metahuman
- Team affiliations: Teen Titans; Doom Patrol; Justice League; Young Justice; Titans West; The Ravagers; Titans; Outsiders
- Partnerships: Robotman (Cliff Steele); Negative Man; Mento (adoptive father); Elasti-Girl (adoptive mother); Dick Grayson; Bette Kane; Cyborg; Raven; Starfire; Wally West; Donna Troy; Animal Man
- Notable aliases: Changeling; George Chaplin
- Abilities: Animal morphing; Accelerated healing factor; Skilled hand-to-hand combatant

Beast Boy (Garfield Mark "Gar" Logan) is a superhero appearing in American comic books published by DC Comics. He has also gone under the alias Changeling. Created by writer Arnold Drake and artist Bob Brown, he is a shapeshifter who possesses the ability to transform into any animal he chooses. The character first appeared in Doom Patrol #99 (November 1965) and is usually depicted as a member of the Doom Patrol and the Teen Titans.

Beast Boy has appeared in numerous cartoon television shows, TV, and films, including as one of the Teen Titans in Cartoon Network's eponymous series, voiced by Greg Cipes, who also provides the character's voice in Teen Titans Go!, Young Justice, and Beast Boy: Lone Wolf. Gar Logan made his live adaptation debut in the DC Universe and HBO Max series Titans, played by Ryan Potter.

== Publication history ==
The first DC Comics shapeshifter named Beast Boy, unrelated to Garfield Logan, first appeared in the Legion of Super-Heroes feature in Adventure Comics #324 (September 1964) as part of a team called the Legion of Super-Outlaws, which was made up of characters suggested by fans and designed by John Forte. Thomas Reimondo was credited for the suggestion of this Beast Boy. He was one of the young super-heroes of the planet Lallor, who turned villain and was killed off in #339 (December 1965), just after Garfield Logan's first appearance in the November 1965 issue of Doom Patrol. This Beast Boy was allowed a last-minute reformation and heroic death.

Created by writer Arnold Drake and artist Bob Brown, the Garfield Logan with whom readers would become more familiar made his first appearance in Doom Patrol #99 (November 1965).

Drake spoke on the genesis of the character, stating:

"We wanted to have a character who could assume many different animal forms, and also wanted a kid in the strip, someone the kids could relate to. They were starting to talk back to their elders. They were starting to make their elders earn their respect. So Beast Boy was an attempt to picture what I thought was happening among some of the young people."

== Fictional character biography ==
As a young child, Garfield Logan lived with his scientist parents in Africa, who were developing "reverse evolution" to bring back extinct creatures. The Logans worked with Samuel Register, a scientist who would later become the villain Zookeeper. Garfield contracted a rare illness called Sakutia, which is lethal to every species except the green monkey. To save his life, his father used an untested science experiment to change him into a green monkey for 24 hours so that the virus could die out. The serum had the unintended effect of permanently turning his skin, eyes, and hair green and granting him the ability to transform into any animal of his choice, which also shared his pigmentation. His parents later died in a boating accident; to this day, Garfield believes he could have prevented their deaths. After he is rescued from two kidnappers who forced him to use his powers to help them in their crimes, Garfield is left under the care of a court-appointed guardian, the despicable Nicholas Galtry. Galtry realizes that his embezzlement from the Logan estate will be exposed when Garfield reaches maturity and receives his inheritance, and thus plots to kill Garfield. The villains he hires to kill Garfield are stopped by the Doom Patrol; Elasti-Girl and her husband Steve Dayton expose Galtry's embezzlement and adopt Garfield. Garfield later joins the Doom Patrol. His uniform includes a purple cowl, and he takes the code name Beast Boy. During his tenure with the Doom Patrol, Garfield has a romantic relationship with a girl from his high school named Frost. After he saves her from Galtry (then using the alias "Arsenal"), the relationship dissolves. Later, Beast Boy is deeply affected by the deaths of the Doom Patrol.

Cover of Tales of the New Teen Titans #3 (August 1982). Art by George Pérez.

=== Joining the Titans ===
He later uses both his lime green skin and shape-shifting powers to play an extraterrestrial character on a science-fiction television series, Space Trek: 2022, but it is soon cancelled due to lawsuits from both Star Trek and Space: 1999. During its run, Garfield joins the West Coast team of the Teen Titans (known as Titans West) and is later part of the New Teen Titans assembled by Dick Grayson (Robin) and Raven. By this time, Garfield has taken the name Changeling. This name change is not explained until a later flashback revealed that a new version of an old Doom Patrol enemy, Arsenal (from DP #113, August 1967), the identity this time assumed by Gar's ex-guardian Nicholas Galtry, mocked the name "Beast Boy" so much that he ruined it for him. He remains with various incarnations of the team and forms a close friendship with Cyborg.

Garfield's character is often used as comic relief through his joking and "wise cracking". However, this is only a facade, as he uses humour to hide a deep inner pain. Garfield has suffered many hardships in his life, some described previously. Other notable incidents include: during his time with the New Teen Titans, Garfield's stepfather was discovered to have been driven mad by the helmet which was central to his powers, and when Garfield fell in love with Terra, a girl with earth-manipulating powers and fellow Teen Titans member, who turned out to be a spy working for the assassin Deathstroke and who is eventually killed. Despite all his struggles, Garfield is friendly, humorous and upbeat. Like most of the other founding members of the New Teen Titans (including Nightwing), he considers the group to be his family and the people to whom he will always be closest. Though he often grapples with being taken seriously and an inferiority complex, Garfield loves and trusts his former teammates completely.

=== Limited series and Titans West ===
Seeking to resume his acting career, Changeling leaves the Titans and moves to Los Angeles to live with his screenwriter cousin Matt. Failing to find any serious work, Gar attempts to clear his name after having been framed for a series of murders around the city. He eventually discovers that the real culprit is Gemini, the daughter of Madame Rouge. Blaming Gar for her mother's death, Gemini reveals that she has hired a pair of mercenaries known as Fear and Loathing to kidnap Tim Bender and Vicky Valiant, Gar's former Space Trek: 2022 co-stars. With the bound and gagged actors in tow, Gemini attempts to flee, only to be defeated by the combined might of Beast Boy (who had decided to return to this code name at this time) and his former Titans West teammate Bette Kane. Once again in the public eye, Gar decides to ignore his newfound celebrity status and resume his superhero career. Along with Bette and Matt, Gar purchases a new apartment. While accompanying Bette to Tokyo for a tennis match, Gar is possessed by a Tengu, but is freed by Japanese superhero Bushido. Following a failed attempt to recreate "Titans West" as "Titans L.A.", as recounted in Titans Secret Files #2 (October 2000), Garfield rejoins the main team.

=== Mentor ===
Following the apparent death of Donna Troy, the Titans and Young Justice both disband. Moving back to San Francisco, Cyborg, Starfire, and Beast Boy decide to form a new team of Teen Titans, acting as mentors to the former members of Young Justice. During Infinite Crisis, Beast Boy assembles a team of past and present Titans to battle Superboy-Prime. Despite a valiant effort, the Titans are easily defeated.

=== "Infinite Crisis" and 52 ===
Beast Boy is present as a member of the team during the events of the 2005–2006 storyline "Infinite Crisis".

In the 2006 - 2007 weekly series 52, following the death of Superboy (Conner Kent), Wonder Girl and Robin, Cyborg, and Starfire leave the team, and Beast Boy takes the role of leader. Beast Boy recruits new Titan members, but the new teenage superheroes are more interested in their fame than seeking true justice. When Steel calls the Titans for help, most of the Titans abandons the team, leaving only Beast Boy, Raven, and Zatara. Beast Boy manages to recruit Aquagirl, and Offspring, and the new team aid Steel on a raid on Lexcorp. Beast Boy also participated in World War III. Due to Beast Boy's effort, the Teen Titans returns to its normal state after Wonder Girl and Robin's return.

=== "One Year Later" ===
While the events of Infinite Crisis unfold, details of Beast Boy's life "One Year Later" are revealed in the current Teen Titans comic book. Teen Titans vol. 3 #34 (May 2006) shows scenes from the year between the conclusion of Infinite Crisis and One Year Later, from the damaged Cyborg's POV. Garfield leads the Teen Titans, before quitting the team following his breakup with Raven. He then rejoins his original team, the Doom Patrol, saying that the team does not need his help and that Robin can handle leadership. He is also feeling uneasy about remaining in a team without Cyborg. After Cyborg awakens, Beast Boy and the rest of the Doom Patrol help the Titans fight off the Brotherhood of Evil, who have managed to clone the Brain. The clone is a failure, and Monsieur Mallah ends up tearing his head off so that he can preserve his master's brain.

After returning, Beast Boy is infuriated to discover that the Chief has been manipulating them and trying to do the same to Kid Devil. Garfield and his partners stand up to the Chief and make him step down as the Doom Patrol's leader. Beast Boy stays with his old team, saying that they still need him; however, he does answer a call from Raven to help the Titans combat Titans East. Raven later hints that she still loves Garfield and offers to help him heal after the battle with Deathstroke, but Garfield remains uncertain.

=== Titans ===
In Titans vol. 2 #1 (2008), Gar is attacked by Trigon, who floods his room with fire and brimstone. In retaliation, Gar joins the new Titans team, wearing a costume similar to his old Changeling uniform. In later issues, the group is attacked by the Children of Trigon, who use Garfield's suppressed anger and rage against Raven, who is also affected in the same manner. The two attack the other, but the fight is eventually broken up when the Titans begin to recover from the attack.

Raven's three half-brothers then use her and Gar, transforming him into a demonic beast, to act as keys to open a portal to Trigon's realm. Raven uses her own power to influence greed in others to make her half-brothers steal what little power Trigon had left. The portal is closed, and Trigon's sons, believing they have gained great power, leave the scene, returning Gar to normal.

Following this, the team has settled themselves down at Titans Tower (supposedly the New York base), where they attempt to recover from recent events. Raven and Beast Boy go out together on a "not-a-date". During this, Raven reveals that since she faced her brothers, she has begun to feel as if she is losing control and slipping back under the thrall of her father's powers. Although Beast Boy rejects the idea, he is blind-sided as Raven gives in to her darker side, under the influence of her half-brothers' coaxing. Using her teleporting powers, she and the Sons of Trigon vanish, leaving a distraught Beast Boy behind to warn the others.

The Titans are later able to save Raven, using a gem that she had entrusted to Donna Troy. The gem carried a piece of her pure-soul self, which then cleansed the evil of Raven. Afterwards, Raven gave Beast Boy and the rest of the team similar magical items in case she should ever be corrupted again. Raven later turns down Beast Boy's attempts to reconcile completely as a couple, although there are hints that she deeply regrets this but views it as a necessity for Beast Boy's safety.

=== Return to Teen Titans ===
After Beast Boy is once again rejected by Raven, Cyborg gives him a talk about his need to act like a clown while around his old friends, telling him that if he ever wants to get on with his life, he needs to forget about the past and move forward. Still depressed, Gar goes to San Francisco after being asked to fill in for Owlman at a superhero convention. After causing a scene by attacking a man dressed in a Deathstroke mask, Gar leaves the convention in a huff, only to stumble upon a massive battle between the Teen Titans and Cinderblock. Despite protests from the team's struggling leader Wonder Girl, Beast Boy shows true leadership by saving the life of Bombshell and stopping Static from making a suicidal charge against the seemingly unbreakable villain. With Beast Boy's help, the Teen Titans defeat Cinderblock, with Gar leaving and telling them to take all the credit. Upon returning home, Beast Boy decides to take Cyborg's advice about moving forward, resolving to move to San Francisco and take over the leadership of the Teen Titans.

During the events of the 2009–2010 storyline "Blackest Night", Beast Boy faces Terra again after she is reanimated as a Black Lantern. She attempts to lull him into a false sense of security, but Gar ultimately attacks her and severs her arm after her fellow Lanterns attack the other Titans.

After the Blackest Night ends, Beast Boy and Wonder Girl lead the Titans to Dakota City after Static is kidnapped by Holocaust, a metahuman crime lord. Throughout the rescue mission, Beast Boy and Wonder Girl clash over who is actually running the team, with Gar even going so far as to call Cyborg (who is now a member of the Justice League) for help behind Cassie's back. During the final battle with Holocaust, Cyborg arrives with Superboy and Kid Flash in tow, and, close to defeat, Holocaust desperately tries to kill all of the Titans by using his pyrokinetic abilities to burn the building they are in to the ground. Beast Boy ultimately rescues his teammates by transforming into a phoenix, with Cyborg later telling him how proud he is of him.

In the final issue of this incarnation of the Titans, Superboy-Prime and his Legion of Doom attack Titan's Tower. Raven stops Kid Flash just before he can kill Inertia. Then she reveals her soul-self to Headcase, terrifying and defeating him. After the Legion of Doom is defeated and Superboy-Prime is bound to the Source Wall, Beast Boy and Raven have a talk about her difficulty in reading Solstice's emotions, and their encounter with Headcase. Eventually, Raven starts to open up about her true feelings. While it was her inner darkness that scarred her entire life, she was even more frightened of what her love for Beast Boy might cause her to do. Beast Boy makes it clear he doesn't want to escape from any part of her. Touched, Raven decides that she needs to embrace the positive feelings inside her rather than just her negative ones. Beast Boy assures her this is part of being human, and points out, "I think you've worried enough about the bad....so why don't we focus on the good for a change?" With that, they share a heartfelt kiss to renew their relationship and ultimately embrace their love for each other.

=== The New 52 ===
Beast Boy on the cover of The Ravagers #4, his first appearance as part of the New 52, showing his red appearance

In September 2011, The New 52 rebooted DC's continuity. In this new timeline, Garfield is first reintroduced through a passing reference in Red Hood and the Outlaws #1. The reference includes Cyborg, Garth, Nightwing, Lilith and a new unseen character named Dustin, who are established to be members of a team that Starfire seemingly no longer remembers.

==== The Ravagers ====
The first appearance of Beast Boy in The New 52 shows him as a member of the new superhero team The Ravagers, led by Caitlin Fairchild. Beast Boy is depicted as having red skin instead of green due to his connection to the Red, an extradimensional power source that connects all animal life. Also in the Ravagers team are Terra, Thunder and Lightning, and a new character Ridge. In The New 52, the Ravagers are a group of super-powered teens who have escaped the plans of Harvest in The Culling. The team was formed after the Teen Titans and the Legionnaires stuck in the present day were abducted by Harvest, and then later stopped the villain and escaped.

Beast Boy and Terra develop a strong bond with each other during imprisonment in a place named The Colony, where Harvest forces super-powered teenagers to fight each other and undergo experiments to find the strongest among them. The selected few are intended as a team to serve the organization N.O.W.H.E.R.E. in perfidy. It was in one of their experiments that Gar revealed his powers for the first time in The New 52 continuity. In this place, Beast Boy is defended by Terra from being attacked by other super-powered prisoners, returning the favor later when Terra is in danger.

Once free of the Colony, Terra and Beast Boy separated from the rest of their fellow Ravagers, hiding together in a cave. Later Beast Boy started having nightmares with the remaining Ravagers all covered with blood. It was later revealed that the one causing his nightmares was Brother Blood as he was targeting the one who could be used as a key to his master gain access to the Red. Due to his connection with The Red, Beast Boy was the only one who could sense the evil intents of Blood and therefore the key Blood was looking for. After sensing his presence, Beast Boy convinced Terra to help the remaining Ravagers who were captured by Blood to be used as a sacrifice in his ritual and they eventually manage to stop and defeat Blood.

After those events Fairchild led the team to a place in Los Angeles. There the team is confronted by Superboy and Niles Caulder. Caulder is introduced as a long time known of Fairchild and is also implied that Caulder has known Beast Boy although their connection has not been explored. Later, Fairchild and Caulder introduce the team to a deep underground science and engineering facility, which provides headquarters and combat training for the team in their campaign against N.O.W.H.E.R.E. as Harvest sends Rose Wilson and Warblade to recapture them.

As the series progresses Beast Boy and Terra start developing romantic feelings for each other as Beast Boy finally finds someone who cared for him in the middle of the countless tortures and painful experiments he has suffered back in the Colony. Later, Terra opens up her feelings for Gar teasing him: "Why in the world haven't you tried to kiss me yet?" as they share a passionate kiss. After the kiss they become a couple.

With Rose and Warblade having difficulty capturing the Ravagers, Harvest makes a deal with Deathstroke to hunt down the Ravagers and attack each one using a special weapon called the Abeo Blade. Succeeding in invading Caulder's place, Deathstroke manages to "kill" Ridge (in his human form - a child), Caulder himself, Thunder and Lightning using the weapon, and also cuts Warblade's head off. As Deathstroke chooses an already injured Beast Boy as his next victim, a desperate Terra tries to stop him in fear of losing Gar. But her attempt falls short as she is stabbed and burned by Deathstroke's Abeo Blade. As a horrified Garfield sees Terra burning right before his eyes, he transforms into a wolf and delivers Deathstroke a hard blow in the face which tears off his mask and bloodies his nose and mouth. Still in a berserk state, Beast Boy turns into a dinosaur and lashes at Deathstroke, causing the support beam to collapse and bury him in rubble. After that Deathstroke leaves an unconscious and bloodied Beast Boy on the ground believing that he is dead. After the battle with Beast Boy, Deathstroke proceeds and stabs Rose and Fairchild with the Abeo Blade. It is later revealed that the Abeo Blade was a teleportation device that returned the Ravagers to the Colony.

==== Teen Titans ====
As an almost dead Beast Boy is left on the remains of the facility he is approached by Raven. After being touched by her, Beast Boy awakens and asks if Harvest sent her to retrieve him. She apologizes stating that she brought him into the fray much sooner than she expected. Raven mind-controls him and teleports them to New York, where she uses him as her minion in the battle of her father Trigon and the Teen Titans. Beast Boy, under Raven's influence, pulls the Titans and Psimon away from the fight. When Psimon kills the police reinforcements, Beast Boy sees it and squeezes him hard, resulting the both of them to cancel out each other's powers and rendering them unconscious.

After regaining consciousness Beast Boy sides with the Titans in their fight against Trigon and his sons in New York City. Succeeding their first encounter and battle against Trigon, Beast Boy decides to leave the group to assist Bunker who decides to see his boyfriend, who has recently awakened from a coma.

==== Forever Evil ====
After the departure of the two, the Titans confront Johnny Quick, a member of the Crime Syndicate to arrive from Earth-3 at the conclusion of the "Trinity War" event. As a result, the Titans got separated and tossed in the time stream. Due to this, Red Robin, Wonder Girl and Superboy (Conner Kent) were sent 20 years in the future and Red Robin decides to lead the rest to the Batcave of the future to get answers. They get there only to see that almost everything in there is destroyed, including the deaths of Batman and Alfred Pennyworth. Then the group is suddenly teleported to the Justice League Watchtower where Garfield, now labeled as Beast Man (and green), confronts them and informs that he is the last Justice Leaguer standing. He also shows the others that he along with Rose Wilson, are training superpowered teenagers to become a team themselves. In a private conversation with Red Robin, Gar reveals the events that led to the situation of this future is Jon Lane Kent (the son of Superman and Lois Lane) went on rampage killing all metahumans, also states that Superboy is a clone of Jon, and finally tells Red Robin that his future self entrusted on him as Garfield was able to know his name, a thing that no other Titan knew, and that was all part of future Tim's plan to use Garfield as the source of this information for his past self, so he might be able to change the course of the future. After that Garfield with Rose's help, rescue an injured and unconscious Jon, due to a clash with Conner. Now with Jon treated but still unconscious, even though Gar and Rose express their desire to kill him for all the things he has done, they put in action a plan that involves changing the places of Conner and Jon as Superboy, dressing the latter in a copy of Conner's costume as another attempt to avoid those terrible events from happening again. With the return of Red Robin and Wonder Girl, now with Raven at their side, the plan is fulfilled as the three Titans departed with Jon instead of Conner. Right after they leave, Rose questions Garfield if it was the right thing to do, after stating that he puts "way too much faith in the Titans", like he has always been which Gar responds: "I damn well hope so Rose. I damn well hope so". It is also revealed that in this timeline Rose and Garfield are wife and husband and their daughter named Red, is one of the teens in training.

=== DC Rebirth/Infinite Frontier ===
Beast Boy once again joins the Teen Titans led by Damian Wayne along with Starfire, Raven, and Kid Flash.

Following Dark Nights: Metal and Justice League: No Justice, the breaching of the Source Wall causes the powers of many of Earth's metahuman population to become erratic. In Beast Boy's case, he occasionally transforms into a monstrous, hulking version of himself, often going on rampages until he can regain his senses. Wanting to assist other metahumans affected by the Source Wall like himself, he joins Nightwing's new incarnation of the Titans, joining with Raven, Miss Martian, Donna Troy, and Steel. Following a confrontation between the Titans and Mother Blood, Beast Boy gains control over his new transformation.

=== Dawn of DC ===
==== Titans: Beast World ====
During a battle against a parasitic alien entity known as the "Necrostar", Beast Boy transforms himself into a "Garro", a creature that resembles Starro and sends out starfish spores of his own to free humans infected by the Necrostar. After Beast Boy sends the Necrostar to a distant nebula by the help of Cyborg, Doctor Hate (a being created by Amanda Waller during "Knight Terrors") knocks Cyborg unconscious and seemingly erases Beast Boy's memories from Garro. Garro's spores spread across the world, infecting people and transforming them into feral humanoid animals. Donna Troy tries to use her Lasso of Persuasion on Garro in an effort to restore Beast Boy's mind, but Waller transports Chunk into his body, seemingly killing them both. Despite his death, Garro's spores remain active.

The Titans later realize that the spores contained Beast Boy's consciousness and that by destroying them they would be slowly indirectly killing him. After managing to free all the mutated humans from the spores, they collect them in the Titans Tower, where the spores slowly reformed back into Beast Boy, who has lost most of his consciousness. The Titans managed to make Beast Boy regain his memories by fusing his old self with his current body. The events left a deep mark on him, but later when Batman talked to him, he convinced Beast Boy that despite everything, he saved the world and is still a hero.

== Powers and abilities ==
Beast Boy has the ability to morph and transform into any animal that he has seen himself or has seen in an illustration (as is the case when he shapeshifts into an animal such as an extinct dinosaur). These transformations take only 1 second and Beast Boy has demonstrated that he is capable of rapidly changing his form with little or no effort expended. As a corollary to this power, he can transform back into his default form if an external force, like magic, transforms him into an animal. His power enables him to completely alter his body mass, being able to take the shape of animals far larger and heavier than himself, such as an elephant, a hippopotamus, or a Tyrannosaurus rex (though until recent stories, such larger forms would physically exhaust him), or smaller and lighter animals such as mice, arachnids and insects. As a result of his rapidly changing genetic structure and mass, Beast Boy has an increased healing factor comparable to that of the Creeper and Deathstroke, allowing him to heal from bullet wounds, burns, and broken bones in a matter of seconds, and in some story lines regrow entire limbs. He cannot change or return to a form if the space he occupies is too small and he cannot normally break through confines (as seen when he attempts to transform into a Tyrannosaurus rex underneath a bridge and hits his head, instantly aborting the transformation). His power also enables him to radically alter his body structure and take forms of animals without limbs, like snakes, or those without skeletons like a jellyfish. In two notable instances, he has even taken the form of multiple individuals simultaneously (a swarm of fireflies and a mass of barnacles).

Beast Boy's transformations have not been limited to Earth life forms. When on a rescue mission in the Vegan system to free Starfire, he easily transformed into a Gordanian, a reptilian alien native to the system, to sneak Robin and Cyborg onto a warship. In the "Who is Wonder Girl?" story arc, he was able to infiltrate another alien world after being shown a green-skinned creature native to the planet; he had some difficulty with this change, claiming that Earth-animal forms he knew instinctively, but was successful in the transformation. When he pursued Madame Rouge in revenge for her role in killing his foster mother, Rita Farr, he began transforming into creatures that do not exist, products of his subconscious rage against the villainess.

While an animal, he gains all of the physical abilities, attributes, and characteristics of said animal, such as greatly enhanced superhuman strength (a gorilla), superhuman speed (a cheetah), and enhanced durability (a turtle), and abilities such as flight (various birds), and aquatic breathing (various fish). He can even gain the specific poisons and toxins produced by specific snakes. He also gains the ability to survive or otherwise live in the same hostile environments some animals can, as seen in one comic where he morphs into a parasitic worm to become resistant to the stomach acid and immune system of Brother Blood when he dived into the villain's intestinal tract to retrieve Raven's chakra. While in animal form, Beast Boy retains his human intellect, memories, and the ability to speak. No matter what form he takes, his skin, hair, and eyes remain green, making most of his animal forms easy to distinguish from real animals of that species. In the character's early appearances, his animal forms had normal coloration, with only their head remaining green.

When Raven implanted Garfield with an evil seed of her father Trigon, he began to transform into more demon-like creatures. Eventually, he found himself more comfortable in these horrific shapes than as a human, and stayed shifted. After becoming completely corrupted by the evil seed, he was used by Raven and Trigon, but eventually returned to normal. Titans vol. 4 #4 reveals that a small part of that seed still remains within him, which Trigon's sons manipulate, using the demonic energies to open the portal to Trigon's realm.

According to Marv Wolfman and George Pérez, the reason Garfield is never seen shapeshifting into other humans, although his powers should allow it, is because any human he turns into would be green and there would be no point for him to use that ability unless he was turning into someone like the Hulk.

In the series Tales of the Teen Titans, it is implied that Garfield also has unexplored psionic abilities. Although Mento's psionic helmet is only capable of amplifying its user's psionic abilities, Garfield was shown to successfully use it to trick the Teen Titans into perceiving him as Slade.

At one point, he has displayed an ability to read lips, which he used to discover an assassination plot that Nicholas Galtry devised against him.

== Other versions ==
Many alternate universe versions of Beast Boy have appeared throughout the character's publication history. In "Titans Tomorrow", a future version of Beast Boy takes the name Animal Man and is able to use more than one animal's abilities at once. In Kingdom Come, the character is known as Menagerie and is able to transform into mythical creatures. Hawkbeast, a composite character based on Beast Boy and Hawkman, appears in Superman/Batman.

== In other media ==
=== Television ===
Beast Boy in Teen Titans Go!

- Beast Boy appears in Teen Titans (2003), voiced by Greg Cipes. This version is a member of the eponymous team and former member of the Doom Patrol who lacks the ability to speak while transformed.
- Beast Boy makes a cameo appearance in the Batman: The Brave and the Bold episode "The Last Patrol!" as part of a poster advertising a carnival's freak show.
- Beast Boy appears in Young Justice, voiced by Logan Grove in the first two seasons and again by Greg Cipes in the third and fourth seasons. This version previously lived with his mother Marie Logan, who runs the Logan Animal Sanctuary at the border of Qurac and Bialya. While the Team are visiting Qurac for a mission, Garfield is critically injured in an attack on the sanctuary. To save his life, Miss Martian gives him a blood transfusion, which turns his skin green and gives him shapeshifting abilities. In between the first and second seasons, Garfield worked with the Doom Patrol, of which his godmother Rita Farr was a member, before most of them were killed during a mission and Queen Bee murdered Marie. As of the second season, Garfield has taken the name Beast Boy and joined the Team. In the third season, he has left the Team due in part to his legal guardian and fellow surviving Doom Patrol member Steve Dayton, entered a relationship with Queen Perdita of Vlatava, became a celebrity, star of the TV series Space Trek 3016, and an advocate for anti-metahuman trafficking as part of Dayton's scheme to exploit Garfield. Eventually, a disgruntled Garfield successfully sues Dayton for emancipation and discovers he was chosen by a monkey god, with the blood transfusion serving as a catalyst for his transformation. With Miss Martian's help, Garfield realizes he was running from the trauma of losing loved ones and forms the Outsiders. In the fourth season, he has depression following Superboy's apparent death, leading to him breaking up with Perdita and quitting his acting career and the Outsiders, though he eventually recovers upon discovering Superboy is alive and adopts an emotional support Corgi named Wingman.
- Beast Boy appears in the "New Teen Titans" segment of DC Nation Shorts, voiced again by Greg Cipes.
- Beast Boy appears in Teen Titans Go! (2013), voiced again by Greg Cipes (seasons 1–9). Similarly to the Teen Titans (2003) incarnation, this version is a member of the Teen Titans and former member of the Doom Patrol. Additionally, he is more laid-back than most incarnations, is in a relationship with Raven, and received his powers from the Chief, who used an experimental monkey serum on him when he was a baby. In 2025, Cipes stated that he was fired from his role as Beast Boy by Warner Bros shortly after he was diagnosed with Parkinson's disease and would be replaced with a new voice actor. However, sources claimed he was recast due to creative differences.
  - Additionally, the Teen Titans (2003) incarnation of Beast Boy appears in the episode "The Academy" via archival footage.
- Beast Boy makes a non-speaking cameo appearance in a DC Super Friends short.
- Garfield "Gar" Logan appears in Titans, portrayed by Ryan Potter. Introduced as a member of the Doom Patrol, this version suffered from a primate-related disease until he received a serum administered by Niles Caulder, which granted Gar his powers. Additionally, he could only shapeshift into a tiger at first and lacks a "supersuit" capable of transforming with him, leaving him naked upon reverting to human form. With encouragement from his fellow Doom Patrol members, Gar leaves them to live his own life and joins Dick Grayson and Kory Anders in protecting Rachel Roth, with whom he becomes close. By the fourth season, S.T.A.R. Labs gives Beast Boy special equipment that enables him to use his powers without having to remove his clothes.
  - Additionally, the Teen Titans Go! (2013) incarnation of Beast Boy makes a cameo appearance in the episode "Dude, Where's My Gar?" via archival footage.
- Beast Boy appears in DC Super Hero Girls (2019), voiced by Kari Wahlgren.
- Garfield Logan makes a cameo appearance in the Harley Quinn episode "The Horse and the Sparrow".
- Beast Boy appears in Beast Boy: Lone Wolf, voiced again by Greg Cipes.

=== Film ===
- The Teen Titans (2003) incarnation of Beast Boy appears in Teen Titans: Trouble in Tokyo (2006), voiced again by Greg Cipes.
- Beast Boy appears in films set in the DC Animated Movie Universe (DCAMU), voiced by Brandon Soo Hoo. This version is a member of the Teen Titans who, in addition to regular animals, is capable of transforming into a variation of the Teen Titans (2003) incarnation's super-werewolf form from the episode "The Beast Within" and a number of other-dimensional creatures. In Justice League Dark: Apokolips War, Beast Boy is killed by Paradooms.
- Beast Boy appears in Lego DC Comics Super Heroes: Justice League: Gotham City Breakout, voiced again by Greg Cipes.
- The Teen Titans Go! (2013) incarnation of Beast Boy appears in Teen Titans Go! To the Movies, voiced again by Greg Cipes.
- The Teen Titans Go! (2013) and Teen Titans (2003) incarnations of Beast Boy appear in Teen Titans Go! vs. Teen Titans, with both voiced again by Greg Cipes. Additionally, several alternate universe variants of Beast Boy appear throughout the film, including his counterparts from Tiny Titans, the New Teen Titans comic, and the DCAMU.
- The Teen Titans Go! (2013) incarnation of Beast Boy appears in Teen Titans Go! & DC Super Hero Girls: Mayhem in the Multiverse, voiced again by Greg Cipes.
- Beast Boy makes a non-speaking cameo appearance in Batman and Superman: Battle of the Super Sons.

=== Video games ===
- Beast Boy appears as a playable character in Teen Titans (2005), voiced again by Greg Cipes.
- Beast Boy appears as a playable character in Teen Titans (2006). This version is a member of the eponymous team.
- Beast Boy appears in DC Universe Online, voiced by Josh Meyer. This version is a member of the Teen Titans.
- The Young Justice incarnation of Beast Boy appears as a playable character in Young Justice: Legacy, voiced by Jason Spisak.
- The classic, pre-New 52, and New 52 incarnations of Beast Boy appear as character summons in Scribblenauts Unmasked: A DC Comics Adventure. This version is capable of flying without needing to transform into an animal that can do so.
- Beast Boy appears as a playable character in Lego Batman 3: Beyond Gotham, voiced by Nolan North.
- The Teen Titans Go! (2013) incarnation of Beast Boy appears as a playable character in Lego Dimensions, voiced again by Greg Cipes.
- Beast Boy appears in Teeny Titans, voiced again by Greg Cipes.
- Beast Boy makes a non-speaking cameo appearance in Starfire's ending in Injustice 2 as a member of the Teen Titans who was killed years prior.
- Beast Boy appears as a playable character and boss in Lego DC Super-Villains, voiced again by Greg Cipes.
- Beast Boy appears as a cosmetic skin in Fortnite Battle Royale.

=== Miscellaneous ===
- The Teen Titans (2003) incarnation of Beast Boy appears in Teen Titans Go! (2004). Here, it is revealed that he joined the Doom Patrol after breaking into their quarters and impressing them while evading capture, subsequently developing a fear of being rejected by them. Additionally, Robby Reed unknowingly borrows Beast Boy's powers and goes by the name Changeling.
- Beast Boy appears in issue #7 of the Batman: The Brave and the Bold tie-in comic series as a member of the Doom Patrol.
- Beast Boy appears in the Injustice: Gods Among Us prequel comic as a member of the Teen Titans who resents former team leader Nightwing for abandoning them to join the Justice League before he is killed when the Joker destroys Metropolis.
- Beast Boy appears in DC Super Hero Girls (2015) and its tie-in films, voiced again by Greg Cipes. This version is a student at Super Hero High.
- Beast Boy appears in DC X Sonic the Hedgehog.
