= Doom Patrol (TV series) =

2019 American superhero television series

- Genre: Black comedy; Drama; Science fiction; Superhero
- Based on: Doom Patrol by: Arnold Drake; Bob Haney; Bruno Premiani
- Developed by: Jeremy Carver
- Showrunner: Jeremy Carver
- Starring: Diane Guerrero; April Bowlby; Alan Tudyk; Matt Bomer; Brendan Fraser; Timothy Dalton; Joivan Wade; Skye Roberts; Riley Shanahan; Matthew Zuk; Michelle Gomez
- Narrated by: Alan Tudyk (season 1)
- Composers: Clint Mansell; Kevin Kiner
- Country of origin: United States
- Original language: English
- No. of seasons: 4
- No. of episodes: 46

Production
- Executive producers: Glen Winter; Geoff Johns; Chris Dingess; Sarah Schechter; Greg Berlanti; Jeremy Carver; Tamara Becher-Wilkinson
- Cinematography: Christopher Manley; Noah Greenberg; Magdalena Górka; Scott Winig; Scott Peck; John C. Newby
- Editors: Harry Jierjian; Brian Wessel; Sara Mineo; Brandon Hwang; Marc Pattavina; Arman Tahmizyan; JD Dawson; Charissa Sanjarernsuithikul; Leigh Dodson; Jaron Downs; Damian Gomez; Imelda Betiong; Katie Ruzicka; Justin Guerrieri
- Running time: 38–58 minutes
- Production companies: Berlanti Productions; Jeremy Carver Productions; DC Entertainment; Warner Bros. Television

Original release
- Network: DC Universe
- Release: February 15, 2019 – August 6, 2020
- Network: HBO Max
- Release: June 25, 2020 – January 5, 2023
- Network: Max
- Release: October 12 – November 9, 2023

Related
- Titans

Doom Patrol is an American superhero television series developed by Jeremy Carver. Based on the DC Comics superhero team of the same name, the series features Jane (Diane Guerrero), Rita Farr (April Bowlby), Vic Stone (Joivan Wade), Larry Trainor (Matt Bomer and Matthew Zuk), Cliff Steele (Brendan Fraser and Riley Shanahan), the Chief (Timothy Dalton), and Madame Rouge (Michelle Gomez) as the members of the eponymous Doom Patrol. Although Bowlby, Bomer, and Fraser reprise their roles from the series Titans, the two shows are set in separate continuities.

The series premiered on February 15, 2019, exclusively for the DC Universe streaming service. The second season aired on both DC Universe and HBO Max, with the two streaming services releasing episodes simultaneously on June 25, 2020. A third season, released exclusively on HBO Max, premiered on September 23, 2021. The fourth and final season premiered on December 8, 2022, and concluded on November 9, 2023.

== Plot ==
Doom Patrol follows the unlikely heroes of the eponymous team who all received their powers through tragic circumstances and are generally shunned by society. Most members of the team were treated by Niles Caulder, a medical doctor who gave them residence in his mansion to help protect them from the outside world. Their name derives from an earlier Doom Patrol team that was formed by the Chief.

The first members of the Doom Patrol to be introduced in the series are Jane, the dominant identity of a traumatized woman with dissociative identity disorder; Rita Farr, who struggles to prevent her body from turning to a gelatinous state; Larry Trainor, who has an entity of negative energy living inside him; and Cliff Steele, whose brain was placed in a robot body following a car crash. The team is later joined by cybernetically enhanced superhero Vic Stone and shapeshifter Madame Rouge.

In the first season, the Chief is captured by the malevolent Mr. Nobody, sending the Doom Patrol on a journey to rescue him. Along the way, they discover secrets about themselves and the Chief, who they eventually learn is responsible for the tragic events that gave them their powers.

The second season sees the Doom Patrol joined by Dorothy Spinner, the Chief's daughter who possesses the ability to bring her imaginary friends to life. While the members of the Doom Patrol face their own personal dilemmas and contend with the truth about the Chief, Dorothy inadvertently endangers the world when her powers threaten to unleash an ancient entity known as the Candlemaker.

In the third season, Dorothy's battle with the Candlemaker reaches its climax and the Doom Patrol suffers a tragic loss when the Chief finally dies of old age. However, the Doom Patrol's ally Willoughby Kipling salvages Chief's head, stating that his time isn't over yet. In the aftermath, the team go their separate ways as they struggle with their identities when the arrival of Madame Rouge in a time machine sets them on a new path as well as having an encounter with the Brotherhood of Evil.

In the fourth and final season, the Doom Patrol begin doing more heroic activities while dealing with the coming of Immortus and the imminent Buttpocalypse.

== Cast and characters ==
=== Main ===
- Diane Guerrero as Jane: The dominant identity of Kay Challis, created to protect her. She and the other identities received their own unique powers from an experiment Kay was involuntarily subjected to. Leela Owen portrays the teenage version of the character while in her Miranda identity.
  - Guerrero also portrays two of Kay's other identities: Driver 8, who manages the transportation in Kay's subconsciousness, and Karen, who possesses mind control powers.
- April Bowlby as Rita Farr / Elasti-Woman: A former Hollywood actress, born Gertrude Cramp, whose cellular structure was altered into a gelatinous state after being exposed to an underwater toxic gas. Her powers allow her to change her body shape, but also cause her to struggle with maintaining a solid form. Lana Jean Turner portrays Rita as a child.
- Alan Tudyk as Eric Morden / Mr. Nobody (season 1): An omnipresent supervillain capable of traveling through dimensions and altering reality. Aware of being in a television series because of his abilities, he often breaks the fourth wall and manipulates events through his narration. Ed Asner portrays Mr. Nobody in his hospital patient disguise.
- Matt Bomer and Matthew Zuk as Larry Trainor / Negative Man: A former United States Air Force pilot with a negative energy entity living inside him. Disfigured from the plane crash that ensued when he made contact with the negative spirit, he is covered in special bandages to prevent the spread of the radioactivity emanating from his body. Bomer voices the character and appears as Larry without bandages, while Zuk physically portrays the bandaged Larry. Braxton Alexander portrays Larry as a child.
- Brendan Fraser and Riley Shanahan as Cliff Steele / Robotman: A cyborg and former NASCAR driver whose brain was transplanted into a robotic body after a car crash destroyed his own. Fraser voices the character and appears as the human version of Cliff, while Shanahan physically portrays him as a cyborg. Gibson Todd portrays Cliff as a child.
  - Shanahan also voices the Brain, the leader of the Brotherhood of Evil, in season 3.
- Timothy Dalton as Niles Caulder / The Chief (seasons 1–2; guest seasons 3–4): A medical doctor responsible for treating the members of the Doom Patrol and giving them residence in his mansion. Abi Monterey portrays the Chief as a child.
- Joivan Wade as Victor "Vic" Stone / Cyborg: A young, ambitious superhero who received cybernetic enhancements from his father Silas following an accident that led to his mother's death. While not a resident of Doom Manor, he joins the team because of his longtime friendship with the Chief. Braelyn Rankins portrays Vic as a child.
- Skye Roberts as Kay Challis (seasons 3–4; recurring seasons 1–2): The original identity of a young girl who developed Jane and other distinct identities from childhood trauma. Due to her experiences, she remains a child in her subconsciousness while her identities assume control of her body. When in control of her body, Kay possesses a sonic scream.
- Michelle Gomez as Laura De Mille / Madame Rouge (seasons 3–4): A shapeshifter with ties to the Chief and the Brotherhood of Evil, later becoming a member of the Doom Patrol.

=== Kay's identities ===
- Anna Lore as Penny Farthing, a timid identity.
- Stephanie Czajkowski as Hammerhead, an aggressive identity with super-strength and enhanced durability. When Hammerhead controls Crazy Jane, her skull chest tattoo appears on Crazy Jane's chest.
- Tara Lee as Lucy Fugue, an electrokinetic identity of Crazy Jane.
- Chelsea Alana Rivera as Silver Tongue, a ferrokinetic identity who creates sharp metal versions of the words that she says.
- Hannah Alline as Pretty Polly, a Gothic dress-wearing identity with Xs over her eyes.
- Jackie Goldston as the Secretary, an identity with genius-level intellect who can perform advanced tasks.
- Monica Louwerens as the voice and motion-capture of the Weird Sisters, a three-headed elderly identity.
- Helen Abell as Black Annis, a misandrist identity who guards the entrance to the well in Kay's subconsciousness.
- Sarah Borne as Baby Doll, a child-like, telekinetic identity.
- Ana Aguilar as Balladeer, an identity of Crazy Jane who often leads the mourning processions in Kay's subconsciousness.
- Catherine Carlen as Doctor Harrison, an identity of Crazy Jane with the power of persuasion.
- Samantha Marie Ware as Miranda, the former primary identity of Kay before Jane, later impersonated by Daddy.
- Shay Mack as Driller Bill, an identity with super-strength.
- Va Liu as Mama Pentecost, an identity who is fluent in many languages.

=== Recurring ===
- Julie McNiven as Sheryl Trainor (seasons 1–2), Larry's wife and the mother of his children.
- Kyle Clements as John Bowers (season 1), Larry's secret lover who also served in the Air Force. Tom Fitzpatrick portrays the character as an old man in the present.
- Phil Morris as Silas Stone, Victor's father and a scientist who rebuilt him as a cyborg. Morris also briefly portrayed Doctor Cowboy, the imaginary friend of Vic.
- Bethany Anne Lind as Clara Steele, Cliff's daughter who survived a fatal accident in 1988, and was believed to be the only survivor of her family. Sydney Kowalske played a younger Clara Steele in flashbacks.
- Mark Sheppard as Willoughby Kipling, an occult detective, chaos magician, and member of the Knights Templar.
- Curtis Armstrong as the voice of Ezekiel (season 1), a talking doomsday prophet cockroach.
- Alec Mapa as Steve Larson / Animal-Vegetable-Mineral Man (season 1), a tourist who undergoes Von Fuchs' enhancement procedure and is turned into a mismatched fusion of animal, vegetable and mineral.
- Charmin Lee as Elinore Stone (seasons 1, 3), Vic's mother and Silas' wife.
- Alimi Ballard as Joshua Clay (season 1), a metahuman and the caretaker of the original Doom Patrol.
- Tommy Snider as Ernest Franklin / Beard Hunter (seasons 1–2), a bounty hunter with the ability to track down individuals by consuming their facial hair.
- Jon Briddell as Darren Jones (seasons 1, 3–4), an agent of the Bureau of Normalcy, an organization which once experimented on Larry after his accident who is later turned into a were-butt.
- Devan Chandler Long as Flex Mentallo (seasons 1–2), a superhero and cereal mascot who can alter reality through his muscle flexes.
- Abi Monterey as Dorothy Spinner (seasons 2–4), the daughter of the Chief and a primitive woman who can bring her imaginary friends to life.
- Karen Obilom as Roni Evers (seasons 2–3), a military veteran with a mysterious past and a genderbent version of Ron Evers who Vic meets while attending a PTSD support group.
- Lex Lang as the voice of the Candlemaker (seasons 2–3), a dangerous entity who comes into contact with Dorothy and tempts her to make a wish.
- Vanessa Carter and Kat Cressida as Darling-Come-Home (season 2), one of Dorothy's imaginary friends who has a mirror-like face with glowing eyes. Carter physically portrays Darling-Come-Home and Cressida voices the character.
- Brian T. Stevenson as the voice of Herschel (season 2), Dorothy's imaginary friend who takes the form of a giant spider.
- Charity Cervantes as Isabel Feathers (seasons 2–4), a community theater actress who is cast as a character based on Rita in Micki's play. After accidentally becoming lost in the timestream because of Madame Rouge, Isabel becomes possessed by Immortus.
- Jonathan Lipow as the voice of Monsieur Mallah (season 3), an intelligent gorilla who replaced Eric Morden in the Brotherhood of Evil and acts as the Brain's second-in-command.
- Sendhil Ramamurthy as Rama / Mister 104 (season 4), a man with molecular-restructuring abilities.
- Madeline Zima as Casey Brinke / Space Case (season 4), a superheroine from Dorothy's favorite self-titled comic book series who materialized in the real world.
- Elijah Rashad Reed as Deric Hayes (season 4), an old friend of Cyborg.

An uncredited actor voices Cyborg's computer system Grid.

=== Guest ===
==== Introduced in season 1 ====
- Julian Richings as Heinrich Von Fuchs, the Nazi scientist whose experiments changed Morden into Mr. Nobody.
- Katie Gunderson as Kate Steele, Cliff's wife who perished in a car accident.
- Alan Heckner as Bump Weathers, one of Cliff's pit crew who has an affair with Kate, and later raises Clara after she is orphaned.
- Gabrielle Byndloss as Patty, a woman who Cyborg saved from a mugging.
- Chantelle Barry as the voice of Baphomet, an oracle in the form of the female horse, Falada (from the fairytale, The Goose Girl).
- Lilli Birdsell as Mother Archon, Elliot's mother and the high priestess of the lost city of Nurnheim.
- Ted Sutherland as Elliot Patterson, an 18-year-old boy who is the key to the Cult of the Unwritten Book's attempt to summon the Decreator, an interdimensional entity who will unmake the world.
- Ethan McDowell as Charles Forsythe, a member of the Bureau of Normalcy that once experimented on Larry. Ted Ferguson portrays an older Forsythe.
- Matthew Sean Blumm and Michael Harney as R.J. Steele, the father of Cliff and the grandfather of Clara. Blumm portrayed him in season one while Harney portrayed him in season two and three.
- Will Kemp and Dave Bielawski as Steve Dayton / Mento, leader of the original Doom Patrol. Kemp portrays the younger Mento and Bielawski portrays the older Mento.
- Jasmine Kaur and Madhur Jaffrey as Arani Desai / Celsius, a member of the original Doom Patrol with power over fire and ice. Kaur portrays the younger Celsius while Jaffrey portrays the older Celsius.
- Dennis Cockrum as Sydney Bloom, a film producer of Bloom Studios who Rita tries to get cast in one of his upcoming films.
- Lesa Wilson as Rhea Jones / Lodestone, a member of the original Doom Patrol with magnetic abilities. Lesa Wilson portrays the younger Lodestone while an uncredited actress portrays the older Lodestone.
- Alan Mingo Jr. as Morris Wilson / Maura Lee Karupt, a former agent of the Bureau of Normalcy-turned-crossdressing cabaret singer on Danny the Street. Morris Wilson's drag queen-pseudonym, "Maura Lee Karupt", is a pun on the phrase, "Morally Corrupt".
- Pisay Pao as Slava, an immortal fur-covered cavewoman with whom Niles fell in love and the mother of Dorothy.
- David A. MacDonald as Arthur "Daddy" Challis, Jane's sexually abusive father. MacDonald also voices and motion-captures the version of him in the Underground's Well area whose body is composed of puzzle pieces. Samantha Marie Ware also portrays Daddy's Miranda form.
- Joan Van Ark as the voice of Mrs. Franklin, the mother of Beard Hunter who is often heard off-screen.
- Haley Strode and Susan Williams as Dolores Mentallo, Flex's wife. Strode portrays the younger Dolores while Williams portrays the older Dolores.
- Victoria Blade as Millie, Eric Morden's ex-girlfriend.

==== Introduced in season 2 ====
- Mark Ashworth as the ringmaster, the owner of a freak show that captured Dorothy.
- John Getz as Paul Trainor, Larry's son. Fletcher Hammond portrays a younger Paul.
- Brandon Perea and Dan Martin as Jonathan Tyme / Doctor Tyme, a former scientist who gained the ability to manipulate time through contact with an alien element called Continuinium and resides in his own dimension. Perea physically portrays Doctor Tyme and Martin voices the character.
- Roger Floyd as Red Jack, an inter-dimensional being who derives his power from the pain of others.
- Michael Tourek as Kiss, the second-in-command of the SeX-Men.
- Michael Shenefelt as Cuddles, a member of the SeX-Men responsible for surveillance.
- Tracey Bonner as Torture, the leader of the SeX-Men.
- Brad Brinkley as Shadowy Mr. Evans, a sex demon.
- Irene Ziegler as Micki Harris, a community theater director and playwright.
- Mariana Klaveno as Valentina Vostok, a member of the Chief's space research team who made contact with a negative energy entity.
- Derek Evans as Zip Callahan, the pilot for the Chief's space research team.
- Jason Burkey as Specs, one of the members in the Chief's space research team.
- Jhemma Ziegler as the Scant Queen.
- Joshua Mikel as Imaginary Jesus, the imaginary friend of Cliff.
- Donna Jay Fulks as the voice of Roxy, Rita's imaginary friend, a woman made of disparate facial and body features cut out of magazines.

An uncredited baby portrayed Rory, the son of Clara. Van Clark portrayed him at age 6, Jonah Cloer portrayed him between the ages of 15 and 24 and Matthew Zuk portrayed the adult Rory.

==== Introduced in season 3 ====
- Walnette Marie Santiago as Mel, the wife of Clara.
- Stephen Murphy as Garguax the Decimator, an alien warrior employed by the Brotherhood of Evil to assassinate Rita Farr.
- Billy Boyd as Samuelson, Garguax's loyal and overzealous servant.
- Sebastian Croft as Charles Rowland, a member of the Dead Boy Detectives who died from hypothermia in a lake after being bullied.
- Ty Tennant as Edwin Paine, a member of the Dead Boy Detectives who died in 1916 after a horrific experience.
- Madalyn Horcher as Crystal Palace, a teenage girl who was once possessed by a demon, and saved by the Dead Boy Detectives. She serves as the Detectives' medium.
- Rose Bianco as Grandma Jane, the grandmother of Kay.
- Ruth Connell as Night Nurse, a demonic being that works for Death.
- Erik Passoja as the voice of Shipley, the A.I. of the time machine that Madame Rouge operated.
- Micah Joe Parker as Malcolm DuPont / Agent !, a former member of the Sisterhood of Dada with a bird cage in his chest and the power of invisibility.
- Wynn Everett as Shelley Byron / The Fog, leader of the Sisterhood of Dada with the ability to alter reality in thick fog.
- Miles Mussenden as Lloyd Jefferson / Frenzy, an artist and member of the Sisterhood of Dada with parts of a bicycle attached to his back who possesses aerokinesis.
- Anita Kalathara as Holly McKenzie / Sleepwalk, a narcoleptic member of the Sisterhood of Dada who plays Barry Manilow's music through headphones to keep awake.
- Gina Hiraizumi as Sachiko / The Quiz, a germophobic member of the Sisterhood of Dada kept in a glass case.
- David Annone as Wally Sage, a former adman who was made into a soldier by the Bureau of Normalcy due to his abilities to bring any drawing to life. He was the creator of Flex Mentallo and also created the Scissormen and the Orqwith Dimension. By season 4, Wally became part of the Cult of Immortus and brought Torminox out of the Space Case comics to aid them.
- Richard Gant as General Tony, the action figure that Vic once owned.
- Brendan Pedder as the voice of Puppet Harry, the puppet version of Kay's stuffed sheep.

==== Introduced in season 4 ====
- Joseph Avail as Codpiece, a supervillain.
- Joseph Echavarria as Stewart, a minion of Codpiece who can manifest a cannon from his butt.
- Keiko Agena as Dr. Margaret Wu, a scientist at the Bureau of Normalcy.
- Timeca Seretti as Doctor Janus, a psychic vampire.
- Dylan Saunders as the voice of Theodore "Teddy", a were-butt.
- James Smagula as the voice of Nicholas, a were-butt and the twin brother of Theodore.
- Riley Shanahan as Alistair Kincaid, a character in Rita's movie Secret Rendezvous.
- Tyler Mane as Richard Frank / Torminox, an archenemy and the father of Casey Brinke who came from the comic series Space Case.
- David Lengel as Jonathan, the host of World of Wut.
- Brooke Jaye Taylor as Clair Delaire, the Mayor of Cloverton.
- Aniya Syndelle as Joy, a student of Vic and Deric
- Jordan Makale Williams as Anthony, a student of Vic and Deric

Uncredited extras performed the Scissormen, mindless drones with scissors for hands who reside in the Orqwith Dimension.

== Episodes ==
=== Series overview ===
Season	Episodes		Originally released		
Season	Episodes		First released	Last released	Network
1	15		February 15, 2019	May 24, 2019	DC Universe
2	9		June 25, 2020	August 6, 2020	DC Universe / HBO Max
3	10		September 23, 2021	November 11, 2021	HBO Max
4	12	6	December 8, 2022	January 5, 2023	HBO Max
4	12	6	October 12, 2023	November 9, 2023	Max

=== Season 1 (2019) ===
No. overall	No. in season	Title	Directed by	Written by	Original release date
1	1	"Pilot"	Glen Winter	Jeremy Carver	February 15, 2019
In Paraguay 1948, third-rate criminal Mr. Eric Morden participates in an experiment run by former Nazi scientist Heinrich Von Fuchs that transforms him into a metahuman. In Florida 1988, NASCAR driver Clifford Steele is caught in a car crash, but is saved by Dr. Niles Caulder, who transfers Cliff's brain into a robotic body seven years later. Also living with Caulder are Rita Farr, a 1950s actress who was exposed to a toxin while filming that turned her into plastic, and former United States Air Force test pilot Larry Trainor, who was exposed to negative energy in the early 1960s. In the present, the group have lived together for many years in "Doom Manor" with Jane, a young woman with 64 super-powered personas or "alters". Jane convinces the others to go into the nearby town of Cloverton, Ohio while Caulder is away. Rita becomes upset and turns elastic, unintentionally wreaking havoc until Cliff stops her. Caulder urges them to flee with him, as their actions will attract enemies he has been hiding from. He, Jane, Rita, and Larry leave, but return to help Cliff protect Cloverton. Caulder is confronted by Morden, who opens a vortex in front of the team.
2	2	"Donkey Patrol"	Dermott Downs	Neil Reynolds & Shoshana Sachi	February 22, 2019
Morden takes Caulder into the vortex, and Jane follows, after which the vortex devours Cloverton. Realizing the futility of trying to live in the regular world, Rita retires to the Manor to wait for Caulder's return, and Larry tries to leave town, but the negative energy being inside him will not let him. Victor "Vic" Stone, a half-man, half-machine friend of Caulder's as well as Detroit's well known superhero Cyborg, sees news footage of Cloverton's destruction, and travels there to investigate. Morden's donkey spits out Jane. Back at Doom Manor, Cliff is unable to interrogate Jane about her experience because she is cycling through her alters. As Cliff learns about Jane's condition, Vic triggers one of her violent alters and she attacks him and Cliff. Rita begrudgingly agrees to go into the gateway via the donkey's mouth, and Larry and Vic are sucked in as well. On the other side, Morden tortures them with fantasies to thwart their search for Caulder, but Larry's energy being intervenes and the team, as well as the entire town of Cloverton, are spat back out. Vic's father Silas asks him to come home, but Vic refuses and decides to join the team.
3	3	"Puppet Patrol"	Rachel Talalay	Tamara Becher-Wilkinson & Tom Farrell	March 1, 2019
Vic goads the others into a road trip to Paraguay, hoping that by learning what happened there in 1948 they can find Caulder. While trying to gain some control over the negative energy being, Larry recalls his estrangement from his wife Cheryl and lover John Bowers after his accident. The team discovers that Caulder was present when Von Fuchs changed Morden into Mr. Nobody, and that Von Fuchs is still alive, only to be killed by one of Jane's alters. They return to Doom Manor on a jet provided by Silas. At Fuchtopia, a man named Steve undergoes Von Fuchs's enhancement procedure and is transformed into a metahuman.
4	4	"Cult Patrol"	Stefan Pleszczynski	Marcus Dalzine & Chris Dingess	March 8, 2019
Occult detective Willoughby Kipling comes to Doom Manor seeking Caulder's assistance to prevent the end of the world, only to find him gone, so he convinces the team to help him instead. Guided by Kipling, they abduct a tattooed, 18-year-old man named Elliott who is the key to the Cult of the Unwritten Book's attempt to summon the Decreator, an interdimensional entity who will destroy the world. Kipling sends Cliff and Jane to a priest whose stigmata are a gateway to the lost city of Nurnheim, but before Jane can sew the wounds closed, she and Cliff are drawn through the gate and captured. The high priestess of Nurnheim sends otherworldly assassins to retrieve Elliott, and Vic, Larry, Kipling, and Rita are unable to stop them. The cult begins the ritual, and a giant glowing eye appears in the sky.
5	5	"Paw Patrol"	Larry Teng	Shoshana Sachi	March 15, 2019
Mr. Nobody releases Caulder from captivity so the two can work together to stop the Decreator. Mr. Nobody travels to 1977 and uses one of Jane's alters, Dr. Harrison (whose power is persuasion), to create a Cult of the Rewritten Book, which will create a counterpart to Elliot that can oppose the Decreator. Back in the present, Cliff and present-day Jane escape Nurnheim with instructions left by Dr. Harrison. Meanwhile, Caulder, Kipling, Vic, and Larry find Elliot's counterpart, a dog, which Kipling uses to summon the Recreator, who brings back everything previously disintegrated by the Decreator. Just before Caulder leaves, Mr. Nobody freezes time and self-destructs Vic's arm cannon. In the past, Caulder rescues Jane from a mental institution in which she was being tortured and promises to keep her safe. Unbeknownst to Caulder, Mr. Nobody tells Jane to find the Doom Patrol.
6	6	"Doom Patrol Patrol"	Christopher Manley	Tamara Becher-Wilkinson	March 22, 2019
Victor's father Silas arrives to repair him. Jane's investigation leads her, Larry, and Rita to an old superhero team called the Doom Patrol; consisting of Steve Dayton / Mento, a millionaire with psychic powers whom Rita dated in 1955; Arani, a woman with elemental control of fire and ice who claims to be Caulder's wife; Rhea, a woman with electromagnetic abilities; and Joshua Clay, a man who fires kinetic energy blasts. The current team learns that Caulder assembled and led the original Doom Patrol, but they disbanded after being defeated by Mr. Nobody. Steve, Arani, and Rhea are also revealed to be old and mentally ill, with Joshua as their caretaker. A medicated Steve has projected an illusion that they are young and running a school for super-powered children. He subjects Jane, Larry, and Rita to delusions of painful events from their pasts before Rita is able to calm him down. Meanwhile, back at Doom Manor, Vic hacks into Cliff's daughter's social media account for him after Cliff discovers that she survived the crash that destroyed his body and killed his wife.
7	7	"Therapy Patrol"	Rob Hardy	Neil Reynolds	March 29, 2019
The team struggles with their personal demons. Rita struggles to figure out her true identity. Larry's energy spirit forces him to revisit his affair with John. Vic discovers that online dating is difficult for Cyborg. Jane struggles to connect with her alters. Cliff confronts his daughter's adoptive father Bump, only to realize the scenario is a hallucination. Cliff decides the team needs a group therapy session, and they reluctantly begin to share in turn: Rita is having an identity crisis, Larry is lonely and laments pushing John away after the accident, and Vic blames himself for his mother's death. Cliff and Jane hurt each other's feelings, and Cliff has a breakdown caused by Admiral Whiskers, a rat convinced by Mr. Nobody to seek revenge against the team, who caused his mother's death.
8	8	"Danny Patrol"	Dermott Downs	Tom Farrell	April 5, 2019
Cliff and Rita seek out Jane, who is under the control of Karen, a perky but unstable alter with the power to make people love her. In their search for Caulder, Larry and Vic come across a sentient, genderqueer, teleporting street named Danny, which is being hunted by the Bureau of Normalcy. Larry remembers his own experience with the Bureau, which experimented on him in the 1960s after his accident and gave him the first glimpse of his negative energy spirit. Former Bureau agent Morris Wilson has become a drag queen named Maura Lee Karupt who helps keep Danny going by sustaining a party atmosphere. She faces off with her former partner, Agent Darren Johnson, to stop the Bureau's persecution of Danny. Jane and Karen fight for control of her mind, but soon Jane snaps, leaving her catatonic while her consciousness is dragged into the Underground.
9	9	"Jane Patrol"	Harry Jierjian	Marcus Dalzine	April 12, 2019
A catatonic Jane is confronted by her many other alters in the Underground, who want her to restore order and resume being the dominant alter. With the help of Driver 8, Jane chooses to remain catatonic and try to figure out what is wrong with her. Back in Doom Manor, the team argues about how to help Jane until Larry's negative spirit sends Cliff's consciousness into the Underground. He is soon subdued by two of Jane's aggressive alters, Hammerhead and Driller Bill, and locked in a cell next to Karen. She is let go, and Penny Farthing leads Cliff through Jane's memories. Cliff and Jane face her biggest fear, revealed to be Jane's abusive father, who appears as a giant monster made of puzzle pieces. Jane's cathartic rage destroys him, and she and Cliff leave the Underground. Jane awakens in Doom Manor.
10	10	"Hair Patrol"	Salli Richardson-Whitfield	Eric Dietel	April 19, 2019
The Bureau of Normalcy tasks the Beard Hunter to locate Caulder. In 1913, Caulder and his partner Alistair are investigating a strange creature for The Bureau of Oddities. Alistair is seemingly killed by wolves. Caulder breaks his leg while fleeing and is rescued by a primitive woman named Slava. Caulder falls in love with her and discovers that she is immortal and controls the creature. Caulder stays with Slava for years, but Alistair reappears and says that the Bureau of Oddities is now the Bureau of Normalcy, with the new mission of killing any oddities they find, including Slava. Caulder kills Alistair to save Slava and returns to the Bureau claiming she does not exist. In the present, Mr. Nobody offers Caulder the chance to save the team and be released if he reveals Slava's location, but Caulder adamantly refuses. The Beard Hunter infiltrates Doom Manor and consumes some of Caulder's facial hair from the sink drain as means to track him. Vic and Rita find and interrogate him, but he is able to get free and overpower Vic. Later, the Beard Hunter tracks down an effigy of Caulder, and Slava's creature appears and attacks him.
11	11	"Frances Patrol"	Wayne Yip	April Fitzsimmons	April 26, 2019
The team faces their shortcomings. Jane laments that they are unable to save Caulder. Cliff, accompanied by Rita, arrives at Bump's memorial service to reconnect with his daughter Clara. There, Cliff realizes how important Clara's adoptive father had been to her while he was gone and decides to affirm his love by retrieving a watch, treasured by Clara, from Frances, the massive alligator that killed Bump. Larry and John revisit their love affair through a shared dreamscape, as the negative spirit pushes Larry to reconcile with an aged John in the real world. Vic worries about his cybernetics' operating system Grid, over which he seems to be losing control as the cybernetics are slowly expanding throughout his body. Following the clue previously left behind by Danny the Street, Vic and Jane pursue a man called the "Hero of the Beach" who goes by the name of Flex Mentallo. Vic is captured by the Bureau of Normalcy during the search.
12	12	"Cyborg Patrol"	Carol Banker	Robert Berens & Shoshana Sachi	May 3, 2019
Silas arrives looking for a missing Vic, who the team soon realizes has been taken by the Bureau of Normalcy. Determining that Vic is being held at the Ant Farm, Silas devises a plan to rescue him, and enlists the others to help. At the facility, Vic is tortured and Grid reboots twice, further disorienting him. Silas and the team infiltrate the Ant Farm with Jane and Larry posing as agents of the Bureau bringing in Cliff as a prisoner. Darren and his team surround and subdue the team with specialized weapons, Silas having tipped them off in exchange for access to his son. Vic is furious at what Silas has done, but Silas's "betrayal" is part of the rescue plan. Rita, who has been hiding in her elastic form inside Cliff, sets him and then Larry free. Karen emerges in Jane and uses her power to escape before Jane reemerges. They free all of the Bureau's other prisoners, creating enough chaos for them to flee. Silas and a confused Vic argue, and Vic beats his father senseless. Mr. Nobody appears, having orchestrated Grid's reboots, and taunts Vic that he has just killed his own father.
13	13	"Flex Patrol"	T.J. Scott	Tom Farrell & Tamara Becher-Wilkinson	May 10, 2019
The team returns home with Flex Mentallo, who is suffering from memory loss. Silas is alive but in critical condition. In 1964, Flex is captured by the Bureau of Normalcy. Larry has a chance to help him escape, but is too afraid of the consequences. Flex is continually tortured but resists cooperating, until the Bureau threatens to harm his wife. In the present, Cliff, Jane, and Larry try to restore Flex' memories and abilities, eventually deciding to reunite Flex and his wife. When Dolores disintegrates in front of him during their reunion, Flex unleashes his powers in his agony, causing an electrical outage over a large region. Rita deals with her guilt over the suicide of a young actress who conceived a baby with a film producer after Rita arranged their meeting and was left alone to care for it. With Rita's support, Cyborg decides to reinstall Grid, stay with his injured father, and leave the team. Larry decides to give a new chance at life to the negative spirit and releases it, but he is left slowly dying in the process. The negative spirit returns to Larry. Mr. Nobody acknowledges that the team is ready to face him.
14	14	"Penultimate Patrol"	Rebecca Rodriguez	Chris Dingess	May 17, 2019
In 1946, Morden's girlfriend Millie leaves him after he is fired from the Brotherhood of Evil, calling him a nobody. In the present, the team's search for the Beard Hunter brings them to Danny the Street. Though afraid of Mr. Nobody, Danny reveals that Caulder is being held in a dimension called "the White Space". Vic apologizes to a recovering Silas for his attack, but Silas confesses that he altered Vic's memories of his accident. Vic's mother also survived the explosion, but Silas could only save one of them, and chose Vic. Flex transports the team to the White Space, where they each find themselves reliving the day their respective tragedies occur. Mr. Nobody offers to let them live out their lives differently if they give up their search for Caulder. They refuse, and Vic shows up and atomizes the villain. A year later, the team has become the next Doom Patrol, but they are caught in a time loop in which they keep dying. Mr. Nobody reveals this to be an illusion, and that they are all still in the White Space. He coerces Caulder to reveal the secret that Caulder is responsible for the events which gave each of them their powers.
15	15	"Ezekiel Patrol"	Dermott Downs	Tamara Becher-Wilkinson & Jeremy Carver & Shoshana Sachi	May 24, 2019
Caulder recalls the events that led to the creation of each Doom Patrol member. The team goes their separate ways and attempt to integrate into society, but are summoned to Doom Manor by Danny, who has been kidnapped by Mr. Nobody. Caulder reveals that he was searching for the means to extend his own life so that he might protect his daughter. The team steps through a painting to rescue Danny and Caulder's daughter, who has enlarged Ezekiel and Admiral Whiskers. The two creatures have forced Mr. Nobody out and are on a rampage. The team executes Vic's plan: Rita convinces Mr. Nobody to continue his narration, which exerts control over Ezekiel and Whiskers, and the team allow themselves to be devoured by Ezekiel. Larry unleashes a nuclear blast, killing Whiskers, trapping Mr. Nobody and the Beard Hunter in the painting and reducing Danny from a street to a brick, but the others are protected by being inside Ezekiel. Back at Doom Manor, Vic slices open Ezekiel's abdomen and they step out, including Caulder's daughter, Dorothy Spinner. The team faces a new problem: everyone except Larry has been shrunk to a tiny size.

=== Season 2 (2020) ===
No. overall	No. in season	Title	Directed by	Written by	Original release date
16	1	"Fun Size Patrol"	Christopher Manley	Jeremy Carver & Shoshana Sachi	June 25, 2020
In 1927, a caged Dorothy is kept locked up in a circus as the "ape faced girl", who has to entertain the crowd with her summoned creature. When the ringleader attempts to punish her creature, the voice of the Candlemaker calls out to her, telling her to make a wish. As she blows out a candle, everyone in the circus is killed, with the exception of Niles Caulder. In the present, Larry tries in vain to restore Dorothy, Caulder, Rita, Cliff, Jane, Vic and Danny to their normal size. While the rest of the team deals with personal problems, Rita learns to use her powers. Rita suggests Caulder to call Willoughby Kipling for help; though initially against the idea, Caulder eventually gives in. Kipling agrees to help in exchange for Caulder's most valuable possession: a talisman that grants immortality. The group is returned to their normal size, minus Danny who remains the form of a brick. Afterwards, Vic leaves Doom Manor. Dorothy overhears Caulder talking to Kipling about his condition. Later, the Candlemaker calls out to her once more, telling her to make a wish to save her father, but she refuses to comply.
17	2	"Tyme Patrol"	Harry Jierjian	April Fitzsimmons & Neil Reynolds	June 25, 2020
Caulder reveals to the group of his deal with Kipling and works on finding new ways to prolong his life in order to protect Dorothy. Rita learns that Caulder wants to use Continuinium, an alien element that controls time, currently in possession of Dr. Jonathan Tyme, a scientist imbued with the power to manipulate time. Rita, Cliff and Jane travel to Tyme's dimension with Caulder's help, but fail to recover the element. In Detroit, Vic attends a PTSD therapy group meeting and meets Roni Evers, a military veteran who he bonds with over the loss of their mothers. Larry goes to attend his son Gary's funeral, and reveals himself to his other son, Paul. Larry later visits Gary's home, where he finds several mementos of him kept by Gary in a shed. As he takes a walk back home, he is captured by a flock of butterflies.
18	3	"Pain Patrol"	Samira Radsi	Tom Farrell & Tamara Becher-Wilkinson	June 25, 2020
In 1888, a young Caulder encounters Red Jack, an interdimensional being who feeds on pain under the guise of Jack the Ripper. In the present, Red Jack delivers a letter to Caulder, along with a piece of Larry's bandage, demanding his appearance. Caulder and Rita agree to go together to save Larry. Red Jack attempts to convince Caulder to be his apprentice in exchange for immortality, but upon refusal, decides to unleash pain on him, as well as Rita and Larry. Caulder kills Red Jack and escapes with the others. While home alone, Dorothy accidentally breaks Danny in half while playing with her imaginary friends. Later, while attempting to fix Danny, Caulder begins drawing up a blueprint for "Robotman 2.0". Cliff and Jane visit Clara. Cliff attempts to tell Clara the truth, but ends up causing her to call the police. While sleeping on the bus, Jane's alters confront her, demanding that she either leave the Manor, or lose her status as the primary alter. On the way back, she ends up being locked up as the other alters prepare to take over. After having sex, Vic asks Roni out on a date, but the latter does not show up. She sends him an email, detailing her previous criminal records.
19	4	"Sex Patrol"	Omar Madha	Eric Dietel & Tanya Steele	July 2, 2020
The Dannyzens try throwing a party to revive Danny and succeed in doing so. Vic returns to the Manor and receives advice from Karupt about his relationship with Roni. Rita consults Flex on how to control her power; she resorts to having Flex give her an orgasm, which attracts a sex demon, The Shadowy Mr. Evans. The SeX-Men, a paranormal unit of the Pentagon, crashes the party looking for Mr. Evans. Hammerhead, after taking over Jane, learns from one of the SeX-Men that Mr. Evans intends to give birth to a baby, whose cries would result in the death of all children. In trying to save Kay, Hammerhead prevents the birth of the baby, and sends Evans back to his dimension. The Candlemaker convinces Dorothy to stay up after bedtime and join the party. Upon learning that Caulder wanted Danny to keep her locked up, Dorothy intends to break Danny's brick form, but stops when she realizes Danny shares her sentiment. Jane's other personas eventually concede and allow her to take over as primary again. Danny is given a new form, a tire, and teleports away with the rest of the Dannyzens.
20	5	"Finger Patrol"	Glen Winter	Chris Dingess & Shoshana Sachi	July 9, 2020
Dorothy and Jane's identity Baby Doll become friends until Baby Doll summons Flaming Katy, who kills Dorothy's imaginary friend Manny. Larry and Rita go to visit Paul and meet the rest of his family. Cliff discovers the human upgrades that Caulder plans for him. Vic heads back to Detroit with Cliff and both ask Silas for a better design for Cliff, but he refuses the job. After receiving advice from Cliff, Vic apologizes to Roni and makes up with her. He later learns that she was formerly enhanced with cybernetics for black ops missions. Later, while alone with Larry, Paul betrays him and members of the Bureau of Normalcy arrive to arrest Larry. He releases the negative spirit, who defeats them, but Larry's grandson Dex is shot in the crossfire. After Baby Doll and Katy kill Manny, Dorothy allows the Candlemaker to infiltrate the Underground and kill them.
21	6	"Space Patrol"	Kristin Windell	Neil Reynolds	July 16, 2020
Caulder's old research team, a group of ageless astronauts called The Pioneers of the Uncharted, visits Doom Manor. Feeling guilty over Baby Doll's death, Dorothy steps in the Pioneers' spaceship and heads to space. Cliff finds Jane unconscious and covered in wax, and Caulder deduces that Dorothy is responsible. The two pursue Dorothy in a second spaceship. After finding Dorothy, Cliff convinces her to return. Rita lands a role in a theater production, but then learns that it is based on a past event where she went berserk and attacked the town in her blob form. Meanwhile, one of the Pioneers, Valentina "Moscow" Vostok, also possesses a Negative Spirit, and her two companions have long died, while their corpses are possessed. After helping Moscow bury her friends, Larry decides to commit to amending with his family. Vic learns that Roni's old enhancements are slowly poisoning her. Trying to find a cure, he discovers that the tech was distributed by S.T.A.R. Labs and Caulder Robotics. In the Underground, Jane attends a funeral for Baby Doll and Katy, after which Miranda returns and takes over as Primary. While returning to Earth, Caulder opens the airlock door, blowing Cliff into space.
22	7	"Dumb Patrol"	Jessica Lowrey	Tamara Becher-Wilkinson & Eric Dietel	July 23, 2020
Cliff crashes on the side of the road and starts walking back home. Caulder travels to the Northern Yukon Territory to search for Dorothy's mother, Slava. While there, he has a nightmarish encounter with the Candlemaker who tells him that Dorothy belongs with him. Vic takes Roni to Doom Manor, where she meets Larry, Rita and Miranda. In preparation for her role in a local theater production, Rita visits the Cloverton beekeeper, who later gives her advice on dealing with her childhood trauma. A mysterious package is delivered at the Manor containing the White Space painting. The painting infects Larry, Vic and Roni with Scants, small creatures who provoke their minds to do bad ideas. After Kipling appears to explain the situation, all five are sucked into the White Space, where they get captured by the Scants. The Scants take them to their Queen, but Miranda defeats her. Roni secretly takes a sample of the queen's "Uma Jelly". Cliff makes it back to the Manor and sees a pregnant Clara there waiting for him. In the Underground, Jane finds out that Scarlet Harlot's station is closed. Kipling later meets Caulder in Yukon to discuss Dorothy.
23	8	"Dad Patrol"	Amanda Row	Tom Farrell & April Fitzsimmons	July 30, 2020
Caulder takes Dorothy out of town to a fair. Kipling gets a warning about a cataclysmic event from Bunberry and contacts Caulder. While Caulder is feeling sick Dorothy has fun until she has a vision, in which she runs away from the Candlemaker in Yukon. Cliff makes breakfast for his daughter Clara and the two bond. Jane and Larry go to Arkansas to retrieve a stuffed animal that belonged to Kay, in order for Jane to prove she is capable as primary for Kay. Jane learns that Miranda kept Kay's animal in a safe spot years ago, then apologizes to her in the Underground. Miranda, however, then pushes Jane into the Well, where she finds the bodies of the missing alters. Vic learns from local news and FBI agents that Roni committed a murder as revenge for her past experiment. He later confronts her, and learns she used the Uma Jelly to enhance herself. The two briefly fight, but Vic is unable to take Roni in. Kipling arrives at the fair and tells Caulder that Dorothy needs to be taken away, but the Candlemaker's powers begins to manifest in the real world.
24	9	"Wax Patrol"	Christopher Manley	Chris Dingess & Tanya Steele	August 6, 2020
In 1969, Miranda as the Primary meets a young man named John who she falls in love with. During their housewarming party, she discovers that John intended to throw an orgy, betraying her trust. Miranda loses her Primary status, and as a result decides to jump into the Well, while Jane takes over and leaves John. In the present day, Herschel, Dorothy's giant spider imaginary friend, appears at Doom Manor and summons the team to help fight the Candlemaker. Rita, Vic and Cliff face off against their own imaginary friends formed by the Candlemaker. The entire team minus Miranda is defeated and is covered by the Candlemaker's wax. Miranda is summoned to the Underground by the other alters who question the disappearance of Jane. While Jane discovers Miranda's corpse in the Well, Kay deduces at the same time that the current Miranda is actually Daddy from the Well. Slava appears and convinces Dorothy to confront the Candlemaker alone, despite Caulder's objection.

=== Season 3 (2021) ===
No. overall	No. in season	Title	Directed by	Written by	Original release date
25	1	"Possibilities Patrol"	Dermott Downs	Tamara Becher-Wilkinson & Eric Dietel & Shoshana Sachi	September 23, 2021
After Dorothy convinces the Candlemaker that they can be friends instead of enemies, the Doom Patrol is un-waxed and Caulder dies of old age. A week later, Rita quits her play; Larry confronts the Negative Spirit, who convinces him to finally let go; Vic tracks down Roni planning to blow up a building and reports her to the FBI, while Cliff is confronted by Caulder's spirit, who unsuccessfully attempts to get Cliff to incinerate Caulder's body so that his spirit can move on, and convinces Cliff to go see his daughter. In the Underground, Jane learns that Miranda is actually the manifestation of all negative emotions that the alters have amassed over the years and attempts to fully take over Jane's physical body. Aided by Kay and other alters, Jane uses a plane to escape the Underground and wrest control over her body. Larry leaves the Doom Patrol and heads to space. A week later, Rita is alerted to an incoming arrival, which turns out to be a mysterious woman in a time machine, who is looking for Caulder. At the Northern Yukon, Kipling takes Caulder's severed head and remarks that his time is not over yet.
26	2	"Vacay Patrol"	Christopher Manley	Tom Farrell	September 23, 2021
In 1949, the Brotherhood of Evil assigns Garguax to go undercover in Codsville Mountain Resort and wait for a signal to assassinate Rita Farr. Garguax and his servant Samuelson continue to wait for decades as the signal never arrives, even after learning of the Brotherhood's disbandment. In the present day, the Doom Patrol agree to go to Codsville Resort on vacation to take their minds off of Caulder's death and other personal drama. While at the resort, Garguax overhears the Doom Patrol and learns of Caulder's fate and Rita's state of mind. Realizing his mission no longer has purpose, he intends to leave the resort, much to Samuelson's dismay. As they prepare to leave, they finally receive a signal from the Brotherhood, prompting Samuelson to turn on Garguax and kill him, then the Doom Patrol. Rita attempts to escape, but is stopped by a time-traveled version of herself. Meanwhile, Larry returns to the Manor, with the Negative Spirit no longer inhabiting his body.
27	3	"Dead Patrol"	Christopher Manley	Jeremy Carver & Steve Yockey	September 23, 2021
The Doom Patrol's corpses are shipped back to the Manor, shocking both Larry and Dorothy. Through Danny, the two make contact with the Dead Boy Detectives agency, a teenage detective trio specializing in supernatural phenomena. They learn that the Doom Patrol's souls are trapped in the underworld, prompting Larry to go rescue them. The two detectives, Charles Rowland and Edwin Paine, accompany Larry to the underworld, while Dorothy stays behind with the medium Crystal Palace. In the underworld, each of the Doom Patrol member encounters a family member in their afterlife: Cliff meets his father, Vic meets his mother, while Jane and Kay meet their grandmother. Eventually, Larry and the boys locate the gang and help them escape Death's servant, the Night Nurse. Rita is assisted by a masked man who she does not recognize, as the man sacrifices himself to the Night Nurse. Afterwards, Dorothy decides to join the Dead Boy Detectives on a journey. The Doom Patrol then finds the time-traveling woman casually inhabiting the Manor.
28	4	"Undead Patrol"	Kristin Windell	Tamara Becher-Wilkinson	September 30, 2021
The time-traveling woman explains to the Doom Patrol that she is looking for Caulder, though she has suffered amnesia from her journey. After searching the Manor, she finds a film reel which reveals her identity as Laura De Mille, and that she has shapeshifting powers. Meanwhile, the gang slowly turns into zombies, due to having been attacked by the Night Nurse. Kipling arrives at the Manor and reluctantly recruits Laura and the zombified Doom Patrol to help him recover Caulder's head from Darren Jones. Jones transforms into a Were-butt and summons a horde to fight the gang, but ultimately loses. Afterwards, Caulder's head volunteers to sacrifice his brain to the Doom Patrol, which would cure their affliction. Laura learns that Caulder's head requested for the Bureau of Normalcy to eliminate her, leaving her depressed, but she discovers Rita appearing in the film reel. After the gang cures themselves, they return to dealing with their personal problems: Larry finds a tumor growing in his stomach alongside signs of sickness; Vic becomes conflicted after learning from Silas about an alternative surgery using synthetic skin that could've saved his life; Jane continues to mourn Caulder's death; Cliff attempts to order medication for his brain condition; and Rita becomes concerned when she suspects Laura's involvement at Codsville. Meanwhile, a surviving Were-butt, now zombified, heads toward Cloverton.
29	5	"Dada Patrol"	Kristin Windell	Shoshana Sachi	October 7, 2021
Laura assigns the Doom Patrol to find the Sisterhood of Dada, a group of metahumans who escaped the Ant Farm, believing that her time-traveling purpose is to kill them. Cliff, Larry, Vic, and Jane head out to find the Sisterhood while Rita and Laura stay at the Manor, where they discuss Rita's appearance in the film reel. The team encounters members of the Sisterhood who attempt to psychologically manipulate them, while Larry discovers Paul, who can only utter random words. The team returns to the Manor, refusing to help Laura further with pursuing the Sisterhood. Jane argues with Dr. Harrison when Kay is in need of new shoes due to her outgrowing the ones that she's been wearing. In an attempt to prove Laura wrong, Rita fixes her time machine and attempts to use it. Meanwhile, Larry's tumor mutates further, being able to move freely within his body and glowing blue.
30	6	"1917 Patrol"	Omar Madha	April Fitzsimmons	October 14, 2021
Rita arrives in 1917, where she becomes amnesiac and is captured by the Bureau of Normalcy. After being given a new name Bendy, she quickly befriends the metahuman workers there, who secretly form the Sisterhood of Dada, alongside a young Laura who is also a member. She forms a romantic bond with one of their members, Malcolm. In the present day, Cliff becomes addicted to video games and online gambling, leading to him selling the others' personal belongings and eventually agreeing to sell his own blueprint design. After a self-discovery journey, Vic decides to undergo a surgery for synthetic skin. Larry nurses Paul back to health, then argues with him about his status as a Bureau member and Larry's responsibility as a father. Afterwards, his tumor begins to cause him great pain. Jane decides to let Kay take over and visit the real world to obtain some new shoes, much to the other personas' dismay. Laura continues to research about the Sisterhood until they reach out to her.
31	7	"Bird Patrol"	Omar Madha	Ezra Claytan Daniels	October 21, 2021
In 1949, Laura attempts to betray the Sisterhood of Dada to the Bureau of Normalcy as meta weapons. In the ensuing struggle, Malcolm is killed by a Bureau member, leaving Rita distraught. In the present day, Larry's tumor grows into a blue larva, which he is unwilling to get rid of; Cliff continues to struggle with his gambling addiction; Jane is unable to talk to Kay after the other personas conspire to grief her despite leaving a new pair of shoes for her; and Vic decides to go through with the surgery after contacting Roni. The gang and Laura are then summoned by Rita and the Sisterhood to witness the birth of a bird-like creature, created in Malcolm's image. When Rita releases the creature from its cage, it splits into multiple smaller versions and teleports each Doom Patrol member away, while Laura, having recovered her memory, escapes amidst the chaos.
32	8	"Subconscious Patrol"	Rebecca Rodriguez	Tanya Steele	October 28, 2021
In 1949, Laura accepts an offer to join the Brotherhood of Evil under a new name, Madame Rouge, and is tasked to time-travel to 2021 to recover Caulder's technology. Rita plans to foil Laura and the Brotherhood's schemes by returning to the present first, recovering her old memories in the process. She time-travels to Codsville and stops her 2021 self from escaping the resort, ensuring that she would die and meet Malcolm in the underworld. In the present day, the Sisterhood's creation has enacted the Eternal Flagellation, which causes people all over the world to switch places with their subconscious selves. Rita gathers the subconscious selves of the Doom Patrol: Vic's childhood toy General Tony, Kay in adult form, and Cliff and Larry's former human selves. The Doom Patrol later manage to escape their subconscious and confront their other selves. They then are returned to their lives, as Cliff is confronted by Clara over his addiction; Larry attempts to bring the larva home; Jane discovers all the other personas have disappeared, leaving her and Kay in the Underground; and Vic completes his synthetic skin surgery, completely removing his Cyborg enhancements. Meanwhile, Laura confronts Rita.
33	9	"Evil Patrol"	Rebecca Rodriguez	Eric Dietel	November 4, 2021
Laura escapes Rita and locates the Brotherhood of Evil, now living in a retirement home in Florida. The Brain assigns her with another mission to earn membership. Rita attempts to convince the Doom Patrol to pursue the Brotherhood, but fails due to Vic having given up his powers, Kay/Jane having seemingly lost the other personas, Larry trying to take care of the larva, and Cliff trying to mend his relationship with Clara. Laura infiltrates the Doom Manor and manages to incapacitate Cliff, delivering him back to the Brotherhood so the Brain can steal his body, but the Brain betrays Laura and orders Monsieur Mallah to dump her in the woods. Rita gathers the Doom Patrol to rescue Cliff, but then argues over her personal vendetta with Laura. Meanwhile in the Underground, Kay discovers a dark area where seemingly evil spirits inhabit. As she runs back to her room in horror, she lets out a scream, which causes Jane to scream in the real world, triggering Larry's larva and causing their bus to crash.
34	10	"Amends Patrol"	Harry Jierjian	Chris Dingess	November 11, 2021
The Doom Patrol encounters Sisterhood member Shelley, who takes them into the Fog while Rita pursues the Brotherhood alone. In the Fog, Larry learns that the larva, named Keeg, wants to merge with him in order to stay alive. Vic helps contain Keeg's spirit until he and Larry returns to the Doom Manor, allowing Larry and Keeg to merge. Laura is left alive by Mallah who decides to part ways with the Brain, allowing her to use the discarded giant robot from the dumping grounds, with Cliff's brain operating it. The Brain is severely wounded by Laura and Cliff's rampage and is later killed when Rita finds him and pours boiling water directly on him. Jane learns that all of the other personae have taken refuge in the Fog, but in doing so, they are slowly dying due to being separated from the Underground. She makes a deal with Dr. Harrison to seemingly hand over her status as primary, forcing the others to return. Cliff makes amends with Clara and promises to be better, before returning to the mansion, where his Parkinson's causes him to lose control of his new robot body and begin rampaging. After deciding to let a remorseful Laura live, Rita manages to stop Cliff by growing to a giant size. Afterwards, Rita rallies the team into pursuing heroic activities as a super group, and reluctantly accepts Laura's request to join them. They then use the time machine to travel to the Suez Canal, where a testicle-like monster is wreaking havoc, under the team name "Doom Force", which everyone except Cliff dislikes.

=== Season 4 (2022–23) ===
No. overall	No. in season	Title	Directed by	Written by	Original release date
Part 1
35	1	"Doom Patrol"	Christopher Manley	Tamara Becher-Wilkinson	December 8, 2022
Sometime after the conflict with the Brotherhood of Evil, Vic and Silas help fully restore Cliff's robot body while also giving him the sense of touch. Cliff convinces the team to use the time machine to go to Florida and visit his grandson, but a mishap in the time stream causes them to travel to the year 2042. They meet up with an older Vic, who explains that Cloverton was decimated by zombified Were-butts in 2022, leaving him as the sole survivor while the other members of the Doom Patrol remain as spirits in the Manor, minus Laura who disappeared prior to the outbreak. Dr. Harrison learns from her future self that her eventual actions would result in Kay's death, while Larry interacts with a grown-up Keeg, who speaks with the young Keeg and causes the spirit to become angry. The team learns afterwards that the spirits stalled them so future Vic could use the time machine to go back and undo their mistake. A horde of Were-butts attacks them, allowing the team to escape while future Vic leaves behind a message for his younger self before being devoured. Back in the present, Jane is given control as the primary persona once more as Kay tells her to not look for her, while Keeg refuses to speak to Larry. Elsewhere, Kipling meets with the Knights Templar, and receives a prophecy from the rabbit Bunbury of Immortus' imminent arrival.
36	2	"Butt Patrol"	Christopher Manley	Eric Dietel	December 8, 2022
Rita attempts to put together a plan to prevent the dark future from happening, but the team proposes new leadership under Laura, who reluctantly agrees much to Rita's dismay. Afterwards, Laura and Cliff head off on their own to track down Darren Jones, who they suspect is the source of the zombie infection, while Jane and Vic pretend to be Bureau of Normalcy agents and contact the Butt Hunter, who has acquired the last living zombie Were-butt. At the Manor, Keeg continues to ignore Larry's pleas to speak with him, while Rita confronts Larry on betraying her and voting for Laura's leadership. Larry vents on Rita's inability to lead the team, and his desires to maintain a good relationship with Keeg based on what he saw in the future. Cliff and Laura manage to find Darren, now zombified and working as a farmer to suppress his desires for human brains. Darren asks for Cliff to mercy kill him, which he reluctantly does after Laura removes his helmet and exposes his head to goad Darren into attacking. The team reunites at the Manor with Vic and Jane having successfully recovered the last frozen zombie Were-butt. Cliff is tasked to kill it. Unbeknownst to them, one Were-butt named Nicholas is still living in the outside world with former Ant Farm employee Dr. Margaret Yu.
37	3	"Nostalgia Patrol"	Kristin Windell	Tanya Steele	December 15, 2022
Vic reunites with his old classmates, including his best friend, Deric. While hanging out, Deric confronts Vic on distancing himself from the others after his accident. The two eventually make up, and Deric gives Vic his old robot for safekeeping. Rita receives an invite to a screening of her classic films, but when she arrives, she is trapped within the films. The Doom Patrol decide to help Laura make amends with Rita by going to her movie screening, but they also end up being absorbed into the films, minus Laura who manages to escape. The gang eventually learns from an individual named Oliver Truman within the films of Secret Rondezvous, The Haunting of White Manor that a person named Dr. Janus is looking to acquire Rita's emotions. Laura returns to the mansion and looks up Dr. Janus's files, but finds no way to defeat her, and wallows in self-pity. The gang manages to find Rita, but is trapped by Truman, who is revealed to be Janus's accomplice Mister 104 as they end up on the set of Spartacus 452. Janus implores Rita to save her friends, allowing her to drain the last emotions needed for Immortus's arrival. The gang is saved by Keeg, but Rita remains unconscious as they are teleported out of the illusion.
38	4	"Casey Patrol"	Kristin Windell	Tom Farrell	December 22, 2022
Sometime after parting ways with the Doom Patrol, Dorothy has managed to reacquire Caulder's necklace, which used to keep him immortal, in order to conjure his spirit and reunite with him. While staying with Danny the Street and their residents, she distances herself from the rest of the community. One night, a swarm of cybernetic bugs invades the street, converting the residents into robots, minus Dorothy and Maura Lee. Dorothy realizes the robots are the same ones from her favorite comic book series Space Case and manages to materialize the heroine Space Case (AKA Casey Brinke). Dorothy and Casey explain to Maura Lee that the attack is orchestrated by Torminox, Casey's father and nemesis. The trio confronts Torminox in real life, but Casey hesitates to take him down, while he manages to capture Danny and defeat the Candlemaker easily. Later, Casey attempts to plead with Torminox, but he ignores her while demanding Dorothy's necklace. She hands it over, while revealing that she had never reunited with Caulder, and she was trying to distance herself from Danny and the others to not be reminded of him. After Torminox retreats with the necklace, Maura Lee gathers the community and implores them to embrace the real world when they are ready. Casey and Dorothy decide to go to Cloverton to find the author of the Space Case comic book. Unbeknownst to them, the author is working with Janus and Torminox and preparing for Immortus' arrival as the author tells Torminox that Immortus might help them live out their dreams.
39	5	"Youth Patrol"	Christopher Manley	Shoshana Sachi	December 29, 2022
Larry attempts to track down Keeg, and encounters Mister 104, who has been forced to host Keeg in his body. Through Keeg, Larry learns that Mister 104 was once a man named Rama, who was constantly being experimented on by the Bureau. As a result, Rama has joined forces with Janus and pledged to Immortus, hoping to reverse his condition before it goes out of control and causes a mass extinction event. Larry pleads with Rama to find an alternative solution; just as Keeg returns to Larry's body, a dimensional portal sucks him in, and Rama follows in pursuit. At the Manor, Kipling reveals to the Doom Patrol about Immortus, who is an ancient deity capable of eliminating reality. He also reveals that Caulder once spoke of having a piece of Immortus, which he used as a catalyst for his necklace, as well as his experiments on Larry, Rita, Cliff and Jane to retain their longevity. Rita wakes up and finds that she is aging, prompting her to look in Caulder's office for a remedy. She breaks a vial containing a de-aging spell, which also affects the Doom Patrol and Kipling. The team set out to find Kipling's mentor to reverse the spell, but the team, driven by their youthful demeanor, decide to attend a pool party. Rita and Laura break off on their own and finally make amends after a tearful conversation. After talking to Jane about friendship, Vic decides to go see Deric, though he turns into a child by the time he gets there. As the de-aging spell accelerates, Bunbury and the Knights Templar arrive at the party and turn Kipling back to normal while Bunbury proceeds to extract Jane's longevity after she turns into a baby.
40	6	"Hope Patrol"	Christopher Manley	Ezra Claytan Daniels	January 5, 2023
After the de-aging spell is reversed, Cliff advises Jane to make the most of her remaining life instead of pursuing Immortus. She visits Shelley and attempts to confess her feelings, but is conflicted between her desire to live for herself and her self-imposed duty to protect Kay. Larry is taken to the pocket dimension Orqwith by the Scissormen, mindless drones with scissors for hands. Rama saves him and takes him back to the Manor via a portal, before Keeg intervenes and takes both of them back. Rita and Laura infiltrate the Ant Farm to learn more about the Immortus Project, but find its records missing, having been borrowed by an inmate named Wally Sage, a metahuman who was labelled a weapon by Laura in the past, and also Malcolm's killer. They visit Wally's cell, but upon seeing Wally, Rita panics and transforms into a blob, seemingly killing Wally. Vic and Deric return to the Manor and pursue Larry through the portal, while Cliff convinces Jane to continue their fight against Immortus. An injured Kipling arrives, informing the two of them that Bunbury was killed by Immortus' agents who took Jane's longevity, but they ignore his warning. Keeg reveals to Larry his vision of the future, where he was forced to kill the latter to protect the universe; believing that Immortus can allow the two of them to stay together, Larry allows his longevity to be extracted. Meanwhile, Vic, Derec, Cliff and Jane are captured by the Scissormen while they are greeted by Wally and two other Immortus agents. Cliff realizes that he didn't close the freezer all the way causing the Were-butt to thaw and get loose.
Part 2
41	7	"Orqwith Patrol"	Bosede Williams	Tamara Becher-Wilkinson & Bob Barth	October 12, 2023
Rita and Laura escape the Ant Farm with Wally's drawings, though the former becomes depressed, believing that she had committed murder. Laura later convinces her to help her build a gateway to Orqwith to help the others. In Orqwith, the group manages to escape captivity. Vic and Deric split from the group to find Larry, while Jane and Cliff go to find Wally. They encounter Wally, who shows Cliff a vision of a potential future where he can be happy with Clara and Rory, prompting Cliff to cave and willfully surrender his longevity. As Sage, Torminox, and Doctor Janus finish their ritual, Rita and Laura reunite with the group, and they are also joined by Dorothy and Casey. As the ritual finishes, Rita is shocked to find that they have summoned Isabel Feathers, her theater rival who was pushed into a time hole by Laura when she initially arrived in the present day. With Immortus possessing her, Isabel kills Sage, Torminox, and Doctor Janus and unleashes a scream that destroys the Scissormen and the Orqwith dimension.
42	8	"Fame Patrol"	Bosede Williams	Eric Dietel	October 12, 2023
The gang wakes up and finds themselves in the real world and follows a confused Isabel, who is discovered by a local driving by. Isabel later gets on TV and talks about her return to the audiences of Cloverton. Believing Immortus to have been a lie, the group returns to dealing with their personal problems while also accepting their mortality. Larry is contacted by a disembodied Rama and helps him reassemble himself with Keeg's power. Cliff panics as he attempts to find the zombie Butt he didn't kill while also struggling with his Parkinson's condition as Dorothy attempts to help him. Casey tries to befriend Jane, who is lost in her own mind and unable to reach the Underground, and offer counsel only to be rejected. The group later decides to attend a parade celebrating Isabel's return. Upon arrival, the townsfolk hails them as heroes, much to Isabel's chagrin. Meanwhile, Laura notices that Isabel has been rewinding time to manipulate reality in her favor and only she is able to notice. When Isabel finds out from Mayor Clair Delaire that the parade is intended to celebrate the Doom Patrol finding Isabel, she snaps and unleashes another scream.
43	9	"Immortimas Patrol"	Omar Madha	Aliza Berger & Talia Berger	October 19, 2023
Isabel puts the Doom Patrol, Dorothy, Casey, and Rama in an illusion of a perfect world where they live out a holiday in honor of her, named "Immortimas Day", and constantly break into musical numbers with help from corporeal versions of the Sex Ghosts. During a number, Laura's old memory is triggered, breaking her out of Isabel's spell. She helps the others regain their memories, though some of them remain uncertain as they wish to remain in Isabel's perfect world. Later, Isabel visits the Doom Manor and attends the Doom Patrol's dinner, but the group renounces her illusion, leaving her distraught. Isabel returns the group to their normal state while taunting that they are "doomed".
44	10	"Tomb Patrol"	Omar Madha	Akaylah Ellison & Tom Farrell	October 26, 2023
After seemingly killing the last were-butt, the Butt Hunter encounters a were-butt named Teddy, who tasks him with a mission. Vic meets with Silas at S.T.A.R. Labs and asks to be upgraded into Cyborg again. Isabel invites the Doom Patrol to her one-person play in Cloverton. Laura learns that Isabel's source of power, the group's longevity, resides in a skin tag behind her neck. She proposes to the others that they should attend Isabel's play to attempt to recover their longevity, but they refuse out of fear, and wish to spend their remaining lifespan in peace. Meanwhile, Dr. Yu returns home and informs the were-butt Nicholas of Teddy's plan to start a war with humankind, while also revealing that she had been turned into a were-butt. Laura attends Isabel's play alone, where the latter is ridiculed by the audience, causing her to snap and make them disappear. Laura talks to Isabel and convinces her that not everyone will love her the way she wants. Isabel, however, believes that she should pursue the path of villainy and gain love through fear. While reminiscing their past adventures, Rita realizes that Laura has gone off on her own and tells the team to help her. She then collapses and falls unconscious, leaving Larry, Jane and Cliff to go to town and help Laura. As they arrive at the theater, they are surrounded by Teddy and the were-butt horde, but an upgraded Vic returns to assist them. The team runs inside the theater, where Isabel sends them and Laura through a time portal.
45	11	"Portal Patrol"	Christopher Manley	Chris Dingess	November 2, 2023
In the time stream, Keeg manages to detect three time portals leading to different longevity skin tags. The team splits up and enters each portal while Vic stays behind to re-summon them when needed. Laura enters the Ant Farm in 1949, where she attempts to steal Caulder's necklace, but encounters her younger self. After getting caught, Laura attempts to convince 1949-Laura to give up her work at the Bureau, but fails. Laura beats up her younger self relentlessly until Vic recalls her. Jane and Larry enter the Doom Manor in 1996, where the former encounters Caulder and receives counsel from him. After revealing that the other personas are gone, Jane is convinced by Caulder to admit the truth: that she and the other personas were born after Kay was raped by her father. Upon acknowledging her trauma, Jane is reunited with the other personas as they all ride Driver 8's train out of the Underground and to the location that Kay was building as they see kaleidoscope images outside the windows of Driver 8's train. Larry encounters the Negative Spirit, who controls 1996-Larry's body to talk to him and Keeg. The Spirit assures Larry that he and Keeg would be fine in the future, before he is recalled. Cliff visits Paraguay in 1948, and finds Caulder and Kipling in a bar. They briefly fight Nazi soldiers sent to kill Caulder, but Cliff accidentally breaks Caulder's spine on the counter, causing his legs to be paralyzed. Ridden with guilt as well as Kipling stating that Caulder will die if the necklace is taken, Cliff decides to not take his necklace. In the time stream, Vic sends a distress signal, which reaches Deric in the future, who helps him locate a time portal to return to the present day with help from his students and a future Vic. After the group reunites, Jane, in a combined persona called Kaleidoscope, does a pep talk as they collectively agree to return to fight Isabel and the were-butt horde.
46	12	"Done Patrol"	Christopher Manley	Shoshana Sachi & Ezra Claytan Daniels	November 9, 2023
The Doom Patrol prepares for their last stand against Isabel and the Were-butt horde, but Dr. Yu and Nicholas arrive and start to sing, prompting the Were-butts to sing along. Annoyed by the Butts, Isabel starts singing, causing the time portal to become unstable and engulf the entire theater. The Doom Patrol returns to their home to celebrate, but Isabel returns an hour later, having spent a thousand years in the time stream where the were-butts were helpful in her tour throughout time. She offers the team toenails, which grant them longevity. Rita dies from old age and her ghost requests the team to disband and cremate her body. Afterwards, each member goes their separate ways: Cliff returns to Florida to reunite with Clara and Rory; Larry and Keeg find Rama and take him to space, where they spend their last moments together before Rama's energy explodes; Jane goes to space with Casey and affirms her feelings; and Laura returns to the Ant Farm and murders every employee with a flamethrower. In the afterlife, Rita reunites with Malcolm. At Clara's home while helping Clara with the car, Cliff sees a vision of Rory's future in the gift Immortus gave him, where Rory goes through similar experiences as Cliff did. Feeling satisfied, Cliff's body finally shuts down and succumbs to his medical condition in peace.

== Production ==
=== Development ===
Doom Patrol was announced in May 2018, as an intended spin-off of Titans for video on demand service DC Universe after co-creator and executive producer Geoff Johns revealed that Titans' fourth episode would feature and be titled after the Doom Patrol. Despite the initial order and sharing characters and actors, however, Doom Patrol occupies a separate continuity from Titans.

Fifteen episodes were developed for the first season, which premiered on February 15, 2019, and concluded on May 24. Jeremy Carver wrote the pilot, and served as an executive producer alongside Johns, Greg Berlanti, and Sarah Schechter. Production companies involved with the series include Berlanti Productions and Warner Bros. Television. The series is influenced by writer Grant Morrison's run of the comic.

The second season premiered on both DC Universe and WarnerMedia's video on demand service HBO Max on June 25, 2020. The season was originally intended to have 10 episodes, but due to the COVID-19 pandemic, production was shut down before the 10th episode could be completed and the season instead comprised nine episodes. The third and a fourth season were later released on HBO Max, with the fourth being the final season.

=== Casting ===
The casting for Doom Patrol's first season was rounded up between July and October 2018. April Bowlby, Brendan Fraser, and Matt Bomer were cast as Rita Farr, the voice of Cliff Steele, and the voice of Larry Trainor, respectively, after being cast as the characters for guest appearances in Titans. Diane Guerrero was cast as Jane. Joivan Wade was cast as Victor "Vic" Stone / Cyborg, Alan Tudyk was cast as Eric Morden / Mr. Nobody, and Riley Shanahan was cast to physically portray the cyborg version of Cliff. Timothy Dalton was cast as Niles Caulder / Chief and Matthew Zuk was cast to physically portray the bandage-covered Larry. In March 2019, Mark Sheppard was cast as Willoughby Kipling.

In January 2020, Roger Floyd was cast as Red Jack, a malevolent entity, in the series' second season. Other second-season castings that February included Abi Monterey as the Chief's superpowered daughter, Dorothy Spinner, and Karen Obilom as Roni Evers, a military veteran with a mysterious past who Vic meets while attending a PTSD support group. Samantha Marie Ware was cast as one of Jane's identities in March, later revealed to be the former primary identity Miranda. Michelle Gomez was cast as Madame Rouge, a new series regular for the third season in March 2021. In April, Sebastian Croft and Ty Tennant were cast as the Dead Boy Detectives. Later that month Micah Joe Parker, Wynn Everett, Miles Mussenden, Anita Kalathara and Gina Hiraizumi were cast as members of the Sisterhood of Dada, while Madalyn Horcher was cast as a guest in connection with Sebastian Croft and Ty Tennant. In September 2022, Madeline Zima was cast as Casey Brinke for the fourth season, while Sendhil Ramamurthy joined the cast as Mr. 104 in a recurring capacity for the fourth season in October.

=== Filming ===
Principal photography for the first season began at the end of August 2018, in Olde Town Conyers, Georgia. Filming continued in Georgia throughout September, in Lawrenceville and at Briarcliff Mansion. Principal photography for the first season finished in April 2019.

Filming for the second season began November 2019 in Georgia.

Filming for the third season began in January 2021, and was wrapped in June.

Filming for the fourth season began in February 2022 and was completed in August.

== Release ==
The first season of Doom Patrol premiered on DC Universe on February 15, 2019, with episodes released until May 24. The first season consists of 15 episodes. A second season premiered on both DC Universe and HBO Max on June 25, 2020. The third season premiered on September 23, 2021, exclusively on HBO Max. The first half of the fourth season premiered on December 8, 2022, with the first two episodes of the season available immediately and the rest debuting on a weekly basis on HBO Max. The second half of the fourth season premiered on October 12, 2023 with the first two episodes, and the rest debuting on a weekly basis on Max until the series concluded on November 9.

In the United Kingdom, the first season was released exclusively on StarzPlay on January 2, 2020. The second season premiered on July 16, 2021, while the third season premiered on November 14 in the same year.

In Australia, the series is streamed on the Australian streaming service Binge.

== Reception ==
=== Critical response ===
Critical response of Doom Patrol
Season	Rotten Tomatoes	Metacritic
1	96% (53 reviews)	70 (18 reviews)
2	97% (29 reviews)	—N/a
3	100% (10 reviews)	—N/a
4	100% (12 reviews)	—N/a

On review aggregator Rotten Tomatoes, the first season holds a 96% approval rating based on 53 reviews, with an average rating of 8/10. The website's critical consensus reads: "DC Universe finds breakout material in this iteration of Doom Patrol thanks to a fully committed cast and the writing's faith in weirdness." Metacritic, which uses a weighted average, assigned the series a score of 70 out of 100 based on reviews from 18 critics, indicating "generally favorable reviews".

Jesse Schedeen of IGN rated the series premiere 9.0 out of 10, praising its "wicked" sense of humor and the show's cast that "works incredibly well to form an entertaining dysfunctional family".

The second season holds a 97% approval rating on Rotten Tomatoes, based on 29 reviews with an average rating of 8.3/10. Its critical consensus reads: "As entertaining as the first, but with more emotional depth, Doom Patrol's second season explores darker corners without sacrificing any of its wonderful weirdness."

The third season has a 100% approval rating on Rotten Tomatoes, based on 10 reviews with an average rating of 7.9/10. Its critics consensus states: "By adding strange new spices and a heaping tablespoon of unconventional plotting, Doom Patrol remains an endearing bazaar of absurd delights."

The fourth and final season has received a 100% approval rating on Rotten Tomatoes, based on 12 reviews with an average rating of 7.5/10. Its critics consensus states: "A dream team of DC Universe misfits take a worthy final bow in a fourth and final season that stays true to its perverse and quirky heart."

=== Accolades ===
Year	Award	Category	Nominee(s)	Result	Ref.
2019	American Society of Cinematographers Awards	Motion Picture, Miniseries, or Pilot Made for Television	Chris Manley	Nominated	
2019	Golden Trailer Awards	Best WildPosts for a TV/Streaming Series	Doom Patrol "Character Posters", Warner Bros., WB Worldwide Television Marketing In House	Nominated	
2019	Imagen Awards	Best Actress – Television	Diane Guerrero	Nominated	
2019	Saturn Awards	Best Streaming Superhero Television Series	Doom Patrol	Nominated	
2019	Harvey Awards	Best Comics Adaptation Award	Doom Patrol	Nominated	
2021	Critics' Choice Super Awards	Best Actress in a Superhero Series	Diane Guerrero	Nominated	
2021	Critics' Choice Super Awards	Best Superhero Series	Doom Patrol	Nominated	
2021	Primetime Emmy Awards	Outstanding Stunt Coordination	Thom Williams	Nominated	
2022	Critics' Choice Super Awards	Best Superhero Series	Doom Patrol	Nominated	
2022	Critics' Choice Super Awards	Best Actor in a Superhero Series	Brendan Fraser	Nominated	
2022	GLAAD Media Awards	Outstanding Drama Series	Doom Patrol	Nominated	
2024	Saturn Awards	Best Superhero Television Series	Doom Patrol	Nominated	

== Further media ==
=== Titans ===
Rita Farr, Larry Trainor, and Cliff Steele from the Doom Patrol continuity were intended to appear in the original season 1 finale of Titans. The appearances were removed after the original season finale was pulled.

The Titans version of Cyborg appears in the season 4 episodes "Dude, Where's My Gar" and "Game Over", with Joivan Wade reprising the role.

=== Arrowverse ===
The Doom Patrol incarnations of Jane, Rita Farr, Vic Stone, Larry Trainor, and Cliff Steele make cameo appearances in the Arrowverse crossover event "Crisis on Infinite Earths", which depicts the series as taking place on the world of Earth-21. Diane Guerrero, April Bowlby, Joivan Wade, Matthew Zuk, and Riley Shanahan appear in their respective roles from Doom Patrol through archival footage.
