= Chief (DC Comics) =

Fictional character in DC Comics

- The Chief as depicted in Teen Titans vol. 3 #35 (June 2006). Art by Tony Daniel.

Publication information
- Publisher: DC Comics
- First appearance: My Greatest Adventure #80 (June 1963)
- Created by: Arnold Drake; Bruno Premiani

In-story information
- Alter ego: Niles Caulder
- Species: Human
- Team affiliations: Doom Patrol
- Abilities: Genius-level intellect; Expert surgeon

The Chief (Niles Caulder) is a superhero appearing in American comic books published by DC Comics, usually as the leader of the superhero team Doom Patrol. Created by Arnold Drake and Bruno Premiani, he made his debut alongside the other original members of the Doom Patrol in My Greatest Adventure #80 (June 1963). Despite sharing similarities with Professor X, he is human.

The Chief made his first live-action appearance on the DC Universe / HBO Max series Titans, played by Bruno Bichir. In DC Universe / Max's eponymous Doom Patrol series, he was portrayed by Timothy Dalton.

== Publication history ==
He first appeared in My Greatest Adventure #80 (June 1963) and was created by Arnold Drake and Bruno Premiani. According to Drake, the issue's co-writer Bob Haney was not brought on to the project until after the Chief was created.

Drake confirmed in an interview that the Chief was inspired by the works of Arthur Conan Doyle, specifically Sherlock Holmes' elder brother, Mycroft.

== Fictional character biography ==
=== Pre-Crisis ===
Niles Caulder is a paraplegic with genius intelligence. Caulder uses his scientific knowledge to develop numerous inventions and innovations that have made him wealthy. Caulder founded and organized the team called Doom Patrol to protect the innocent and fight crime, and to teach humanity to accept others who live as ostracized "freaks," who have been radically transformed from terrible accidents. It is Caulder's genius that allowed the team members to survive (e.g., designing Robotman's body, devising Negative Man's medicated bandages), and helped grant their freakishness and abilities.

Caulder developed an interest in creating better life at a young age. Proving at a young age to be both a brilliant inventor and engineer, Caulder received funding from a mysterious benefactor. Thanks to the funding, Caulder succeeded in creating a chemical capable of prolonging life. Ultimately, it was revealed that the benefactor was General Immortus, who hired Caulder to create a chemical to replace the one that had been prolonging his life for centuries but was now failing. When the young scientist discovered the truth about his employer, he refused to continue the work. Immortus responded by implanting an explosive device in Caulder's torso, which he could set off remotely, and any attempt to remove it while Niles lived would also detonate it. Caulder eventually removed the bomb, but it rendered him paraplegic. The incident inspired and reminded Caulder that a better life may come from surviving a tragic event, such as his own.

In the early years of the Patrol, Caulder not only kept his true identity and appearance secret from the public; even his team knew him only as the Chief. In issue #88 (June 1964), their third battle against Immortus forces him to tell the rest of the Patrol his back-story and real name, which becomes common public knowledge for the rest of the original 1960s series.

=== Post-Crisis ===
Niles Caulder's back-history seemingly remained intact following the events of Crisis on Infinite Earths. However, when writer Grant Morrison took over the Doom Patrol title (starting with vol. 2 #19), they reimagined him as a cold, detached and somewhat mysterious individual. Near the end of their run, Morrison revealed that Caulder was responsible for the "accidents" that caused the original Doom Patrol members to gain their powers, since his personal philosophy is that true greatness comes through overcoming tragic events.

While volunteering for the Peace Corps in the 1960s in Calcutta, India, Niles Caulder met Arani Desai and the two fell in love. He gave her immortality on their wedding night and left her in a monastery in the Himalayas, sensing danger from his mysterious benefactor.

Caulder had been hired to develop a serum to increase a person's life span indefinitely. While working on the project, Caulder discovered that his mysterious benefactor was General Immortus. Immortus planted a bomb in Caulder's chest and would only remove it when Caulder had developed the serum. Immortus shot Caulder and while he was technically dead, his robot surgeon removed the bomb and revived him. Due to the robot's crude surgical technique, The Chief lost the use of his legs. Fearing that Immortus would never stop until he was dead, he decided to form a team of heroic misfits to fight Immortus. This team became the first incarnation of the Doom Patrol.

In keeping with the above retcon that he manipulated the original Doom Patrol's transformations, it is revealed that Caulder had also experimented on other characters in the world who would both benefit and destroy humanity. The most noted are a bitter group called the Brotherhood of Evil, a group of people who also live like "freaks", led by the Brain.

Towards the end of Grant Morrison's Doom Patrol run, Caulder is discovered working on a nanotechnology bomb that will destroy half the world and replace it with humans transformed into freaks of nature — his theory being that from the destruction would rise a better human race. He murders the original Tempest, Joshua Clay, to protect his secret but the Doom Patrol succeed in stopping his plans.

Chief's head as seen on the cover to Doom Patrol #67. Art by Tom Taggart.

During these events, the Chief is killed by a creation of Dorothy Spinner's known as the Candlemaker. Will Magnus builds a new body for the Chief, telling him that he should try helping the Patrol to make up for what he did. Becoming suicidal with guilt, the Chief states that he can never do enough to make up for his actions and uses his new body to rip off his head. His head survives and is preserved in a cryogenic chamber.

=== Infinite Crisis ===
After Superboy-Prime damages the barriers of reality in Infinite Crisis, certain events are rewritten, leading the Chief to regain his body. It has been revealed that he apparently still is responsible for the creation of the original members of the Patrol, though they claim to have forgiven him.

Caulder now seems to be intent on expanding the Doom Patrol's ranks; he has already convinced Beast Boy to return to the team and formally join it for the first time, and gotten Bumblebee and Vox to join. Robin doubts the Chief's motives, and after seeing him appear to manipulate Elasti-Girl, Robin accuses him of brainwashing the Doom Patrol by keeping them dependent on him. For his part, Caulder maintains that by joining the Doom Patrol, team members "won't have to be freaks anymore." Later, when Caulder is overheard telling Kid Devil that his teammates do not like him and he should join the Doom Patrol, the others finally see that he is controlling them with fear and self-loathing. While Caulder tells them that they need him, Mento finally takes off his helmet, allowing him to think clearly. Mento then informs the Chief that he is no longer their leader and if he ever speaks to Elasti-Girl or Beast Boy like that again, he will destroy Caulder's intellect. Shocked by this, the Chief rushes off to his lab.

During the "Blackest Night" event, Caulder is attacked by his former wife Celsius, who has been resurrected as a Black Lantern. Using her temperature control powers, Celsius freezes and shatters Caulder's legs. She then goes in for the kill, aiming to rip out his heart. Caulder is saved by the intervention of a man with a black hole for a face, who imprisons Celsius in an energy bubble. Unable to defeat the Black Lanterns, Caulder uses a warp gate to send them all to the Justice League, in hopes that they will be able to deal with the problem.

Caulder later gains the body of a Kryptonian, and successfully duplicates the ability to absorb yellow sun radiation into the cells from it, transforming himself into a "Superman". Caulder then attacks his team, before setting out to do their job himself. He steals every missile on the planet and dumps them in Antarctica, and attacks the United Nations in his attempts to make "a better world". He is only stopped when his laboratory computer, Millicent, transmits a sequence of lights through Robotman's eyes and into his own, neurologically shutting down Caulder's brain. His comatose body is placed in storage in Oolong Island.

=== The New 52 ===
In "The New 52", DC Comics' 2011 reboot of their universe, a young and healthy Niles Caulder is introduced in issue #4 of The Ravagers. Operating a deep underground science and engineering facility located beneath Los Angeles, he provides headquarters and combat training for the team in their campaign against the organization of N.O.W.H.E.R.E. Infiltrating the compound, Caulder is captured along with the rest of the Ravagers by Deathstroke on the behest of Harvest.

During the events of Forever Evil, it is revealed that Niles Caulder has created a Doom Patrol since his last appearance and seems to be free from Harvest. This Doom Patrol was killed by Crime Syndicate of America members Johnny Quick and Atomica except for Celsius and Tempest who according to Lex Luthor faked their deaths to escape him, prompting Caulder to make plans to "start over". Following the defeat of the Crime Syndicate, Caulder and the newly created Doom Patrol is introduced in issue #30 of Justice League. Membership consists of team's classic, 1963, lineup with Robotman, Elasti-Girl, Negative Man and - M.I.A. Justice League member - Element Woman.

=== Young Animal ===
The Doom Patrol in the Young Animal imprint is contacted by Niles Caulder in issue #7 and embark on a mission with him leading. The mission goes haywire and it is revealed that Niles Caulder is gambling again, leading the team to evict him as a leader and as a member of the team. This marks the team embracing being a new iteration of the Doom Patrol.

== Skills and equipment ==
Niles Caulder has proficiency in chemistry, electrical engineering, leadership, and robotics.

== Other versions ==
=== Teen Titans: Earth One ===
An alternate universe version of the Chief appears in Teen Titans: Earth One as a senior member of S.T.A.R. Labs.

=== Elseworlds ===
Alternate universe versions of the Chief makes minor appearances in the Elseworlds titles JLA: The Nail, Justice, and DC: The New Frontier.

== In other media ==
=== Television ===
- The Chief appears in the Batman: The Brave and the Bold episode "The Last Patrol!", voiced by Richard McGonagle. Following a failed mission and the Doom Patrol disbanding, this version retired until Batman reunites the Doom Patrol in the present after their enemies form an alliance to seek revenge. While Batman foils the alliance, the Doom Patrol sacrifice themselves to save a small town being threatened by the villains.
- The Chief appears in the "Doom Patrol" segment of DC Nation Shorts, voiced by Jeffrey Combs.
- The Chief appears in the Young Justice episode "Nightmare Monkeys", voiced by Scott Menville. This version died while on a mission with the Doom Patrol years prior to the series.
- The Chief appears in Teen Titans Go!, voiced by Larry Kenney. This version possesses a prehensile beard and has numerous weapons and gadgets built into his wheelchair.
- The Chief appears in the Titans episode "Doom Patrol", portrayed by Bruno Bichir.
- The Chief appears in Doom Patrol, portrayed by Timothy Dalton as an adult and Abigail Shapiro as a child. Similarly to the post-Crisis comics incarnation and separate Titans counterpart, this version transformed the future Doom Patrol members into metahumans in an attempt to protect his daughter Dorothy Spinner. Additionally, he formed and led an earlier incarnation of the Doom Patrol in the 1950s before they were defeated by Mr. Nobody and possesses a degree of immortality due to a talisman stolen from Nazi scientist Heinrich Von Fuchs. After giving the talisman to Willoughby Kipling to restore a shrunken Doom Patrol to normal size, the Chief works to stave off death so he can spend more time with Spinner before dying.

=== Film ===
The Chief makes a cameo appearance in Justice League: The New Frontier.

=== Video games ===
The Chief appears as a character summon in Scribblenauts Unmasked: A DC Comics Adventure.

=== Miscellaneous ===
The Chief appears in Batman: The Brave and the Bold #7.
