= Brotherhood of Dada =

Group of comic book supervillains

The Brotherhood of Dada is a group of supervillains appearing in comic books published by DC Comics. Enemies of the Doom Patrol, the Brotherhood is devoted to all things absurd and bizarre, taking their name from the Dada art movement. Though they would be considered villains by most definitions, the group does not recognize concepts of good and evil (hence the decision to rename themselves from the Brotherhood of Evil), but simply aloof; they are perhaps best described as anarchic rogues. The group first appeared in the September 1989 issue of Doom Patrol, #26 of the second series. The Brotherhood of Dada was created by Grant Morrison.

A gender-swapped version of the group called the Sisterhood of Dada appear in the third season of the HBO Max series Doom Patrol.

== Fictional team history ==
Mister Morden was a former member of the Brotherhood of Evil who went into hiding after incurring their wrath. He underwent a series of experiments that turned him into Mr. Nobody. After his recent metamorphosis he then traveled far and wide, ultimately gathering together Sleepwalk, who had vast strength only when sleepwalking; Frenzy, a large, garishly-dressed dyslexic Jamaican man who could transform into a whirling cyclone; Fog, who could absorb humans into his being when in his gaseous form; and the Quiz, a Japanese woman who literally had "every superpower you haven't thought of yet" and wore a hazmat suit at all times due to her pathological fear of dirt.

The Brotherhood stole a magical painting and used it to transport Paris into another reality composed of realms based on philosophical concepts and schools of art. Their plan was foiled by the Doom Patrol, but they chose to remain in the strange alternate realm.

Later, Mr. Nobody escaped from the painting with the help of four members of his new Brotherhood: Agent "!", who could blend into any crowd; Alias the Blur, the ghost of a mirror that can eat time; Number None, the abstract concept of everything that goes wrong in a person's day; and the Love Glove, whose power depends on what glove he wears. They stole the bicycle of Albert Hofmann, and used its lysergic resonance to power Mr Nobody's presidential campaign. However, the US Government sent another super-powered agent, Yankee Doodle Dandy, after them. Despite the best efforts of the Doom Patrol, the Brotherhood members were killed by Dandy and the Painting That Ate Paris almost entirely destroyed. The only member left was the Toy, who was late for the meeting. This was not the end of the Painting, as a girl was later seen picking a piece of it and using it as a slingshot to hurl a rock to break a government window, as the fragment started regrowing. It was later revealed the fragment had grown to mural size and is now installed in Dayton Manor in Prague.

In Infinite Crisis, a member of H.I.V.E. mentioned seeing Punch and Jewelee at a "Save the Brotherhood of Dada" rally.

== Members ==
=== First Brotherhood ===
Brotherhood of Dada

Publication information
- Publisher: DC Comics
- First appearance: Doom Patrol, #26
- Created by: Grant Morrison

In-story information
- Member(s): The Fog, The Quiz, Frenzy, Sleepwalk, Mr. Nobody

==== The Fog ====
Byron Shelley gained the ability to turn into a psychedelic death cloud capable of absorbing people. The people he absorbed could still communicate, and the voices started to drive him mad. After he absorbed Doom Patrol member Crazy Jane, she and her multiple personalities traumatized the people inside him and the Fog vomited her out. He was apparently named after poets Lord Byron and Percy Bysshe Shelley.

==== Frenzy ====
Lloyd Malcolm Jefferson was an illiterate man of Jamaican-American descent whose mother had abandoned him. He wore a garish outfit covered with symbols, a top hat with a green flower, and two bicycle wheels on his back. He could turn into a living cyclone.

==== Sleepwalk ====
Holly McKenzie was a British girl who had tremendous strength, but only when she was asleep. To avoid waking, she took sleeping pills and wore headphones that played Barry Manilow. She had the outlines of two faces painted around her eyes.

==== The Quiz ====
A Japanese woman with a fear of dirt, The Quiz had every power not named by others. Because of her fear of dirt, she wore a long gown/gas mask that was decorated with question marks similar to the Riddler's outfit. The powers she exhibited were: flight, mimicking appearances, turning people to glass, turning back time, dematerialization, making things large, turning people into toilets filled with flowers, and manifesting escape-proof spirit jars.

In post-Rebirth continuity, Quiz is named Sachiko after her Doom Patrol television counterpart.

=== Second Brotherhood ===
Brotherhood of Dada

Publication information
- Publisher: Vertigo Comics
- First appearance: Doom Patrol #49

In-story information
- Member(s): Agent "!", Alias the Blur, Number None, Love Glove, Mr. Nobody

==== Agent "!" ====
Known otherwise only as "Malcolm", Agent "!" is a homeless man from Venice, Italy, who dresses in a garish outfit decorated with exclamation marks. His chest is a gilded cage containing a miniature jet with bird-like feet. Despite his odd appearance, he has the power of "coming as no surprise" which allows him and anyone around him to be unnoticed or any attacks made by them to be seemingly out of nowhere, essentially giving him a form of invisibility. He mentions his desire to find the element of surprise, which may mean that his powers of "stealth" are not what he wants; Malcolm finds the element at last when dying during the final battle between the Brotherhood and the government.

==== Alias the Blur ====
Ilse Krauss, an actress, falls in love with her own reflection. As she gets older, the reflection changes and Ilse's madness drives her to believe that her reflective lover was kidnapped and replaced. In retaliation, she scars the mirror with battery acid, shoots herself, and is rendered comatose. The mirror is awakened by the dream-vibrations of Mister Nobody and becomes a fractured ghost who can accelerate aging. Blur follows Mister Nobody on the campaign trail to win the presidency before the battle with John Dandy, where it is freed of its tortured existence and Ilse dies.

==== Number None ====
Number None, also known as the Secret Identity, is neither a specific person or thing. Number None is anything or anyone that can get in someone's way. As Mister Nobody put it, "Everybody and everything, at some time or another, is Number None". It first appears as a door that Agent "!" walks into, signaling its joining of the Brotherhood.

==== The Love Glove ====
Bobby Carmichael is obsessed with the Sixties, and spends much of his time hanging around in record shops or going out to clubs. After encountering the "Glove Tree", a mysterious tree with gloves instead of leaves, in a dream, he gains the ability to access the Tree via a vortex and use any of its gloves. His gloves include the Shove Glove, which possesses enormous strength, and the Techno Glove, which grants him mechanical knowledge and expertise.

==== The Toy ====
The Toy was the only living member of the Brotherhood of Dada, having been late to the rally where her teammates were killed. Her origin and powers are unknown, but she has a distinctive look: the lower half of her face is locked behind something similar to Hannibal Lecter's mask, only combined with a Mr. Potato Head. A set of plastic lips are affixed to the mask, and a set of toothbrushes have been grafted on as ears. She wears a shirt that says "Play with Me" under a vest with pronounced shoulder pads.

== In other media ==
- Byron Shelley appears in Superboy. This version is a vampire and the son of Dracula.
- The Brotherhood of Dada, renamed the Sisterhood of Dada, appears in the third season of Doom Patrol, consisting of Shelley Byron / The Fog (portrayed by Wynn Everett), Lloyd / Frenzy (portrayed by Miles Mussenden), Holly / Sleepwalk (portrayed by Anita Kalathara), Malcolm / Agent "!" (portrayed by Micah Joe Parker), and Sachiko / Quiz (portrayed by Gina Hiraizumi).
