= Mr. Nobody (comics) =

- Mr. Nobody as depicted in Doom Patrol (vol. 2) #26 (September 1989). Art by Richard Case (penciler), John Nyberg (inker), Daniel Vozzo (colorist), and John Workman (letterer).

Publication information
- Publisher: DC Comics
- First appearance: As Eric Morden: Doom Patrol #86 (March 1964); As Mr. Nobody: Doom Patrol (vol. 2) #26 (September 1989)
- Created by: As Eric Morden: Arnold Drake; Bruno Premiani; As Mr. Nobody: Grant Morrison; Richard Case; John Nyberg

In-story information
- Alter ego: Eric Morden
- Species: Metahuman
- Team affiliations: Mister Somebody Enterprises; Brotherhood of Dada; Brotherhood of Evil
- Notable aliases: Mr. Somebody, Thayer Jost
- Abilities: Ability to possess people (as Mr. Somebody): Reality warping; Vast psionic abilities; Nigh-omnipotence; Immortality

Mr. Nobody (Eric Morden) is a fictional character appearing in American comic books published by DC Comics. He is the founder of the Brotherhood of Dada and an enemy of the Doom Patrol. Introduced as Morden in Doom Patrol #86 (March 1964), the character was re-envisioned as Mr. Nobody for Doom Patrol vol. 2 #26 (September 1989).

The character appears in the first season of the DC Universe television series Doom Patrol, portrayed by Alan Tudyk.

== Fictional character biography ==
Mr. Nobody's real name is Eric Morden. He appeared in Doom Patrol #86 (1964) as a member of the Brotherhood of Evil. In this appearance, he steals Rog, a robot designed by the Chief for lunar exploration.

When Eric Morden reappears in the second volume of Doom Patrol (1989), it is explained that he had hidden in Paraguay after the Brain and Monsieur Mallah threatened to kill him. Still longing to be a part of society again, Morden undergoes experiments by an ex-Nazi scientist that turns him into an abstract shadow-like entity with the ability to drain the sanity from human beings; along with reality-warping and nigh-omnipotence. However, he is driven insane and forms the Brotherhood of Dada instead.

Mr. Nobody recruits several bizarrely-powered individuals - Sleepwalk, Frenzy, Fog, and the Quiz - to form the first Brotherhood of Dada. The Brotherhood steals a psychoactive painting and uses it to absorb Paris along with several members of the Doom Patrol. They also unwittingly unleash "the fifth Horseman of the Apocalypse" from the painting and are forced to help the Doom Patrol stop it. Crazy Jane harnesses the power of the painting to transform the Horseman into a hobby-horse, releasing her teammates and the city of Paris and trapping Nobody and his Brotherhood within the painting.

Later, Mr. Nobody escapes from the painting with the help of four members of his new Brotherhood of Dada, Agent "!", Alias the Blur, the Love Glove, and Number None. They steal the bicycle of Albert Hofmann and use its lysergic resonance to power Nobody's presidential campaign. The US Government, unwilling to let Nobody become president, sends a super-powered agent after him: John Dandy, a man whose face is blank but has six other faces floating around him. Dandy kills almost every member of the Brotherhood, including Nobody. He throws one of his faces at Nobody, rendering the latter powerless and defenseless. Dandy then impales the now-human Nobody on a broken pole and removes what is revealed to be a mask. Cliff Steele attempts to place the semiconscious Nobody back inside the painting but it was apparently destroyed by gunfire from government agents before Steele could do so. Nobody then seems to disintegrate.

Mr. Nobody returns, this time white instead of black and with the ability to possess others. He now calls himself Mr. Somebody. He inhabits the body of billionaire Thayer Jost and controls MSE (Mister Somebody Enterprises) for his own mysterious goals. Through MSE, he has leveled Danny the Street into Danny the Brick with his multidimensional gentrifiers and created the Front Men, a metahuman team with the public goal of being a police to the superhuman community. He manipulates the press and public, making them appear to be heroes who are under attack by the rogue Doom Patrol. He travels to Oolong Island where he takes control of Veronica Cale to further his goals. He nearly defeats the Doom Patrol, but is stopped by Ambush Bug who reveals to him that the title is about to be cancelled, and the universe will soon be rebooting anyway. Nobody abruptly vacates Cale's body and vanishes.

In 2016, DC Comics implemented another relaunch of its books called "DC Rebirth" which restored its continuity to a form much as it was prior to "The New 52". Mister Nobody was first seen as a statue in Dannyland. He is also the father of Terry None, who gave birth to a Superman clone called Milkman Man when she came in contact with Casey Brinke.

As part of the Young Animal imprint, Mr. Nobody reappears in person with a plan to destroy reality using a foodstuff called $#!+ which, when triggered using Terry None, can destroy reality. Nobody, along with the Doom Patrol and Brotherhood of Nada, end up outside of reality at a location called Outer Heaven. There, he is chosen to be never ending entertainment for Eonymous, universe-destroying gods who can only be distracted with entertainment. He chooses to stay and forces Terry to stay with him as well.

== Powers and abilities ==
After being transformed into Mr. Nobody, Eric Morden gained godlike abilities at the cost of his humanity and sanity. His unique physiology allows bullets to pass through him harmlessly, making it so that others can only view Mr. Nobody from the corner of their eyes, regardless of where they are looking. It is impossible to see Mr. Nobody, as everyone sees him differently.

He can also warp reality, drain the sanity of others, possess their bodies, shapeshift, bestow powers onto others, create objects and living beings, and teleport through time and space.

== In other media ==
- Eric Morden appears in the "Doom Patrol" segments of DC Nation Shorts, voiced by Jeffrey Combs.
- Mr. Nobody appears in Doom Patrol, portrayed by Alan Tudyk. This version was a low level criminal in the Brotherhood of Evil during the 1940s until he was replaced by Monsieur Mallah, causing him to lose his girlfriend Millie in the process. Wanting to be more than a "nobody", Morden traveled to Paraguay to undergo an experimental procedure meant to grant him metahuman powers, gaining nigh-omnipotence.
