= Watts (surname) =

Watts is a surname, and may refer to:

== Arts and entertainment ==
- Alaric Alexander Watts (1797–1864), British poet and journalist
- Caroline Watts, British artist
- Danièle Watts, American actress
- David G. Watts, British game designer
- George Frederic Watts, British painter and sculptor
- Heather Watts, American ballerina and dancer
- Jon Watts, American filmmaker
- Julia Watts, American author
- Julie Watts (born 1950), Australian author and publisher
- Julie Watts, West Australian poet, winner of the Blake Poetry Prize in 2017
- Mary Stanbery Watts (1868–1958), American novelist
- Naomi Watts, British actress
- Peter Watts (author), Canadian author and biologist
- Richard Watts, Jr., American theater critic
- Robert Watts, British film producer
- Robert Watts (artist), American artist
- Rolonda Watts, American actress and talk show host
- Stanley J. Watts, American artist
- Theodore Watts-Dunton, British poet and critic
- Tim Watts (filmmaker), British filmmaker
- Walter Henry Watts (1776–1842), British artist and journalist

=== Music ===
- André Watts, German-American pianist
- Charlie Watts (1941–2021), British drummer of The Rolling Stones
- Clem Watts, pseudonym of Al Trace, a prolific American songwriter and orchestra leader
- Elizabeth Watts, British soprano
- Ernie Watts, American jazz saxophonist
- Helen Watts, Welsh singer
- Isaac Watts (1674–1748), English hymn-writer, theologian, and logician
- Ivo Watts-Russell, indie music entrepreneur
- Jeff "Tain" Watts, American jazz drummer
- John Watts (composer)
- Lou Watts, British musician in the band Chumbawamba
- Lyndon Watts, Australian bassoonist
- Nathan Watts, American bass guitar player
- Pete Overend Watts (1947–2017), English rock bassist, founding member of Mott the Hoople
- Raymond Watts, American musician and member of the band PIG
- Reggie Watts, American comedian and musician
- Mason Watts, Australian singer, member of the band Midnight Til Morning

== Crime ==
- Christopher Lee Watts (born 1985), perpetrator of the Watts family murders (2018)
- Coral Eugene Watts (1953–2007), American murderer
- Joe Watts, American mobster

== Law ==
- Richard C. Watts (1853–1930), an Associate Justice of the South Carolina Supreme Court
- Shirley M. Watts (born 1959), a Judge of the Maryland Court of Appeals

== Military and naval ==
- John Watts (sailor) (c. 1778–1823), U.S. merchant captain from Virginia
- John Cliffe Watts (1786–1873), British military officer and colonial architect in New South Wales
- John Watts de Peyster (1821–1907), author on the art of war, philanthropist, and early Adjutant General of the New York National Guard
- John Watts de Peyster Jr. (1841–1873), Union Army officer during the American Civil War
- Philip Watts (naval architect), British naval architect

== Politics ==
- Alfred Watts (South Australian politician) (1815–1884), South Australian businessman and politician
- Alfred Watts (Western Australian politician) (1873–1954), Australian politician
- Arthur Watts (politician) (1897–1970), Australian politician
- David Watts (politician), British politician
- J. C. Watts, American politician
- John Watts, postmaster of Oregon and disputed elector in the 1876 United States presidential election
- John Watts (Cherokee chief)
- John Watts (New York politician) (1749–1836), U.S. Representative from New York
- John Arthur Watts (1947–2016), British MP for Slough
- John C. Watts (1902–1971), U.S. Representative from Kentucky
- John Sebrie Watts (1816–1876), U.S. House Delegate from New Mexico Territory
- Lala Fay Watts (1881–1971), American suffragette, temperance advocate, and labor activist
- Thomas H. Watts, American politician, 18th Governor of the U.S. state of Alabama

== Science, medicine, and academia ==
- Becky Watts, British college student who was murdered by her family
- David P. Watts, American anthropologist
- Duncan J. Watts, American sociologist
- Frederick Watts, the "Father of Penn State"
- James W. Watts, American neurosurgeon and early pioneer of lobotomy
- Michael Watts, American geographer
- Ronald Lampman Watts, Canadian academic
- Susan Watts, British science journalist
- Victor Watts (1938–2002), British toponymist, medievalist, translator, and academic

== Sports ==
- Annette Watts (born 1959), American basketball player and coach
- Antonio Watts (born 2003), American football player
- Armani Watts (born 1996), American football player
- Armon Watts (born 1996), American football player
- Bill Watts, American professional wrestler
- Bobby 'Boogaloo' Watts, American boxer
- Brandon Watts, American football player
- Darius Watts, American football player
- Duece Watts (born 1999), American football player
- Eric Watts (born 2000), American football player
- Erik Watts, American professional wrestler
- Fergus Watts, Australian footballer
- Fraser Watts, Scottish cricketer
- John Watts, Australian sportsman and broadcaster
- Johnny Watts (English footballer), English football player for Birmingham City F.C.
- Markees Watts (born 1999), American football player
- Phat Watts (born 1999), American football player
- Quincy Watts, American athlete
- R. N. Watts, American college sports coach
- Rocket Watts (born 2000), American basketball player
- Slick Watts (1951–2025), American basketball player
- Stan Watts, American basketball coach
- Vanessa Watts, West Indian cricketer
- Wallace Watts, Wales rugby union international
- Wally Watts, Australian footballer
- Xavier Watts (born 2001), American football player

== Fictional characters ==
- Albie Watts, a fictional character in the British soap opera EastEnders
- Angie Watts, a fictional character in the British soap opera EastEnders
- Arthur Watts, a major antagonist in the animated web series RWBY
- Chrissie Watts, a fictional character in the British soap opera EastEnders
- Curly Watts, in the ITV soap opera Coronation Street
- Den Watts, a fictional character in the British soap opera EastEnders
- Peter Watts, in the TV series Millennium
- Raquel Watts, in the ITV soap opera Coronation Street
- Sharon Watts, a fictional character in the British soap opera EastEnders
- Wade Owen Watts, protagonist in the novel Ready Player One and its film adaptation
- Watts, main character in the film Some Kind of Wonderful

== Other ==
- Alan Watts, English philosopher
- Anthony Watts (blogger), American blogger and former television weatherman
- C. C. Watts (pastor) Charles Cameron Watts (1895–1965), Australian Congregationalist pastor
- Daniel Watts, multiple people
- Franklin Watts, an imprint of U.S. publisher Grolier
- George Washington Watts, financier and manufacturer
- Graham Clive Watts, British construction administrator
- Henry Watts, multiple people
- Hugh Watts (bell-founder) (1582/3 – 1643), English bell-founder
- John Watts of the Leake and Watt's Children's Home
- Peter Watts, multiple people
- Philip Watts, British businessman
- Richard Watts, British businessman and philanthropist
- Sara Virginia Ecker Watts, First Lady of North Carolina
- William Watts (East India Company official) of the British East India Company
- Watts family murders

== See also ==
- Watts (disambiguation)
- Watt (surname)
