= Henry Watts =

Henry Watts may refer to:

- Henry Watts (botanist) (1828–1889), Australian amateur collector of algae specimens
- Henry Watts (chemist) (1815–1884), English chemist
- Henry Edward Watts (1826–1904), British journalist and author
- Henry M. Watts (1817–1894), American lawyer, politician, and diplomat

== See also ==
- Henry Watt (disambiguation)
- Henry (given name)
- Watts (surname)
