= Johnston de Peyster =

American politician and soldier

Col. Johnston de Peyster
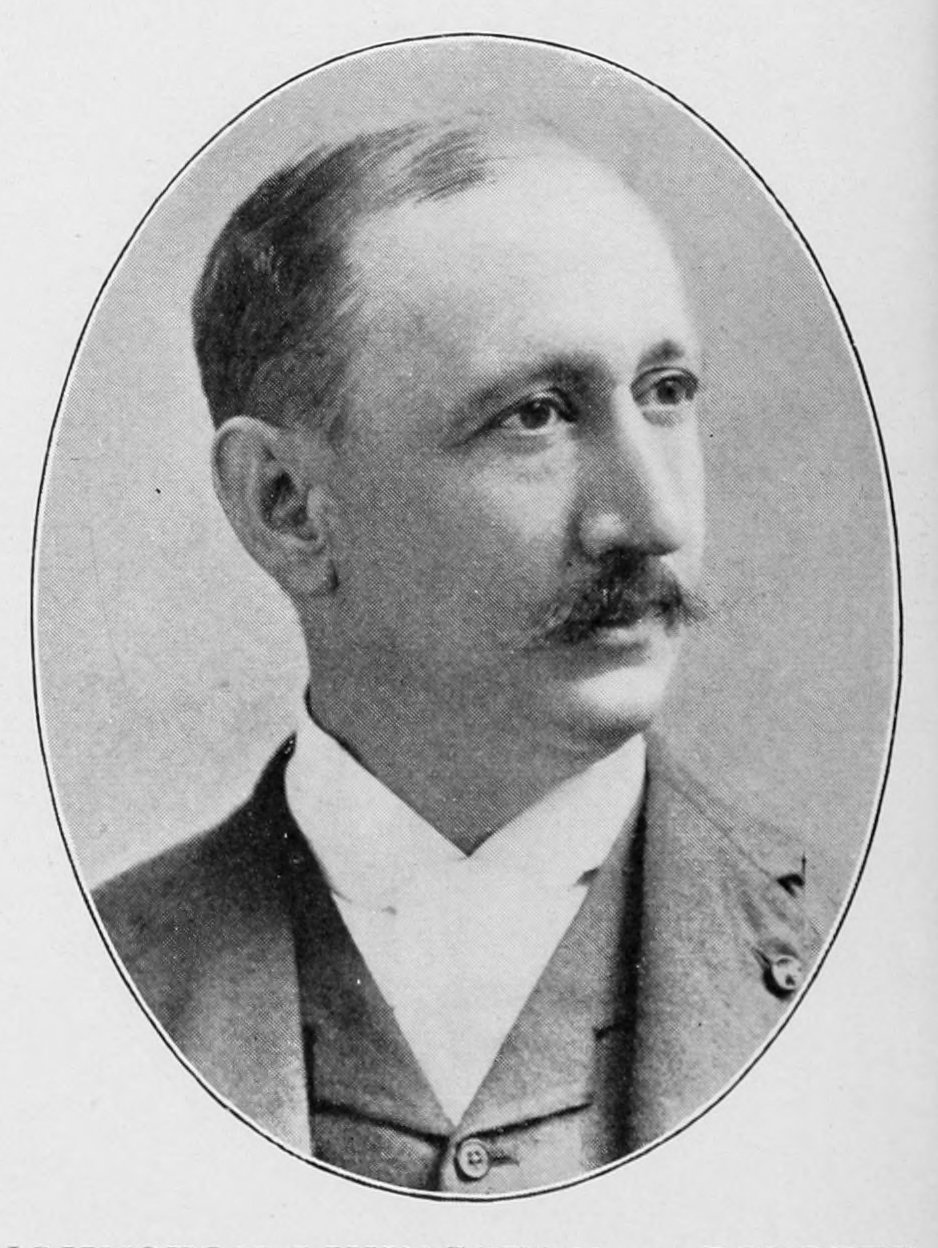

Mayor of Tivoli-on-Hudson
- In office January 1, 1900 – May 27, 1903

Member of the New York State Assembly for Dutchess Co.
- In office January 1, 1889 – December 31, 1890
- Preceded by: John I. Platt
- Succeeded by: Edward B. Osborne

Personal details
- Born: Johnston Livingston de Peyster; June 14, 1846 Tivoli, New York
- Died: May 27, 1903 (aged 56) Tivoli, New York
- Party: Republican
- Spouse: Julia Anna Toler
- Relations: John de Peyster Jr. (brother); Frederic de Peyster (grandfather)
- Children: 3
- Parent(s): John Watts de Peyster; Estelle Livingston

Johnston Livingston de Peyster (June 14, 1846 – May 27, 1903) was a soldier in the Union Army during the American Civil War and later a member of the New York State Assembly from Dutchess County, New York. The son of a wealthy old Dutchess County family, de Peyster joined the Union Army at the age of eighteen. He saw service in the eastern theater, and is best remembered for raising the first Union flag over the Confederate capitol of Richmond, Virginia, after its fall in 1865.

After the war, de Peyster served overseas as a dignitary. When he returned to the United States, he ran for office and was elected to the State Assembly. His father disagreed with many of his political positions, and they eventually stopped speaking to each other. In 1900, the family feud culminated in a race for the office of Mayor of their native town, father running against son. After defeating his father, who owned the town hall, he was forced to move the Mayor's office to a new building. He died in 1903, survived by his three daughters.

== Early life ==
De Peyster was born on June 14, 1846, in Tivoli, New York, at his family's estate. He was a member of the wealthy de Peyster family of New York, son of Major General John Watts de Peyster (1821–1907) and Estelle Livingston. He was also the brother of Brigadier General John Watts de Peyster Jr. (1841–1873).

He was a second cousin of Maj. Gen. Philip Kearny (1815–1862), and his great-great-great-grandfather was Abraham de Peyster (1657–1728), an early Mayor of New York City, whose father was Johannes de Peyster (c. 1600–1685), a wealthy merchant.

== Career ==
At the start of the war in 1861, Johnston was fifteen years old and attending Highland Military College in Newburg, New York. He remained in school through 1862, but then left to raise a company for a regiment being organized in New York. De Peyster's father paid ten-dollar bounties to the men who signed the muster roll of his company. He was not able to assume command because of his age, and his family also felt he was too young for service. However, in the winter of 1863, he threatened to travel to Washington, D.C., and stand for examination for an officership with a colored regiment.

In 1864, at the age of eighteen, his family allowed him to join the Union Army as a second lieutenant. He was assigned to Company H of the 13th New York Heavy Artillery Regiment, assigned to the third division of XVIII Corps, Army of the James, commanded by Brig. Gen. Edward Winslow Hinks. The division was part of Major General Benjamin Butler's disastrous Bermuda Hundred Campaign and was engaged at Swift Creek on May 9. It was left behind at Bermuda Hundred while the first and second divisions traveled to join Lieutenant General Ulysses S. Grant at Cold Harbor with two divisions from the X Corps. He was stationed at Fort O'Rourke located in Norfolk, Virginia, where he contracted a fever and was sent home for six months, missing the unit's heaviest engagements at the siege of Petersburg and the second battle of Fair Oaks. The illness he contracted would plague him for the next eighteen years.

=== Richmond ===
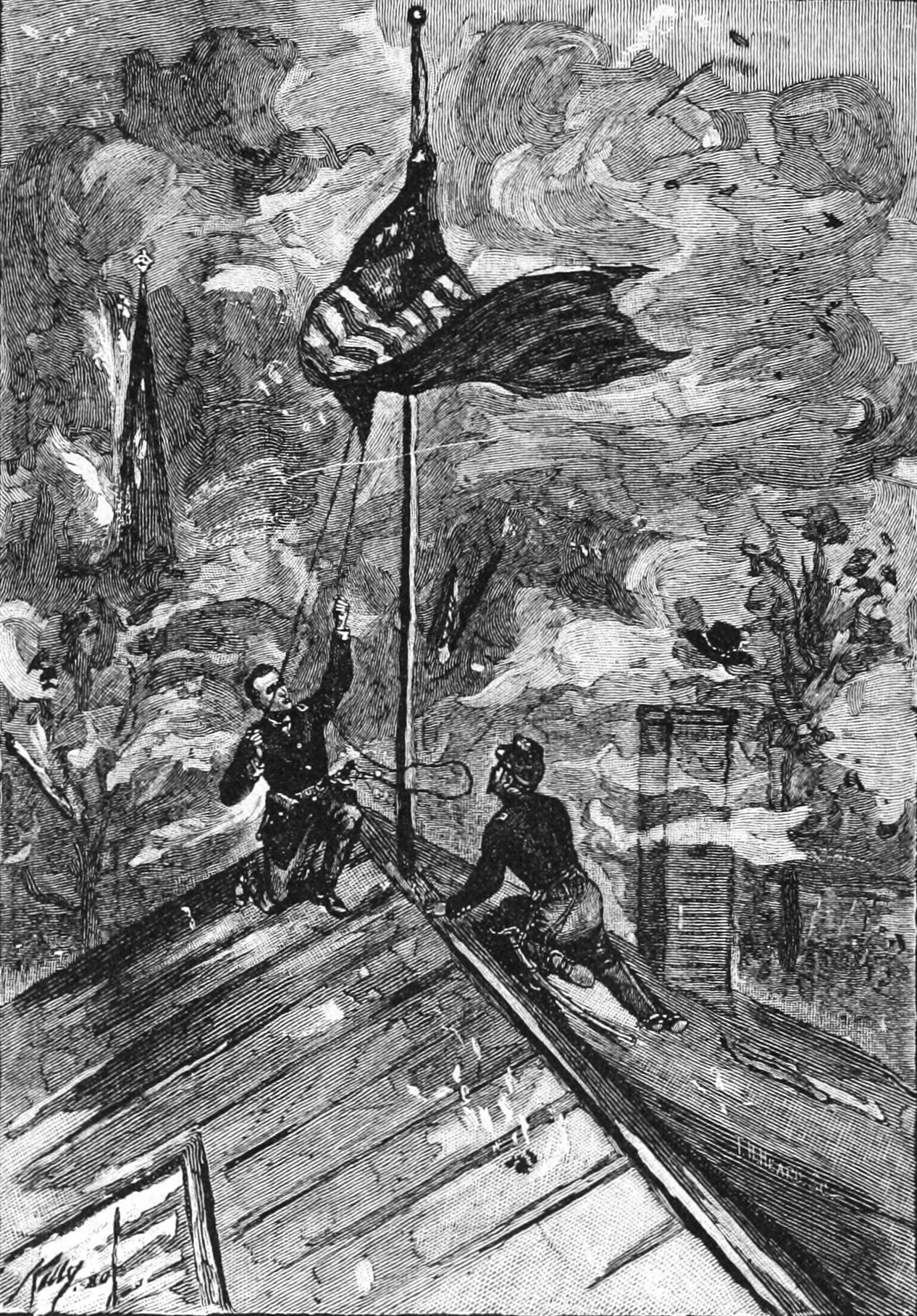
Lt. de Peyster raises the Stars and Stripes over the capitol of Richmond, Virginia, for the first time since it joined the Confederacy in 1861.

Upon his return, he joined the staff of Brigadier General George F. Shepley, commanding the military district of Norfolk. When General Shepley was assigned as Chief of Staff to the XXV Corps commanded by Major General Godfrey Weitzel, de Peyster became an aide to Weitzel, and eventually his chief of staff. The unit de Peyster had originally joined, the 13th New York, was also assigned in the XXV Corps. He is credited with raising the first Union flag over the Confederate capitol of Richmond, Virginia, after its fall. (Note: Another article on the cover of The New York Times, Thursday, April 27, 1865, stated that New Yorker Lieut. Johnston L. de Peyster, raised the first "real" American flag—that of the 12th Maine Volunteers—over the city of Richmond, "the central point of slavery." Those who helped raise the flag "should be remembered in the annals of this war emphatically for freedom." According to the Richmond Dispatch, February 10, 1893, Maj. A.H. Stevens had hoisted the guidons of the Fourth Massachusetts Volunteer Cavalry two hours earlier.) The flag was the same one that had been raised over the city of New Orleans, Louisiana, after its fall. Shepley had been the military Governor of New Orleans, and later the State of Louisiana while it flew there.

Initially, de Peyster had been selected to lead an assault on the breastworks outside the city, however the night before the assault he noticed the city aflame from a signal tower and informed General Weitzel. The men of the corps then entered the city unmolested. Admiral David Farragut later claimed that de Peyster was due as much credit as he would have received had he actually taken the city by storming it, because doing it without bloodshed still carried the same intent.

There was some dispute over who raised the first "flag" over the capitol in Richmond after it was learned that a Maj. A.H. Stevens had raised a guidon two hours before de Peyster hoisted the national flag, Ulysses S. Grant eventually declared that de Peyster should receive the credit because a guidon was not really a flag. Despite this, de Peyster's father, a military critic, was highly derogatory when writing about Grant and his achievements. The young lieutenant reflected on the incident in a letter to his mother:

Headquarters, Army of the James

Richmond, April 3, 1865.

My dearest mother,— This morning, about four o'clock, I was got up, just one hour after I retired, with the information that at six we were going to Richmond. At six we started. The rebs had gone at three, along a road strewn with all the munitions of war. Richmond was reached, but the barbarous South had consigned it to flames. The roar of the bursting shells was terrific.

Arriving at the capitol, I sprang from my horse, first unbuckling the stars and stripes, a large flag I had on the front of my saddle. With Captain Langdon, chief of artillery, I rushed up to the roof. Together we hoisted the first large flag over Richmond, and on the peak of the roof drank to its success.

In the capitol I found four flags—three rebel, one ours. I presented them all, as the conqueror, to General Weitzel. I have fulfilled my bet, and put the first large flag over richmond. I found two small guidons, took them down, and returned them to the Fourth Massachusetts Cavalry, where they belonged. I write from Jeff. Davis's private room.

I remain ever your affection son,

JOHNSTON

For this act, he received a brevet promotion to lieutenant colonel of volunteers, "for gallant and meritorious conduct, and for hoisting the first real American flag over Richmond, Va., after its capture by the Union forces, April 3, 1865, and as a testimonial of the zeal, fidelity, and courage with which he had maintained the honor of the State of New York in her efforts to enforce the laws of the United States, supremacy of the constitution, and a republican form of government". Shortly thereafter, he received another brevet promotion to colonel, although this order did not mention the flag raising incident. He opted not to go with General Weitzel and the XXV Corps to Texas, but instead resigned in June 1865. He thereafter was associated with Samuel W. Crawford in an unofficial capacity.

=== Later life ===
After the war, he returned to Tivoli, New York, and was active in the American Archaeological Association and the New York Yacht Club. He also joined the Military Order of the Loyal Legion of the United States and the General Society of Colonial Wars.

He was an attaché to Daniel Sickles when the former general was appointed Minister to Spain by President Grant.

He was elected to the New York State Assembly from Duchess county in 1889 and reelected for a second term. He then served as Mayor of his native village of Tivoli-on-Hudson for several terms, and President of the New York Society Library. He was active in philanthropy, and made numerous donations to libraries and historical societies.

=== Feud with father ===
Although he shared interests in both philanthropy and military affairs with his father, they eventually had a falling out while Johnston served as a State Assemblyman, and was bitterly opposed by his father in a vote on the 1889 World's Fair Bill. The feud became so heated that while Johnston was Mayor of Tivoli, his father, who owned the building where the town government met, barred his son from entering the building. The village government was forced to move to another building and remained there until 1894, when they finally returned to de Peyster's building. Another incident occurred and was reported in the press when Johnston's mother fell ill, and he visited her at the de Peyster family home and was violently assaulted by his father. The father went so far as to run against his son for Mayor of Tivoli in 1900, but was defeated in the general election.

== Personal life ==
He was married to Julia Anna "Annie" Toler and had three daughters:

- Estelle de Peyster (1872–1953), who married Edward Sturges Hosmer (1867–1921) in 1905.
- Mary Justine de Peyster (1875–1939), who married Henry Townsend Martin (d. 1915), brother of Frederick Townsend Martin, in 1906.
- Carola de Peyster (1882–1950), who married Garrett Bergh Kip (1877–1930), in 1903, and was a writer for Harper's Bazaar.

De Peyster died in 1903, predeceasing his father, as did all of his siblings.

== Notes ==
New York State Assembly
Preceded by John I. Platt	New York State Assembly; Dutchess County, 2nd District; 1889–1890	Succeeded by Edward B. Osborne
