= Robotman (Cliff Steele) =

- Portion of the cover of Secret Origins Annual #1 (1987). Art by John Byrne.

Publication information
- Publisher: DC Comics
- First appearance: My Greatest Adventure #80 (June 1963)
- Created by: Arnold Drake; Bruno Premiani

In-story information
- Alter ego: Clifford "Cliff" Steele
- Species: Human Cyborg
- Team affiliations: Doom Patrol; Justice League United; Justice League
- Notable aliases: Automaton; Robotman II; Cliff Fix-It; Planet Cliff
- Abilities: Superhuman strength, stamina, durability, and speed; Adhesion manipulation; Thermokinesis; Self-sustenance; Cyberpathy

Robotman (Clifford "Cliff" Steele, called Automaton in first two appearances) is a superhero appearing in American comic books published by DC Comics. He is best known as a member of the Doom Patrol, being the only character to appear in every version of the team since its introduction in June 1963.

Robotman has appeared in numerous television series. Robotman made his first live adaptation as a guest star on the Titans television series for DC Universe played by Jake Michaels. Riley Shanahan took over from Michaels in the role. He is part of the main cast of its spin-off Doom Patrol which is also on Max. Brendan Fraser provides the voice of Robotman and portrays Cliff Steele in flashbacks in the series.

== Publication history ==
Robotman first appeared in My Greatest Adventure #80 (June 1963) and was created by Arnold Drake and Bruno Premiani. According to Drake, the issue's co-writer Bob Haney was not brought on to the project until after Robotman was created. He commented on the character's original name, Automaton:

That name was pretty stupid. I've been responsible for a lot of stupid things, but that was one of the stupidest, so, within two issues, I figured that out and changed his name to Robotman.

At the time, Drake didn't realize that there had been a previous character named Robotman, published in 1942-1953 during the Golden Age of Comic Books. DC's previous Robotman also had a human brain.

Robotman was the only original member of the Doom Patrol to appear with the team's second incarnation, which debuted in Showcase #94-96 (August 1977-January 1978). The reboot was accompanied by Robotman getting a new body, which was designed by artist Joe Staton at writer Paul Kupperberg's request. Kupperberg explained:

I was looking to update the strip, I suppose, [and] wanted to put my mark on it. There was nothing wrong with the original body designed by Bruno Premiani. In fact, ain't no one come up with a better design. Like the team's roster, I should have left that alone, too.

Staton said he patterned Robotman's new body after a young John Byrne's fanzine contribution (Contemporary Pictorial Literature) of the robot character Rog-2000 "as a joke".

== Fictional character biography ==
Robotman is one of the founding members of the Doom Patrol, along with Negative Man and Elasti-Girl. He is the only character to appear in every version of the Doom Patrol.

=== Pre-Crisis on Infinite Earths ===
Cliff Steele became Robotman, initially dubbed Automaton, after the daredevil and race car driver was in an accident during the Indianapolis 500, destroying his body. Niles Caulder subsequently placed Cliff's intact brain into a robotic body. After the operation, Cliff suffered from frequent depression because he viewed himself as less than human. A background serial in Doom Patrol #s 100, 101, 103 & 105 (December 1965 – August 1966, within 30 months of his introduction) retconned that Caulder made a mistake in the operation, causing Steele to go on a rampage, which Caulder corrected when he recruited Steele for the Patrol.

Sales of Doom Patrol had waned, and the creative team chose to kill off the entire team, including Robotman, in the final issue, Doom Patrol #121 (September–October 1968). The Doom Patrol sacrificed their lives to prevent Madame Rouge and General Zahl from destroying the small fishing village of Codsville, Maine.

In Showcase #94 (September 1977), it was revealed that Cliff's brain survived and that Will Magnus had built him a new body. Cliff then joined a new Doom Patrol headed by a woman claiming to be Niles Caulder's wife, Arani. Refusing to believe that Niles was dead, she formed this new team to search for him and took his place as leader, calling herself Celsius due to her heat-and-cold-based powers.

=== Post-Crisis on Infinite Earths ===
Robotman's origin remained largely the same as his pre-Crisis origin save for the fact that it was revealed that Niles Caulder caused the accident that destroyed Cliff Steele's body. Cliff Steele was born in Brooklyn.

This team was eventually almost all killed in action, with Cliff voluntarily committing himself to an asylum in Doom Patrol (vol. 2) #19 (February 1989), having fallen into a state of depression due to his condition and the loss of his teammates. In particular, he was angry about being in a metal body and unable to enjoy the feeling and senses that humans take for granted. Caulder sent Magnus round to try to help Cliff. Magnus introduced him to a person with "worse problems than [his]": a woman called Crazy Jane. Cliff became Jane's guardian, eventually falling in love with her. Near the end of Grant Morrison's creative run on the title, Robotman’s human brain was revealed to have been replaced with a CPU, making him a robot in reality.

In Rachel Pollack's creative run, Cliff's artificial brain began to malfunction so Dorothy Spinner's Imaginary Friends "rebuilt" Cliff's old brain.

Cliff later met and began a relationship with a bisexual, transgender woman named Kate Godwin. At one point, Kate and Cliff merged and shared his memories.

=== Blackest Night ===
In the Doom Patrol's Blackest Night tie-in storyline, Robotman and Negative Man are attacked by Negative Woman, who has been revived as a member of the Black Lantern Corps. While they try to fight off their former comrade, Cliff is approached by his own brainless corpse, which has also been revived as a Black Lantern. Cliff correctly surmises that the ring powers his corpse, but finds removing it only causes a new body to regenerate instead. He and Negative Man trick the Black Lanterns into entering a warp gate to a JLA checkpoint then try to put the incident behind them.

=== The New 52 ===
In The New 52 reboot, a different version of the character debuted in the My Greatest Adventure miniseries in October 2011, written by Matt Kindt. This version of Cliff Steele is an adventurer and daredevil who agrees to be injected with experimental nanomachines designed to improve and repair his body. When he is involved in a fatal car crash during a high-speed race, the nanomachines respond by creating a robotic body to encase and protect his still living brain. Though he is initially distraught over his condition, the nanomachines prevent him from killing himself. After coming to terms with his new body, he becomes a freelance hero, assisted by a woman named Maddy, who was involved in the nanomachine project and blames herself for Cliff's condition.

Cliff has since re-appeared as a supporting character in the Metal Men comic featured in the anthology series Legends of Tomorrow.

=== Young Animal ===
In the "Young Animal" reboot, Cliff reappeared as a member of the latest incarnation of the Doom Patrol. In the iteration both his origin and romance with Crazy Jane return and saw Cliff and the new Doom Patrol protect Danny, a sentient 'world' within an ambulance, and the many citizens within Danny. When the universe is reset in Milk Wars, Cliff briefly regains his human body. Unable to re-adapt to his old life, Cliff drives himself off a cliff, destroying his biological body and returning to a robot one. During the Doom Patrol: Weight of the Worlds story arc Cliff constantly upgraded his new robot body so that he could better protect others, stemming from his insecurities about failing to protect others and being unable to live a 'normal' life. Cliff's upgrades escalated until he became an entire planet that threatened to integrate entire worlds within him so that they would be 'safe from hurt'. Cliff was eventually persuaded to stop by Jane, who helped to deconstruct him into a childlike robot body so that she could better emotionally heal him.

=== Dawn of DC ===
In the Knight Terrors event, Insomnia traps several members of Justice League Dark in his Knightmare Realm. Remaining awake through the chaos, Zatanna magically summons Robotman and defends Wonder Woman and Detective Chimp from Insomnia's Sleepless Knights and Sleeping Queen.

== Powers and abilities ==
Cliff's original robotic body possesses immense strength, stamina, durability, and speed. It was equipped with electromagnetic feet that enables him to scale upon metal walls, heat coils in the palms capable of melting dense materials, and an oxygen tank for sustaining his brain. Robotman once utilized a mobile video transceiver strapped on his chest plate to keep in constant communication with the team. Later bodies have featured other various functions, such as tool and weapon systems. Before the operation, he had excellent racing skills.

The New 52 version of Cliff's original robotic body is nanomachine-based, allowing him to change its shape when needed or repair itself from even the most severe damage. He is also capable of flight and underwater travel. After becoming human and destroying his body again, his new one was constructed by Keeg Bovo, who programmed it to unlock different upgrades whenever Robotman performs a good deed, such as self-duplication and elemental control.

== In other media ==
=== Television ===
Robotman as depicted in Teen Titans

- Robotman appears in the Teen Titans episode "Homecoming", voiced by Peter Onorati.
- Robotman appears in the Batman: The Brave and the Bold episode "The Last Patrol!", voiced by Henry Rollins. This version has become sullen over his indestructibility and makes several suicide attempts despite this. Following a failed mission and the Doom Patrol disbanding, he becomes a crash-test dummy for a car company. In the present, Batman reunites the Doom Patrol after the team's enemies form an alliance to seek revenge on them. While Batman foils the alliance, the Doom Patrol sacrifice themselves to save a town being threatened by the villains.
- Robotman appears in the "Doom Patrol" segment of DC Nation Shorts, voiced by David Kaye.
- Robotman appears in Young Justice, voiced by Khary Payton.
- Robotman appears in Teen Titans Go!, voiced by Flula Borg. This version had the Chief place his brain into a robot body so he could perform the "robot" more effectively and beat a rival.
- Robotman appears in the Titans episode "Doom Patrol", portrayed by Jake Michaels and voiced by Brendan Fraser.
  - Additionally, the Doom Patrol incarnation of Robotman (see below) appears in the episode "Game Over", with Riley Shanahan replacing Michaels.
- Robotman appears in Doom Patrol, portrayed by Riley Shanahan and voiced again by Brendan Fraser, who also portrays Robotman in flashbacks. This version lost his body in a car accident and left behind a daughter, Clara, who was adopted by Bump Weathers, a member of his pit crew.
  - The Doom Patrol incarnation of Robotman also appears in the Arrowverse crossover "Crisis on Infinite Earths" via archive footage of a deleted scene from the first season.

=== Film ===
Robotman makes a cameo appearance in Justice League: The New Frontier.
