= Peter Watts =

Peter Watts may refer to:

== Sportsmen ==
- Peter Watts (cricketer, born 1938) (1938–2023), former English cricketer
- Peter Watts (cricketer, born 1947), Malaysian-born former English cricketer

== Others ==
- Peter Watts (audio engineer) (born 1960), Audio Designer/ Manufacturer
- Peter Watts (author) (born 1958), science fiction writer and marine biologist
- Peter Watts (Millennium), fictional character on the 1996–99 American television show Millennium
- Peter Watts (musician) (1947–2017), bass guitarist for Mott the Hoople
- Peter Watts (road manager) (1946–1976), who worked for Pink Floyd; father of actress Naomi Watts

== See also ==
- Peter Fraser (screenwriter) (Alexander Peter Fordham Watt, 1915–1965), English screenwriter, playwright and short story writer known for Dancing with Crime (1947)
- Peter Watt (born 1969), former General Secretary of the Labour Party in the United Kingdom
- Watts (surname)
