= Negative Man =

Fictional character

- Negative Man's debut appearance in My Greatest Adventure #80. Art by Bruno Premiani.

Publication information
- Publisher: DC Comics
- First appearance: My Greatest Adventure #80 (June 1963)
- Created by: Bob Haney; Arnold Drake; Bruno Premiani

In-story information
- Alter ego: Lawrence Michael "Larry" Trainor
- Species: Metahuman
- Team affiliations: Doom Patrol; Justice League
- Notable aliases: N-Man; Neg-Man; Rebis
- Abilities: Radioactive "soul-self" grants: Flight; Intangibility; Energy absorption and projection

Negative Man (Lawrence Michael "Larry" Trainor) is a superhero appearing in American comic books published by DC Comics. The character was created by Bob Haney, Arnold Drake, and Bruno Premiani and made his first appearance in My Greatest Adventure #80 (June 1963).

Negative Man has appeared in numerous television series and films, such as guest appearances in Teen Titans, in which he is voiced by Judge Reinhold, and the live-action series Titans and Doom Patrol, where he is voiced by Matt Bomer.

== Publication history ==
The Larry Trainor incarnation of Negative Man first appeared in My Greatest Adventure #80 and was created by Bob Haney, Arnold Drake, and Bruno Premiani. Drake recalled:

I left [editor Murray Boltinoff's] office and bumped into Bob Haney in the hall. Bob was a real good friend of mine ... I asked him if he got an assignment from Bob Kanigher. He had this routine where he'd come up from Woodstock once a week and stay for two nights and get a couple of assignments from Kanigher and then go back home and write them. He said he didn't get an assignment from Kanigher, and I told him I had this assignment that I was about two-thirds through with, but I needed another character and maybe between us we could come up with something. We sat down and came up with this notion of a guy who has gone through a cloud of radioactivity and is bandaged from head to toe with these specially treated bandages that keep the radioactivity within him so he isn't injurious to others. The most novel aspect was Negative Man, the character who lives inside him who can only be outside of him for 60 seconds - and don't ask me why 60 seconds.

== Fictional character biography ==
=== Larry Trainor ===
The original Negative Man, Larry Trainor, is a founding member of the Doom Patrol, along with Elasti-Girl, Robotman, and Chief. The team view themselves as victims as much as heroes and their powers as an affliction rather than a blessing.

Trainor's career as a superhero begins when he is accidentally exposed to a radioactive field in the atmosphere while piloting a test plane, giving him the ability to release an intangible, radioactive spirit. However, he is weak and defenseless in this state and can only sustain the separation for a minute at a time without risking death. After his accident, Trainor is forced to wear specially treated bandages over his entire body to protect others from his radioactivity.

The Doom Patrol were killed off in Doom Patrol (vol. 2) #121 (September–October 1968) following declining sales, sacrificing themselves to save the village of Codsville. Negative Man survives, but loses his powers.

=== Larry Trainor and Valentina Vostok ===
In Showcase #94 (September 1977), the Negative Spirit reappears when it possesses a Russian cosmonaut, Colonel Valentina Vostok, who becomes Negative Woman. Initially, Vostok could transform herself into a radio-energy form, possessing the same capabilities as Trainor. Later, as with Trainor, it would emerge from her leaving her physically weak but in control of it and requiring her to wear special bandages just as Trainor had. After Trainor's return, he gains strength from being in Vostok's presence and pleads with her to return the negative being to him. He later breaks Reactron out of Belle Reve Penitentiary and after fitting him with a regulator, uses him to successfully draw the negative being out of Vostok. During an encounter with Garguax, the negative being is disrupted and returns to Vostok, but saves Trainor and in the process heals him completely, removing all radioactivity from his body. After this, Trainor works with the Patrol in a support capacity but occasionally enters combat using high tech weaponry.

Trainor later reunites with the energy being and becomes an active member of the Doom Patrol. He exhibits the ability to cover himself in negative energy instead of releasing it.

=== Rebis ===
The Negative Spirit later reveals itself to be amoral, intelligent, and capable of speech, and forcefully fuses with Trainor and his physician Eleanor Poole. Together the three entities form Rebis, a divine intersex person, who, again, must wear special bandages. Rebis has all of the memories of all three beings, and is as such a compound being, frequently referring to itself with plural pronouns. Rebis has a larger range of powers than those of either Trainor or Vostok; Rebis can fly, is psychic, is extraordinarily intelligent, and is immortal. Rebis' unique life cycle is based on an event called the Aenigma Regis, in which it throws off its old body and gives birth to a new version of itself; in describing its paradoxical existence, Rebis often likens itself to Russian dolls and an ouroboros.

Rebis temporarily leaves the Doom Patrol to complete the Aenigma Regis; part of this process involves working through the trauma caused by the death of Trainor and Poole's identities. At some point during this absence, Rebis also has intercourse with Kate Godwin, giving her superpowers. Rebis's old body is killed by the Candlemaker, but Rebis' new, presumably harmonized body soon returns to see the Candlemaker defeated.

=== Byrne incarnation ===
In 2004, the Doom Patrol was rebooted in a JLA storyline and new Doom Patrol series, both written and illustrated by John Byrne. In this version of the Doom Patrol, which ignored previous continuity, Trainor is once again Negative Man (although his negative-energy form now has the appearance of a black skeleton instead of a shadowy humanoid shape). After this series was canceled, the miniseries Infinite Crisis explained that this alteration had been caused by Superboy-Prime's attempts to escape from the extradimensional "heaven" he shared with Alexander Luthor Jr. and the Superman and Lois Lane of Earth-Two. When the Doom Patrol joins other heroes in fighting Superboy-Prime, Negative Man and the other Doom Patrol members (including former member Beast Boy) begin recalling their previous lives; all previous incarnations of the Doom Patrol are now in continuity, although the exact meaning of this is not yet clear.

=== Keith Giffen ===
Larry Trainor is once again a member of Doom Patrol. The negative energy being can now exist apart from Trainor's body for much longer than 60 seconds. During the Blackest Night, he fights against Black Lantern Valentina Vostok, pitting his Negative Spirit against the corrupt Black Lantern version and starts convulsing in pain after absorbing both entities. Managing to take control of them, he sends them into Valentina, overloading her and destroying her ring. However, when he recovers, he cannot repeat the same attack against Black Lantern Cliff Steele before Black Lanterns Celsius and Tempest attack. Robotman comments that the combined form of both entities is partially similar to Rebis.

It is revealed that Larry's original body was destroyed in the Codsville explosion and that the "Negative" is in fact Larry (mind, consciousness, and soul); when he found himself without a physical body, Larry took solace in Valentina Vostok, but only temporarily, until The Chief cloned him a new body. When one of the bodies expires, Larry takes residence in a genetically altered, brain-dead donor body. In the transaction Larry obtains the memories and experiences of every host and the experience can be maddening to him, so Larry constantly reminds himself that he is Larry Trainor.

=== The New 52 ===
In The New 52 continuity reboot, Negative Man is actually the second host of the Negative Spirit as Negative Woman predates his tenure on the team. Part of Niles Caulder's second incarnation of the Doom Patrol, Negative Man and the team went on a mission to capture the Ring of Volthoom which had attached itself onto a woman named Jessica Cruz. Their mission put them in opposition to the Justice League, where Niles sought to lobotomize Cruz when Volthoom took control over her body. During the battle, Negative Man does not use any of his powers; it is implied that the New 52 version of the Negative Spirit is a violent entity that is so powerful, that Niles forbids Larry from using it in battle unless Niles explicitly orders him to unleash it. The battle ends when Batman is able to help Jessica Cruz regain control over her body and the power ring that has now bonded to her hand.

=== Young Animal ===
Some time later, Larry was mysteriously beamed to what was known as "The Negative Space" and separated from his negative spirit Keeg Bovo. After being sent back to Earth, Larry was reunited with his fellow former Doom and contacted by Keeg Bovo, who invited Larry to return to the Negative Space for trial. Trainor, Bovo, and Robotman went to the Negative Space and, despite Trainor being sentenced to continue being connected to Bovo, Robotman talked the council out of their decision, stating it was only fair for Larry to decide if he wanted to continue the connection or be normal. Larry chose to continue being Negative Man and accepted Bovo, knowing that in this way he could continue helping people. As a parting gift, the council modified his abilities so that whenever the Negative Spirit is released and Larry is unconscious, he experiences an entire normal human lifecycle, as a way to allow him to have the chance to feel normal. Many different negative spirits are seen at the trial.

== Powers and abilities ==
When Larry Trainor was accidentally sent to a field of cosmic radiation while testing out an experimental jet into the stratosphere and crash landed back on Earth, his physiology had been changed permanently and requires the Chief's lead-lined bandages so he could operate in human society. Negative Man has the ability to release a black, radioactive energy form from within his own body. His mind and consciousness functions inside the being, while Larry's body is left behind as a husk. In this form, he can fly at supersonic speeds, phase through solid objects, and absorb thermal energy to convert it into an explosive discharge or generate waves of intense heat. Originally, Larry could also stay separated from his body for only sixty seconds. By now, he also has trained himself to last much longer before leaving it at will. As Larry, he is also an expert in aviation and military protocol.

== In other media ==
=== Television ===
==== Animation ====
- Negative Man appears in the Teen Titans two-part episode "Homecoming", voiced by Judge Reinhold.
- Negative Man appears in the Batman: The Brave and the Bold episode "The Last Patrol!", voiced by David K. Hill. This version became a failed carnival entertainer after the Doom Patrol disbanded years prior. In the present, Batman brings the Doom Patrol back together after the team's enemies ally to seek revenge on them. While Batman defeats the alliance, the Doom Patrol sacrifice themselves to save a town being threatened by the villains.
- Negative Man appears in the "Doom Patrol" segment of DC Nation Shorts, voiced by Clancy Brown.
- A female, younger character based on Negative Man named Negative Girl appears in Teen Titans Go!, voiced by Rachel Dratch. This version is Beast Boy's adoptive younger sister who can possess inanimate objects and empower herself by consuming negative energy, and acquired her powers from the Chief to win an arcade game.

==== Live-action ====
- Negative Man appears in the Titans episode "Doom Patrol", portrayed by Dwain Murphy and voiced by Matt Bomer.
  - Additionally, the Doom Patrol incarnation of Negative Man (see below) appears in the episode "Game Over", with Matthew Zuk replacing Murphy.
- Negative Man appears in Doom Patrol, portrayed by Matthew Zuk and voiced again by Matt Bomer, who also portrays the character in flashbacks. This version was a career Air Force pilot, married man, and father of two children who pursued an affair with fellow serviceman John Bowers in the 1960s. Throughout the series, he grapples with accepting his homosexuality and powers. Bomer stated that he was attracted to the role due to Negative Man not falling into gay stereotypes.
  - Negative Man appears in the Arrowverse crossover "Crisis on Infinite Earths" via archive footage of a deleted scene from the first season.

=== Film ===
Negative Man makes a cameo appearance in Justice League: The New Frontier.

=== Video games ===
Negative Man appears as a character summon in Scribblenauts Unmasked: A DC Comics Adventure.
