= Coagula =

DC Comics' first transgender superhero

Publication information
- Publisher: DC Comics
- First appearance: "The Laughing Game"; Doom Patrol, no. 70 (September 1993).
- Created by: Rachel Pollack

In-story information
- Alter ego: Kate Godwin
- Team affiliations: Doom Patrol
- Abilities: Alchemy

Coagula (Kate Godwin) is a character from DC Comics' Doom Patrol series, the first transgender superhero by the publisher. Created by Rachel Pollack as a response to poorly written trans comic characters, the lesbian Coagula obtained her powers—to coagulate and dissolve material—from having sex with Doom Patrol member, Rebis. An actively-written character from September 1993 through February 1995, Coagula cameoed in other comics until her resurrection in 2024.

== Character ==
=== Description ===
Coagula is a transgender lesbian, former prostitute and programmer. After having sex with former Doom Patrol member Rebis ("an alchemical hermaphrodite"), Coagula gained "alchemical powers […] the power to dissolve things on the one hand and coagulate them on the other hand". She tried to join the Justice League, but "it's implied that she was rejected in part for being an out transgender lesbian activist"; she instead joined the Doom Patrol.

=== History ===
Coagula first appears in issue 70—"The Laughing Game"—defeating The Codpiece, a spurned man-turned-villain with a multifunctional, mechanical codpiece. After her introduction in the next few issues, Coagula takes center stage in "The Teiresias Wars", a five-part story combining "Greek mythology with [Pollack's] twisted retelling of the Tower of Babel". The character last featured in "Imagine Ari's Friend (Part Four of Four: A Cry for the Great Face)" Doom Patrol, no. 87 (February 1995). She was abruptly killed off in a flashback, a decision that was controversial among her fans, and an example of the women in refrigerators trope.

In DC Pride 2022, Coagula cameoed in the stories "Super Pride" and "Up at Bat".

In 2024, DC published a 96-page one-shot tribute to Pollack under the DC Pride banner: DC Pride: A Celebration of Rachel Pollack. It was scheduled for Pride Month 2024. Its first story, "Shining Through the Wreckage", depicts Robotman and Will Magnus bringing Coagula back to life. Coagula later appeared as a supporting character in the 2026 DC Pride miniseries Justice League: Dream Girls, serving as a role model for a younger trans superhero, Galaxy.

== Development ==
After creating the trans character Wanda Mann for The Sandman, Neil Gaiman solicited feedback from his friend, Rachel Pollack. She felt Gaiman had poorly written Mann, and said "she would remedy that by putting her own trans character, Coagula, into Doom Patrol"; in 2023, Gaiman admitted he would write Mann differently if creating the comic contemporaneously. Coagula became comics' first transgender superheroine.

Pollack described the Doom Patrol series as being "all about people that had problems with their bodies", outsiders even among the superpowered beings of the DC comics universe. Pollack wanted to add a trans woman to that universe, not as token inclusionism, but in a way that "[h]er transness and experiences informed the story." She based Coagula partly on her own trans experiences, inspired by another trans woman friend—Chelsea Goodwin—simply asking, "Oh, can I be a character? I’ve always wanted to be a character in a comic book." Pollack derived Coagula's real name (Kate Godwin) from activist and theorist Kate Bornstein and Chelsea Goodwin's surname.

The synergy of Coagula's name and powers are derived from the Latin phrase solve et coagula. Pollack wrote Coagula's past to include prostitution and programming because those were the most common professions for trans women in the early-to-mid 1990s.

== Legacy ==
The Coagula character allowed Pollack to expose readers to transgender topics before being killed off, garnering positive feedback from readers who finally saw themselves represented in the pages of comics. Contemporary fans of Coagula wrote letters to DC, with Pollack remembering "including one or two letters from people who quite simply said their lives were saved by this. [That] it kept them from killing themselves, this character."

In 2022, Polygon's Jessica Crets called Coagula "among the deepest portrayals of the trans experience in mainstream superhero comics".

== See also ==
- Lord Fanny – Comic book character
- Nia Nal – Superheroine from the TV series Supergirl, later added to the main DC Comics continuity
