= Henry Watt =

Henry Watt may refer to:

- Harry Watt (politician) (Henry Anderson Watt, 1863–1929), British politician
- Henry J. Watt (1879–1925), student of Oswald Külpe and part of the Würzburg School

== See also ==
- Harry Watt (disambiguation)
- Henry Watts (disambiguation)
