= Salvador Dali's Tarot =

1985 book by Rachel Pollack

Salvador Dali's Tarot is a book by Rachel Pollack published in 1985, with illustrations by Salvador Dalí.

== Contents ==
Salvador Dali's Tarot is a book about the 78 paintings used for Salvador Dalí's deck of Tarot playing cards, published for him in 1984 by the card-printer Naipes Comas of Spain. The book features each painting reproduced in color on its own page.

Dalí began work on them in 1973 after a request from film producer Albert Broccoli for a prop for the James Bond film Live and Let Die. His wife Gala had an interest in the subject and may have encouraged him to undertake it. Broccoli rescinded his offer after Dalí requested an excessive fee; the artist Fergus Hall produced the ones featured in the film. But Dalí continued to work on his version, including his and Gala's faces in the deck, and the former James Bond, Sean Connery, instead of Roger Moore who appeared in that film. In his Surrealist style, many of the Tarot subjects were depicted as well-known classical paintings reimagined and with collage elements.

Pollack had been introduced to Tarot in 1970, and had published Seventy-Eight Degrees of Wisdom, an interpretive guide, in 1980 and 1983.

== Reception ==
Dave Langford reviewed Salvador Dali's Tarot for White Dwarf #71, and stated that "I have no faith in fortune-telling, but the cabalistic symbolism is fascinating ... especially when refracted through the eye of a supremely dotty surrealist."
