= Harry Watt (disambiguation) =

Harry Watt (1906–1987) was a film director.

Harry Watt may also refer to:

- Harry Watt (fashion) Australian dress designer
- Harry Watt (politician) (1863–1929), British politician
- Horrie Watt (1891–1969), also known as Harry, Australian rugby league player
- A Harry Watt drill-bit, a type of mortiser

== See also ==
- Harry Watts (1826–1913), sailor and diver
- Harry Watts (jockey) (1894–1940), Canadian jockey
- Henry Watt (disambiguation)
