= Unquenchable Fire =

1988 novel by Rachel Pollack

- Author: Rachel Pollack
- Language: English
- Genre: Fantasy
- Published: 1988
- Publisher: Overlook Press
- Publication place: United States
- Media type: Print
- Pages: 390
- ISBN: 978-0-87951-447-1
- OCLC: 17322643
- LC Class: PS3566.O4798 U5 1992
- Followed by: Temporary Agency

Unquenchable Fire is a 1988 fantasy novel by Rachel Pollack. It won the 1989 Arthur C. Clarke Award.

== Overview ==
In this surrealistic feminist book, Pollack uses rituals and themes borrowed from different religions to develop her society's mythology.

== Plot ==
In the United States, 87 years after the second Revolution, a bureaucratic Spiritual Development Agency controls and monitors miracles, which are everyday occurrences. Founders sparked a spiritual revolution, overcoming secularists and technophiles to bring about the Living World. Tales of the Founders are told by Picture Tellers, shaman-like celebrities who interpret the Founders' will and are able to transport people into the essence of their myths. Sacrifices and magical rituals are commonplace.

Meanwhile in Poughkeepsie, recently divorced Jennifer Mazdan has an unusual dream and awakes impregnated with a messiah. She is stopped by a strange force when she tries to get an abortion. She tracks her husband through Manhattan, meets a holy ice cream vendor, and gives birth to a daughter. Her immaculate conception disrupts the new order and restores the feminist heroines of the past.

== Reception ==
Unquenchable Fire received mostly positive reviews and won the 1989 Arthur C. Clarke Award. A review in Mythlore found Pollack's depiction of a post-Revolution world to be "prodigiously inventive" and "screamingly funny". John Clute called the book a "complex, though-composed, glinting tale". A review in Black Gate praised the novel's worldbuilding, but was critical of the "almost plotless" story, calling it "an intensely frustrating read". A review in The Gazette called Unquenchable Fire "a work of unparalleled inventiveness, passion, and beauty". Candas Jane Dorsey wrote in the Edmonton Journal that the book "is technological without being technophilic, magical without being muzzy-headed".

== Sequel and related work ==
Pollack published a follow-up to Unquenchable Fire in 1994, Temporary Agency. The sequel was nominated for a Nebula Award for Best Novel.

Inspired by the novel, musician Joe McPhee scored an improvisational, four-movement free jazz work also named "Unquenchable Fire". During the premier of the piece at the Out of Doors festival in 1997, Pollack read several passages from her book. The piece was performed by McPhee and his quartet as well as Pauline Oliveros's Deep Listening Band.

== External ==
- Unquenchable Fire at the Library of Congress
- Unquenchable Fire at LibraryThing
- Unquenchable Fire at Goodreads
