= Rachel Pollack =

American writer (1945–2023)

- Born: August 17, 1945; New York City, U.S.
- Died: April 7, 2023 (aged 77); Rhinebeck, New York, U.S.
- Education: New York University; Claremont Graduate University
- Occupation: Author
- Notable work: Unquenchable Fire; Doom Patrol (issues 64–87)
- Style: Magical realism
- Spouse(s): Edith Katz (m. pre 1971-1990s) Zoe Matoff (m. 2022)

Rachel Grace Pollack (August 17, 1945 – April 7, 2023) was an American science fiction author, comic book writer, and expert on divinatory tarot.

== Early life and education ==
Pollack was born on August 17, 1945, in Brooklyn, New York to an Orthodox Jewish family. At age 15, she was diagnosed with cancer, which was later found out to be calcium deposits, with her seeing it as a miracle influenced by her parents' prayers. She earned an honours degree in English from New York University and a master's in English from Claremont Graduate University. After getting her master's, Pollack secured a teaching job at the State University of New York at Plattsburgh and married a woman named Edith Katz (the marriage ended by the 1990s ). 1971 was a pivotal year for Pollack, who in the same year sold her first short story ("Pandora's Box"), discovered Tarot and came out as a trans woman.

== Career ==
=== Feminism and trans activism ===
After Rachel's coming out, the couple moved to London, where they became active in radical lesbian feminist scene. Pollack was instrumental in founding the transgender wing of the UK Gay Liberation Front, who in 1972 published the trans manifesto titled “Don’t Call Me Mister You Fucking Beast,” written by Pollack, Roz Kaveney and others. Kaveney described Rachel as "a crystallising force in the trans movement" and "perpetually an inspirational figure." In the same year Rachel and Edith experienced "sudden" rejection from their lesbian feminist peers, whose “political ideology had shifted” to a transphobic one, causing the couple to move to Amsterdam.

Pollack's later work on spirituality continued to be influenced by women’s spirituality movement and second-wave feminism. Pollack's essays on spirituality also often had a transfeminist angle, such as in her essay Aphrodite: Transexual Goddess of Passion (1995), in which she describes Aphrodite as a trans figure. In TransSisters Issue 1 she elaborates: "Aphrodite is the transformation of the male sky God. Her femaleness comes out of this maleness, and comes out of the removal of the male genitals."

In the 1990s, Pollack helped lead a conference focused on post-op trans women's experiences, named the New Woman Conference (later renamed as the Rite of Passage conference due to controversies around the name). She became a regular contributor to TransSisters, the Journal of Transsexual Feminism.

Pollack also created the first mainstream transgender superhero, Kate Godwin, in DC's Doom Patrol series.

=== Tarot reading ===
In 1980 Pollack published 78 Degrees of Wisdom, a book on Tarot card reading that has been commonly referenced by Tarot readers. Pollack wrote the 1985 book Salvador Dali's Tarot, an exposition of Salvador Dalí's Tarot deck, comprising a full-page color plate for each card, with her commentary on the facing page. She created her own Tarot deck, Shining Woman Tarot (later Shining Tribe Tarot). She also aided in the creation of the 1995 Vertigo Tarot Deck with illustrator Dave McKean and author Neil Gaiman, and she wrote a book to accompany it. Gaiman sometimes consulted Pollack on the tarot for his stories.

=== Comics ===
Pollack wrote for the comic book Doom Patrol, on DC Comics' Vertigo imprint, from 1993 to 1995. Her run of issues (64–87) was a continuation of a 1960s comic which had recently become a cult favorite under Grant Morrison. Pollack took over the series in 1993 after meeting editor Tom Peyer at a party, telling him it was the only monthly comic book she would want to write at the time, and sending him a sample script. Towards the end of Morrison's run, Pollack began writing monthly "letters to the editor" in what she describes as a "gee-whiz fangirl" voice asking to take over the book when Morrison was finished. In the final letter, she claims that she had already told her mother that she had been given the job. Peyer then used that response to that letter to officially announce that Pollack was, in fact, taking over the book.

During her tenure, Pollack dealt with such rarely addressed comic book topics as menstruation, sexual identity, and transgender issues. This included writing the first mainstream transgender superhero, Kate Godwin (Coagula). Her run ended two years later, with the book's cancellation.

In addition to Doom Patrol, Pollack wrote issues of the Vertigo Visions anthology featuring Brother Power the Geek (1993) and Tomahawk (1998), the first 11 issues of the fourth volume of New Gods (1995), and the five-issue limited series Time Breakers (1996) for the short lived Helix imprint.

In 2019, it was announced that Pollack was reuniting with Doom Patrol artist Richard Case and letterer John Workman to create a short story—titled "Snake Song"—for the Kickstarter funded "music-themed horror anthology" Dead Beats.

In 2024, DC Comics published "DC Pride: A Celebration of Rachel Pollack" reprinting issue 70 of "Doom Patrol" and issue 1 of "Vertigo Visions: The Geek #1 'Homelands of the Dolls'" as well as an introductory tribute by Stuart Moore and a new story, "Shining Through the Wreckage" revisiting Pollack's Doom Patrol character Coagula written by Joe Corallo.

=== Fiction ===
Three of Pollack's novels won or were nominated for major awards in the science fiction and fantasy field: Unquenchable Fire won the 1989 Arthur C. Clarke Award; Godmother Night won the 1997 World Fantasy Award, was shortlisted for the James Tiptree Jr. Award, and was nominated for a Lambda Literary Award for Transgender Literature; while Temporary Agency was nominated for the 1995 Nebula Award and the Mythopoeic Award, and shortlisted for the Tiptree.

Her magical realism novels explore worlds imbued with elements pulled from a number of traditions, faiths, and religions. Several of her novels are set in an alternative reality that resembles modern America, but an America of Bright Beings, where magic and ritual, religion and thaumaturgy are the norms.

Her short work "Burning Beard: The Dreams and Visions of Joseph ben Jacob, Lord Viceroy of Egypt" was published in 2007 in the anthology Interfictions: An Anthology of Interstitial Writing, edited by Theodora Goss and Delia Sherman. It was reprinted online in Lightspeed in May 2014.

=== Nonfiction ===
Pollack's book The Body of the Goddess is an exploration of the history of the Goddess and her relation to locality and landscape. Pollack uses the image of the Goddess in many of her works.

=== Teaching ===
For 32 years, Pollack taught seminars with tarot author Mary K. Greer at the Omega Institute for Holistic Studies, in Rhinebeck, New York. She also did seminars for several years in California in conjunction with Greer, and she co-presented a breakthrough seminar with author Johanna Gargiulo-Sherman on tarot and psychic ability, using her own Shining Tribe Tarot and Gargiulo-Sherman's Sacred Rose Tarot. Pollack was also a popular lecturer at tarot seminars and symposiums such as Los Angeles Tarot Symposium, Bay Area Tarot Symposium, and the Readers Studio.

She was a professor of creative writing in the Masters of Fine Arts program of Goddard College. She taught English at State University of New York.

== Influences ==
Pollack was Jewish, and frequently wrote about the Kabbalah, most notably in The Kabbalah Tree.

She was a trans woman and wrote frequently on transgender issues. In Doom Patrol she introduced Coagula, a trans lesbian character. She also wrote several essays on transness, attacking the notion that it is a "sickness", instead saying that it is a passion. She emphasized the revelatory aspects of transness, saying that "the trance-sexual [sic] woman sacrifices her social identity as a male, her personal history, and finally the very shape of her body to a knowledge, a desire, which overpowers all rational understanding and proof."

A Secret Woman features a police detective who is transgender and Jewish. The detective utters the prayer, "Blessed art thou oh G-d who made me not a woman. Double blessed is Doctor Green who has." Pollack created the characters known as 'the bandage people' for her Doom Patrol run. The bandage people are 'sexually remaindered spirits' who died in sexual accidents. The initials SRS came from the medical term 'sex reassignment surgery'. Pollack's essay "The Transsexual Book of The Dead: Osiris and the Trance Man", written for the anthology Phallus Palace, addresses the Osiris myth and "reconfigures Egyptian mythology into a multi-layered map for transsexual experience."

Fairy tales such as the Brothers Grimm influenced many of Pollack's writings. Her book Tarot of Perfection is a book of fairy tales based on the tarot.

== Personal life ==
In 1971 Pollack moved to London, however only stayed there for 6 months. Pollack and Katz returned to the US for three months after coming out to their families. When they returned to the UK they found their community had turned hostile to trans people, and moved to Amsterdam in 1972. Pollack lived in Amsterdam for up to a decade, where she completed the majority of her medical transition. She later moved back to the US

In July 2022, Pollack revealed via Facebook that, after seemingly overcoming Hodgkin lymphoma several years earlier, she had been diagnosed with a different variant of lymphoma and would be undergoing chemotherapy. In August, Pollack's wife Zoe Matoff and Patricia Nolan announced that Pollack was in an intensive care unit and started a GoFundMe fundraiser for her medical expenses. Those who shared the fundraiser on Twitter included Neil Gaiman, Shelly Bond, Gail Simone, and DC Comics editors Chris Conroy and Andrea Shay, while prominent donors included Rachel Gold, Al Ewing, Kieron Gillen, Kim Newman, Brett Booth, and Cliff Chiang, ultimately raising over $28,000 against a $15,000 goal by September.

On March 12, 2023, Gaiman announced on Instagram and Mastodon, at the behest of Pollack's wife, that Pollack was in hospice care and nearing the end of her life. This led some outlets to mistakenly report that Pollack had already died.

Pollack died from Hodgkin lymphoma on April 7, 2023, at the age of 77.

== Awards and memberships ==
- 1997 World Fantasy Award for Best Novel winner for Godmother Night
- 1994 Nebula Award for Best Novel nominee for Temporary Agency
- 1989 Arthur C. Clarke Award winner for Unquenchable Fire
- Certified Tarot Grand Master (CTGM) with the Tarot Certification Board of America
- Tarot Sage (TS) with the American Board For Tarot Certification
- member of the American Tarot Association (ATA)
- member of the International Tarot Society (ITS)
- member of the Tarot Guild of Australia
- member of the Tarot Association of the British Isles.
- member of the Tarosophy Tarot Association

== Published works ==
=== Non-fiction books ===
- Anderson, Hilary (1989). New Thoughts on Tarot. North Hollywood: Newcastle Pub. Co. ISBN 0-87877-139-5.
- Hillman, James (1997). Marriages: Spring 60, a Journal of Archetype and Culture. City: Continuum International Publishing Group. ISBN 1-882670-09-4.
- Livernois, Jay (1996). Archetypal Sex: Spring : a Journal of Archetype and Culture. Irving: Spring Publications. ISBN 1-882670-05-1.
- Mckean, Dave (2001). Bento. Pacific Grove: Allen Spiegel Fine Arts. ISBN 0-9642069-4-3.
- Pollack, Rachel (1985). Salvador Dali's Tarot. Salem, New Hampshire: Salem House. ISBN 0-88162-076-9.
- Pollack, Rachel (1986). Tarot. Wellingborough: Aquarian Press. ISBN 0-85030-465-2.
- Pollack, Rachel (1986). Teach Yourself Fortune Telling. New York: Henry Holt & Company. ISBN 0-8050-0125-5.
- Pollack, Rachel (1990). The Haindl Tarot. City: Newcastle Publishing Company. ISBN 0-87877-156-5.
- Pollack, Rachel (1990). The Haindl Tarot: the Major Arcana. City: Newcastle Publishing Company. ISBN 0-87877-155-7.
- Pollack, Rachel (1990). The New Tarot. City: Overlook Hardcover. ISBN 0-87951-395-0.
- Pollack, Rachel (1991). Tarot Readings and Meditations. London: Thorsons Pub. ISBN 1-85538-049-8.
- Pollack, Rachel (1992) Shining Woman Tarot. U.S. Games Systems. ISBN 978-1-85538-098-1
- Pollack, Rachel (1995). The Journey out. New York: Viking. ISBN 0-14-037254-7.
- Pollack, Rachel (1997). The Body of the Goddess. Tisbury: Element Books. ISBN 1-85230-871-0.
- Pollack, Rachel (1998). Seventy-Eight Degrees of Wisdom. New York: Thorsons Publishers. ISBN 0-7225-3572-4.
- Pollack, Rachel (2000). The Power of Ritual. New York: Dell. ISBN 0-440-50872-X.
- Pollack, Rachel (2001). The Shining Tribe Tarot. Saint Paul: Llewellyn Publications. ISBN 1-56718-514-2.
- Pollack, Rachel (2001). The Shining Tribe Tarot, Revised and Expanded. Saint Paul: Llewellyn Publications. ISBN 1-56718-532-0.
- Pollack, Rachel (2002). Complete Illustrated Guide to Tarot. City: Element Books Ltd. ISBN 0-00-713115-1.
- Pollack, Rachel (2002). The Forest Of Souls: A Walk Through The Tarot. Saint Paul, Minnesota: Llewellyn Publications. ISBN 1567185339.
- Pollack, Rachel (2004). The Kabbalah Tree. Saint Paul: Llewellyn Publications. ISBN 0-7387-0507-1.
- Pollack, Rachel (2005). Seeker. Saint Paul: Llewellyn Publications. ISBN 0-7387-0521-7.
- Robbins, Trina (2002). Eternally Bad. City: Book Sales. ISBN 0-7858-1565-1.
- Pollack, Rachel (2008). Tarot Wisdom. Saint Paul: Llewellyn Publications. ISBN 978-0-73871-309-0.
- Pollack, Rachel (2026). Trans Central Station. London: Spiral House. ISBN 978-1-0682409-9-7

=== Novels ===
- Pollack, Rachel (1980). Golden Vanity.
- Pollack, Rachel (1987). Alqua Dreams. New York: F. Watts. ISBN 0-531-15070-4.
- Pollack, Rachel (1988). Unquenchable Fire, illustrated by Wayne Anderson in 1989.
- Pollack, Rachel (1994). Temporary Agency. City: St. Martin's Press. ISBN 0-312-11077-4.
- Pollack, Rachel (1996). Godmother Night. New York: St. Martin's Press. ISBN 0-312-14606-X.
- Pollack, Rachel (2002). A Secret Woman. New York: St. Martin's Minotaur. ISBN 0-312-24659-5.
- Pollack, Rachel (2015). The Child Eater. London: Jo Fletcher Books. ISBN 978-1-623-65460-3.
- Pollack, Rachel (2017). The Fissure King: A Novel in Five Stories. Underland Press.

=== Collections ===
- Pollack, Rachel (1998). Burning Sky. Cambrian Publications. ISBN 1-878914-04-9.
- Pollack, Rachel (2008). The Tarot of Perfection: A Book of Tarot Tales. New York: Magic Realist Press. ISBN 978-1-905572-09-0.
- Pollack, Rachel (2019). The Beatrix Gates: plus The woman who didn't come back, plus Trans central station, and much more. Oakland: PM Press. ISBN 978-1-62963-578-1.

=== Anthologies ===
- Pollack, Rachel; Caitlin Matthews (1996). Tarot Tales. New York: Ace Books. ISBN 0-441-00352-4.

=== Short fiction ===
- Pollack, Rachel (1971). Pandora's Bust.
- Pollack, Rachel (1973). Tubs of Slaw.
- Pollack, Rachel (1975). Black Rose and White Rose.
- Pollack, Rachel (1976). Is Your Child Using Drugs? Seven Ways to Recognize a Drug Addict.
- Pollack, Rachel (1982). Angel Baby.
- Pollack, Rachel (1984). The Malignant One.
- Pollack, Rachel (1984). The Girl Who Went to the Rich Neighbourhood.
- Pollack, Rachel (1984). Tree House.
- Pollack, Rachel (1984). Lands of Stone.
- Pollack, Rachel (1986). The Protector.
- Pollack, Rachel (1989). The Bead Woman.
- Pollack, Rachel (1989). Knower of Birds.
- Pollack, Rachel (1989). Burning Sky.
- Pollack, Rachel (1990). The Woman Who Didn't Come Back.
- Pollack, Rachel (1990). General All-Purpose Fairy Tale.
- Pollack, Rachel; James Patrick Kelly; Pat Cadigan; Nancy Kress (1997). Making Good Time.
- Pollack, Rachel (1998). The Fool, the Stick, and the Princess.
- Pollack, Rachel (2001). The Younger Brother.
- Pollack, Rachel (2003). Delusions of Universal Grandeur.
- Pollack, Rachel; Michael Cisco; Jeffrey Thomas; Eric G. Schaller; K. J. Bishop; Stepan Chapman; Richard Calder; R. F. Wexler (2003). Reminiscences.
- Pollack, Rachel (2008). Immortal Snake.
- Pollack, Rachel (May 2010). "Forever". The Magazine of Fantasy and Science Fiction.

=== Poetry ===
- The Wild Cows (1993)
- Fortune's Lover (May 2009). A Midsummer Night's Press
- Tyrant Oedipus (2012), with David Vine. EyeCorner Press

=== Essays ===
- "Introduction: A Machine for Constructing Stories" (1989)
- Read This (The New York Review of Science Fiction, October 1991) (1991)
- Read This (The New York Review of Science Fiction, July 1995) (1995)
- Read This (The New York Review of Science Fiction, August 1996) (1996)
- Pollack, Rachel. "Death and Its Afterlives In the Tarot". Parabola.

=== Reviews ===
- The Book of Embraces (1991) by Eduardo Galeano
- Outside the Dog Museum (1992) by Jonathan Carroll
- Coelestis [vt Celestis] (1996) by Paul Park

=== Comics ===
- Rachel Pollack (w). Doom Patrol, no. 64–87 (1993–1995). Vertigo.
- Rachel Pollack, Tom Peyer (w), Luke Ross (p), Brian Garvey (i). New Gods, vol. 4, no. 1–11 (1995–1996). DC Comics.
- Rachel Pollack (w), Chris Weston (a). Time Breakers, no. 1–5 (1995). Helix.
- Rachel Pollack (w), Thomas Yeates (a). Vertigo Visions: Tomahawk, no. 1 (1998). Vertigo.
- Rachel Pollack (w), Mike Allred (a). The Geek one-shot (1993). Vertigo.
