= Watts De Peyster Fireman's Hall =

- U.S. National Register of Historic Places
- U.S. National Historic Landmark District – Contributing property
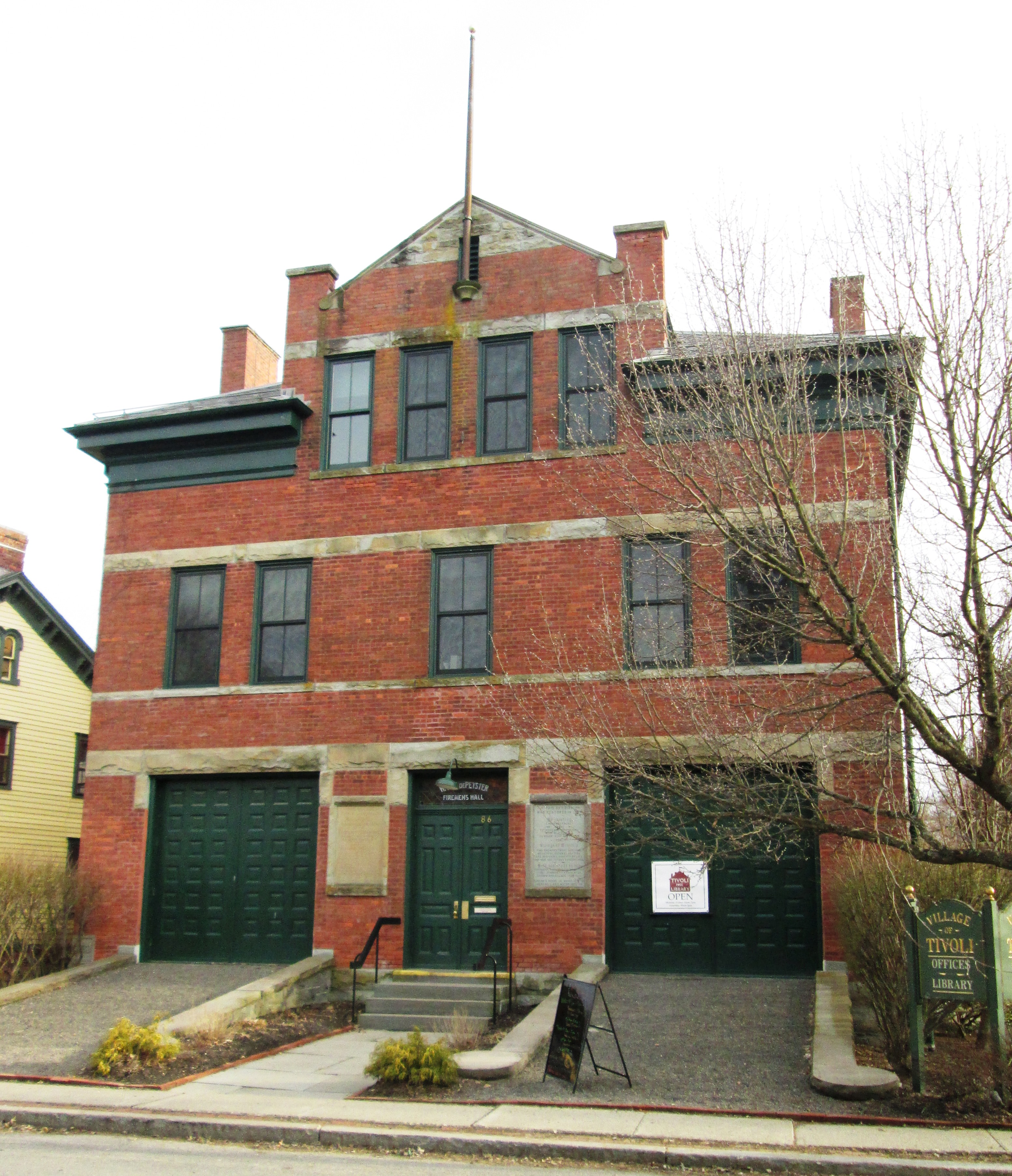
- North (front) facade, 2019

- Location within New York Location within the United States
- Interactive map showing the location of Peyster’s Fireman Hall
- Location: Tivoli, NY
- Nearest city: Kingston
- Coordinates: 42°03′32″N 73°54′41″W
- Built: 1898
- Architect: Michael O'Connor
- Architectural style: Richardsonian Romanesque
- NRHP reference No.: 89002005
- Added to NRHP: November 16, 1989

The Watts De Peyster Fireman's Hall is located on Broadway in the village of Tivoli, New York. John Watts De Peyster, a resident, paid for it and gave it to the village for its fire department in 1898. It is a brick "storefront" firehouse, a type of fire station more commonly seen in cities at the time than small rural villages like Tivoli.

Since the construction of a new firehouse in 1986 it has been the village hall. In 1989 it was listed on the National Register of Historic Places, and three years later it also became a contributing property to the Hudson River Historic District, a National Historic Landmark.

== History ==
Tivoli was incorporated as a village of the Town of Red Hook in 1872, after a period of tremendous growth due to commerce along the Hudson River. Two smaller existing settlements, Upper Red Hook Landing and Madalin, were combined in the new municipality.

As soon as the village came into existence, its government discussed the need for a new firehouse to serve the community. These discussions continued for a quarter-century, during which its commercial importance began to decline. In 1896 the Village Board passed legislation creating a fire department and calling a special election to decide how it would be financed. Two years later John Watts De Peyster, a wealthy resident of the area and village president as well as an influential authority on firefighting, saved the village the trouble by hiring local architect Michael O'Connor to design a new firehouse. Once it was built, he leased it to the village.

In 1900, during a tax dispute with the village, he barred the board from meeting there. He had also threatened to close the firehouse if his estranged son, who had been elected village president, was allowed in the building. Seven years later, upon his death, the lease passed to a local orphanage he had founded. That arrangement lasted until 1921, when his descendants bought the lease from the orphanage and donated the building to the village.

Since 1986, when a new firehouse was built, the building has been the location of the Tivoli Village Offices and Tivoli Free Library, as well as the Tivoli Bays Visitor Center of the Hudson River National Estuarine Research Reserve.

The Watts de Peyster Fireman's Hall was restored and renovated in 1994.

== Building ==
The firehouse is a three-story building, three bays wide by four deep, on a half-acre (2,000 m^{2}) lot in downtown Tivoli. It is faced in brick laid in English bond with contrasting stone courses at the floor levels. The hipped slate roof is pierced by a dormer with gabled parapet top, four chimneys and a round turreted tower rising from the southwest corner. The roofline's cornice is broken in front by the dormer.

On the northern (front) facade, the first floor has two former garage openings, now filled with paneled wooden doors, and a regular entrance between them. The course above them consists of stone blocks with oak leaves, a traditional European symbol in heraldry for firefighters. A cornerstone gives the architect, builder and date of construction, and a marble dedication plaque memorializes Watts and de Peyster. The stone basement is visible along the side and rear elevations.

Inside, the first floor is divided into the two large bays used originally for fire engines, with plaster walls, wainscoting, pressed tin ceilings and wooden-plank floors. The second floor, used originally as meeting rooms, has similar finishing as well as thin cast iron columns in its largest room. All rooms have their original carved mantel and fireplace cover. The third floor is a single large room with three large wood braces supporting the ceiling.

There is one outbuilding, a garage built during the mid-20th century. It is not considered a contributing property.

== Tivoli Bays Visitor Center of the Hudson River National Estuarine Research Reserve (HRNERR) ==
Tivoli Bays is one of four coastal wetlands that comprise the Hudson River Reserve (HR), in the National Estuarine Research Reserve System (NERR). The HRNERR Tivoli Bays Visitor Center and Doorway to the Bays exhibit for the Tivoli Bays unit of the HRNERR are housed in Watts de Peyster Fireman's Hall. The Visitor Center and exhibit are depicted as "i" (Information) located on Kidd Lane on the map of the Tivoli Bays unit of the HRNERR. A nature trail leading to a canoe launch begins behind the building.
