= John Watts de Peyster =

American author (1821-1907)

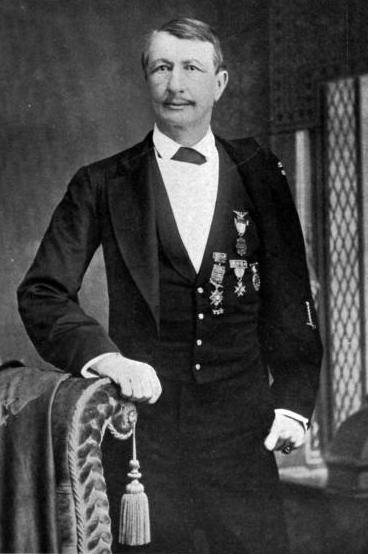
- Born: March 9, 1821; New York, New York, U.S.
- Died: May 4, 1907 (aged 86); New York, New York, U.S.
- Spouse: Estelle Livingston
- Children: John Watts de Peyster, Jr. (son)
- Military career
- Allegiance: United States
- Branch: New York State Militia
- Service years: 1845–1866
- Rank: Brevet Major-General
- Conflicts: Mexican–American War; American Civil War
- Other work: Historian, lawyer, writer

John Watts de Peyster, Sr. (March 9, 1821 – May 4, 1907) was an American author on the art of war, philanthropist, and the Adjutant General of New York. He served in the New York State Militia during the Mexican–American War.

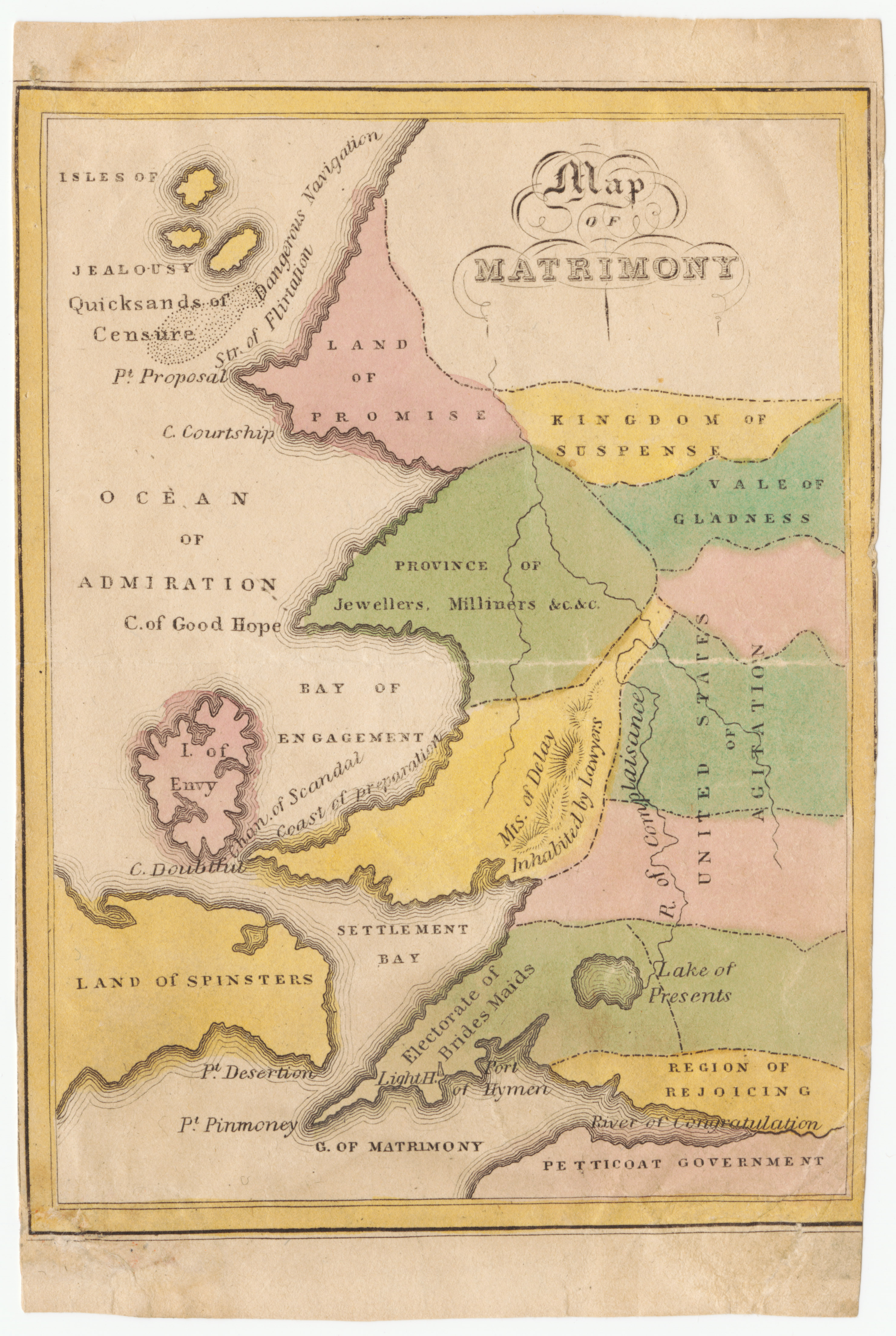

== Early life and background ==
De Peyster was born in Manhattan into a wealthy old New York City Huguenot family, and was a descendant of Johannes de Peyster Sr. His father was Frederic de Peyster, a wealthy New York City lawyer, investor, and philanthropist. He was a first cousin of Maj. Gen. Philip Kearny. His great great grandfather was Abraham de Peyster, an early Mayor of New York City, whose brother was Johannes de Peyster, also Mayor. His grandfather was a nephew of Arent DePeyster.

He studied law at Columbia University, although he did not graduate on account of his poor health. He had become an invalid at a young age due to a heart affliction he developed during service as a volunteer fireman. De Peyster was heavily involved as a volunteer firefighter with the No. 5 Hose Carriage during his collegiate years, including a major fire in 1836, leading to his health problems. Despite these physical difficulties, he was described by some as feisty, and even dictatorial.

He later received the honorary degrees of M.A. from Columbia College, LL.D. from Nebraska College, and Ph.D. from Franklin & Marshall College. He was one of the organizers of the New York City Police Department and Fire Department. Reforms he advocated through publications which were eventually implemented nationwide included a paid Fire Department, and Steam Fire Engines, and New York City was the first in the nation to adopt such measures.

He spent his entire career in the New York State Militia, being promoted to brigadier general in 1851. He served as state Judge Advocate General and eventually Adjutant General, before resigning over a conflict with Governor Myron Clark in 1855. He traveled through Europe extensively as a military observer, and implemented many reforms that modernized the militia for the upcoming conflict.

== American Civil War ==
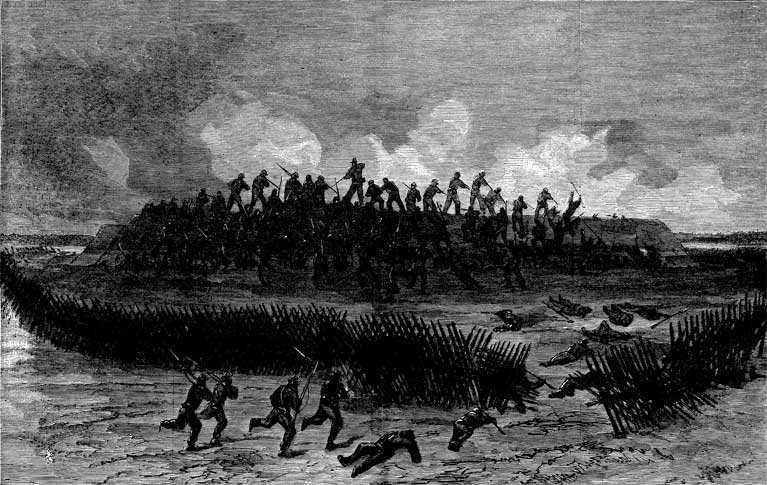
October 27, 1864—Armed with Spencer repeating rifles, men of Company K, 148th Pennsylvania Volunteers, advance in skirmish line and capture a fort garrisoned by the 46th Virginia Infantry during the Siege of Petersburg, Virginia.

Already a brigadier general of the state militia at the onset of the Civil War, he met with what he perceived (and declared) to be prejudiced resistance from Abraham Lincoln when he attempted to raise regiments for the Union Army. In 1861, de Peyster traveled to Washington, D.C., to solicit a commission as a brigadier general of the Regular Army and offered to raise two regiments of artillery, which he felt best suited his expertise and physical condition. He was met with little interest after New York had already filled its national recruitment quota of 75,000 men.

Each of his three sons served in the conflict in the Union Army. The eldest, John Watts de Peyster Jr., performed duty as an aide-de-camp and artillery commander with the Army of the Potomac and mustered out as a brevet brigadier general; Frederic de Peyster III, was a colonel and surgeon; while the youngest, Johnston de Peyster, was a second lieutenant in charge of a battery of artillery credited with hoisting the first Union flag over the Confederate capitol of Richmond, Virginia, after its fall.

The career militia officer had always suffered from poor health, and turned down a commission as a colonel of cavalry offered to him by New York Senator Ira Harris in June 1863 on behalf of Generals Joseph Hooker and Alfred Pleasonton, who may have had an eye towards de Peyster's social connections. Other notable figures with limited field experience who were promoted to brigadier general by Pleasonton at that time were Elon J. Farnsworth, son of a Congressman, Wesley Merritt, and George Armstrong Custer.

His treatise New American Tactics was a series of articles published in The Army and Navy Journal that advocated making the skirmish line the new line of battle, which was considered revolutionary at the time. These contributions were translated and copied into foreign military journals, including Correard's renowned Biographie des célébrités militaires des armées de terre et de mer. Such tactics were put into practice by generals including John Buford and were later adopted worldwide. He was appointed a brevet major general in the New York Militia, April 9, 1866, by a special act of the state legislature. His elevation to major general was the first such honor bestowed by the State of New York, or any other State in the Union.

He was a close friend of Maj. Gen. Daniel Sickles, commander of the Union III Corps. General de Peyster wrote biographies of III Corps Generals Andrew A. Humphreys and Gershom Mott during the war, and wrote highly of Buford's celebrated usage of light cavalry.

After the Civil War, de Peyster was elected as a 3rd Class Companion of the Military Order of the Loyal Legion of the United States in recognition of his efforts to support the Union during the war.

The hero at Oak Ridge was John Buford ... he not only showed the rarest tenacity, but his personal capacity made his cavalry accomplish marvels, and rival infantry in their steadfastness ... Glorious John Buford!

— Gen. de Payster on Buford's Dragoon Tactics

== Postwar career ==
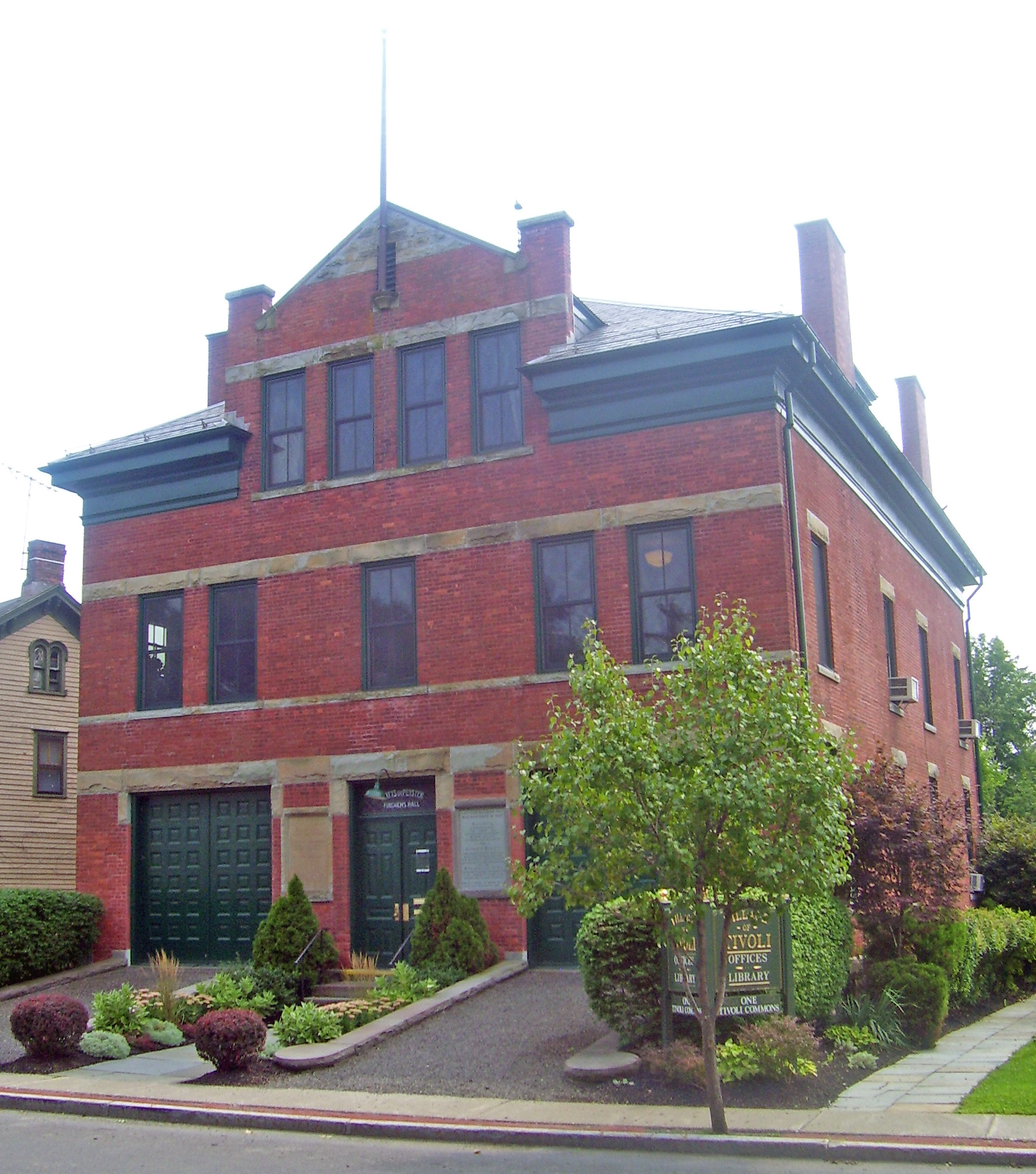
The Tivoli firehouse, today the village hall

General de Peyster was known as the largest developer in the village of Tivoli, New York, where he resided at his family home. In 1892 he replaced a wooden Methodist church with a brick structure that stands today. He also refurbished an old school into an industrial school for girls. An authority on fire fighting, in 1895 de Peyster erected a huge state-of-the-art brick building for the local department. A portrait of him resides there in present day, and it was used as a firehouse until 1986. The high Victorian structure also contained a courtroom, a jail and a large meeting room for the local government. The General eventually had a conflict with the village Mayor (his own son, Johnston de Peyster), and de Peyster barred him from entering the building. The village government was forced to move to another building and remained there until the Firehouse was restored in 1994, returning the local government to de Peyster's building.

His writing strongly advocated Dan Sickles and his role at the Battle of Gettysburg. Some of his works including detailing Maj. Gen. Joseph Hooker's influences on the Army of the Potomac leading up to the battle, both positive and negative. He also issued a damning portrayal of the performance of the Union XI Corps at the Battle of Chancellorsville. His writing also spoke of the brilliant accomplishments of Maj. Gen. George H. Thomas and led to his modern consideration as one of the finest commanders of the war. In the New York Times and scholarly journals, he correctly predicted the Franco-Austrian War in 1866 and the Franco-Prussian War of 1870. He made significant contributions to historical journal publications under the pseudonym "Anchor" which extolled the services of Sickles and Buford, and in separate publications praised the men of the New York City Fire Department.

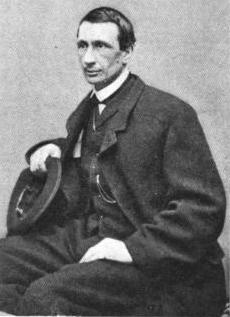
General de Peyster in 1863

De Peyster wrote extensive military histories about the Battle of Saratoga and in 1887 donated a memorial called the Boot Monument, which commemorates Benedict Arnold's heroic wounding at the battle (although Arnold is not mentioned by name and the memorial only depicts his boot). In 1905, De Peyster purchased first baronial mansion of Sir William Johnson, known since 1755 as Fort Johnson, and donated it to the Montgomery County Historical Society, of Amsterdam, New York.

In 1901, he donated several thousand books and maps to the Smithsonian Institution, along with a Moorish Yataghan he collected on his travels in 1851. De Peyster's biographer devotes six chapters to his benefactions, but does not mention his ethnological collections. Another philanthropic contribution included building the first library at Franklin & Marshall College, and donating one of the largest and most distinct rare book collections about European military history, the 1,890 volume Watts de Peyster: Napoleon Buonaparte. He collected many of the monographs while traveling in Europe conducting research for his own biography of Napoleon, entitled Napoleone di Buonaparte (1896). The monument to Abraham de Peyster, a founder of New Amsterdam, sculpted by George Edwin Bissell, was commissioned by General de Peyster in Bowling Green, the old town square of New York City. John Watts de Peyster was also a Vice President of the American Numismatic Society, and the namesake of Post #71 of the New York G.A.R. in Tivoli, New York.

He was the author of Life of Field Marshal Torstenson (1855), The Dutch at the North Pole (1857), Caurausius, the Dutch Augustus (1858), Life of Baron Cohorn (1860), The Decisive Conflicts of the Late Civil War, or Slaveholder's Rebellion (1867), Personal and Military History of General Philip Kearny (1869), The Life and Misfortunes and the Military Career of Brig.-Gen. Sir John Johnson (1882), and Gypsies: Some Curious Investigations, Collected, Translated, Or Reprinted from Various Sources (1887), and contributor to numerous other books, biographies, publications, and articles.

== Personal life ==
John Watts de Peyster was descended from Hubertus "Gilbert" Livingston (1690–1746) and Cornelia Beekman (1693–1742), granddaughter of Wilhelmus Beekman. He married Estelle Livingston (1819–1898). They were the parents of:

- John Watts de Peyster Jr. (1841–1873), an aide-de-camp and artillery commander with the Army of the Potomac,
- Frederic de Peyster III (1842–1874), a colonel and surgeon,
- Johnston Livingston de Peyster (1846–1903), a second lieutenant in charge of a battery of artillery credited with hoisting the first Union flag over the Confederate capitol of Richmond, Virginia, after its fall.

De Peyster died in 1907 of natural causes at a family residence in Manhattan. He willed his Tivoli manor Rose Hill to a local Children's Home.

== Notes ==
Preceded by Isaac Vanderpoel	Adjutant General; New York National Guard; 1855	Succeeded by Robert H. Pruyn
