= John Watts de Peyster Jr. =

- Born: December 2, 1841; New York City, US
- Died: April 12, 1873 (aged 31); New York City, US
- Military career
- Allegiance: United States of America
- Service years: 1862–1864
- Rank: Brevet brigadier general (New York Militia); Colonel (Union Army)
- Conflicts: American Civil War; Battle of Williamsburg; Battle of Fredericksburg; Battle of Chancellorsville

John Watts De Peyster Jr. (December 2, 1841 – April 12, 1873) was a Union Army officer during the American Civil War and a member of the famous de Peyster family of New York. His father was Brevet Major General John Watts De Peyster of the New York Militia.

== Biography ==
John Watts De Peyster Jr. was born in New York City. In March 1862, while attending the Columbia Law School, he decided to join the staff of his father's first cousin, Union Army Major General Philip Kearny as volunteer aide. After Kearny's death at the Battle of Chantilly, he then joined the 11th New York Cavalry Regiment in June 1862 as a lieutenant, but was mustered out the same month, and assigned to the 1st New York Light Artillery as a major and served until 1863 when he joined the staff of General John J. Peck.

He was then stricken by a severe illness of several months and was unable to return to the field until late 1863. For actions in the Chancellorsville campaign and in the Battle of Fredericksburg, he was promoted to colonel. He remained with the army until the summer of 1864, when his increasing weakness compelled him to resign. He later received a brevet promotion to brigadier general of the New York Militia in 1865. His brothers Frederic and Johnston de Peyster also served in the war.

He died on April 12, 1873, in New York City.
