= Daniel Watts =

Daniel Watts may refer to:

- Daniel J. Watts (born 1982), American actor
- Danny Watts (born 1979), British racing driver
- Danny Watts Jr. (born 1961), American stock car racing driver
- Daniel Watts, mixed martial artist opponent of Dustin Poirier
