= Henry Watts (botanist) =

Australian amateur collector of Algae specimens and botanist

Henry Watts (1828–1889) was an Australian amateur collector of Algae specimens. He is considered "the pioneer of freshwater phycology in Victoria".

Very little biographical information on him has been published. At various times between 1871 and 1889 his occupation was listed as "bootmaker", "perfume manufacturer" and "preparer of microscopical objects". In his later life he served as librarian, vice-president and committee member of the Field Naturalists Club of Victoria. He spent the final year of his life in the Yarra Bend Lunatic Asylum, suffering from dementia and paralysis, apparently without any family or close friends.

His scientific legacy consists of significant phytological collections, and several published papers. Watts collected marine and freshwater algae from around Warrnambool, and later collected freshwater algae from Ballarat and the Yarra River basin. The marine algae specimens were sent to William Henry Harvey, and the freshwater algae to Ferdinand von Mueller, who passed them on to Friedrich Kutzing and C. F. Otto for identification. His published papers are as follows:

- Watts, H. (1865). "On the freshwater algae of Victoria". Transactions and Proceedings of the Royal Society of Victoria. 6: 67–68.
- Watts, H. (1883). "A trip to Mt. Macedon in search of freshwater algae". Southern Science Record. 3: 252–253.
- Watts, H. (1884). "On a species of freshwater algae from near Berwick". Victorian Naturalist. 1: 21.
- Watts, H. (1886). "Pond life around Oakleigh". Victorian Naturalist. 3: 80.
- Watts, H. (1887). "Some recent additions to our knowledge of microscopic natural history". Victorian Naturalist. 3: 133–137.

Despite his modest scientific output, it has been argued that "Watts should be remembered as the pioneer of freshwater phycology in Victoria", primarily because he was collecting freshwater algae at a time when very few others were doing so, other than incidentally.
