= The Quest =

The Quest may refer to:

== Film ==
- The Quest (1915 film), an American silent film written by F. McGrew Willis
- The Quest (1958 film), a Canadian short drama film
- The Quest (1986 film), an Australian fantasy film
- The Quest (1996 film), a martial-arts film

== Publications ==
- The Quest (Dutch: De kleine Johannes, lit. 'Little Johannes'), an 1887 novel by Frederik van Eeden
- The Quest, and Other Poems, a 1904 collection by Edward Salisbury Field
- The Quest, a 1906 collection by James Cousins
- The Quest: A Romance, a 1909 novel by Justus Miles Forman
- The Quest, a 1916 novel by John Neihardt
- The Quest, a 1922 novel by Pío Baroja
- The Quest (DeMille novel), a 1975 novel by Nelson DeMille
- The Quest, a 1981 novel by Jerry Ahern, the second entry in The Survivalist novel series
- The Quest, a 2000 novel by Christopher Nicole
- The Quest (novel), a 2007 novel by Wilbur Smith
- The Quest: Energy, Security, and the Remaking of the Modern World, a 2011 book by Daniel Yergin

== Television ==
=== Episodes ===
- "The Quest", Bering Sea Gold season 5, episode 3 (2015)
- "The Quest", Blackstar episode 5 (1981)
- "The Quest", Bonanza season 4, episode 2 (1962)
- "The Quest", Dallas season 4, episode 15 (1981)
- "The Quest", Hawkeye episode 10 (1994)
- "The Quest", I'm a Celebrity...Get Me Out of Here! (British) series 18, episode 9 (2018)
- "The Quest", Lost Ollie episode 2 (2022)
- "The Quest", Night Heat season 1, episode 13 (1985)
- "The Quest", Northern Exposure season 6, episode 15 (1995)
- "The Quest", Quarterback episode 1 (2023)
- "The Quest", Sooty Heights series 2, episode 12 (2000)
- "The Quest" (Stargate SG-1), season 10, episodes 10–11 (2006–2007)
- "The Quest", Teen Titans season 4, episode 2 (2005)
- "The Quest", The Amazing World of Gumball season 1, episode 7 (2011)
- "The Quest", The F.B.I. season 5, episode 26 (1970)
- "The Quest", The Glo Friends episodes 1–10 (1986)
- "The Quest: Part 1" and "The Quest: Part 2", The Huntress episodes 26–27 (2001)
- "The Quest", The Life and Times of Grizzly Adams season 2, episode 21 (1978)
- "The Quest", The Sparticle Mystery series 1, episode 4 (2011)
- "The Quest", The Two of Us series 4, episode 9 (1990)
- "The Quest", Unfabulous season 3, episode 10 (2007)
- "The Quest", Whispering Smith episode 8 (1961)
- "The Quest", Xena: Warrior Princess season 2, episode 13 (1997)

=== Shows ===
- The Quest (1976 TV series), a 1976 Western television series starring Kurt Russell
- The Quest (1982 TV series), a 1982 TV series starring Perry King and Noah Beery Jr.
- The Quest (2014 TV series), a fantasy-based reality competition series on ABC
- The Quest (2022 TV series), a 2022 hybrid fantasy adventure/reality TV series on Disney+

== Music ==
- The Quest (ballet), a 1943 ballet by Frederick Ashton with music by William Walton
- The Quest (Sam Rivers album), 1976
- The Quest (Mal Waldron album), a 1962 album by Mal Waldron
- The Quest (Yes album), a 2021 album by Yes
- Benno de Goeij, a Dutch record producer also known as The Quest

== Other uses ==
- The Quest (Corvallis, Oregon), a sculpture in Corvallis, Oregon
- The Quest (Portland, Oregon), a sculpture in Portland, Oregon
- The Quest (1983 video game), a graphical adventure game
- The Quest (2006 video game), a role-playing game
- The Quest (supplement), a 1984 role-playing game supplement
- The QUEST study, a veterinary research study

== See also ==
- The Quests, Singaporean band
- The Quests (American band), American band
- Quest (disambiguation)
- Qwest (disambiguation)
