= Quest (disambiguation) =

A quest is a journey toward a goal.

Quest may also refer to:

== Computing ==
- Quest Development, a software company
- Quest Oracle Community, not-for-profit organization
- QuEST, research program
- Quest Software, a management software company
- Quantum Experiments using Satellite Technology, India's Quantum communication satellite.

== Entertainment ==
=== Film and television ===
- Quest (1983 film), a short film
- Quest (1996 film), an animated short
- Quest (2006 film), an Indian drama film
- Quest (2017 film), an American documentary film
- Quest (TV channel), a UK TV channel
- Quest (American TV network), a US over-the-air television network
- Quest (Australian TV series), a 1970s talent quest television show
- Quest (Canadian TV series), a 1960s television anthology
- Jonny Quest, a fictional character
- Richard Quest (born 1962), English television journalist

=== Gaming ===
- Quest (play-by-mail game), a fantasy, play-by-mail role-playing game released in 1991
- Quest (gamebook), a gamebook in the Fabled Lands series
- Quest (video games), a task within a video game
- Quest (board game), 1978 board game
- Quest 64, a 1998 Nintendo 64 game
- Quest Corporation, a video game company
- Oculus Quest, a virtual reality headset by Oculus
  - Meta Quest 2, a successor to the Oculus Quest
  - Meta Quest Pro, another model of the Oculus Quest
  - Meta Quest 3, another successor to the Oculus Quest

=== Music ===
- Quest (band), an American jazz band
- Quest (singer) (born 1982), Filipino hip-hop and R&B singer and songwriter
- Quest, an American jazz group led by Don Randi
- Quest, a 2016 mini-album by Japanese band White Ash
- Quest Crew, a dance crew

== Organizations ==
- Quest Aircraft, an aircraft manufacturer
- Quest Community Newspapers, a newspaper company in Queensland, Australia
- Quest Diagnostics, a clinical laboratory services company
- Quest International, a flavor and fragrances company
- Quest Nutrition, an American food company
- Quaid-e-Awam University of Engineering, Science & Technology, Pakistan
- Quest University, Canada

== Periodicals ==
- Quest (British magazine), a fortnightly science/technology magazine for youth
- Quest (Dutch magazine), monthly science/technology magazine in the Netherlands
- Quest (Indian magazine)
- Quest (lifestyle magazine)
- Quest (Theosophical magazine), a publication of the Theosophical Society in America
- QUEST: An African Journal of Philosophy
- Quest: The History of Spaceflight, a quarterly journal
- Quest, a publication of the Ambassador International Cultural Foundation

== Science ==
- Shell Canada Quest Energy project carbon capture and storage
- Q and U Extragalactic Submillimeter Telescope, part of cosmic microwave background polarization experiment
- QUEST (Cluster of Excellence), a collaborative research project in Germany
- Quasar Equatorial Survey Team, an astronomical survey in Venezuela
- Quaternion estimator algorithm, a solution to Wahba's problem
- Quest Joint Airlock, part of the International Space Station
- QUEST Q-shu University Experiment with Steady-State Spherical Tokamak, a fusion research experimental device on the campus of Kyushu University in Fukuoka, Japan

== Other ==
- Quest (cigarette), a cigarette brand by Vector Tobacco
- "Quest" (Anderson novelette), a novelette by Poul Anderson
- Quest (ship), a 1917 sealing ship and polar exploration vessel
- Quest, a model of velomobile
- Nissan Quest, a minivan
- Quest Skinner, American mixed media artist

== See also ==
- LaSilla–Quest Variability Survey, an astronomical survey in Chile
- Quest for the historical Jesus
- The Quest (disambiguation)
- Questing (disambiguation)
- Qwest (disambiguation)
- A Tribe Called Quest, an American hip-hop band
- World of Quest, an animated Canadian TV series
