= Diplom =

Academic degree found chiefly in German-speaking countries

A Diplom (German: [diˈploːm], from Ancient Greek: δίπλωμα, romanized: diploma) is an academic degree in the German-speaking countries Germany, Austria, and Switzerland and a similarly named degree in some other European countries including Albania, Bulgaria, Belarus, Bosnia and Herzegovina, Croatia, Estonia, Finland, Poland, Russia, and Ukraine and only for engineers in France, Greece, Hungary, North Macedonia, Romania, Serbia, Slovenia, and Brazil.

== History ==
The Diplom originates from the French Diplôme (Diplôme de l'ordre impérial de la légion d'honneur) describing a certificate devised during the Second French Empire to bestow honours upon outstanding citizens and soldiers of the imperial French army to promote them into the Legion of Honour since 1862. The Magister degree was the original graduate degree at German-speaking universities. In Germany the Diplom dates back to the pre-republican period: In October 1899 the engineering degree Diplom was announced by a supreme decree of the German emperor Wilhelm II in his function as the King of Prussia on the advent of the Centenary of the Technische Hochschule in Charlottenburg (now Technische Universität Berlin). The Diplom was subsequently adopted by the Technische Hochschulen (Institutes of Technology) which had received university status following this Prussian decree. Later, all German universities adopted the Diplom as their degree in science or engineering.

In East Germany, the Diplom was the only first degree and was also granted in disciplines such as medicine or law, which at West German universities were completed with a Staatsexamen. Nowadays such diplomas are still granted to students of such disciplines, although most universities only grant the diplom status (for example "Diplom-Jurist" in law) on request. Some universities also grant a master's degree (e.g. "Magister iuris") to such students on request.

With the implementation of the Bologna process, awarding new Diplom and Magister degrees has become rare, since they are replaced by bachelor's or master's degrees. Already awarded degrees remain valid.

== France ==
'Diplôme' is the French word for degree or diploma. The French engineering diploma is called Diplôme d'Ingénieur (often abbreviated as Dipl. Ing.). The French government also grants to all holders of a Diplôme d'Ingénieur the academic title of Ingénieur Diplômé, which is official and legally protected in France.

== Germany ==
Before the introduction of the bachelor's and master's degrees in Germany, the standard Science, Engineering or Business degree was the Diplom and could be, in several variations, obtained at several types of institutes of higher education.

Obtained at a university, the degree was simply called a Diplom or rarely a Diplom (Univ.) and took usually between four and six years (240–360 European Credit Transfer and Accumulation System credits), depending on subject and curriculum. When obtained at a so-called University of Applied Sciences (or Fachhochschule), the diploma degree is called a Diplom (FH) and took mostly four years (240 ECTS credits).

The Diplom was usually awarded in the natural sciences, business, theology and engineering, while students of humanities, arts and languages finished with a Magister. (The degree in social sciences differed from university to university.) All kinds of Diplom degrees were usually first degrees. However, the Diplom / Diplom (Univ.) was also the highest non-doctoral degree in science, business or engineering in Germany.

The duration of the Diplom degree programmes differed depending on subject and university. An official average duration (Regelstudienzeit) was set by law in each German state, usually being four years for a Diplom (FH) and 4, 4.5 or 5 years for a Diplom / Diplom (Univ.). In exceptional cases, universities were allowed to set longer average durations for certain subjects (HGRP1995 § 26 (3), NHG2007 § 6 (3), HmbHG2001 §53 (3)). However, due to the curriculum set by most universities in Germany, the 4, 4.5 or 5 years for a Diplom / Diplom (Univ.) were often exceeded. Although being a first degree, because of its actual duration, the Diplom / Diplom (Univ.) was and is in Germany not considered as an equivalent to a bachelor's but rather to a master's degree, as also expressed by the equivalent ECTS credits for the Diplom / Diplom (Univ.).

A holder of a Diplom obtained at a university is, depending on subject, for example referred to as "Diplom-Ingenieur" (Diplom-Engineer), "Diplom-Kaufmann" (Diplom-Merchant), "Diplom-Biologe" (Diplom-Biologist) and so on. In Bavaria, sometimes the postfix "(Univ.)" is added. If the Diplom has been obtained at a University of Applied Sciences (Fachhochschule) the postfix "(FH)" has to be added (e.g. Diplom-Ingenieur (FH)). There are a few rare exceptions where the postfix need not be added, mostly due to older laws, small differences in the laws of the German states or transition rules. Transition rules, for example in engineering, or European Union directives like Directive 2005/36/EC grant certain limited groups with other kinds of related qualifications to also use the designation Diplom.

To obtain a Diplom at a university, students had to complete two separate periods of study. The first one was a two-year period of coursework in courses of mainly (but not only) introductory nature, the Grundstudium (meaning basic studying period). After (and during) this period, in addition to exams for passing the modules, students attained a series of usually four intermediate exams to obtain the Vordiplom (meaning pre-diploma).

The second period, the Hauptstudium (meaning main period of study), consisted of two years of coursework in courses of advanced level, an additional period of several months in which a thesis had to be written and eventually a series of usually four final exams. It was not unusual for students to need more than two years for the coursework of the Hauptstudium. An obtained Vordiplom and the completion of the coursework of the Hauptstudium were the requirements to register for working on the thesis and for the final exams. However, access to courses of the Hauptstudium was usually not restricted to students who had already obtained the Vordiplom.

The extent of the final exams and the exams to obtain the Vordiplom was set by each university individually in its regulations. Normally, the content of two different modules of the preceding period of coursework was examined in each of the examinations, which could be oral or less often in writing. Most students needed approximately six months to complete the final exam period.

The thesis which followed an independent (although supervised) research project had officially to be completed in not more than 3 to 9 months (depending on subject and university). However, the actual time students worked on these projects could again exceed the official duration by several months.

The curriculum for a Diplom (FH) degree, obtained at a University of Applied Sciences (Fachhochschule) used to be more application-oriented, in comparison to what was expected for a Univ. Diplom degree. The programme was slightly shorter and often one semester was spent by the students doing an internship. Those with some previous vocational qualification in a subject related to their studies were typically exempt from the requirement to do an internship. Typically, the studies in such a program were more organized and structured than the studies at a university, with a tighter schedule and a larger number of intermediate and final exams. Subjects were split into those regarded as basic studies and in-depth studies. Unlike the universities the period of basic studies (Grundstudium) wasn't completely separated from the period of in-depth studies (Fachstudium) by a pre-diploma. Instead of a pre-diploma the passing of one or more intermediate exams in a subject qualified to move forward with that particular subject or start related in-depth subject studies. Passing one or more final exams in a subject completed a subject. Once almost all subjects were completed thesis work could start, but the missing final exams had to be passed latest with the completion of the thesis work. It was typical to perform thesis work in the industry, supervised by a professor from the university of applied science and a senior professional from the company where the work was performed. Lab work was also permitted as thesis work. The written thesis work needed to be defended in an oral exam after which the diploma was granted.

The Diplom / Diplom (Univ.) is usually a prerequisite for preparing a doctorate (Doktorarbeit). However, under certain conditions, holders of a Diplom (FH) are also eligible for doctoral studies. In German-speaking countries and in countries which Germany has bilateral agreements with—regarding the recognition of academic qualifications, the Diplom / Diplom (Univ.) is usually accepted as admission into doctorate programs.

=== Further kinds of diploma (Germany) ===
While the Diplom / Diplom (Univ.) and the Diplom (FH) were the most common Diplom degrees in Germany, further Diploma did and do exist. Those are:

- Diplom (BA) – The Diplom (BA) was not an academic degree, but instead a qualification designation which students received after completing a three-year programme at a so-called University of Cooperative Education (Berufsakademie). These colleges combined coursework with apprenticeships.
- Diplom (DH) – In the German state of Baden-Württemberg, the Universities of Cooperative Education were transferred into the Baden-Württemberg Cooperative State University (Duale Hochschule Baden-Württemberg) in 2009. Former students of a University of Cooperative Education can transfer their qualification designation Diplom (BA) into the academic degree Diplom (DH)
- Diplom I and Diplom II – Some German universities (for example the University of Kassel) used to offer these academic degrees, where the Diplom I was basically a minor Diplom / Diplom (Univ.) obtained after a shortened program of study, while the Diplom II was the equivalent to the Diplom / Diplom (Univ.).

==== Other uses of the word ====
In the German language the word Diplom can also be used for certificates of any kind of achievement. It is usually apparent from the context if an academic degree is meant or not, especially when the word is combined with the academic profession.

=== International comparison (Germany) ===
Acceptance of the Diplom / Diplom (Univ.) and the Diplom (FH) varies from country to country and from university to university. Usually holders of any of the degrees are considered for admission to postgraduate (not necessarily doctoral) studies. The acceptance or rejection of the diploma not only varies because of different academic standards, but also because of political, regulatory and administrative reasons.

- A bilateral agreement between Germany and France sets the Diplom / Diplom (Univ.) as equivalent to the French Maîtrise.
- In the Netherlands the Diplom / Diplom (Univ.) is usually accepted as equivalent to the Dutch doctorandus or the Dutch master's degree.
- In the United States, evaluations by U.S. universities vary. For example, for admission to graduate studies, the University of Arizona, the University of Central Florida and the University of Wisconsin–Madison require (at least) the Vordiplom plus an additional year of study. The Oregon State University and the University of Southern California consider holders of a Diplom (not differing between (FH) and (Univ.)) for admission to graduate studies. According to World Education Services, a German Diplom is equivalent to having earned both U.S. bachelor's and master's degrees.
- In Canada, the Diplom / Diplom (Univ.) is at most universities the prerequisite to enter a Canadian Master's program, and corresponds generally to a Canadian 4-year Bachelor's/Bachelier degree and an honours bachelor's degree; in all cases to a university Bachelor with Honours degree.
- In Denmark the Diplom (FH) awarded after four years of tuition is considered as being equivalent to a Danish bachelor's degree, whereas the Diplom / Diplom (Univ.) awarded after at least 4 ½ years of tuition merits a Kandidatuddannelse. The German Diplom must not be confused with a Danish Diplomuddannelse which is equivalent to a bachelor's degree.
- In the United Kingdom the University of Aberystwyth, the University College London and the University of Sheffield consider both Diplom or a bachelor's degree as sufficient to enter a postgraduate programme. Also the University of Edinburgh states that it considers both degrees as sufficient to enter postgraduate programmes.
- In the Republic of Ireland, the Diplom (FH) is recognized as being equivalent to a bachelor's honours degree, while a Diplom is considered equivalent to the Irish master's degree if its standard duration was at least 4.5 years.
- In Norway, the authority in charge for the recognition of foreign qualifications Norwegian Agency for Quality Assurance in Education, called the Diplom degree system as being both "complex" and "confusing". The Norwegian Statistical Office compares the Diplom / Diplom (Univ.) with the Norwegian master's degree.
- In Sweden, the Swedish National Agency for Higher Education considers a German Diplom as sufficient for the admission to a Swedish Master's program. On the Conceive-Design-Implement-Operate Conference in 2005 in Kingston, Ontario, Canada, Malmqvist et al. stated that, the Swedish Civilingenjör engineering degree programs "are 4½ year integrated engineering programs roughly equivalent to Master of Science or Diplom-Ingenieur degrees".

=== Comparison between Diplom and Bologna Degrees in Germany ===
The variations in the acceptance of degrees was one reason the EU initiated and executed the Bologna Process. Part of the Bologna Process shall ensure comparability between higher-education qualifications in the EU. As part of this process Germany has introduced Masters and bachelor's degrees and has largely phased out the awarding of new diploma degrees, a process not universally welcomed by the German academic and engineering communities.

The already awarded Diplom / Diplom (Univ.) and the Diplom (FH) degrees remain valid indefinitely and are not exchanged for master's or bachelor's degrees. Current German binding recommendations state that the newly German master's and bachelor's degrees come with the same eligibilities as the old degrees Diplom / Diplom (Univ.) and Diplom (FH), respectively. This is, for example, important for joining certain career paths in government administration, military, or regulated professions, where some kind of diploma was required. It also implies that Diplom (FH) holders can join a master's degree program. It does not imply the degrees are the same, a fact stretched multiple times in the cited reference.

An actual comparison, in case it is needed, is done via ECTS points which are retroactively calculated/assigned to old Diplom / Diplom (Univ.) and Diplom (FH) degrees, when needed. This calculation is done when a holder of a Diploma (FH) wants to join a Masters program and needs to know the number of additional ECTS point to study for to obtain a master's degree.

Since the old diploma study programs were all a bit different there is not a single ECTS value or comparison chart for all kinds of diplomas. Almost universally, however, when retroactively calculating ECTS points for Diplom / Diplom (Univ.) degrees they end up well into the ECTS point range for a master's degree. The situation is different for Diplom (FH) degrees. Those tend to end up at least at the Bachelor's ECTS point level or above, and below the ECTS point level for a master's degree. The ranking is roughly shown in the following table, from lowest to highest rank. Typical ECTS points are provided for a very rough comparison, individual points vary.

| German non-academic degrees | ECTS point Examples |
|---|---|
| Diplom (BA) | – |
| German academic degrees | ECTS point Examples |
| Diplom (DH) | – |
| Bachelor | 180–240 |
| Diplom (FH), Diplom I | 240 |
| Dipl.-Ing., Diplom (Univ.), Diplom II, Master | 300 |

The following chart illustrates the durations required to obtain the old degrees (Diplom, Diplom (FH)) and the new European degrees (bachelor's and master's), using nominal example durations.

At the time of the Bologna process, schools in most German states started changing from 13 school years to 12 years. (An exception are the states of Saxony and Thuringia, where Gymnasium has always lasted only 12 years ever since the German Reunification.) Most of the students going for a Diplom therefore spent 13 years in school before starting their university studies, while the younger Bachelor students nowadays may start one year earlier. (However, in some states, such as Rhineland-Palatinate or Schleswig-Holstein, the first class which completes school after 12 years will graduate as late as 2016.) Regarding international comparison, one may argue that British, Irish and French high school students have school also in the afternoons which could compensate with the (former) additional year of school attendance in Germany.

| 1st year | 2nd year | 3rd year | 4th year | 5th year | 6th year | 7th year | 8th year |
|---|---|---|---|---|---|---|---|
| Bachelors (3 or more years) (Bologna only) | | | Masters (consecutive) | | Doctorate | | |
| Diplom (FH) | | | | 2 Sem. Master | Doctorate | | |
| Diplom (FH) with excellent grades | | | | additional coursework | Doctorate | | |
| Vordiplom | | Diplom (Universität) | | | Doctorate | | |

Note: For the Diplom (FH) a student has to spend one to two obligatory semesters during his studies in a company. These semesters are included in the table. The study time is therefore one to two semesters shorter. Bachelor studies have them included in the table too. For the Diplom (Universität) those semesters are sometimes not included in the table.

Also note: In Germany, a Diplom (Universität) student can enter a doctoral program directly (if the student meets the admission requirements). A Diplom (FH) student has to have excellent grades to directly enter a doctorate program. With the Higher Education Act of the Land Lower Saxony as of August 2010, outstanding Bachelor graduates can commence their doctorate at the universities of this German state. In addition, a few German graduate schools, such as the Saarbrücken Graduate School of Computer Science or the Berlin Mathematical School also admit students with a bachelor's degree and excellent grades to their doctorate programmes.

== Austria ==
The Austrian diploma curriculum is a first degree usually structured into 2–3 phases comprising a total of 240–360 ECTS credits (nominally 4–6 years). It typically ends with a final examination after submitting a "Diplomarbeit" (diploma thesis).

Depending on the subject, the degrees granted are either Magister/Magistra with a specific suffix (such as Magister philosophiae for philosophy), or Diplom-Ingenieur (in engineering). Notable exceptions are the diploma studies of dentistry and medicine, which result in the degree Doctor medicinae universae (Dr. med. univ.) or Doctor medicinae dentalis (Dr. med. dent.)

In most subjects, diplom programmes have already been phased out in favour of separate, Bologna-style Bachelor and Master programmes. However, the degree Diplom-Ingenieur is still used for Master's graduates in engineering.

== Switzerland ==
In Switzerland, the Diplom (German) or Diplôme (French) was the typical first degree at the two federal institutes of technology and at the Swiss universities of applied sciences. Since 2004, these Swiss degrees are no longer offered since they are replaced by Bologna style bachelor's and master's degrees.

== Finland ==
In Finland, the old diplomi-insinööri ("diploma engineer") title was completely replaced by Master of Science (Technology) in the Bologna process. All Finnish academic degrees are awarded both in Finnish and English and therefore the title is still awarded as diplomi-insinööri with Master of Science (Technology) as the official translation. Conversion was straightforward and academic credits were transformed linearly.

== Greece ==
In Greece, a higher education diploma (δίπλωμα/πτυχίο ανώτατης εκπαίδευσης) is a 4 to 5-year (8-10 semester) (240 ISCED 6 - 300 ECTS ISCED 7) degree, 5-year Diplomas formatted similarly to the German Diplom (Uni), awarded to students of the Greek Engineering Schools and Departments (called Polytechnic in Greece – not to be confused though with the polytechnics of the UK).

While every institution has its own individual approaches, the curriculum usually consists of general knowledge and essential background subjects in the first five semesters. After the end of the fifth semester, students select their academic area of interest and pursue a set of specialised courses for the next four semesters. The last semester is devoted to the preparation of a thesis on the student's chosen area of interest, which is presented before a three-member panel.

5 – year Diplomas are considered equivalent to integrated master's degrees. The holder of a diploma in engineering is permitted to sit in the Technical Chamber of Greece exams without any prerequisite. It also allows the engineer to be considered for doctorate studies without taking any additional classes.

Since adoption of the 2001 Higher Education Reform Act (Ν. 2916/2001, Ν. 3549/2007, N. 4009/2011) the Technological Educational Institutes (Τεχνολογικά Εκπαιδευτικά Ιδρύματα – TEI) constitute a parallel part of public higher education in Greece. They confer higher education diploma (δίπλωμα/πτυχίο ανώτατης εκπαίδευσης), a 4-year (8 semester) bachelor's degree formatted similarly to the German Diplom (FH) (240 ECTS – ISCED 6).

Grades range between 0 and 10, 5 being the passing mark. However, since grading practice differs amongst awarding institutions, a descriptive mark is used, which is more or less universal throughout Greece. For example, in the National Technical University of Athens, a grade in the diploma between 5 and 6.99 is "good" (καλώς), a grade between 7.00 and 8.99 is "very good" (λίαν καλώς) and a grade of 9.00 or more is "excellent" (άριστα). In the University of Patras the ranges are from 5 to 6.49 (good), from 6.5 to 8.49 (very good) and from 8.5 to 10 (excellent).

== See also ==
- Diploma
- DEA (former French degree)
- Specialist, an analogous degree in Russia and CIS (former USSR)
- German Academic Exchange Service
