= ICDD =

ICDD may refer to:

- International Centre for Diffraction Data, a nonprofit scientific organization
- Imperial Circus Dead Decadence, a Japanese symphonic black metal band
- Intellectual capital due diligence, part of operational due diligence
- International Center for Development and Decent Work, part of the University of Kassel
- ICD-D, self-optimising production systems in Integrative Production Technology for High-Wage Countries
- Institute for Civic Discourse and Democracy, an interdisciplinary, non-partisan organization formed by Kansas State University in 2004
