= Oh My Friend (soundtrack) =

Soundtrack album by Rahul Raj
- Released: 15 October 2011
- Recorded: 2011
- Genre: Film soundtrack
- Length: 25:32
- Language: Telugu
- Label: Aditya Music
- Producer: Rahul Raj

Rahul Raj chronology
Chekavar (2010)	Oh My Friend (2011)	Bachelor Party (2012)

Oh My Friend is the soundtrack album to the 2011 film of the same name directed by Venu Sriram and produced by Dil Raju, starring Siddharth, Shruti Haasan, Hansika Motwani and Navdeep. The film's soundtrack is composed by Rahul Raj, with one song composed by Anil R. and featured lyrics written by Krishna Chaitanya and Sirivennela Seetharama Sastry. The soundtrack was distributed under the Aditya Music label and released on 15 October 2011 to positive reviews and was a commercial success.

== Development ==
Initially, Dil Raju wanted Mickey J. Meyer to compose music for the film. However, Sriram had listened to the songs composed by Malayalam film composer Rahul Raj on the internet and was very impressed. He immediately contacted the composer, who in return, sent his tunes through email which Raju and Sriram liked it and eventually brought on board for the film. The film marked Raj's Telugu film debut as a composer. Raj added that he signed Oh My Friend as he wanted to take a break from Malayalam cinema and added that the Tamil and Telugu film industries allow him to take more time to discuss and work on the music.

The film also featured one song "Sri Chaitanya" which was composed by Anil R., who died prior to the film's release. The song was performed by Siddharth and Shruti themselves, and was the last song Anil had composed. He received the offer from his friend and fellow lyricist Krishna Chaitanya, who dedicated the song in his memory. Sirivennela Seetharama Sastry wrote three songs for the film in a span of six months. Raju insisted Sastry to use one of his songs for another film and instead write lyrics for a fresh song.

During post-production, Mani Sharma was brought in to compose the background score. Sharma recorded the film score in Chennai on 24 October and completed the re-recording within 5 November.

== Release ==
Aditya Music acquired the film's audio rights. The title track "Oh Oh Oh My Friend" was released at an FM station on 9 October 2011. The film's audio was launched at the Shilpakala Vedika in Hyderabad on 15 October 2011, with the cast and crew in attendance. The event was further telecasted live on Maa TV.

The album had record sales of 300,000 CDs within nine days of release. The producers hosted the audio success function by releasing triple platinum disc shields on 5 November 2011, six days before the film's release.

== Reception ==
Radhika Rajamani of Rediff.com noted that "Rahul Raj's music has a fresh appeal". Sify wrote "Music is superb, and comes as a saving grace. Songs and locations are good. Rahul Raj scored good beats and composed fine tunes. Mani Sharma’s background score is average." Karthik Srinivasan of Milliblog wrote "Even as the soundtrack gets the attitude right, the tunes are way too familiar to make an impact." The New Indian Express described the music as "soothing". Y. Sunita Chowdhary of The Hindu summarized "Anil R. who passed away leaves his last composition; the rest by Rahul Raj is quite pleasant. Seetarama Sastry's lyrics are like a string of pearls." Analyzing the trends of Telugu film music in the 2010s, Krishna Sripada mentioned the soundtrack having "heavy rock influences and new sounds. Karthik’s title track and Benny Dayal’s ‘Nuvvu Nenu Jattu’ are outstanding."

== Track listing ==
All music is composed by Rahul Raj, except where noted.

No.	Title	Lyrics	Singer(s)	Length
1.	"Oh Oh Oh My Friend"	Krishna Chaitanya	Karthik	4:17
2.	"Nuvvu Nenu Jattu"	Sirivennela Seetharama Sastry	Benny Dayal	1:57
3.	"Sri Chaitanya" (composed by Anil R.)	Krishna Chaitanya	Siddharth, Shruti Haasan	4:30
4.	"Alochana Vasthene"	Sirivennela Seetharama Sastry	Ranjith, Sangeetha Prabhu, Sarah Straub	4:45
5.	"Vegam Vegam"	Krishna Chaitanya	Benny Dayal, Kavita Mohan, Ranjith, Desmond. F	3:05
6.	"Nenu Thaanani"	Sirivennela Seetharama Sastry	Ranjith	4:35
7.	"Maa Daddy Pockets"	Krishna Chaitanya	Siddharth	4:06
