= Radermacher =

Radermacher is a family name. Notable people with the name include:

- Erika Radermacher (born 1936), German pianist
- Franz Josef Radermacher (born 1950), German mathematician and economist
- Jacob Cornelis Matthieu Radermacher (1741–1783), Dutch botanist and author
- Ludwig Radermacher (1867–1952), German-Austrian classical philologist
