= School of Physics and Astronomy =

School of Physics and Astronomy may refer to:

- School of Physics and Astronomy, University of Edinburgh
- Department of Physics and Astronomy, University of Manchester, formerly University of Manchester School of Physics and Astronomy
- Cardiff School of Physics and Astronomy
- Bonn-Cologne Graduate School of Physics and Astronomy
