= Ecotropica =

Ecotropica is the peer-reviewed international scientific journal of the European Society for Tropical Ecology, GTOE. The journal first appeared in 1995 and received an impact factor in 2011.

Ecotropica covers all aspects of tropical ecology, and normally appears twice annually. Papers reflect results of original research (major papers, short communications) or review important fields in tropical ecology.

Current editor is Marco Tschapka at the University of Ulm in Germany. One of the former editors was Elisabeth Kalko.
