= German Universities Excellence Initiative =

German education initiative

German Universities of Excellence: Current (red) and past (purple)

The Excellence Initiative of the German Council of Science and Humanities and the German Research Foundation (DFG) aims to promote cutting-edge research and to create outstanding conditions for young scholars at universities, to deepen cooperation between disciplines and institutions, to strengthen international cooperation of research, and to enhance the international appeal of excellent German universities. It is the result of lengthy negotiations between the federal government and the German states.

== Overview ==
Since almost all German universities are public (most private universities do not have the official German "Universitätsstatus"), and therefore mainly paid by taxes and generally egalitarian, there is no German Ivy League of private higher education institutions. However, the Excellence Initiative aims to strengthen some selected public universities more than others in order to raise their international visibility. Thus, the German "Universities of Excellence" are sometimes considered the German Ivy League of public institutions, and these universities are commonly referred to by the media as "elite universities". The initiative is conducted by the DFG together with the German Science and Humanities Council (WR). More than 30 universities in total received funding. It includes three lines of funding:

1. The establishment of more than 40 research schools for young scientists and PhD candidates, which will receive €1 million each per year.
2. The creation of thirty so-called Clusters of Excellence, that connect universities with leading German research institutes and businesses. Annually, these clusters will receive around €6.5 million each to fund their work.
3. The selection of 11 Universities of Excellence, which will be funded highly for their "future concepts", i.e., institutional strategies to promote top-level university research. Particularly this third line of funding has drawn appreciable international attention, both in academia and media.

Altogether €2.7 billion (€1.9 billion for 2007–2012) of additional funds have been distributed over the course of five years, most of this coming from the federal government. The WR is responsible for the third line of funding, and the DFG is responsible for the first and second lines of funding.

== Results ==
=== Winners: Future Concept 2019–2026 (current projects) ===
11 future concepts across 13 universities were selected for funding in 2019. Six universities retained their status for a third time: RWTH Aachen, FU Berlin (as part of the Berlin University Alliance), Heidelberg University, University of Konstanz, LMU Munich, and Technical University of Munich. Three further universities retained their status for a second consecutive time: HU Berlin (as part of the Berlin University Alliance), TU Dresden, and the University of Tübingen. The Karlsruhe Institute of Technology returned to excellence status for a second time after having been funded in the first round (2006). The three first-time excellence universities are the University of Bonn, University of Hamburg, and TU Berlin (as part of the Berlin University Alliance).

University	Motto	Year of Award
RWTH Aachen University	The Integrated Interdisciplinary University of Science and Technology: Knowledge, Impact, Networks	2007/2012/2019
Berlin University Alliance	Crossing Boundaries toward an Integrated Research Environment	2007/2012/2019
University of Bonn	WE invest in people – WE foster networks – WE create impact	2019
TU Dresden	TUD 2028 Synergy and beyond	2012/2019
University of Hamburg	A Flagship University: Innovation and Cooperation for a Sustainable Future	2019
Heidelberg University	The comprehensive research university Heidelberg: The future since 1386	2007/2012/2019
Karlsruhe Institute of Technology	The Research University in the Helmholtz Association: Living the Change	2006/2019
University of Konstanz	creative.together	2007/2012/2019
LMU Munich	LMUexcellent – A new perspective	2006/2012/2019
Technical University of Munich	TUM. The Entrepreneurial University: Innovation by Talents, Excellence, and Responsibility	2006/2012/2019
University of Tübingen	Research – Relevance – Responsibility: Open to New Challenges and a Global Scope of Action	2012/2019

=== Winners: Future Concept 2012–2019 (completed projects) ===
Out of the 140 universities in Germany 11 universities were chosen, among them five new winners (HU Berlin, University of Bremen, University of Cologne, TU Dresden, University of Tübingen) and six title holders: RWTH Aachen, FU Berlin, Heidelberg University, University of Konstanz, LMU Munich, and Technical University of Munich. As in 2006 and 2007, also other universities were awarded for special clusters of excellence and renowned graduate schools.

University	Title	Year of Award
RWTH Aachen University	RWTH 2020: Meeting Global Challenges	2007
Freie Universität Berlin	International Network University	2007
Humboldt University of Berlin	Education through science	2012
University of Bremen	AMBITIOUS AND AGILE	2012
University of Cologne	Meeting the Challenge of Change and Complexity	2012
TU Dresden	The synergetic university	2012
Heidelberg University	Heidelberg: Realizing the Potential of a Comprehensive University	2007
University of Konstanz	Model Konstanz – towards a culture of creativity	2007
LMU Munich	LMUexcellent: Working brains – Networking minds – Living knowledge	2006
Technical University of Munich	TUM. The Entrepreneurial University	2006
University of Tübingen	Research − Relevance − Responsibility	2012

=== Winners: Future Concept 2006/2007–2012 (completed projects) ===
University	Title	Year of Award
LMU Munich	LMUexcellent: Working brains – Networking minds – Living knowledge	2006
Technical University of Munich	TUM. The Entrepreneurial University	2006
University of Karlsruhe	A Concept for the Future of the University of Karlsruhe. The Foundation of the Karlsruhe Institute of Technology (KIT)	2006
RWTH Aachen University	RWTH 2020: Meeting Global Challenges	2007
Freie Universität Berlin	International Network University	2007
University of Freiburg	Windows for Research, New Universitas	2007
University of Göttingen	Göttingen. Tradition – Innovation – Autonomie	2007
Heidelberg University	Heidelberg: Realizing the Potential of a Comprehensive University	2007
University of Konstanz	Model Konstanz – towards a culture of creativity	2007

The funding for a future concept does often, but not necessarily result in a superior overall budget compared to other German universities. For example, due to its small size, the University of Constance is, despite this additional funding, not included in the top 20 funded universities in Germany.

==== Current international standing ====
According to the Third European Report on Science & Technology Indicators, an official document compiled by the European Commission, four of the Universities of Excellence are among Europe's top 10 universities: Technical University of Munich (joint 3rd), Freiburg (joint 6th), Karlsruhe (joint 6th), and Heidelberg (joint 9th).

In the Academic Ranking of World Universities 2012, Technical University of Munich (53), LMU Munich (60), Heidelberg (62), and Freiburg (99) are included in the global top 100, heading the field of German universities by those criteria.

Eight of the eleven Universities of Excellence are included in the world's top 250 universities, according to the QS World University Ranking 2012: Technical University of Munich (53); Heidelberg (55); LMU Munich (60); Free University of Berlin (87); Humboldt University of Berlin (130); Tübingen (144); RWTH Aachen (150); Cologne (247). The Times Higher Education World University Ranking 2012 ranks 8 of these 11 Universities of Excellence among the world's 250 top universities: LMU Munich (45); Heidelberg (73); Technical University of Munich (88); Humboldt University of Berlin (109); Free University of Berlin (151); RWTH Aachen (168); Tübingen (187); Konstanz (194).

Federal Education Minister Annette Schavan said following the awards ceremony, "The excellence initiative is writing scientific history. Research at German universities finds itself on a successful, international course."

=== Winners: Graduate Schools (completed projects) ===
Source: Federal Ministry of Education and Research

(coordinating) University	Graduate School	Year of Award
RWTH Aachen University	Aachen Institute for Advanced Study in Computational Engineering Science	2006
Freie Universität Berlin	Graduate School of North American Studies (John F. Kennedy-Institute for North American Studies)	2006
Humboldt University of Berlin	Berlin School of Mind and Brain	2006
Technische Universität Berlin (FU Berlin, HU Berlin)	Berlin Mathematical School	2006
Ruhr University Bochum	Ruhr University Research School	2006
University of Bonn	Bonn Graduate School of Economics	2006
University of Bremen	Global Change in the Marine Realm	2006
TU Dresden	Dresden International Graduate School for Biomedicine and Bioengineering	2006
University of Erlangen-Nuremberg	Erlangen Graduate School in Advanced Optical Technologies	2006
University of Freiburg	Spemann Graduate School of Biology and Medicine	2006
University of Gießen	International Graduate Centre for the Study of Culture	2006
Hannover Medical School	Hannover Biomedical Research School	2006
Heidelberg University	Heidelberg Graduate School of Fundamental Physics	
Karlsruhe Institute of Technology	Karlsruhe School of Optics and Photonics	2006
University of Mannheim	Empirical and Quantitative Methods in the Economic and Social Sciences	2006
LMU Munich	Graduate School of Systemic Neurosciences	2006
Technical University of Munich	International Graduate School of Science and Engineering	2006
Saarland University	Multimodal Computing and Interaction	2006
University of Würzburg	Graduate School for Life Sciences	2006
University of Bayreuth	Bayreuth International Graduate School of African Studies	2007
Freie Universität Berlin	Muslim Cultures and Societies: Unity and Diversity	2007
Freie Universität Berlin	Friedrich Schlegel Graduate School of Literary Studies	2007
Humboldt University of Berlin	Berlin-Brandenburg School for Regenerative Therapies	2007
Humboldt University of Berlin	Berlin Graduate School of Social Sciences	2007
Bielefeld University	Bielefeld Graduate School in History and Sociology	2007
University of Bonn	Bonn-Cologne Graduate School of Physics and Astronomy	2007
University of Bremen	Bremen International Graduate School of Social Sciences	2007
Technische Universität Darmstadt	Graduate School of Computational Engineering "Beyond Traditional Sciences"	2007
University of Göttingen	Göttingen Graduate School for Neurosciences and Molecular Biosciences	2007
Heidelberg University	Heidelberg Graduate School of Mathematical and Computational Methods for the Sciences	2007
Heidelberg University	The Hartmut Hoffmann-Berling International Graduate School of Molecular and Cellular Biology	2007
University of Jena	Jena School for Microbial Communication	2007
Kiel University	Graduate School for Integrated Studies of Human Development in Landscapes	2007
University of Konstanz	Konstanz Research School "Chemical Biology"	2007
University of Leipzig	Building with Molecules and Nano-Objects	2007
University of Lübeck	Graduate School for Computing in Medicine and Life Sciences	2007
University of Mainz	Materials Science in Mainz	2007
Saarland University	Saarbrücken Graduate School of Computer Science	2007
University of Stuttgart	Graduate School for advanced Manufacturing Engineering in Stuttgart (GSaME)	2007
University of Ulm	International Graduate School in Molecular Medicine Ulm	2007

=== Winners: Clusters of Excellence (partly completed projects) ===
(coordinating) University	Clusters of Excellence	Year of Award
RWTH Aachen University	Integrative Production Technology for High-Wage Countries	2006
RWTH Aachen University	Ultra High-Speed Mobile Information and Communication (UMIC)	2006
RWTH Aachen University	Tailor-Made Fuels from Biomass	2007
Freie Universität Berlin / Humboldt University of Berlin	Topoi. The Formation and Transformation of Space and Knowledge in Ancient Civilizations	2006
University of Bonn	Mathematics: Foundations, Models, Applications	2006
TU Dresden	From Cells to Tissues to Therapies: Engineering the Cellular Basis of Regeneration	2006
TU Dresden	Center for Advancing Electronics Dresden (cfaed)	
Johann Wolfgang Goethe University Frankfurt am Main	Macromolecular Complexes (CEF)	2006
University of Gießen	Cardio-Pulmonary System	2006
University of Göttingen	Microscopy at the Nanometer Range	2006
Hannover Medical School	From Regenerative Biology to Reconstructive Therapy	2006
Heidelberg University	Cellular Networks: From Analysis of Molecular Mechanisms to a Quantitative Understanding of Complex Functions	2006
Karlsruhe Institute of Technology	Center for Functional Nanostructures	2006
Kiel University	The Future Ocean	2006
University of Konstanz	Cultural Foundations of Social Integration	2006
LMU Munich	Center for Integrated Protein Science Munich	2006
LMU Munich	Munich Center for Advanced Photonics	2006
LMU Munich	Nanosystems Initiative Munich	2006
Technical University of Munich	Cognition for Technical Systems	2006
Technical University of Munich	Origin and Structure of the Universe – The Cluster of Excellence for Fundamental Physics	2006
Freie Universität Berlin	Languages of Emotion	2007
Humboldt-Universität Berlin	NeuroCure: Towards a Better Outcome of Neurological Disorders	2007
Technische Universität Berlin	Unifying Concepts in Catalysis	2007
Bielefeld University	Cognitive Interaction Technology	2007
University of Bremen	The Ocean in the Earth System	2007
Darmstadt University of Technology	Smart Interfaces: Understanding and Designing Fluid Boundaries	2007
University of Erlangen-Nuremberg	Engineering of Advanced Materials – Hierarchical Structure Formation for Functional Devices	2007
Johann Wolfgang Goethe University Frankfurt am Main	Formation of Normative Orders	2007
University of Freiburg	Centre for Biological Signalling Studies – From Analysis to Synthesis	2007
University of Hamburg	Integrated Climate System Analysis and Prediction (CliSAP)	2007
University of Hannover	Centre for Quantum Engineering and Space-Time Research (QUEST)	2007
Heidelberg University	Asia and Europe in a Global Context: Shifting Asymmetries in Cultural Flows (EXC270)	2007
Kiel University	Inflammation at Interfaces	2007
University of Cologne	Cellular Stress Responses in Aging-Associated Diseases	2007
University of Münster	Religion and Politics in Pre-Modern and Modern Cultures	2007
Saarland University	Multimodal Computing and Interaction	2007
University of Stuttgart	Simulation Technology	2007
University of Tübingen	CIN – Centre for Integrative Neuroscience	2007
University of Hamburg	The Hamburg Centre for Ultrafast Imaging (CUI)	2012
RWTH Aachen University	Integrative Production Technology for High-Wage Countries	2012
RWTH Aachen University	Tailor-Made Fuels from Biomass	2012
Freie Universität Berlin / Humboldt University of Berlin	NeuroCure	2012
Freie Universität Berlin / Humboldt University of Berlin	TOPOI – The Formation and Transformation of Space and Knowledge in Ancient Civilizations	2012
Leipzig University	Leipzig Center of Metabolism	2025

== Reception ==
Whether the Excellence Initiative has had a positive effect is currently a matter of debate. A report by the WZB Berlin Social Science Centre indicates that the program failed to create more diverse education options and produced little in the way of lasting change. Additionally, the Goethe Institut claims that an additional criticism is that "competition up to now has focussed exclusively on the research rather than the teaching at universities", that prevailing qualitative imbalances in East and West German education systems may potentially be perpetuated via the program (by favoring more established Western universities over their younger Eastern counterparts), and, furthermore, that the funding may actually be insufficient to achieve the goal of creating "globally competitive universities".

However, an international commission led by physicist Dieter Imboden of the ETH Zurich in Switzerland praised the program, saying it had a "very positive" influence on higher education in Germany, and recommending it be extended and further developed.
