= Martin Bossert =

German university teacher

Martin Bossert from Ulm University, Ulm, Germany was named Fellow of the Institute of Electrical and Electronics Engineers (IEEE) in 2012 for contributions to reliable data transmission including code constructions and soft decision decoding.

Bossert received his Dipl.-Ing. degree in Electrical Engineering from the Technical University of Karlsruhe, Germany in 1981, and his Ph.D. from the Technische Universität Darmstadt, Germany in 1987.
