= Vampyressa elisabethae =

Scientific classification
- Kingdom: Animalia
- Phylum: Chordata
- Class: Mammalia
- Order: Chiroptera
- Family: Phyllostomidae
- Genus: Vampyressa
- Species: V. elisabethae

Binomial name
- Vampyressa elisabethae Tavares, Gardner, Ramírez-Chaves, and Velazco, 2014

Species of bat

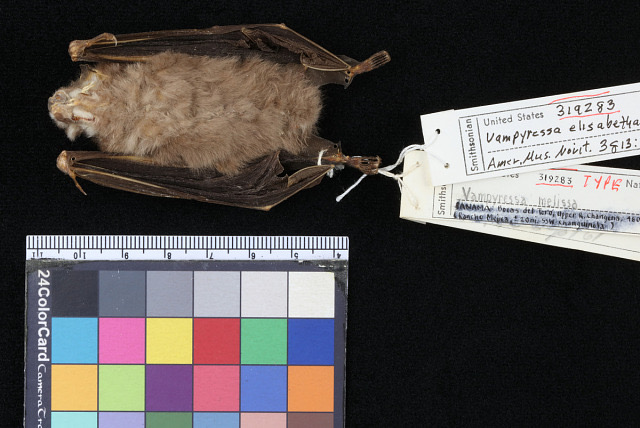

Vampyressa elisabethae, also known Elisabeth's yellow-eared bat, is a species of bat in the family Phyllostomidae. It is endemic to northern Panama, in the province of Bocas del Toro. It is named after Elisabeth Klara Viktoria Kalko. The species has not been observed after the 1970s and may currently be extinct.

== Taxonomy ==
Vampyressa elisabethae was formally described in 2014 based on an adult male holotype. The holotype was collected in 1961 in a montane evergreen forest (approximately 1,500 meters above sea level) in "Rancho Mojica", a locality 32 km away from Changuinola in Panama. The specific epithet honors Elisabeth Klara Viktoria Kalko for her contributions to the study of bats. The species has the common name Elisabeth's yellow-eared bat.

A recent study obtained cytochrome b gene sequences from the holotype, including it in a phylogenetic analysis of the genus. It was shown that it has a high degree of molecular divergence from the other Vampyressa. In the phylogeny it is recovered as the sister group of a clade composed by V. melissa and V. voragine.

== Description ==
Vampyressa elisabethae is a rather large bat for its genus, reaching a length of 58 mm (2.3 in) and a forearm length of 36.2–37.8 mm (1.43–1.49 in).

== Distribution and conservation ==
Vampyressa elisabethae is endemic to the country of Panama and is known only from the province of Bocas del Toro. The species has not been observed after the 1970s and may currently be extinct. New surveys within its range are needed to confirm its continued existence.
