= Dieter Grossmann =

Dieter Großmann (born 1926), studied art at the Academy of Arts, Berlin/Germany at Professor Tank and Professor Speidel (Master Class) from 1948 to 1952. From 1974 to 1992 he taught painting the nude at the Academy of Adult Education Courses and at the Ulm University, Ulm, Germany. He was born in Frankfurt an der Oder.

Since 1970 he is a member of the Berufsverband Bildender Künstler (Association of Professional German Painters) and since 2000 he has chosen the computer as his medium. He is a digital artist worldwide.

He has won several awards and prizes working in traditional and digital media.

== Awards and prizes (excerpt) ==
- 1966 Silver Medal for Graphic Design, Berlin/Germany
- 1973 Gold Medal for Graphic Design, Berlin/Germany
- 1976 Bronce Medal "Art in Medicine", Cologne/Germany
- 1998 First prize for computer painting in Germany 1998, "Tetenal Creative Inkjet
