= BuildMoNa =

The Graduate School BuildMoNa ("Leipzig School of Natural Sciences – Building with Molecules and Nano-objects") at Universität Leipzig, Germany, focuses on interdisciplinary graduate education through top-level, synergistic research in the areas of physics, chemistry and biosciences

The Graduate School BuildMoNa was founded in November 2007 within the German Excellence Initiative. The Graduate School BuildMoNa is a class at the Research Academy Leipzig. As of 2025 90-100 graduates are enrolled at BuildMoNa.

== Research Concept ==
The materials research concept is based on a "bottom-up" approach. Progressive building blocks, such as nano-objects, smart molecules, polymeric scaffolds, and active proteins, will be combined – preferentially by self-organization – to create fundamentally new classes of materials that are inspired by active, adaptive living matter, and that are environmentally friendly, highly efficient, low-cost devices serving multifunctional purposes for a steadily more diversified modern society. The paradigm shift from uniform bulk materials towards nanostructured multifunctional materials that emerge from combinations of smart molecules, proteins, and nano-objects is essential for future knowledge transfer from fundamental to applied sciences.

== Doctoral Training ==
Doctoral students with an MSc (or equivalent degree) or an outstanding BSc from around the world have the possibility to receive within three years the degree Dr. rer. nat. from Universität Leipzig. The training consists of research work and a well-structured training program with modules focusing on interdisciplinary knowledge transfer in important fields of materials science including essential related methods. Further multidisciplinary training activities are transferable skills modules, industrial training, research stays abroad and participations in international conferences.
