= International Graduate School in Molecular Medicine Ulm =

German molecular medicine research institute

Coordinates: 48°25′25″N 9°57′25″E

- Established: 2006
- Field of research: Molecular medicine
- Director: Bernd Knöll
- Board of directors: Bernd Knöll; Manfred Frick; Dieter Rautenbach; Maja Vujić Spasić
- Nickname: IGradU
- Operating agency: Ulm University
- Website: www.uni-ulm.de/mm

The International Graduate School in Molecular Medicine Ulm (IGradU) of Ulm University has been established in 2006 and has been a permanent structure of Ulm University since 2020. It promotes and supports graduate education and training in the field of biomedical research. There are two structured training programmes on offer: The International PhD Programme in Molecular Medicine Ulm for doctoral candidates in the natural sciences and the programme Experimental Medicine for doctoral candidates in human and dental medicine.

== Scientific profile ==
Molecular medicine is a research focus of Ulm University, documented by various externally funded research networks in a national and international context. The Graduate School is responsible for the training of doctoral students within these networks and beyond. It is the objective of the Graduate School to strengthen the scientific performance of Ulm University in the field of Molecular Medicine. Main areas of research cover the topics Oncology, Neurology, Infectious Diseases and Systems Biology, Aging, Degeneration, Trauma, Regeneration and Immune Modulation .

== History ==
The doctoral training programme entitled International PhD Programme in Molecular Medicine was launched in October 2005, and, in 2006, established as central facility of Ulm University as “Graduate School in Molecular Medicine”. From 2007 until 2019, IGradU was supported by the DFG (German Research Foundation).

== International PhD Programme in Molecular Medicine ==
Speaker: Prof. Dr. Bernd Knöll, Institute of Neurobiochemistry

A doctoral training program entitled International PhD Programme in Molecular Medicine was launched in October 2005 and offers a three-year structured doctorate. The training of researchers is the key task of the International PhD Programme in Molecular Medicine. The major aims in this respect are:

- to improve graduate training by creating an active, motivating, excellent and international research environment
- to foster critical thinking and acting, creativity and personal responsibility
- to encourage graduates to develop their own ideas, discuss them in an open forum and to convert them into meaningful action
- to generate an international environment within which students can work with tolerance and respect for people from different cultural backgrounds
- to encourage graduates to carry out independent scientific research by adopting a multilevel supervision and mentoring approach
- to guide graduate education by establishing a definitive and transparent program structure
- to advance graduate career opportunities in the academic world and in industry.

Each doctoral student is supervised by a Thesis Advisory Committee (TAC) consisting of three members. The TAC supervises PhD students in their daily laboratory work, monitors the progress of their work and evaluates oral examinations as well as the written dissertation. This multiple supervision approach supports the independence of the PhD students as young researchers.

=== Structure of the PhD Programme in Molecular Medicine ===
==== Admission ====
The admission regulations stipulate clear criteria for selection: above average degree in a molecular medicine related master study programme (MSc, State Exam with a minimum grade of 2 according to the German grading system or equivalent); proof of proficiency in English; a scientific presentation to members of the faculty during the “Selection Days”. Applicants must have secured a PhD position at a member institute of the IGradU before applying.

==== Study programme ====
Study Plan International PhD Programme in Molecular Medicine Ulm
	1st Year			2nd Year			3rd Year		
Course	Term 1	Term 2		Term 1	Term 2		Term 1	Term 2	
Lecture Series									
Improve your textbook knowledge									
Journal Club									
Progress Report									
Project Plan									
Good Scientific Practice									
Optional activities									
Practical courses									
Doctoral thesis			evaluation			evaluation			
Disputation									exam

The International PhD Programme in Molecular Medicine is taught entirely in English. During the three-year period of studies, students must take part in a number of compulsory activities. Central teaching activities include the lecture Improve your Textbook Knowledge as well as a Journal Club and the biweekly seminar Progress Report. The lecture Improve your Textbook Knowledge allows graduates from different disciplines to refresh the basic knowledge needed to perform research in molecular medicine independently of their scientific background. In the seminar Progress Report, students are trained to communicate and present their own research data to their fellow students and to place it in a broader international context. Furthermore, graduates must attend a series of lectures presented by external speakers. Another compulsory course is the seminar Good Scientific Practice which takes place at the beginning of practical work.

In addition to curricular seminars and lectures, PhD students are offered a variety of optional activities like organized excursions to pharmaceutical and biotech companies. Summer schools and other scientific events in cooperation with international partner universities and partners from industry motivate students to deepen their knowledge in basic science and practical applications. Furthermore, scientific retreats focusing on particular research topics are offered. In addition, there are competence seminars organized in order to improve the employability of the graduates.

In the second year of doctoral training, students are expected to attend two practical trainings/internships in different laboratories or in industry. This allows them to learn new and innovative techniques that go beyond their own research field and to establish contact to possible employers.

==== Spring- and Fall Meetings ====
A particular element of the training concept are the two intermediate evaluations that students must pass on completion of their first and second years of study. Both exams take place during international meetings held as biannual symposia (so-called Spring and Fall Meetings) and consist of a poster presentation and, after year 2, an additional public talk. Through their public frame the exams help to actively integrate the graduates into the international scientific community and to ensure proper progress in the scientific project. PhD Students have the chance to seek advice from professional international scientists.

==== Obtainable Dregrees ====
At the end of the PhD studies, students can obtain the German degree Doctor rerum naturalium (Dr. rer. nat.) or the international degree Doctor of Philosophy (PhD). The opportunity for graduates to choose their degrees is a unique feature of the Medical Faculty and the Graduate School at Ulm University.

== Programme Experimental Medicine ==
Speaker: Prof. Dr. Thomas Wirth, Institute of Physiological Chemistry

In 2005, in order to combat deficiencies in the supervision and quality of medical theses, the Medical Faculty implemented the structured training program Experimental Medicine, which was subsequently adopted by the Graduate School in 2009. The requirement for entry is an above-average intermediate examination (part one of the national medical licensing exam). Doctoral candidates must interrupt their studies in medicine for nine months in order to concentrate fully on their experimental work. The Medical Faculty supports this program of up to 40 stipends yearly. Doctoral candidates submit reports on their research work in the program's seminars in addition to giving presentations of up-to-date scientific literature in a Journal Club.

== Integration of DFG Research Training Groups ==
IGradU is the central graduate programme for doctoral students connected to the following DFG-funded collaborative research centres (CRC) or Research Training Groups (RTG) at Ulm University.

- CRC 1149 Danger Response, Disturbance Factors and Regenerative Potential after Acute Trauma
- CRC 1506 Aging at Interfaces
- CRC 1279 The exploration of the Human Peptidome
- CRC 1074 Bridging basic, translational and (pre)clinical research in the field of leukemia
- RTG 3012 KEMAI Knowledge Infusion and Extraction for Explainable Medical AI (Starting January 2025)

Past research training groups comprise

- RTG 1041 Molecular Diabetology and Endocrinology in Medicine (2004-2013)
- RTG 1789 CEMMA: Cellular and Molecular Mechanisms in Aging (2013-2022)
- RTG 2203 PULMOSENS: Micro- and nano-scale sensor technologies for the lung (2016-2021)
- RTG 2254 HEIST: Heterogeneity and Evolution in Solid Tumors (2017-2021)

== International partner institutions ==
Since its foundation in 2006, the Graduate School has established close cooperation with the following international partner institutions:

Since 2016, there has been a collaboration project with the Southeast University (SEU) in Nanjing, China. The Chinese partner annually sends up to five doctoral students who are funded by the CSC for conducting their doctoral studies at Ulm University. Furthermore, both partners participate in a yearly Springschool for medical Students in Nanjing.

Master students in Molecular Medicine at Ulm University, 30 % of whom continue their academic career at IGradU, can choose a Master Double-Degree Programme with partner universities in Padua/Italy or Oulu/Finland. In each of these programmes up to five students per year can spend one or two semesters at one of the partner universities.

== See also ==
- City of Ulm
- Ulm University
- German Research Foundation
- German Universities Excellence Initiative
- List of Graduate Schools funded by the Excellence Initiative
