= John M. Sullivan (mathematician) =

American mathematician

John Matthew Sullivan (born February 25, 1963) is an American mathematician who works in Germany as a professor at Technische Universität Berlin. His research includes work on knot theory, constant-mean-curvature surfaces, mathematical foams, scientific visualization, and mesh generation.

== Early life and education ==
Sullivan was born in Princeton, New Jersey, and graduated summa cum laude from Harvard University in 1985. He earned a master's degree from the University of Cambridge in 1986, and a doctorate from Princeton University in 1990 under the supervision of Frederick J. Almgren, Jr.

== Career ==
After postdoctoral studies at The Geometry Center and the Mathematical Sciences Research Institute, Sullivan joined the faculty of the University of Illinois at Urbana–Champaign in 1997. He moved to Berlin in 2003, and chaired the Berlin Mathematical School from 2012 to 2014.

== Awards ==
In 2012, he became one of the inaugural Fellows of the American Mathematical Society.
