= Heiner Fangerau =

German medical ethicist and medical historian

- Died: 1972 (age 53–54)
- Scientific career
- Fields: History of medicine
- Institutions: Heinrich Heine University Düsseldorf

Heiner Fangerau (born 1972) is a German historian of medicine and medical ethicist at Heinrich-Heine-University of Duesseldorf.

== Teaching positions ==
Since 2009 Heiner Fangerau held chairs in the history, philosophy and ethics of medicine at Ulm University (2009–2014), the University of Cologne (2014/2015) and the Heinrich-Heine-University of Duesseldorf.

== Academic works ==
Fangerau's research focuses the history of the biomedical model in the 19th and 20th century. He investigates historical development as an evolutionary networking process. According to his views ideas develop during a selection process which can be reconstructed by the investigation of connections between actors, artefacts and concepts.

His main fields of research include the connection between biology and medicine around 1900, the history of diagnostic thinking during modernity, the history and ethics of modern psychiatry and neurology and the role of medical associations during the National Socialist regime. He (co-)authored and (co-)edited more than 200 research articles and books..

He was president of the European Association for the History of Medicine and Health (2013–2015) and president of the (German) Society for the History of Science (Gesellschaft für Wissenschaftsgeschichte). Under his presidency the Society for the History of Science united with the Deutsche Gesellschaft für Geschichte der Medizin, Naturwissenschaft und Technik e.V. to form a unified German Association for the History of the Sciences, Medicine and Technology.

Heiner Fangerau is co-editor of the Medizinhistorische Journal, the Journal of the History of Medicine and Allied Sciences and the European Journal for the History of Medicine and Health.

== Awards ==
In 2014 Heiner Fangerau was granted an honorary degree of the Carol Davila University of Medicine and Pharmacy in Bucharest.

In 2017 he was elected member of the German National Academy of Sciences Leopoldina.
