= BIG-NSE =

Graduate school of Technische Universität Berlin

The Berlin Graduate School of Natural Sciences and Engineering (BIG-NSE) is part of the Cluster of Excellence "Unifying Concepts in Catalysis" (UniCat) founded in November 2007 by Technische Universität Berlin and five further institutions in the Berlin area within the framework of the German government‘s Excellence Initiative.

The main research interest of the UniCat and BIG-NSE Faculty is Catalysis, in a broad sense. The research fields involved cover a broad range of topics, from natural sciences to engineering. The faculty consists of professors and junior researchers from 54 research groups at 6 participating institutions and active in 13 research fields, who will be intensively involved in the supervision and mentoring of the BIG-NSE students, among them the Fritz Haber Institute of the Max Planck Society, the working place of Professor Gerhard Ertl, the winner of the Nobel Prize in Chemistry 2007.

== Ph.D. Curriculum ==
The BIG-NSE offers a structured curriculum for obtaining the degree of "Doctor" within 3 years. The main characteristic of the BIG-NSE is a comprehensive integration and mentoring programme for its students, especially foreign students. It includes:

- An "Initial Phase", with intensive support, especially for administrative and integration aspects. Preparation of a schedule by the students themselves during the first semester.
- Continuous supervision by two professors/senior scientists and one mentor.
- Regular evaluation of the students’ work/study achievements.
- Continuous support for all professional and social aspects.
- Regular lectures presented by guest scientists from all over the world.
- Language and soft skill courses.
- Financial support for scientific and teaching materials.

== Entry Requirements ==
The entry requirements for the BIG-NSE are:

- A Master‘s degree or German Diploma in chemistry, biology, physics or engineering.
- A Certificate of English Proficiency (TOEFL with a minimum of 550 - paper-based version, or equivalent) for applicants whose native language is neither English nor German.
- Two letters of recommendation.

== See also ==
- Cluster of Excellence Unifying Systems in Catalysis (UniSysCat) (follow-up project of Unifying Concepts in Catalysis (UniCat))
- Technische Universität Berlin
- Free University Berlin (Freie Universität Berlin)
- Humboldt University of Berlin (Humboldt Universität zu Berlin)
- University of Potsdam (Universität Potsdam)
- Fritz Haber Institute of the MPG (Fritz-Haber-Institut der Max-Planck-Gesellschaft)
- Max Planck Institute for Colloids and Interfaces (Max-Planck-Institut für Kolloid- und Grenzflächenforschung)
