= The Quest (Corvallis, Oregon) =

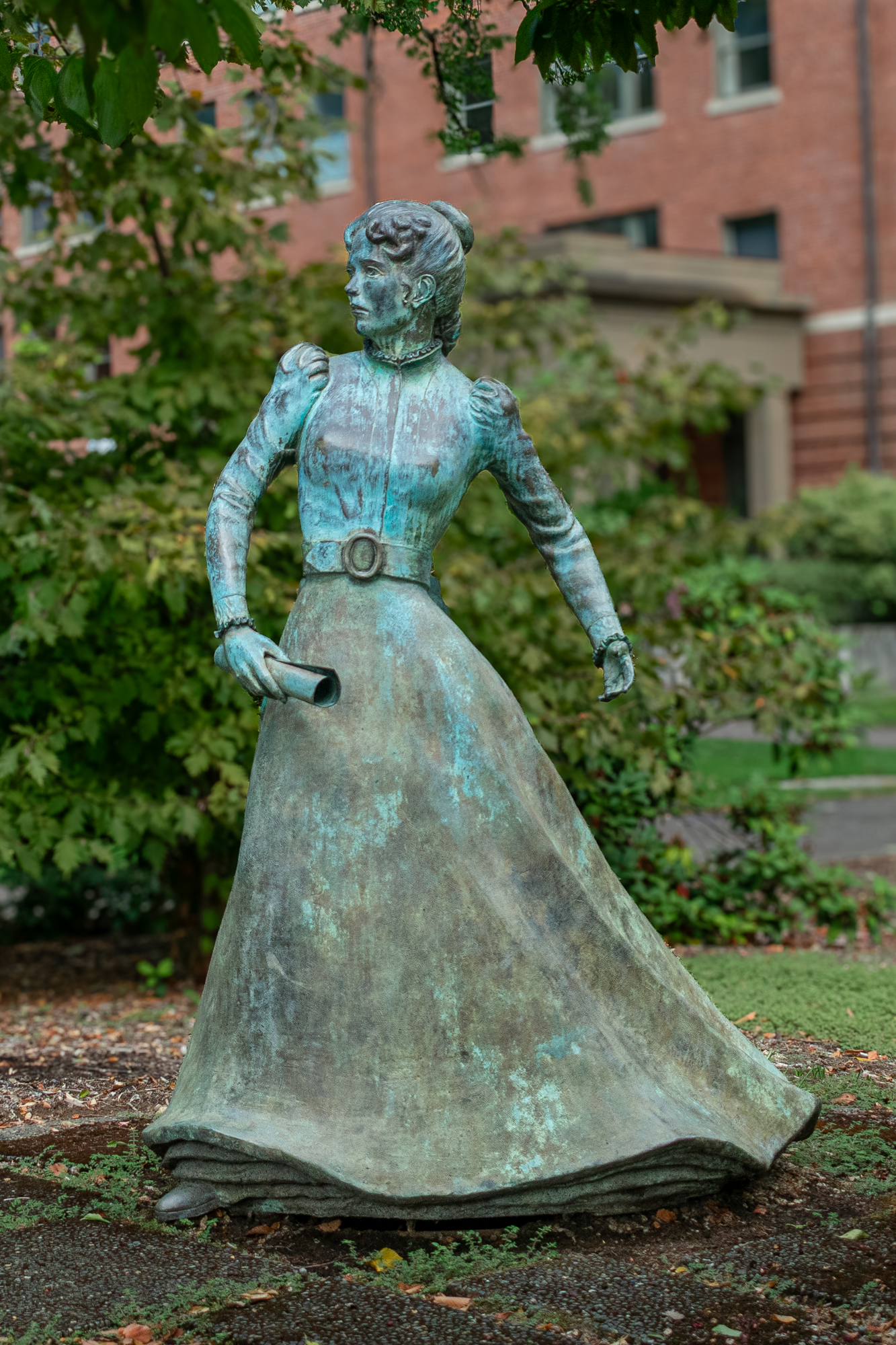
- Artist: Kirk St. Maur
- Year: 1983
- Type: Sculpture
- Medium: Bronze
- Subject: Alice Biddle
- Condition: "Treatment needed" (1993)
- Location: Corvallis, Oregon, United States; 44.56535°N 123.27782°W
- Owner: Oregon State University

The Quest is an outdoor 1983 sculpture of Alice Biddle by Kirk St. Maur, installed on the Oregon State University campus in Corvallis, Oregon, in the United States.

== Description and history ==
Kirk St. Maur's The Quest (1983) is an outdoor sculpture of Alice Biddle, the first female Oregon State University graduate, installed near Memorial Union. The bronze statue measures approximately 5 feet 11 inches (1.80 m) x 4 feet (1.2 m) x 4 feet 6 inches (1.37 m). The Smithsonian Institution's "Save Outdoor Sculpture!" description reads in part, "The figure is standing and her head is turned to the proper right. In her proper right hand, she holds a piece of rolled-up paper depicted in bronze. Both arms are slightly held out from her sides."

An inscription on the back of her skirt includes a signed inscription of the artist's name, a copyright symbol, and year of completion. Another inscription on a nearby marker reads, Kirk St. Maur 1983 / THE QUEST bronze / The Quest symbolizes ALICE E. BIDDLE, who in 1870 / became the first woman to graduate from what is now / Oregon State University. It reflects the energy, dedication and strength of all students in the pursuit of learning. / This work made possible / by Oregon's Art in Public Places program.

The sculpture was commissioned by the Oregon Arts Commission as part of its 1% for Art in State Buildings program. It was surveyed and deemed "treatment needed" by Smithsonian's "Save Outdoor Sculpture!" program in March 1993. The Quest is administered by Oregon State University.

== See also ==
- 1983 in art
