= Franz Josef Radermacher =

German mathematician and economist

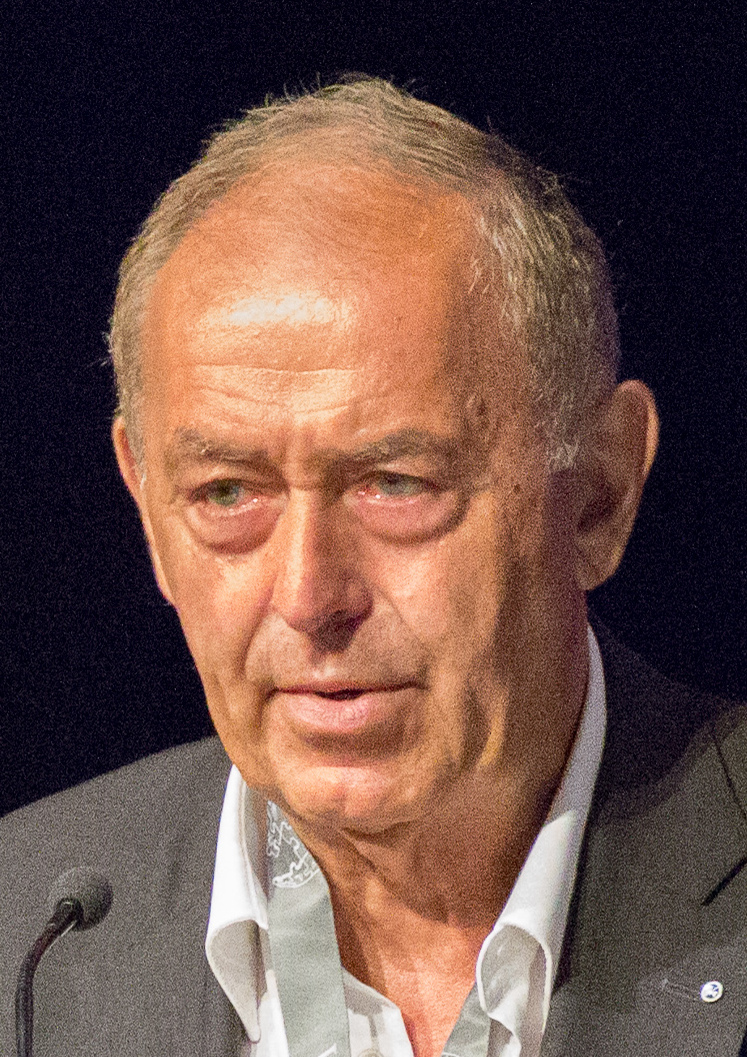
Franz Josef Radermacher (2016).

Franz Josef Radermacher (born 20 March 1950) is a German mathematician and economist. He is Professor of Informatics at Ulm University. He is one of the co-founders of the Global Marshall Plan Initiative that suggests a socio-ecological plan to eradicate poverty, increasing global wealth while protecting natural resources.

== Scientific career ==
Radermacher earned a PhD in Mathematics from RWTH Aachen in 1974. He earned a second PhD in Economics from the University of Karlsruhe in 1976. From 1983 till 1987, Radermacher was Professor for Applied Computer Science at the University of Passau. Since 1987 he is Professor for Artificial Intelligence and Databases at the University of Ulm. From 1988 till 1992 he was the president of the Society for Mathematics, Economics and Operations Research. Radermacher is an authority in the fields of globalization, innovation, overpopulation and global sustainable development.

== Awards ==
He was awarded the Planetary Consciousness Prize in 2004 by the Club of Budapest.

== Publications ==
- FJ Radermacher: The Importance of Metaknowledge for Environmental Information Systems, Proceedings of the Second International Symposium on Advances in Spatial Databases
- RH Möhring, R Müller and FJ Radermacher: Advanced DSS for scheduling: software engineering aspects and the role of Eigenmodels, Annals of Operations Research
- RH Mohring, FJ Radermacher: Introduction to stochastic scheduling problems, Contributions to operations research
- R Kalakota, FJ Radermacher: Electronic commerce: building blocks of new business opportunity, Journal of Organizational Computing and Electronic Commerce
- M Bartusch, RH Mohring, FJ Radermacher: M-Machine Unit Time Scheduling: A Report on Ongoing Research, Lecture notes in economics and mathematical systems
- O Günther, FJ Radermacher, WF Riekert: Environmental monitoring: Models, methods, and systems, Environmental Informatics
- FJ Radermacher: Global Marshall Plan:: a Planetary Contract, [globalmarshallplan.org Global Marshall Plan]
- T Schauer, FJ Radermacher: The Challenge of the Digital Divide: Promoting a Global Society Dialogue, University of Ulm Publishing Group
- FJ Radermacher, B Beyers: All in! Energy und Prosperity for a Growing World, Murmann Publishing Company
