= Sarah Straub =

German musician and psychologist

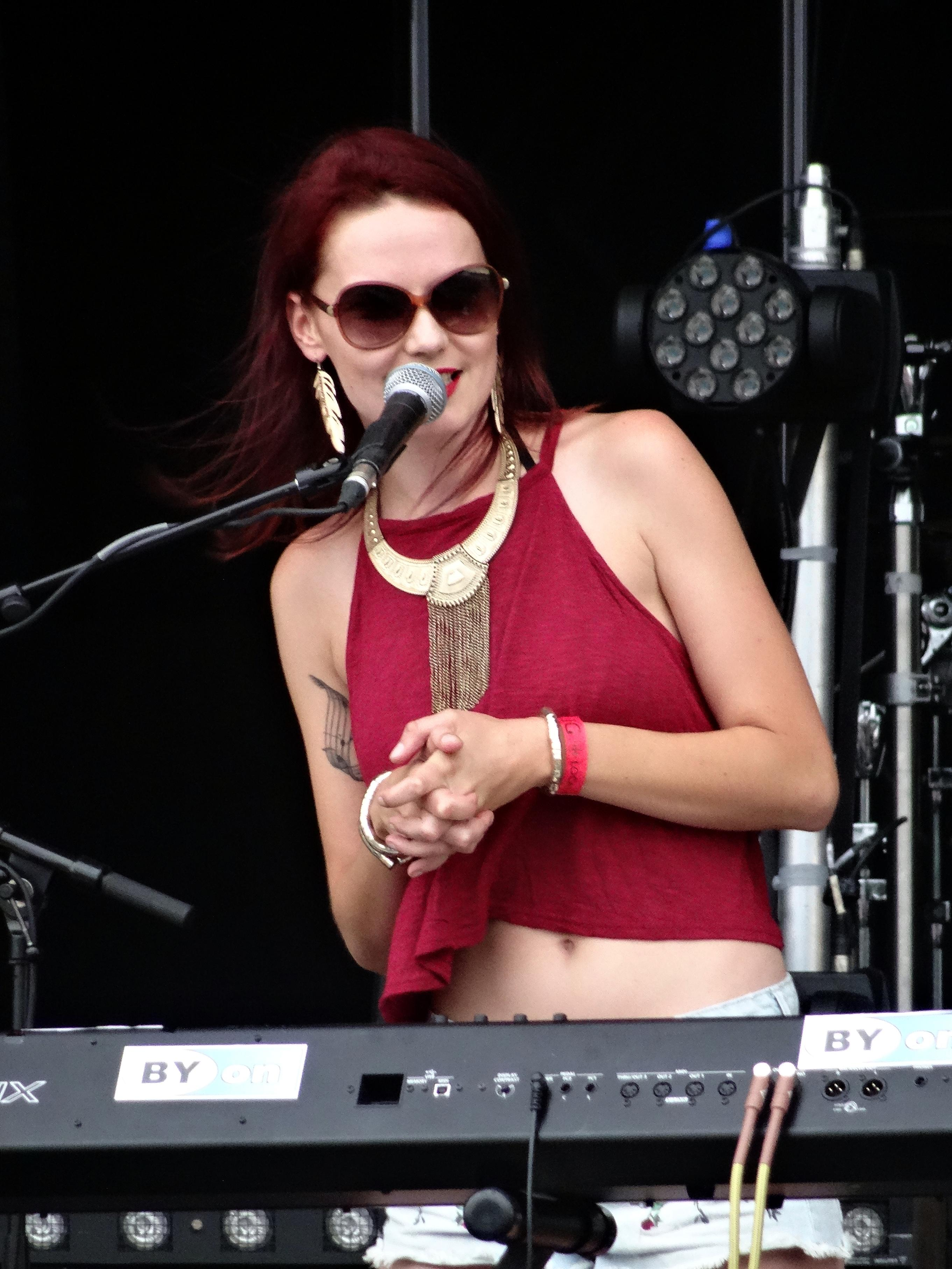
Straub live in Mühldorf 2015

Sarah Straub (born Lauingen a.d.Donau, 1 July 1986), married name Anderl-Straub, is a German singer, songwriter, musician, and psychologist. From a family of musicians, she followed in the footsteps of her father Helmut, a conductor and instrument teacher. At the age of six, she began playing the piano, then from the age of eight she studied clarinet and saxophone. At the age of twelve, Straub wrote her first songs. She was educated at St. Bonaventura Gymnasium in Dillingen a.d. Donau, a diocesan high school in the Franciscan tradition. From there she continued her studies at the University of Regensburg, graduating with a bachelor's degree in Psychology in 2011, obtaining her doctorate in 2015 from the University of Ulm.

== Music ==
As a singer-songwriter, supported by guest musicians, for about six years she mainly performed solo. For her debut album Say What You're Missing released in 2011, she searched an individual line up for the style of music for each song. She presented the album with its rock, pop, jazz and soul elements in June 2011 as part of a sold-out concert in the Dillinger Stadhalle, the city's multi-purpose indoor arena and convention center. Straub's musical breakthrough came with her first professional album Red, which was released on 30 May 2014 and was funded in 2014 by the Initiative Music, the German government funding agency that provides grants to the rock, pop, and jazz industry; and BY-on, a Bavarian government financed program for pop and rock musicians. The album was produced by Adrian Winkler and Uli Fiedler of Leider Fett. Among the studio musicians were Jörg Hartl from La Brass Banda and Daniel Mark Eberhard. Songs from the album ran several times on Bayern 3 and other radio stations. Throughout Germany, the media became aware of the upcoming artist and in December 2014 she received three German Rock & Pop Awards.

As part of her Red tour, Straub played over 150 concerts in Germany, Austria and Italy. In 2015 she appeared as support for Lionel Richie UNHEILIG, Spandau Ballet, Gentleman, and Joe Cocker. Straub sings together with former Toto singer Bobby Kimball on the Siggi Schwarz 2015 CD Milestones of Rock . In June 2014 she made her first television appearance in the Abendschau the evening show on de:Bayerischen Fernsehen, the Bavarian television network. In addition to her own headlining tour, she also gave several live concerts in 2015 together with her cellist Deborah Finck and the Vivid Curls. As a pianist, Straub presents digital pianos and synthesizers for YAMAHA Music Europe.

== Psychology ==
From 2005 to 2010 as a scholarship holder of the Studienstiftung des deutschen Volkes, she studied psychology at the University of Regensburg. She lives in Gundelfingen on the Danube and is employed as a psychologist in the Department of Neurology of the University Clinic Ulm. Straub obtained her PhD from the University of Ulm in July 2015. Her doctoral thesis entitled Die Einschätzung von Vertrauenswürdigkeit und der persönliche Raum bei der Verhaltensvariante der frontotemporalen Demenz researched a form of dementia.

== Discography ==
Albums

- 2011: Say What You’re Missing (CreativeJam)
- 2014: Red (Donnerwetter Musik/Cargo)
- 2017: Love Is Quiet (Pastel Pink Records)

Singles/EPs

- 2014: Red (Donnerwetter Musik/Cargo)
- 2014: Pieces (Donnerwetter Musik/Cargo)
- 2015: Let You Go (Bonus-Track: Moving Mountains feat. Siggi Schwarz)
- 2017: Do You Mean Yes (Pastel Pink Records)

Other

- 2012: My Own Tragedy on Moodorama vs.
- 2015: Siggi Schwarz CD Milestones Of Rock. (Schwarz Music & Schickle – 234030)
