= Elisabeth Kalko =

German tropical scientist and ecologist (1962–2011)

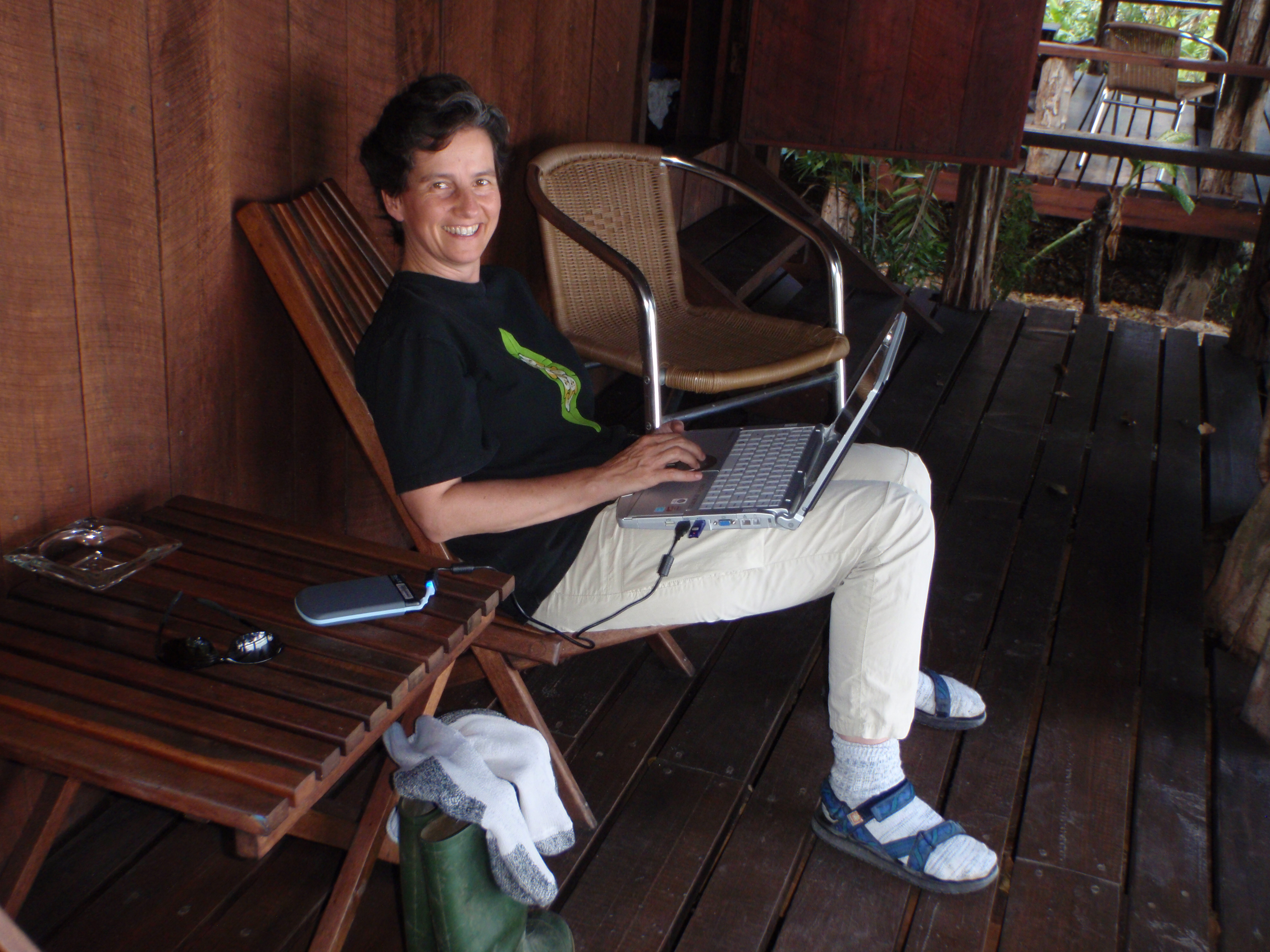
- Kalko in Belize, 2010
- Born: 10 April 1962
- Died: 26 September 2011 (aged 49)
- Occupations: Tropical scientist; ecologist

Academic background
- Education: University of Tübingen

Elisabeth Klara Viktoria Kalko (10 April 1962 – 26 September 2011 in Berlin) was a German tropical scientist and ecologist working at the Smithsonian Institution and the University of Ulm.

== Life ==
Elisabeth Kalko grew up in the Heilbron area and studied biology up from 1981 at University of Tübingen, Germany and graduated with a diploma. She gained a doctorate (Ph.D.) in 1991. The topic of her Ph.D. thesis was The ecolocation and hunting behaviour of three European dwarf bat species Pipistrellus pipistrellus (Schreber, 1774), Pipistrellus nathuslii (Keyserling et Blasius, 1839) and Pipistrellus kuhli (Kuhl, 1819), in the wild. Her doctoral studies were conducted as fellow of the National Merit Foundation ('Studienstiftung', 1984–1987, 1988–1990). From 1991 to 1993, Kalko held a NATO post-doctoral fellowship for research at the National Museum of Natural History, Smithsonian Institution, Washington, D. C. (USA) and at the Smithsonian Tropical Research Institute, Panama. From 1993 to 1997, she worked on the DFG programs 'Mechanism maintaining tropical diversity' (research group) and 'Diversity, structure and dynamics of neotropical bats' and held a DFG Heisenberg fellowship from 1997 to 1999. The fellowship was completed in 1999 in Tübingen.

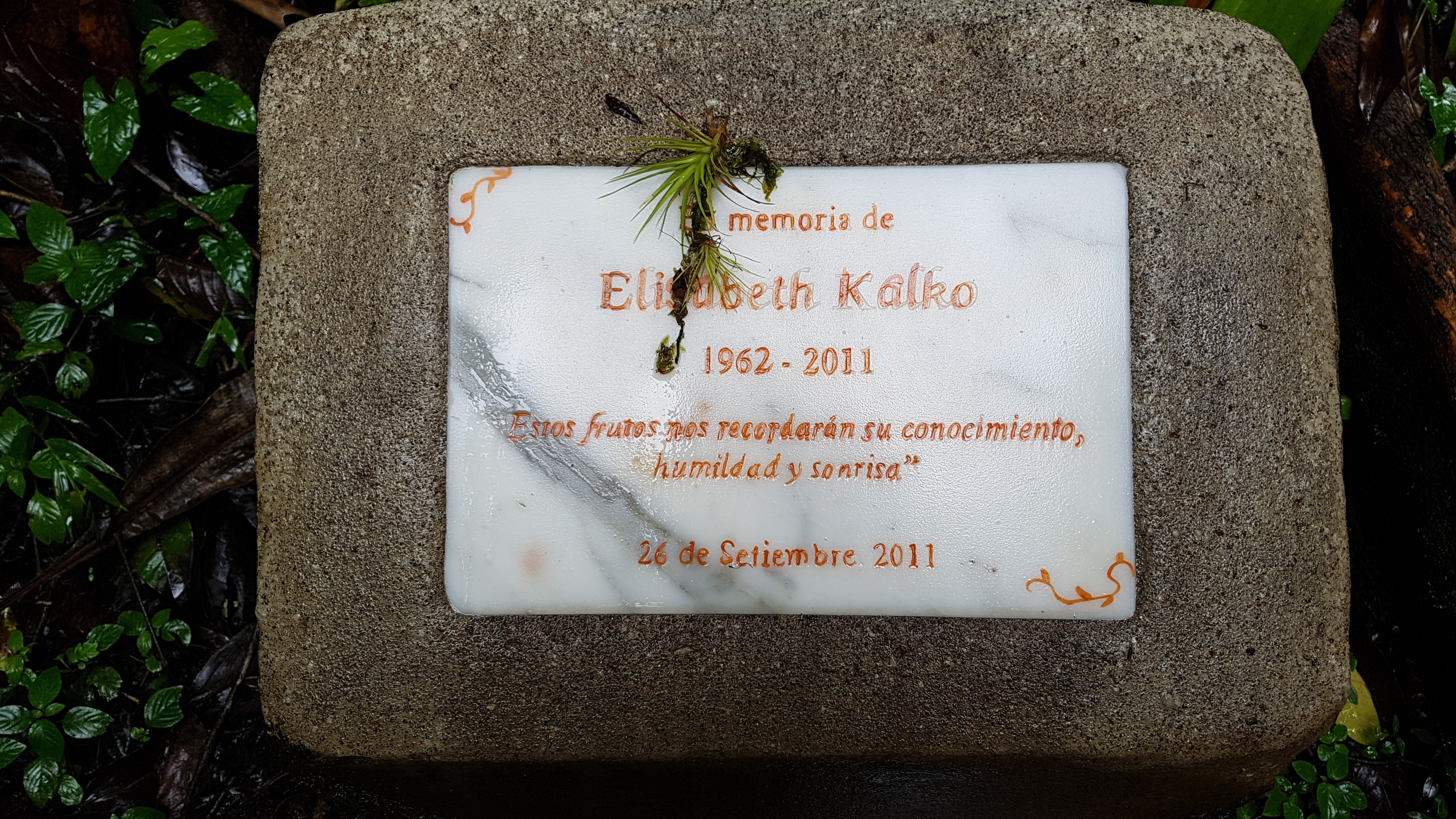
Memorial plaque in La Tirimbina Wildlife Refuge, Costa Rica

In 1999, Kalko was appointed staff scientist at the Smithsonian Tropical Research Institute in Panama. She spent considerable time on expeditions and at scientific institutions in the US, including National Museum of Natural History in Washington, D.C., in the Congo and many other countries. Beginning in 2000, Kalko held a joint appointment not only at STRI but also as director and full professor at the Institute of Experimental Ecology at the University of Ulm in Germany. Her scientific team included a leading German entomologist, Heiko Bellmann. She also maintained relations with the American Museum of Natural History (AMNH) as a Research Associate.

Kalko was a member of the German National Committee on Global Change Research (2002–2011), and was elected for life to the Heidelberg Academy of Sciences (2006). From 2005 to 2011, she was vice-president of the Society of Tropical Ecology (GTOE), and from 2008 on she was a member of the Senate Commission on Biodiversity of the German Research Foundation (DFG). The same year, Kalko became Head Elect of DIVERSITAS Germany. As editor-in-chief of the international tropical ecology journal Ecotropica, she strengthened the journal's profile considerably. During the early 2000s, she was a prominent expert in the areas of bat community ecology, echolocation and bat behaviour.

Kalko died during a visit in Tanzania on 26 September 2011. The cause of her death is unknown.

== Research ==
Kalko's research highlighted the importance of bats for maintenance of tropical forests and revealed that ecolocation signal intensity has been a largely underestimated aspect in echolocation research (links below). Kalko initiated and led a series of German Research Foundation (DFG) projects into tropical bat ecology, biodiversity and zoonoses on all continents, and spearheaded EU-funded research in bioacoustics.
