= Questing (disambiguation) =

Questing is an outdoor locating game.

Questing may also refer to:

- Questing (horse), a racehorse
- Questing (New Marlborough, Massachusetts), an open space preserve and historic site
- Questing Beast (also known as "The Questing"), a mythological creature of Arthurian legends
