= Qwest (disambiguation) =

- Qwest or Qwest Communications International, Inc. is a former US telecommunications carrier purchased by CenturyLink in 2011.

Qwest may refer to:

- Qwest Corporation, the single Bell Operating Company of CenturyLink
- Qwest Arena, former name of an arena in Idaho that is home to the Idaho Steelheads and the Idaho Stampede
- Qwest Center Omaha, former name an arena in Omaha that is home to the Creighton Bluejays and the UNO Mavericks
- Qwest Field, former name a stadium in Seattle home to the Seattle Seahawks and Seattle Sounders
- Qwest Records, a record label founded by Quincy Jones in 1980

== See also ==
- Quest (disambiguation)
