= Berlin Mathematical School =

German joint graduate school

Coordinates: 52.5122°N 13.3242°E

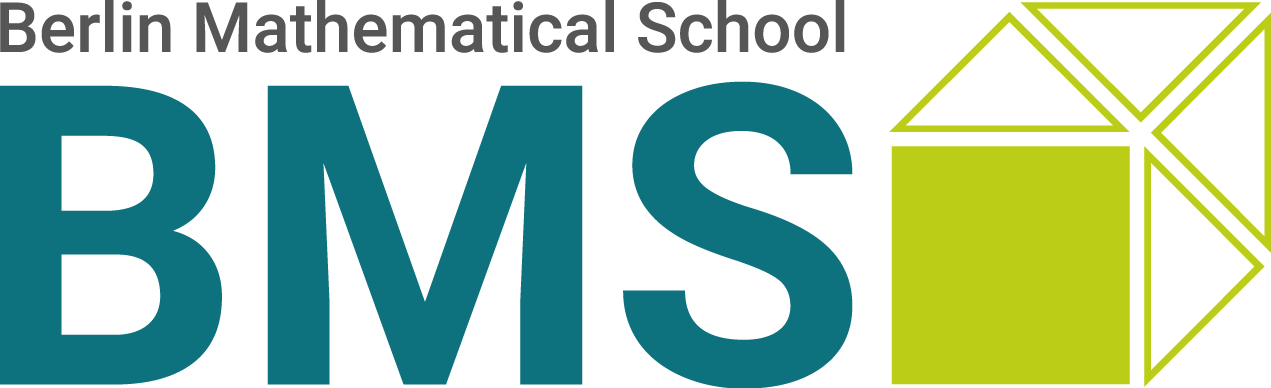
- Established: 2006
- Affiliations: Freie Universität Berlin; Humboldt-Universität zu Berlin; Technische Universität Berlin
- Provost: John M. Sullivan
- Students: ca. 230
- Location: Berlin, Germany
- Website: www.math-berlin.de

The Berlin Mathematical School (BMS) is a joint graduate school of the three renowned mathematics departments of the public research universities in Berlin: Freie Universität Berlin, Humboldt-Universität zu Berlin, and Technische Universität Berlin. In October 2006, the BMS was awarded one of the 18 prestigious graduate school awards by the Excellence Initiative of the German Federal Government for its innovative concept, its strong cross-disciplinary focus, and its outstanding teaching schedule tailored to the needs of students in an international environment. This was reconfirmed in June 2012 when the German Research Foundation announced that the BMS would also receive funding for a second period until 2017. Since 2019, the BMS is the graduate school in the Cluster of Excellence MATH+, which is funded by the Excellence Strategy. The BMS Chair is Jürg Kramer (HU), and the deputy Chairs are John M. Sullivan (TU) and Holger Reich (FU).

== Cooperation ==
BMS students enjoy access to exclusive seminars, workshops and lectures in English not only at the participating universities, but also at their academic partners:

- the Research Training Groups (RTG)
- the International Max Planck Research Schools (IMPRS)
- the Zuse Institute Berlin (ZIB)
- the Weierstrass Institute for Applied Analysis and Stochastics (WIAS)

or the DFG Collaborative Research Centers:

- Discretization in Geometry (SFB 109)
- Scaling Cascades in Complex Systems (SFB 1114).

== PhD in Mathematics at the BMS ==
The BMS PhD study program guides a student with a bachelor's degree through a structured course program, an oral qualifying exam, then directly to a doctoral degree in four to five years.

Phase I is the first part of the program and includes a lecture program created specifically for the BMS and coordinated among the three universities. Applicants who hold a bachelor's degree, Vordiplom, or equivalent can apply for Phase I of the BMS. Each semester, seven to ten Basic Courses are offered in English. During Phase I, every BMS student should complete at least five Basic Courses, plus two Advanced Courses (including one seminar) within three to four semesters. At the end of Phase I the Qualifying Exam takes place: an oral exam which is mandatory for admission to the research phase. Phase I students have a BMS faculty member as a mentor, who is assigned by the Admissions Committee. The Phase I mentor guides the student for the entire duration of Phase I, through the BMS Qualifying Exam until the start of Phase II.

Phase II is the research phase of the BMS PhD program and, to apply, students are expected to have a master's degree and meet the regular admission requirements of the Berlin universities' PhD programs. Each student is registered as a PhD student at one of the three universities and are expected to finish Phase II within four to six semesters. Phase II students have a thesis supervisor who provides support in all aspects of the PhD thesis, and gives advice on choosing the right conferences and publishing articles. In addition, Phase II students also have a separate mentor who can assist them in forming a career plan and in establishing a professional network.

== MATH+ Fridays ==
The BMS Friday is a colloquium which takes place fortnightly at the BMS Loft in the Urania in Berlin during the lecture period. The BMS welcomes and invites scholars in mathematics. BMS Fridays also include "What is...?"-seminars organised by students and offers "tea and cookies" before each talk.
