= Bonn-Cologne Graduate School of Physics and Astronomy =

School of Bonn and Cologne universities

- Other names: BCGS
- Type: Graduate School
- Established: 2006
- Affiliations: Universities of Bonn and Cologne
- Academic staff: >70
- Students: ~200
- Website: www.gradschool.physics.uni-bonn.de or www.gradschool.physics.uni-koeln.de

The Bonn-Cologne Graduate School of Physics and Astronomy (BCGS) is a joint program of graduate studies between the universities of Bonn and Cologne. The program leads students with a bachelor's degree in physics (or related subject) to a master's degree. The most successful students then move on to doctoral studies, leading to a PhD. The M.Sc. and PhD programs are offered in both physics and astrophysics.

The BCGS provides mentoring and research internships, scholarships, travel funds, and a research environment. In 2007, it was selected for funding by the Deutsche Forschungsgemeinschaft as part of the excellence initiative.

== Studies ==
The BCGS is open to excellent students from all over the world after the completion of their bachelor's degree for a master's course and then, potentially, a PhD. Students already holding a master's degree can join directly for a PhD. In BCGS, the transition from master's to PhD studies is intended to be seamless for the most successful students, although two separate degrees are awarded.

Within the BCGS scholarship program, the BCGS offers full scholarships for about 20 master's students per year. The scholarships are awarded on a competitive basis, wherein all applications under the scholarship program are evaluated by professors from both universities.

=== Lectures ===
The BCGS allows students to attend courses in Cologne and Bonn. To facilitate this, some lectures are additionally transmitted as video conferences. Furthermore, Bonn and Cologne are less than half an hour apart by public transportation, so also in-person attendance at both universities is possible.

The two-year M.Sc. courses are modularly structured and comprise lecture and lab courses and thesis work. The language of instruction is English. During their entire studies, each student is mentored by a professor.

In addition, intensive weeks take place outside of the regular lecture period. Here, students and lecturers spend one week working full-time on a specific topic.

== Research ==
The Departments of Physics and Astronomy at Bonn and Cologne focus on different research areas; between them, they span almost the full range of modern physics, from astrophysics, biophysics, and condensed matter research to particle physics, quantum optics, and string theory.

Both departments are also engaged in ongoing collaborations with international research groups worldwide. There exist research links and collaborations both in nuclear and hadron physics and in condensed matter physics with the Forschungszentrum Jülich and in astronomy/astrophysics with the Max-Planck Institute for Radio Astronomy.

== Student engagement and events ==
During the academic year, the BCGS has several fixed events. Usually, each event alternates between Bonn and Cologne.

Shortly after the start of the winter term in early autumn, the welcome meeting introduces new students to the school. An invited speaker gives a talk about a current topic in physics.

A poster session in spring is an opportunity for more advanced students to present their research topics and results. The presenting students receive feedback and new stimuli for their work, and younger students can get an overview of the current research topics pursued at both universities.
