= QUEST (Cluster of Excellence) =

Collaborative research project in Germany

Centre for Quantum Engineering and Space-Time Research
- Type: Public
- Established: November 2007
- Endowment: 7 Mio. EUR on average per year
- Coordinator: Wolfgang Ertmer (speaker), Karsten Danzmann (deputy speaker)
- Academic staff: circa 220 / 94 financed by QUEST
- Location: Hannover/Germany
- Website: www.questhannover.de

The Cluster of Excellence QUEST - Centre for Quantum Engineering and Space-Time Research has been funded since November 2007 in the framework of the German Universities Excellence Initiative of the federal and state governments of Germany. The key research areas of the cluster are the quantum engineering and the space-time research. The Cluster of Excellence is with scientists from the fields of quantum optics, laser physics, solid state physics, gravitational physics, theoretical physics and geodesy interdisciplinary orientated. Involved are institutes of Leibniz University Hannover and several partner institutions. Speaker of the Excellence Cluster is Wolfgang Ertmer, Deputy Spokesman is Karsten Danzmann.

== Research ==
In the cluster quantum effects for the production of new measurement technologies are being explored. It is working on new concepts that should improve accuracy by targeted use of these quantum effects . Examples are stable and accurate laser systems, tailored optical technologies, special forms of light (squeezed light) and atom interferometers. These technologies are among others used directly in the GEO 600 gravitational wave detector to increase sensitivity. In addition, the technology is also suitable for use in surveying projects, such as for future gravity field satellite missions.

The cluster is involved in the development and production of stable and highly accurate (optical) clocks, in particular of portable clocks for the use in space. These clocks are required for applications in precision geodesy such as the GNSS (Global Navigation Satellite System) and for highly accurate measurements of Earth's gravity.

The newly developed technologies should be used for measurements, which shall answer the fundamental questions of theoretical physics of time and space. More specifically, it is about - among other things - the connection between quantum mechanics and gravitation, the test of whether the fundamental constants really constant, and the processes of the creation of the universe.

== Outline of the research focuses ==
The research of QUEST is structured into four research areas A-D:

- A: Quantum Engineering
- B: Quantum Sensors
- C: Space-Time Research
- D: Enabling Technologies

In addition to the research areas QUEST has set up the so-called task groups that function as interdisciplinary working group and process specific research projects as a cross-structures to the research areas:

- T: Task Groups

The structure is complemented by the field H, which includes the promotion of young scientists and gender equality:

- H: Human Resources

== Participating institutions ==
- Institutes of Leibniz University Hannover
  - Institute of Quantum Optics
  - Institute of Gravitational Physics
  - Institute of Theoretical Physics
  - Institute of Applied Mathematics
  - Institute of Geodesy
  - Institute of Solid State Physics
- Laser Zentrum Hannover e. V.
- Max-Planck Institute for Gravitational Physics (Albert Einstein Institute, Hannover)
- Gravitational wave detector GEO600
- Physikalisch-Technische Bundesanstalt, Braunschweig/Germany
- Center for Applied Space Technology and Microgravity (ZARM), Bremen/Germany

== Research building HiTec ==
In 2010, the Wissenschaftsrat recommended to build a new research building at Leibniz University Hannover: the Hannover Institute of Technology (HiTec). In the research building QUEST scientists will carry out basic research, applied research and technology development in the field of quantum physics and geodesy together under one roof. The approximately 29.5 million-euro research building is designed for a staff number of 100 to 120 people. It includes in addition to many especially for laser experiments planned laboratories three major equipments: a freefall simulator, a fiber-drawing system and an atomic fountain. The building was officially opened in July 2018.
