= Teen Titans season 4 =

Teen Titans
- Season 4
- Digital cover art
- Showrunner: Glen Murakami
- Starring: Greg Cipes; Scott Menville; Khary Payton; Tara Strong; Hynden Walch
- No. of episodes: 13

Release
- Original network: Cartoon Network
- Original release: January 17 – July 16, 2005

Season chronology
- ← Previous; Season 3 Next → Season 5

The fourth season of the animated television series Teen Titans, based on the DC comics series of the same name by Bob Haney and Bruno Premiani, originally aired on Cartoon Network in the United States. Developed by Glen Murakami, Sam Register, and television writer David Slack, the series was produced by DC Entertainment and Warner Bros. Animation. It stars Scott Menville, Hynden Walch, Khary Payton, Tara Strong, and Greg Cipes as the main characters.

The series focuses on a team of crime-fighting teenaged superheroes, consisting of the leader Robin, foreign alien princess Starfire, green shapeshifter Beast Boy, the dark sorceress Raven, and the technological genius Cyborg. The season focuses on Raven, whose destiny to be the key to the world's destruction causes secrets about her past to unravel and the return of her father and old enemy, Trigon.

The season premiered on January 15, 2005, and ran until July 16, broadcasting 13 episodes. The season marks the first time a Teen Titans season has never aired on Kids' WB. On its sister network, it was replaced full-time by The Batman (2004–08) and What's New, Scooby-Doo? (2002–06). Warner Bros. Home Video released the fourth season on DVD in the United States and Canada on November 20, 2007. Upon its release, the season received critical acclaim particularity for its main storyline and its level of maturity.

== Production ==
Season four of Teen Titans aired on Cartoon Network from January 15 to July 16, 2005. The season was produced by DC Entertainment and Warner Bros. Animation, executive produced by Sander Schwartz and produced by Glen Murakami, Bruce Timm and Linda M. Steiner. Staff directors for the series included Michael Chang, Heather Maxwell and Alex Soto. The episodes for the season were written by a team of writers, which consisted of Richard Elliott, Melody Fox, Rob Hoegee, Greg Klein, Thomas Pugsley, Simon Racioppa, David Slack, and Amy Wolfram. Producer Murakami worked with Derrick Wyatt, Brianne Drouhard, and Jon Suzuki on character design while Hakjoon Kang served as the background designer for the series. The season employed a number of storyboard artists, including Eric Canete, Colin Heck, Kalvin Lee, Keo Thongkham, Scooter Tidwell, Alan Wan and Matt Youngberg.

== Cast and characters ==
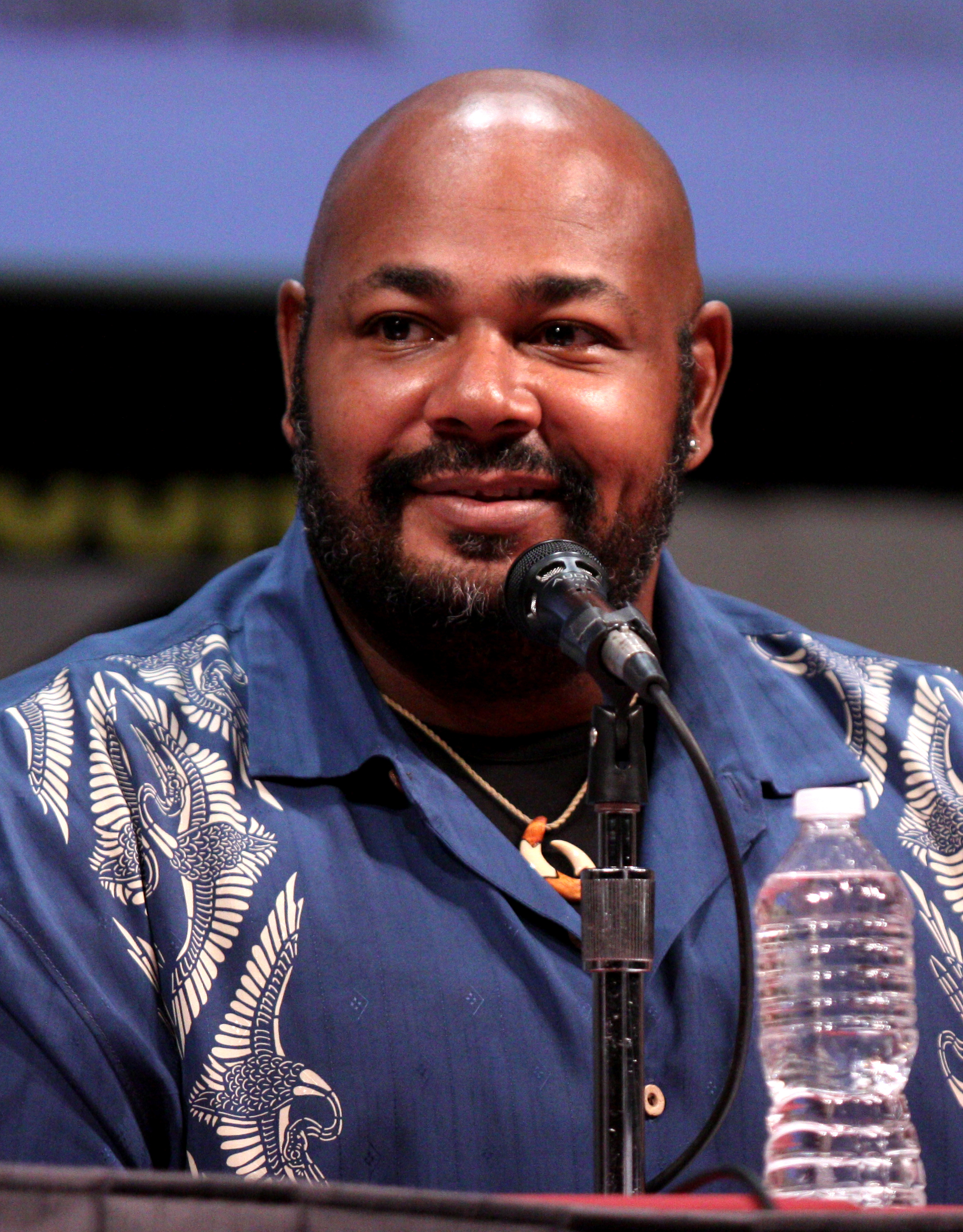
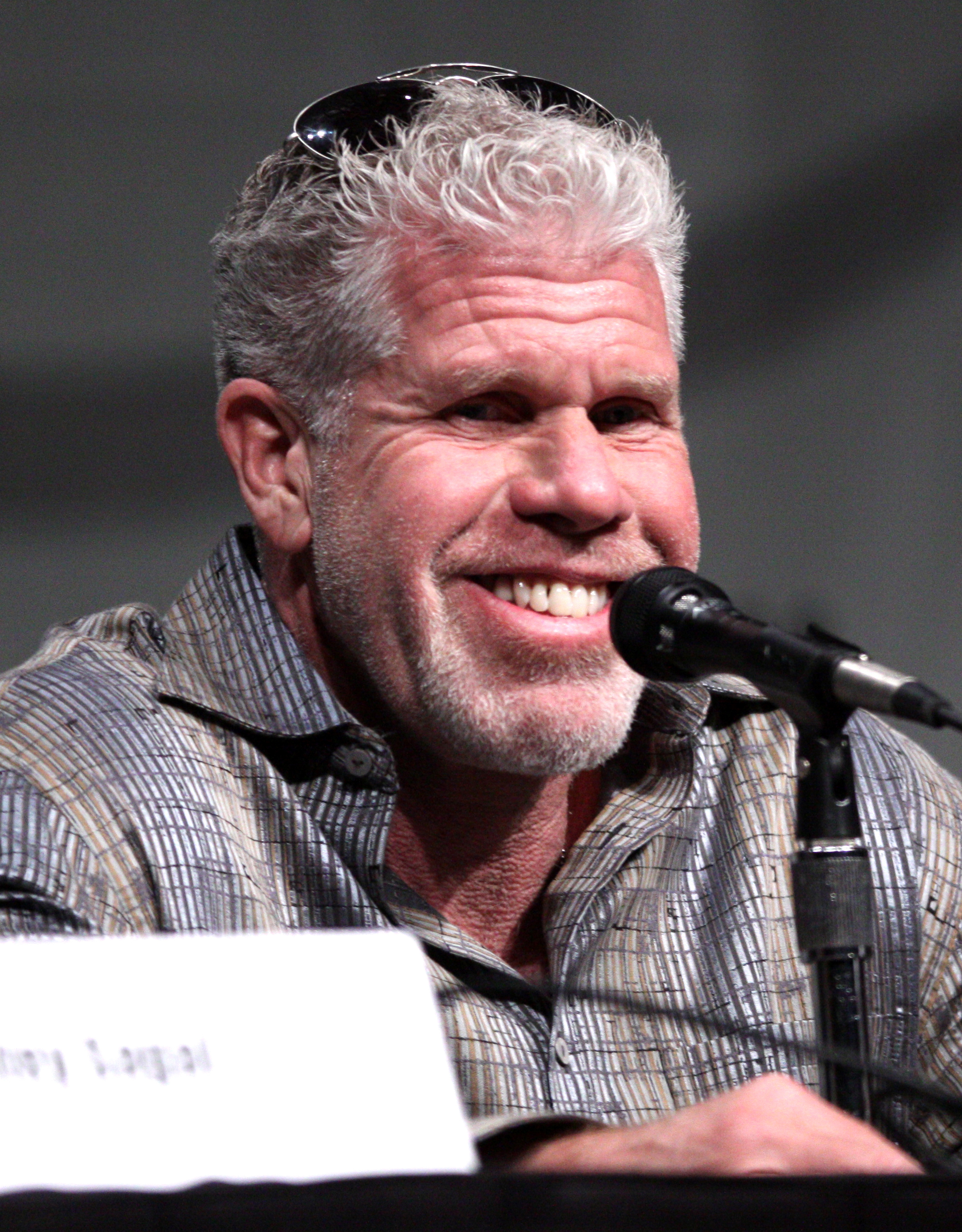
Veteran voice actors Kevin Michael Richardson (left) and Ron Perlman (right) recur in this season as the main villains Trigon and Slade.

The five voice actors for the main characters - Scott Menville, Hynden Walch, Greg Cipes, Tara Strong, and Khary Payton - reprise their roles in the fourth season as Robin, Starfire, Beast Boy, Raven, and Cyborg, respectively. Dee Bradley Baker recurs in the season, providing voices for several characters, including Space Monster in the episode "Stranded" and Plasmus in the episode "The End" Part 1. Kevin Michael Richardson returns to the series, providing the voice for Trigon, Raven's father and the season's main antagonist as well as voices for various roles, including The Bear and The Snake in the episode "The Quest" and reprises his role as Mammoth and See-More in the episode "Mother Mae-Eye". Ron Perlman reprised his role as Slade in the season.

Season four of Teen Titans featured numerous guest actors providing voices for recurring and guest characters. In the episode "Don't Touch That Dial", Alexander Polinsky reprises his role as the villain Control Freak. The episode also features the voices of Jeff Bennett, Rob Paulsen, and James Arnold Taylor for various roles. Veteran actors Takayo Fischer and Keone Young provided voices for the characters Chu-Hui, Katarou and The Monkey in the episode "The Quest". Rodger Bumpass reprised his role as the villain Doctor Light in the episode "Birthmark". The episode "Cyborg the Barbarian" features the vocal talents of Kimberly Brooks as Sarasim and Michael Clarke Duncan as both Krall and Hayden. The episode "Employee of the Month" featured Tom Kane voicing Beast Boy's boss Bob and Rob Paulsen voicing the villain The Source. In the episode "Troq", Stephen Root provides the voice of Val-Yor, an alien fighting a militia of robots while harboring hate towards Starfire and her race. The episode "The Prophecy" features Virginia Madsen voicing the character Arella. Jason Marsden played the villain Billy Numerous in the episode "Overdrive". In the episode "Mother Mae-Eye", Billie Hayes provided the voice for the villain Mother Mae-Eye while Lauren Tom provided voices for the characters Gizmo and Jinx.

== Reception ==
The fourth season of Teen Titans performed well on Cartoon Network. The episode "The Quest" garnered a high 4.1 rating in the Kids 9-14 demographic (1.03 million viewers). The episode "The Prophecy" garnered a 2.3 Nielsen rating in the Tweens 9-14 demographic (569,000 viewers) and a 2.0 in the Kids 6-11 demographic (482,000). The episode "The End (Part 1)" garnered a 3.1 Nielsen rating in the Tweens 9-14 demographic (755,000 viewers) and 2.7 rating in the Kids 6-11 demographic (662,000 viewers). The episodes airing in July average a 2.1 Nielsen rating in the Tweens 9-14 demographic (507,000 viewers).

The season received critical acclaim. Mac McEntire of DVD Verdict awarded the fourth season a score of 87, commending the writers for creating "smarter, deeper, and emotionally rich stories", highlighting Raven's story arc, and added that "the Terra storyline in Season Two showed that this series could handle bigger, more serious storylines. In Season Four, that's exactly what it delivers. For everyone who's waited for this show to grow up a little, this is the season in which that happens". John Sinnott, writing for DVD Talk, deemed the fourth season release as "Highly Recommended". Sinnott commented that "the show continues its run of strong shows in this season. There's a lot of action, a good amount of humor, and even a few touching scenes. A fun show that's guaranteed to bring out the comic geek in everyone". Randall Cyrenne of Animated Views was mixed in his review of the season, praising the variety of stories being told but found the stories either too comedic or too intense.

== Episodes ==
No. overall	No. in season	Title	Directed by	Written by	Original release date	Prod. code	U.S. viewers (millions)
40	1	"Episode 257-494 (a.k.a. Don't Touch That Dial)"	Heather Maxwell	David Slack	January 17, 2005	257–494	1.36
The Titans discover Control Freak is out of jail and in the television, hopping from channel to channel. Using the same device, The Titans get inside the television dimension and chase after Control Freak. The chase between the Titans and Control Freak, as well as his monsters, are causing damage to the viewers brain waves. Beast Boy, the couch potato of the group, leads the Titans in taking down Control Freak. Villain(s): Control Freak
41	2	"The Quest"	Heather Maxwell	Amy Wolfram	January 29, 2005	257–495	1.73
After losing a fight of martial arts with the villain Katarou, Robin travels to Asia to find the True Master to train him in martial arts. While there, he encounters an elderly woman who prepares him for his meeting with the True Master through a series of tasks. Once complete, Robin faces off against Katarou, who followed him there to steal his apprenticeship with the True Master. Robin, along with the woman who reveals herself as the True Master, defeats Katarou and begins training. While Robin is away, the other Titans try to fill in the gap left by Robin by trying out his clothes and gadgets. Villain(s): Katarou
42	3	"Birthmark"	Michael Chang	David Slack	February 5, 2005	257–496	N/A
Raven's birthday approaches, but she has no interest in celebrating it, wanting the day to pass. The Titans throw her a surprise birthday party, but Raven shuts it down, destroying the decorations. When the Titans respond to an alert, they face off against Slade, who has acquired new powers and has a message from Raven's father, foretelling her destiny. During the battle between Slade and the Titans, Raven stops time, with only her, Slade and Robin unaffected. Villain(s): Dr. Light, Slade, Trigon
43	4	"Cyborg the Barbarian"	Alex Soto	Richard Elliott & Simon Racioppa	February 12, 2005	257–497	0.90
Cyborg is accidentally thrown five thousand years into the past, and by coincidence comes to the aid of a young woman named Sarasim, whose tribe is under attack by a horde of creatures. While simultaneously becoming the tribe's savior, the battle wears out his batteries, and there is no place for him to recharge. Villain(s): Krall
44	5	"Employee of the Month"	Alex Soto	Rob Hoegee	February 19, 2005	257–498	N/A
Amidst a series of UFO raids on farms (with the targets being cows, to everyone's mystification), Beast Boy wants a moped but has no money to get one of his own. Robin won't buy him one and Cyborg won't build one, so he gets a job at Mega Meaty Meat, a restaurant which sells nothing but meat. Beast Boy manages to overcome his distaste for meat in order to get the job, but his workplace proves to be more than just a restaurant, which turns out to be the home of an evil alien tofu leader, known as Newfu, who threatens to destroy the earth. Villain(s): Newfu
45	6	"Troq"	Michael Chang	Amy Wolfram	May 9, 2005	257–499	0.94
Val-Yor, an alien, enlists the help of the Titans to fight an enemy of vicious-fighting machines called the Locrix. Despite his strength, courage and bravery, he displays a noticeable hatred for Starfire and other Tamaraneans, giving her the nickname "Troq", causing some discomfort among the team. Note: This is a special episode about racism. Villain(s): The Locrix
46	7	"The Prophecy"	Heather Maxwell	Greg Klein & Tom Pugsley	June 4, 2005	257–500	1.05
Raven has been hiding a dark secret, but her secret is putting her teammates in danger. Slade is after her again and still wants her to become the portal. She finds that she is unable to escape the prophecy of her birth and decides to tell the rest of team her secret: she is Trigon's daughter. Villain(s): Slade, Trigon
47	8	"Stranded"	Alex Soto	Melody Fox	June 11, 2005	257–501	N/A
When being attacked by an alien in outer space, the Titans inadvertently split the T-Ship apart. Stranded and separated on several different areas of an alien planet, the Titans must now find each other again. Beast Boy displays a bad hand in technological skills, even with simplified instructions from Cyborg, Raven is being followed around by small alien creatures, and Robin and Starfire must come to terms about their strong romantic feelings for each other. Villain(s): Shrieker the Space Monster
48	9	"Overdrive"	Michael Chang	David Slack	June 18, 2005	257–502	N/A
Cyborg installs a new computer chip into his circuits, greatly strengthening and increasing his speed and efficiency eight times over. When a multiplying metahuman, Billy Numerous, appears on the scene, Cyborg may give up a lot to try and catch him. Villain(s): Billy Numerous, Adonis
49	10	"Mother Mae-Eye"	Heather Maxwell	David Slack	June 25, 2005	257–503	1.23
Summoned through an enchanted pie delivered to the Tower, Mother Mae-Eye manages to induce mind-control over all the Titans, mentally regressing them into obedient, sweet "children" who regard her as their mother. When Starfire is accidentally knocked out of the villain's mind-control during a mission against the H.I.V.E. Five, she realizes the truth behind Mother and attempts to bring her fellow Titans' minds back. Villain(s): H.I.V.E. Five (Gizmo, Jinx, Mammoth, See-More, Private HIVE), Mother Mae-Eye
50	11	"The End"	Alex Soto	Amy Wolfram	July 2, 2005	257–504	1.41
51	12	"The End"	Michael Chang	Rob Hoegee	July 9, 2005	257–505	1.02
52	13	"The End"	Heather Maxwell	David Slack	July 16, 2005	257–506	1.36
Part 1: The day Raven has feared has come and Raven does her best to make her final day with the Titans the best. When Slade comes to claim her, the rest of the Titans won't let go without a fight. Villain(s): Plasmus, Trigon, Slade Part 2: Raven and the Earth have been destroyed and Trigon takes over, casting Slade out with the rest of the Titans. With Raven's "farewell blessing" and the mystical ring of Azar, the rest of the Titans spread out to fight off Trigon while Slade and Robin search for Raven. Villain(s): Nega Starfire, Nega Cyborg, Nega Beast Boy (all 3 negative-selves), Slade, Trigon Part 3: Robin rescues a seven-year-old version of Raven, who has been stripped of both her powers and her memories, but still thinks she must hold the key to Trigon's defeat. Also down in Trigon's realm, Slade fights a demonic guard to regain his "flesh and blood". Meanwhile, the three other Titans are fighting for their lives against evil doppelgangers of themselves. The originals find that they are not successful trying to fight the darker and evil doppelgangers, so Starfire suggests that they switch opponents. They later re-join with Robin and a young Raven to face their strongest and most powerful enemy yet: Trigon the Terrible, and Raven's true power may not be all gone. Villain(s): Slade (temporary ally), Trigon, Nega Starfire, Nega Cyborg, Nega Beast Boy (all three negative-selves)

== DVD release ==
The DVD boxset was released on November 20, 2007, in the United States and Canada. It features a series title "Teen Titans: Know Your Foes", a featurette which is segmented for each of the series' main villains.

Teen Titans - The Complete Fourth Season
Set details	Special features
13 episodes; 2-disc set (DVD); 1.33:1 aspect ratio; Subtitles: English; Language: English (Stereo)	Featurettes; "Access Top-Secret Files from the Teen Titans: Know Your Foes Featurette Gallery"; Easter Eggs
DVD release date
United States	Canada
November 20, 2007
