= Integrative Production Technology for High-Wage Countries =

Interdisciplinary research project of RWTH Aachen University

Cluster of Excellence - Integrative Production Technology for High-Wage Countries
- Type: public
- Established: October 2006
- Provost: Christian Brecher (speaker of the board)
- Director: Matthias Brockmann (COO)
- Location: Aachen, NRW, Federal Republic of Germany
- Website: www.production-research.de
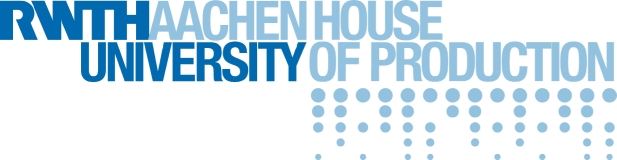

The Cluster of Excellence Integrative Production Technology for High-Wage Countries is an interdisciplinary research project of RWTH Aachen University combined in the “Aachen House of Integrative Production”. It pursues the long-term goal to increase the competitiveness of German manufacturing technology. The Cluster of Excellence was founded in October 2006 as part of the Excellence Initiative of the German Federal Ministry of Education and Research and the German Research Foundation. It was re-announced as a Cluster of Excellence on June 15, 2012.

== Goals ==
It is the goal to ensure the production in high-wage countries during the changing conditions of the globalization. Based on the Cluster of Excellence, theories are developed that combine economical, ecological, and social aspects for the producing industry with the help of necessary methods and equipment. The aim of the academic researchers is to contribute seminal and sustainable production technologies to help enterprises with the problems of the location. The Cluster of Excellence “Integrative Production Technology for High-Wage Countries” is aiming to maintain the competitive ability of German Production Technology.

== Research areas ==
Companies have to compete in an environment of increasing global competition. It has to be the concern of high-wage countries to evaluate and define the conditions under which domestic businesses can successfully develop and produce corresponding products. In order to meet the challenges, a fundamentally new understanding of product and production interrelations is required.
The Cluster of Excellence aims at developing a viable, production-scientific strategy and theory of production including necessary technology approaches. Various issues of individualisation, virtualisation and hybridisation of industrial production, self-optimisation are addressed, which are divided in four Integrative Cluster Domains (ICD).

=== ICD-A: Individualised Production ===
In contradiction to the incompatibility of economies of scale and economies of scope, manufacturing companies in high-wage countries are facing increasing challenges. This challenge corresponds to a resolution of the scale-scope-dichotomy. Product production systems have to be adjusted to one another regarding their specific degree of standardisation in order to resolve the dichotomy.
An integrated assessment model classifies product productions systems in four quantifiable fields of tension. Based on the model, the current operating point of a production system can be analysed. A configuration logic - derived from the results of the analysis - provides the means to control a production system's configuration process.

=== ICD-B: Virtual Production Systems ===
The planning of production processes is characterised by unlinked simulations of specific aspects, which are based on standard assumption. The impact of ustream production processes cannot be taken into account. To increase simulation quality, individual simulations have to be linked and combined to a simulation chain.
The Virtual Production Systems researches a method to link simulation resources, data sets and access rights to the generated integrative simulation platform. The general concept also contains subsequent analysis of simulation results by methods of visualisation.

=== ICD-C: Hybrid Production Systems ===
An important part in securing the competitiveness of industrial production is advancing the manufacturing processes as it currently pushes existing boundaries of manufacturing technologies and taps new fields of applications.
The issue of Hybridisation of manufacturing technologies is the systematic development and early assessment of possible application. The integration of knowledge of different disciplines of production engineering is crucial to its success.

=== ICD-D: Self-optimising Production Systems ===
Cognitive technologies can enable production systems to adapt self-optimizingly to variable conditions. The primary objective is to ensure product quality by aligning the considered process chain to the fulfillment of the required product features by designing inter-process control loops. Therefore the production system can dynamically permit deviations of other goals during the production process or compensate deviations by specific reactions and increase it flexibility and competitiveness.

== Research partner ==
More than 20 research institutes, 25 professors of engineering, materials, mathematics, economics, and psychology work with their research assistants in co-operation with the international industry.

=== Institutes ===
Institute	Director
ACCESS e.V.	Andreas Bührig-Polaczek
Research Institute for Operations Management	Günther Schuh
Foundry Institute and Chair of Foundry Engineering (GI)	Andreas Bührig-Polaczek
Institute and Chair of Surface Engineering	Kirsten Bobzin
Institute and Chair of Metal Forming	Gerhard Hirt
Institute of Plastics Processing, Chair of Plastics Processing	Christian Hopmann
Institute and Chair of Ferrous Metallurgy	Wolfgang Bleck
Chair and Institute of Industrial Engineering and Ergonomics	Christopher Schlick
Welding and Joining Institute, Chair for Welding and Joining Technologies	Uwe Reisgen
Institute for Textile Technology and Chair for Textile Machinery	Thomas Gries
CATS Chair for Computational Analysis of Technical Systems	Marek Behr
Department of Mechanism Theory and Dynamics of Machines (IGM)	Burkhard Corves
Center for Learning and Knowledge Management, Department of Information Management in Mechanical Engineering (ZLW-IMA)	Sabina Jeschke
SC Institut for Scientific Computing	Christian Bischof
Laboratory for Machine Tools and Production Engineering	Christian Brecher et al.
Fraunhofer Institute for Production Technology	Fritz Klocke et al.
Fraunhofer Institute for Laser Technology	Reinhart Poprawe
IfU Institut for Management Cybernetics e.V.	Sabina Jeschke
Lectureship and Research Field Rubber Technology	Edmund Haberstroh
Centre for Computing and Communication	Christian Bischof
Institute of Automatic Control	Dirk Abel
Chair of Business Administration and Sciences for Engineers and Natural Scientists	Malte Brettel
Institute for Geometry and Practical Mathematics	Wolfgang Dahmen
Technology and Innovation Management Group	Frank Piller
Human Technology Centre	Martina Ziefle

=== Industrial partners ===
Amongst others:

- BMW
- Carl Zeiss AG
- Daimler AG
- Dürr System GmbH Aircraft and Technology Systems
- EADS
- Festo AG & Co. KG
- Ford Forschungszentrum Aachen GmbH
- Freudenberg Simmerringe GmbH & Co. KG
- Georgsmarienhütte
- Kuka
- Robert Bosch GmbH
- TGE Vorwerk Elektrowerke GmbH & Co. KG
- ThyssenKrupp Steel AG
- Volkswagen Werkzeugbau Braunschweig

== Literature ==
- Brecher, Christian (Hrsg.): Integrative Produktionstechnik für Hochlohnländer, 1. Auflage, Springer Verlag, 2011
- Brecher, Christian (Ed.): Integrative Production Technology for High-Wage Countries, 1. Edition, Springer Verlag,2012
