= University of Ulm =

University in Germany

Ulm University
- Universität Ulm
- Motto: Sciendo – Docendo – Curando
- Type: Public
- Established: 1967; 59 years ago
- Affiliations: DFG, GUC, NUS
- Budget: € 393.6 million
- President: Michael Kühl
- Academic staff: 2,469
- Total staff: 3,879
- Students: 9,891 SS 2018
- Location: Ulm, Baden-Württemberg, Germany; 48°25′17″N 9°56′55″E
- Website: www.uni-ulm.de

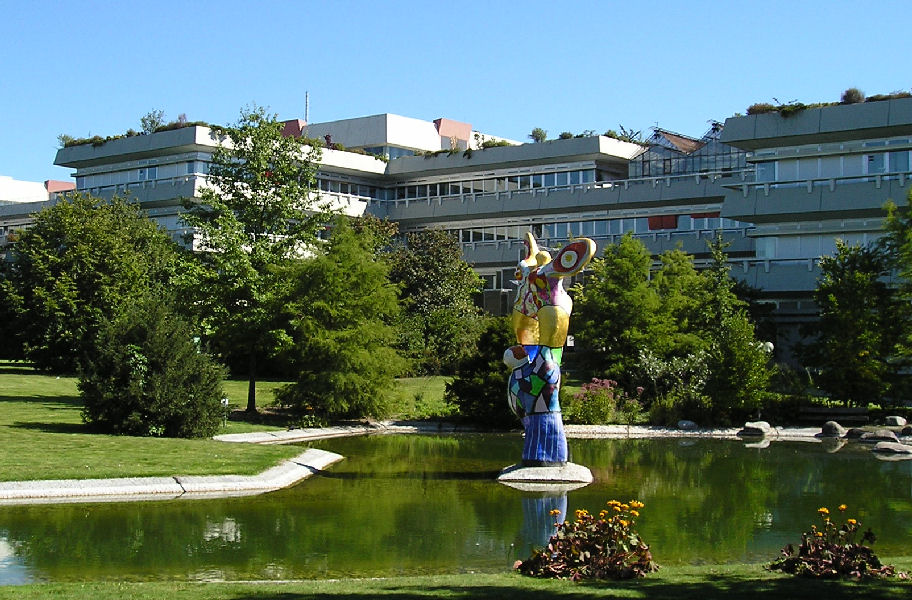
The main building of the Ulm University, in front Niki de Saint Phalle's "The Poet and His Muse" (1978)

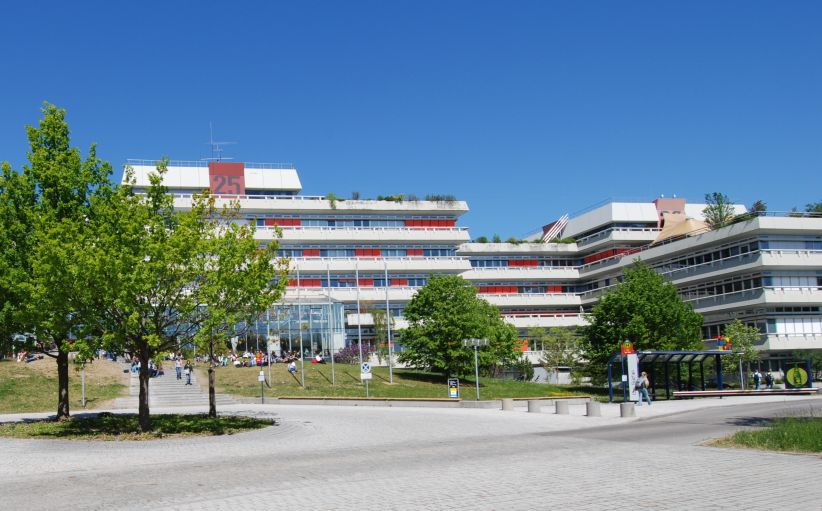
Main building from the south

Ulm University (German: Universität Ulm) is a public university in Ulm, Baden-Württemberg, Germany. The university was founded in 1967 and focuses on natural sciences, medicine, engineering sciences, mathematics, economics and computer science. With 9,891 students (summer semester 2018), it is one of the youngest public universities in Germany. The campus of the university is located north of the city on a hill called Oberer Eselsberg, while the university hospital has additional sites across the city.

== History ==
The university is the youngest public university in the state of Baden-Württemberg, which boasts several old, renowned universities in Heidelberg (founded in 1386), Freiburg (1457) and Tübingen (1477). The idea was to create a university with a new approach in both research and teaching. An important concept since the foundation of the university has always been to promote interdisciplinarity. In the decades following the foundation, the spectrum of subjects has steadily been extended, and the university has grown significantly.

An important step in combining the strength of industrial and academic research was the realization of the idea of a science park around the main university campus. Research centers of companies like Daimler, BMW, Siemens and in the past also Nokia and AEG, have been established at the site, in addition to institutes of the university focusing on applied research. Among other large research projects, the university features four Collaborative Research Centers (German: Sonderforschungsbereiche), which are established on a competitive basis by the German Research Foundation (Deutsche Forschungsgemeinschaft, DFG). Third-party funding of research reached 67.5 million euros in 2009.

In 1998, Ulm University introduced an International Masters program in English: M.Sc. in Communication Technology, which is the first of its kind in Germany. Since then, this program attracts students from different countries around the world. C-Tech Program has research collaboration with many renowned Universities around the world.

It also offers other English programs, namely M.Sc. and PhD in molecular medicine, M.Sc. in advanced materials, M.Sc. in energy science and technology, M.Sc. in finance, M.Sc. in biology and M.Sc. in advanced oncology, the latter being an extra-occupational program.

In 2003, the Ulm University was involved in founding a private university in Egypt, the German University in Cairo.

Since 2007, the university has been participating in the German Universities Excellence Initiative with the newly founded International Graduate School in Molecular Medicine Ulm.

=== Name ===
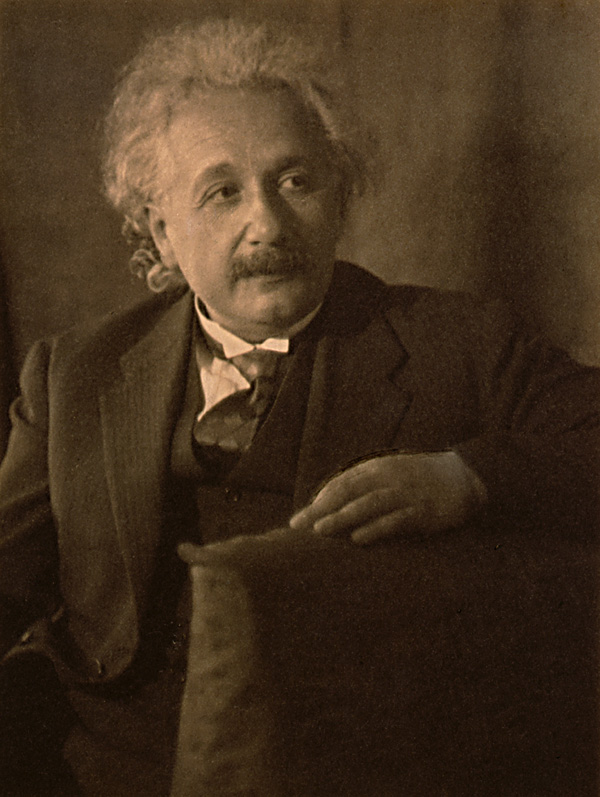
Albert Einstein

As Albert Einstein was born in Ulm in 1879, it was suggested repeatedly that the university be named after him. In November 2006, the senate of the university finally decided to rename the university. As this decision was however not confirmed by the Ministry of Science, Research and Arts of the State of Baden-Württemberg, the university was not renamed to Albert Einstein University of Ulm (German: Albert-Einstein-Universität Ulm) as of July 2007, and stayed as Ulm University. However, the street on which the main buildings of the Ulm University are located, and thus the physical address of the university, was named "Albert-Einstein-Allee" in honor of Einstein.

== Campus and facilities ==
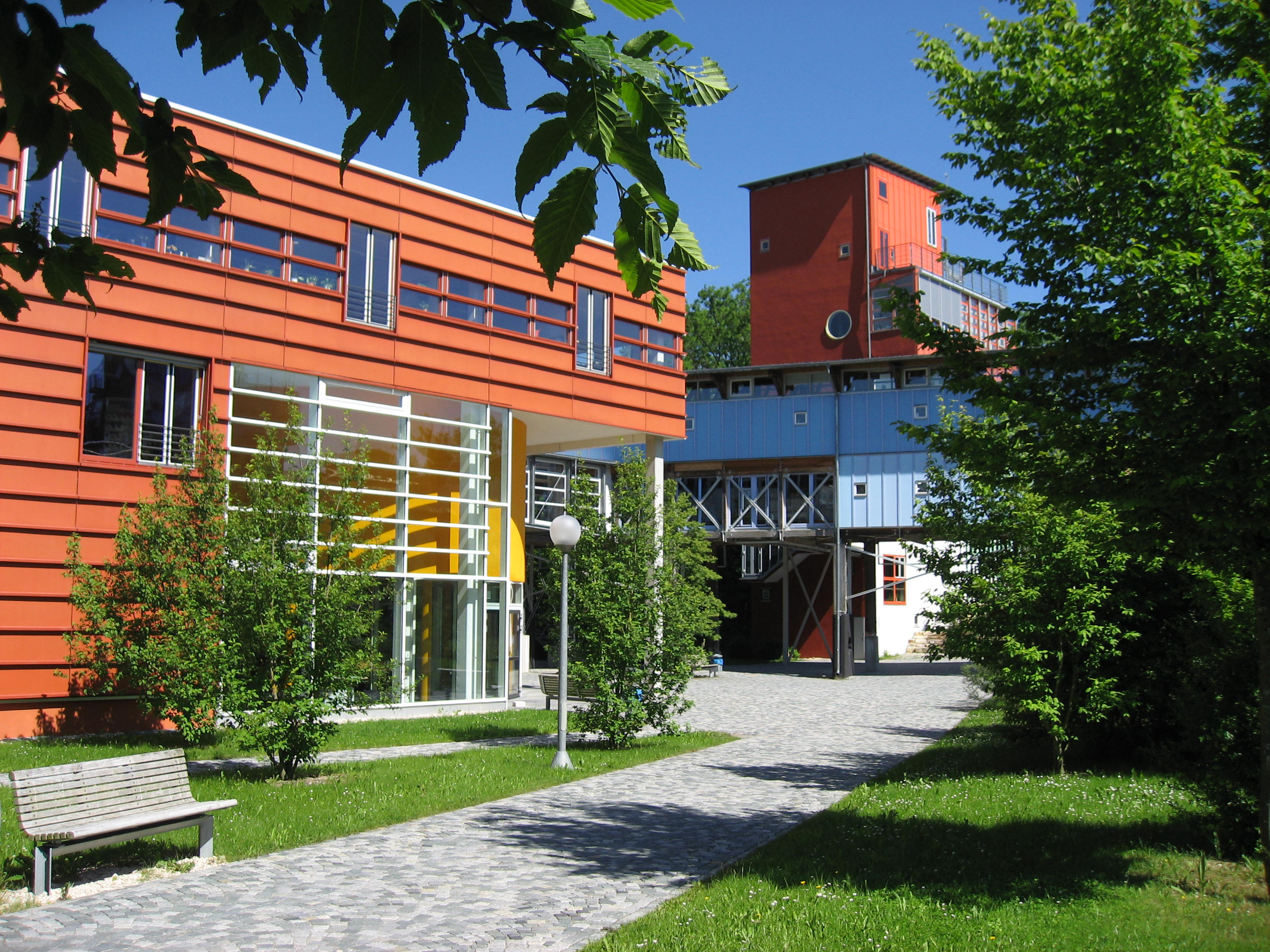
The library building

=== Academy for Science, Industry and Technology ===
In 2008, the academy again expanded its course programme, including a newly added program entitled "Special Pain Therapy". This is an 80-hour course following the curriculum of the German Medical Association, which is taught in 14 themed blocks in four modules. Another new offer is a three-semester program in "Commercial Mediation and Organizational Development", which consists of nine modules and follows the guidelines of the Federal Association for Mediation in Commerce and the Workplace. Within another newly integrated program on intercultural training, the problems of intercultural communication and interaction were dealt with. The aim here is to shorten the adaptation phase in a foreign culture during a stay abroad and thereby ease integration into the new studying or working environment. In 2008, 875 participants took advantage of the academy's course offerings. The most popular in terms of participant numbers was again the "Compact Seminar Emergency Medicine", followed by the course offerings from the International Center for Advanced Studies (ICAS) and the distance learning programmes in actuarial science.

=== The Science Park ===
The University of Ulm's campus is located on a hill on the outskirts of the city of Ulm hosts a variety of public and industrial research and development programs, as well as three major hospitals – jointly referred to as the science park.

== Organization ==
The university is composed of four divisions, which in German universities traditionally are called faculties, and separate institutes. The four faculties are the medical faculty, the engineering, computer science and psychology faculty, the natural sciences faculty and the mathematics and economics faculty. A university hospital is associated with the medical faculty.

=== Faculties ===
The University of Ulm is divided into four faculties, each with its numerous scientific establishments, the institutes. The faculties are headed by the deans' offices, which are responsible for coordinating student services.

- Faculty of Engineering, Computer Science and Psychology
- Faculty of Mathematics and Economics
- Faculty of Natural Sciences
- Faculty of Medicine

== Academic profile ==
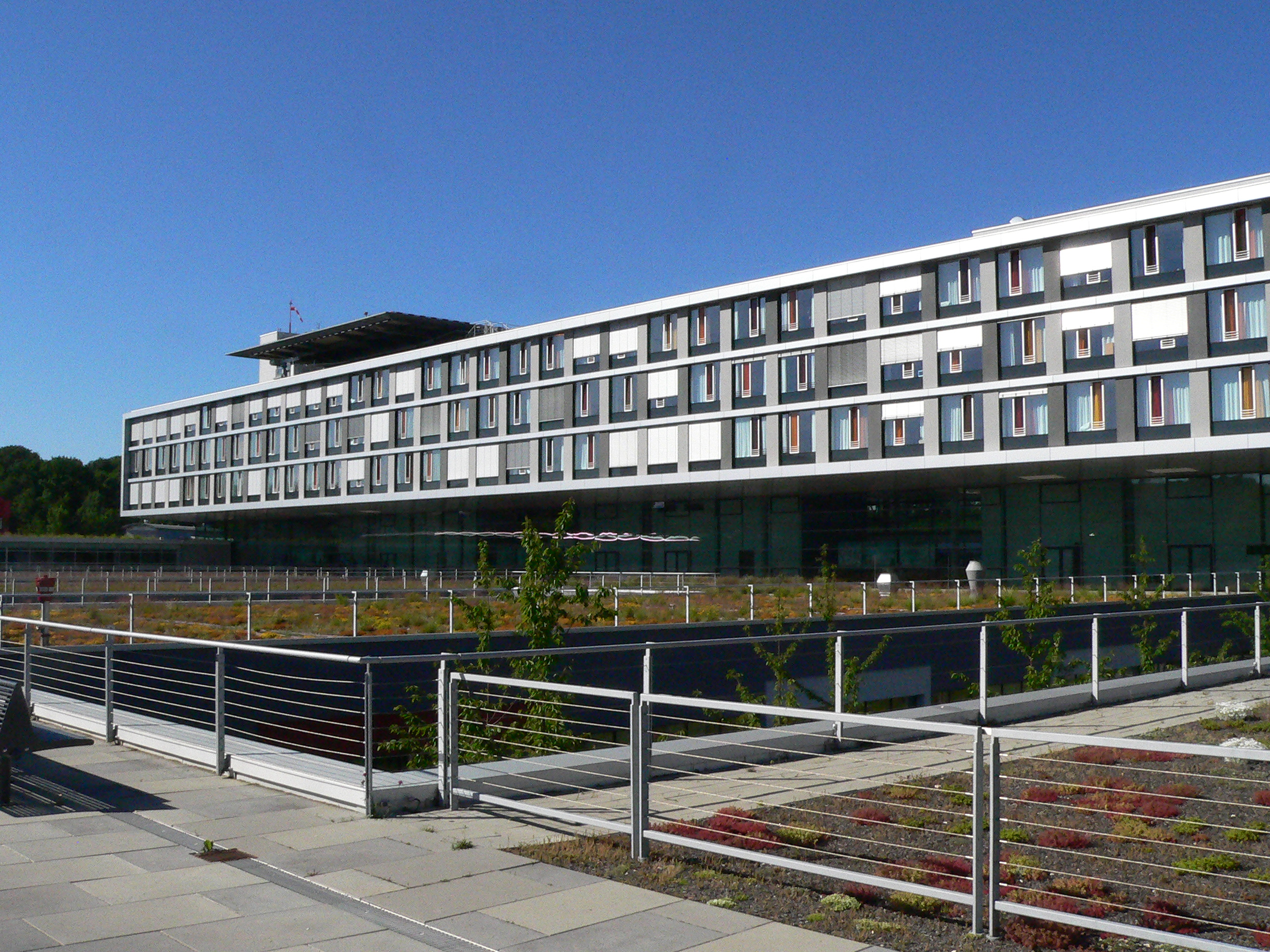
University Hospital Ulm, Center for Surgery

=== Research ===
The university has defined four profile areas among its fields of research:

- Green Energy
- Quantum Technologies
- Life Long Health
- From Data to Knowledge

Within the German Universities Excellence Initiative it is home to the POLiS (Post Lithium Storage) Cluster of Excellency together with Karlsruhe and Gießen.

=== Collaborative Research Centers ===
Collaborative Research Centers (Sonderforschungsbereiche – SFBs) are interdisciplinary research projects at one or more universities, funded by the German Research Foundation for up to 12 years. They are reviewed by the German Research Foundation in a three-year rotation. Currently, the University of Ulm has two continued Collaborative Research Centers: SFB 1506 "Aging at Interfaces" and SFB/Transregio 234 "Light-driven Molecular Catalysts in Hierarchically Structured Materials – Synthesis and Mechanistic Studies".

=== International exchange ===
The University of Ulm currently holds 101 bilateral agreements with 79 partner universities in 19 European countries. During 2008, a total of 43 students from these partner universities studied in Ulm, while 54 students from Ulm studied abroad at European partner universities under the ERASMUS program. From overseas partners, 38 students came to study at the University of Ulm for a full year and 51 students from Ulm took part in our 27 overseas exchange programs. A particularly large number went to Canada and Australia as well as to the US. A large proportion of international students enroll in the two-year Master in Finance program that blends finance and mathematics.

=== Partnerships and collaborations ===
The idea behind the "Ulm Science Park", joining university and industrial research, is implemented successfully by collaboration between the university's associated institutions and the university, the University of Applied Science, the University Hospital and industry. Application-oriented research is in the foreground. The first associated institution was founded in 1985, the Institute for Laser Technology in Medicine and Measurement Technique (ILM), as a foundation under public law.{} Other local partnerships include:

- Ulm Innovation Region
- Ulm Science Park
- IHK Ulm
- Ulm University of Applied Science
- New Ulm University of Applied Science
- Stadt Ulm/Neu-Ulm
- Ulmer Volkshochschule
- Stadtbiblothek Ulm

=== German University in Cairo ===
Together with the University of Stuttgart, the university is a partner university of the German University in Cairo.

== Rankings ==
University rankings

Overall – Global & National
QS World 2024	542	34
THE World 2024	=193	19-21
ARWU World 2023	401–500	25–31

According to the 2024 QS World University Rankings, the University of Ulm was placed 542nd globally and 34th nationally within Germany. In the Times Higher Education World University Rankings of 2024, the University of Ulm was ranked 193rd worldwide, while securing 19-21st place in the national context. The Academic Ranking of World Universities (ARWU) for 2022 also provided a range for its global and national placement, ranking it between 401–500 internationally and between 25–31 in Germany.

== Notable faculty ==
- Dieter Grossmann (born 1926) – professor of painting
- Erich Sackmann (born 1934) – experimental physicist
- Franz Josef Radermacher (born 1950) – mathematician and economist
- Helmut Maier (born 1953) – mathematician
- Elisabeth Kalko (1962–2011) – tropical scientist and ecologist
- Martin Bodo Plenio (born 1968) – physicist
- Heiner Fangerau (born 1972) – historian of medicine and medical ethics
- Wolfgang P. Schleich (born 1957) – theoretical physicist

== Notable alumni ==
- Reiner Knizia (born 1957) – German-style board game designer
- Sarah Straub, doctorate in psychology, 2015. Musician, songwriter and pianist.
