= John F. Kennedy Institute for North American Studies =

Freie Universität Berlin academic unit

- John-F.-Kennedy-Institut für Nordamerikastudien
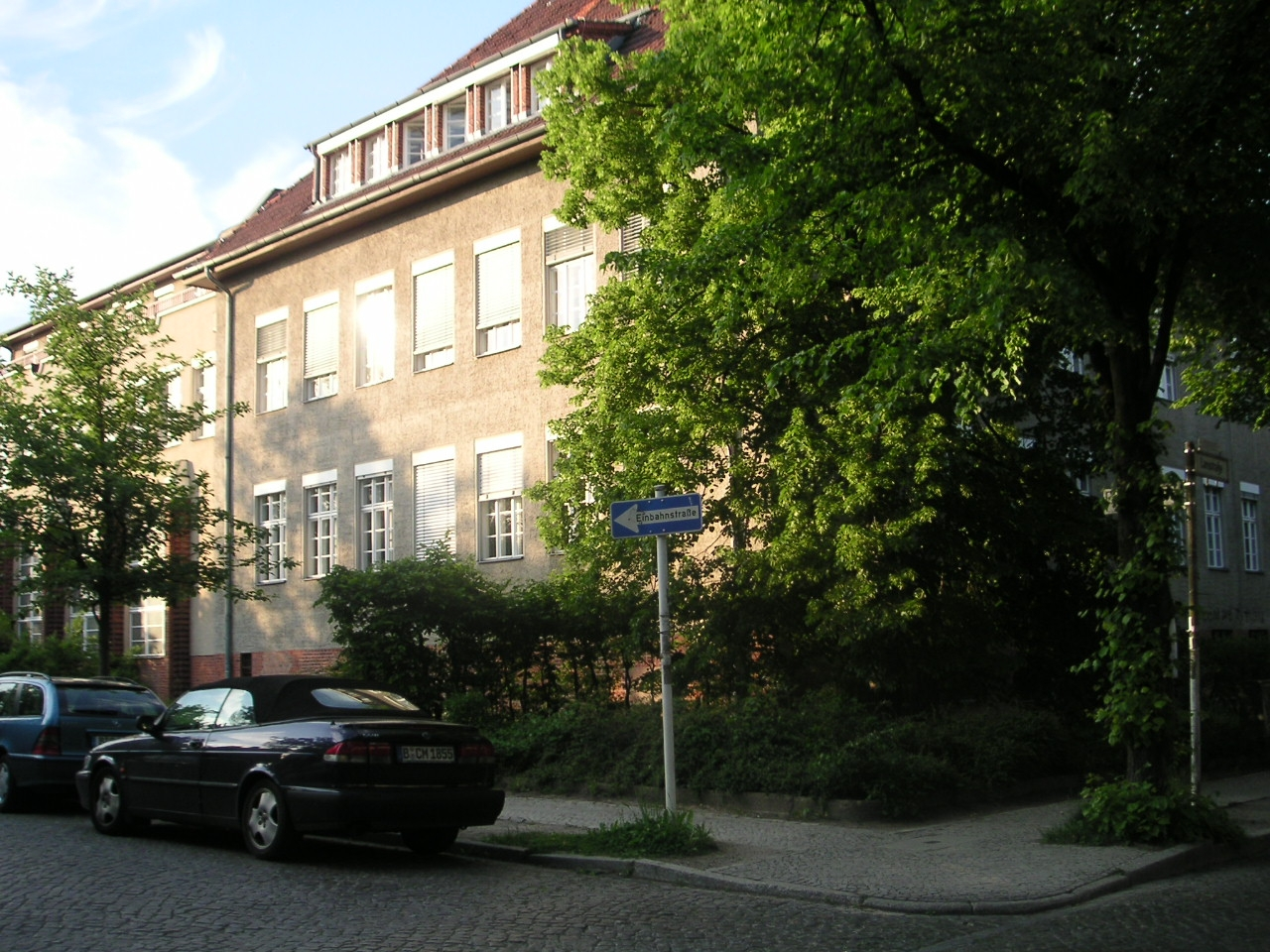
- Building of the John F. Kennedy Institute
- Type: Institute
- Established: 1963
- Affiliations: Freie Universität Berlin
- Dean: Sebastian Kohl
- Location: Berlin, Germany
- Website: www.jfki.fu-berlin.de

The John F. Kennedy Institute for North American Studies (JFKI) is a central institute at Freie Universität Berlin. The JFKI was founded in 1963 by Ernst Fraenkel, a political scientist and was named in the honor of John F. Kennedy after his assassination. It is considered one of the world's foremost centers surrounding the study the United States.

The JFKI seeks to explore North America in all its dimensions. Focusing on the United States and Canada, research and teaching at the JFKI combine culture, history, and literature with political science, sociology, and economics.

Along with the Institute for East European Studies and the Institute for Latin American Studies, John F. Kennedy Institute for North American Studies is one of the three interdisciplinary research institutes within the Free University of Berlin.

== History ==
The Amerika-Institut was founded in November 1954. It continued the tradition of the Berlin Amerika-Institut, which was founded in 1910 and had already dealt with North America from various specialist perspectives before the Second World War. Under the National Socialists, however, the institute degenerated into a pure propaganda institution. Until 1962, the new Amerika-Institut was subordinate to the English Department, as was usual in most German universities, and therefore mainly dealt with American literature.

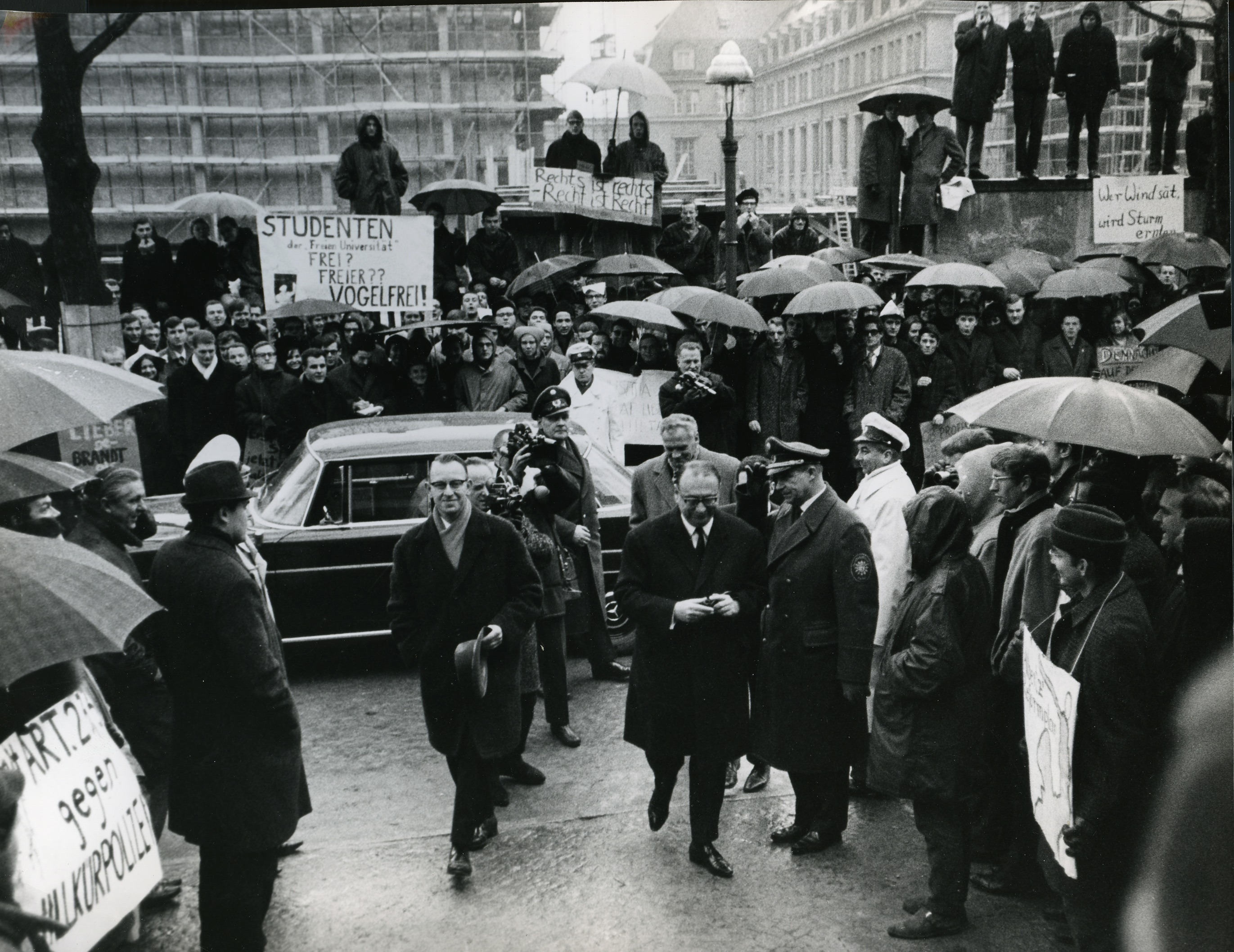
Picture of then-Berlin mayor Heinrich Albertz attending the opening ceremony of the John F. Kennedy Institute for North American Studies on January 28, 1967.

In 1963, political scientist Ernst Fraenkel transformed the institute into an interfaculty institute in order to enable a broad academic specialization on the US. The institute was named after John F. Kennedy, the 35th President of the United States, who was assassinated in the founding year of the institute. The extremely successful Institute for East European Studies at the Free University was also regarded as an institutional model.

Based on Fraenkel's concept of integrative political science, the institute was to approach the political system of the US from different disciplinary perspectives. According to this concept, the political system of a country can only be understood by including culture, society and the economy. Initially, the institute had the departments of American Literature, American Politics, American Civilization (Culture), American History, Geography of North America and American Economics. Sociology and Linguistics were added later.

In order to do justice to its interdisciplinary claim, the institute soon moved to its current building in Lansstraße in Berlin Dahlem, where a school had previously been located.The short distances between the departments were intended to stimulate exchange between the chairs. Fraenkel set up the directorate in an adjacent building. In 1967, the institute was inaugurated with a ceremony attended by the then Mayor of Berlin, Heinrich Albertz, as well as numerous American dignitaries who had made outstanding contributions to the reconstruction of West Berlin as a science location. At the time of the ceremony, almost all of the institute's chairs were occupied: Charles Nichols took over literary studies, Ernst Fraenkel politics, Ursula Brumm culture, Gerald Stourzh history and Karl Lenz geography. In his opening speech, Ernst Fraenkel referred to the following goals of the institute:

1. to be a center of American studies, suitable for making available to scholars not only from Berlin and the Federal Republic of Germany, but from all European countries, the sources, materials and scientific literature necessary for useful scientific work on the various aspects of the overall phenomenon of the US, as well as to serve as a place for their cooperation;
2. to develop a relatively small number of specialists in the Americas who strive to gain a historically in-depth insight into the intellectual, geographical, cultural, social, and political-economic structure of the United States through the integration of specialized studies in several disciplines of American studies;
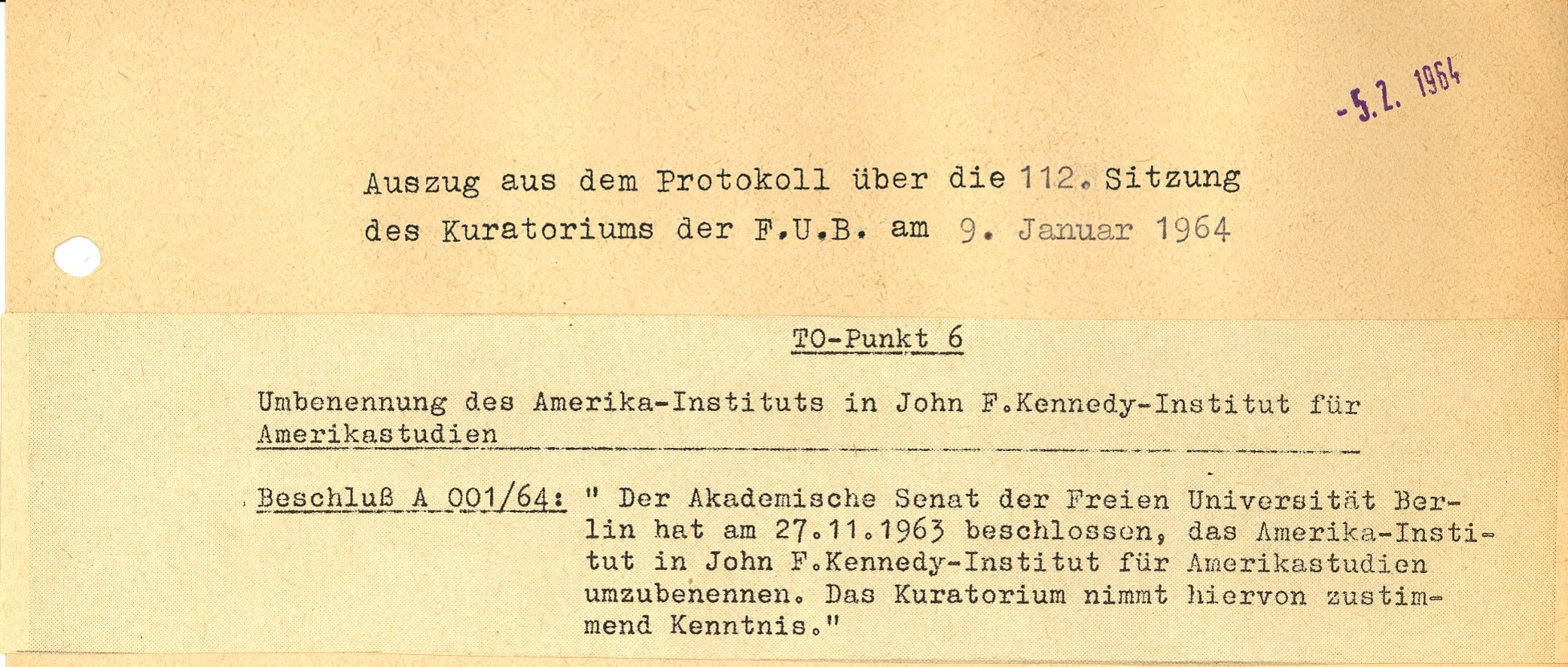
  Excerpt from the protocol of a FU Berlin curatorium session concerned with the renaming of the "Amerika-Institut" to "John F. Kennedy- Institut für Amerikastudien" held on January 9, 1964.
3. to provide a broad group of minor students with the knowledge of American literature, history, social and cultural studies that will enable them to overcome the many preconceptions that make understanding the United States so excessively difficult and to acquire knowledge that is essential to a better understanding of the United States and the issues that affect it than has been the case in the past.

As the teaching of English in the Federal Republic of Germany at this time was almost exclusively focused on Great Britain, the third goal was primarily dedicated to student teachers. With the founding of the institute shortly after the Berlin Wall was built, the young Federal Republic wanted above all to do justice to the important status of the occupying power. The Ford Foundation supported this project with one million dollars, which enabled the establishment of an American library in West Berlin.

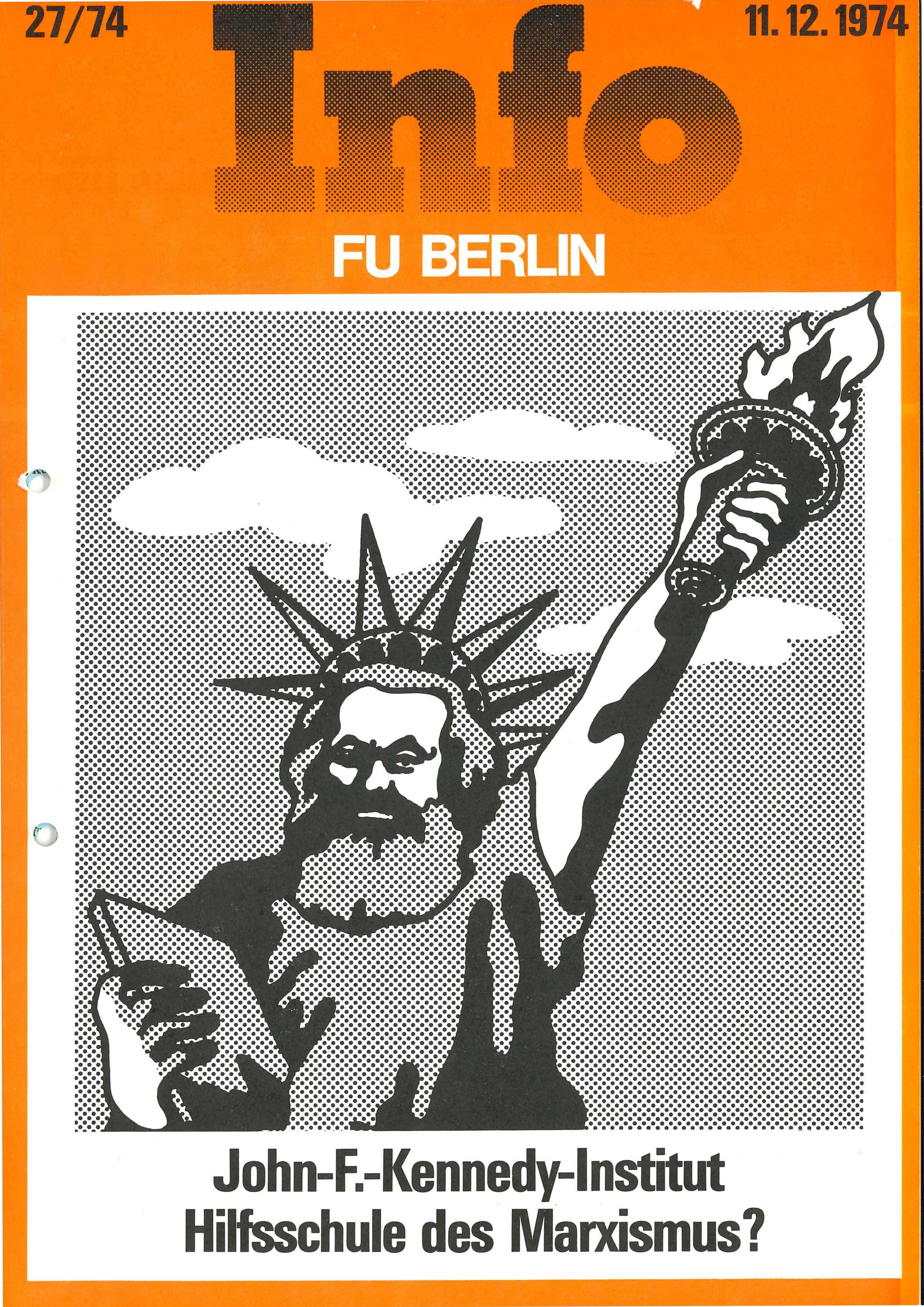
Cover of the FU Berlin Student's Magazine FU Info issue 27/74. Published on November 12, 1974, it reads: "John-F.-Kennedy-Institute– Auxiliary School of Marxism?" Picture courtesy of Winfried Fluck.

Due to its proximity to U.S. institutions, the institute was soon targeted by the Stasi. As part of the student movement of 1968, which was particularly strongly represented at Freie Universität and showed solidarity with the anti-Vietnam protests in the US, demonstrations were also repeatedly held at the institute. After the new Berlin Higher Education Act of 1969 gave students and employees the same number of votes on the Institute Council as professors, the mood became increasingly polarized. In 1974, an FU publication was titled: "John F. Kennedy Institute - Auxiliary School of Marxism?".

In response, the Free University extended the chairs at the institute by 5 positions, thus once again creating a majority for the professors. In the years that followed, the institute slowly worked its way towards normal operations. In 1989, a master's degree program was introduced and in 1991 the graduate school "The USA and the Problem of Democracy" was established with funding from the DFG.

With numerous funding programs from the Fulbright Commission, the Canadian Embassy and the Terra Foundation for American Art, among others, the institute also endeavoured to be a hub for North American researchers from all over Europe (including Eastern Europe) as well as American academics. With the Ernst Fraenkel Lectures, the institute regularly hosted prominent lectures on relevant North American topics that were open to the public.

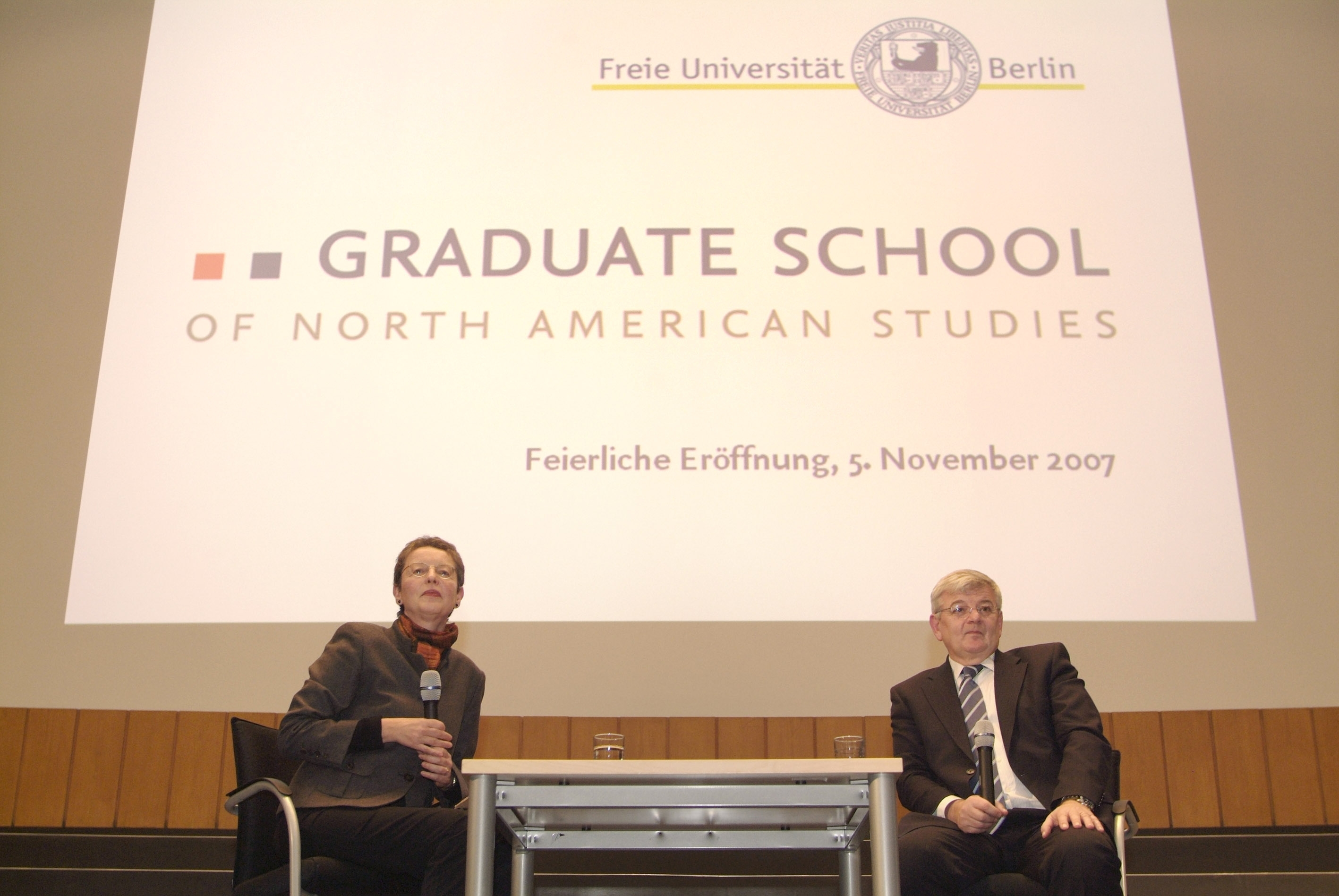
Former politician, minister of foreign affairs, and vice chancellor Joschka Fischer at the opening ceremony of the Graduate School of North American Studies on November 5, 2007.

In 2005 and 2006, the John F. Kennedy Institute converted its degree programs to bachelor's and master's degrees in accordance with the Bologna Reform. The following year, it won one of the coveted places in the German government's Excellence Initiative with its interdisciplinary graduate school project, which was in line with the institute's basic principles. The Graduate School of North American Studies opened in 2007 and initially enabled 10 doctoral students per year from various disciplines to complete a dissertation with a North American focus and receive support from North American guest researchers. Since 2019, the overarching research topic has been "Transformations of 'Democracy' in North America".

== Departments ==
Today, the JFKI combines the fields of North American culture, literature, history, politics, economics and sociology in six departments. The respective professors remain financially and organizationally anchored in their respective departments. However, the status as a central institute is intended to strengthen interdisciplinary exchange and facilitate joint research projects.

Students on the bachelor's and master's degree courses, which are now taught entirely in English, choose subject specializations during the course of their studies. Modules such as the institute's traditional lecture series, which is organized each semester by two professors from different disciplines, aim to hone interdisciplinary skills.

Graduates of the JFKI work as journalists, publicists and writers; they curate exhibitions in museums and promote scientific and political exchange with North America in foundations; they take up positions in public relations or in the management of transatlantic companies.

== Library of North American Studies ==
The Library of North American Studies (a branch library of the University Library of the Freie Universität Berlin) holds over 480,000 items. It represents the largest collection in the field of North American studies in Europe in terms of both scope and subject coverage. Consequently, the library performs a supraregional service function within the interlibrary loan network of German university libraries. Its collection priorities align with the institute's departments and cover the United States and Canada. From 2011 to 2015, the Library of North American Studies served as the library responsible for the "Special Subject Collection" (SSG) for North American newspapers (SSG 7.261). This special collection mandate built upon an existing focus on North American newspapers. A priority area that had been funded from 1975 to 2010 through the German Research Foundation’s (DFG) program for academic libraries. Since 2016, the library has been jointly responsible - alongside the Göttingen State and University Library - for the DFG-funded Specialized Information Service for Anglo-American Culture (FID AAC). Under this funding scheme, the library has been able to build a substantial collection of North American comics and graphic novels, as well as an extensive holding of TV series. Furthermore, thanks to DFG funding, it now provides digital access to major US daily newspapers.

== Graduate School of North American Studies ==
The Graduate School of North American Studies at the JFKI was awarded with funding during the German excellence initiative for its Ph.D. program themed "The Challenges of Freedom". It was one of only two graduate schools in the humanities among 18 graduate schools in total which received this honor in October 2007. The Graduate School of North American Studies was established with the aim of examining the challenges of the ideal of freedom in contemporary North America. The first director was Ulla Haselstein. In 2012, funding was extended for a further five years as part of the Excellence Initiative.

== Former guest lecturers and visiting professors by department ==
Linguistics and Culture	Politics	Literature	History	Sociology	Economics
Francis Golffing (1956-1957)	Reynold Wick (1956)	Carl Dolmetsch (1964–1965)	Dietrich Gerhard (1959)	Martin Oppenheimer (1976)	L. W. Levine (1977)
Delmore Schwartz (1957-1958)	Robert Jackson (1979)	Esther M. Jackson (1968)	Manfred Jonas (1959-1962)	Arthur Paris (1985)	Marvin McInnis (1986)
Paul Moore (1958)	Tom Flanagan (1983)	George Creeger (1968–1969)	Charles Crowe (1963)	Gerald A. McWorter (1985)	Nicholas Mercuro (1993)
Daniel Fuchs (1980-1981, 1987)	George McGovern (1989)	Jules Chametzky (1970–1971, 1975)	Richard Brandon Morris (1969)	Dietrich Rueschemeyer (1992)	Randall Kroszner (1995)
Karen C. Kossuth (1980-1981)	Leslie A. Pal (1989)	Roland Hagenbüchle (1975)	Henry D. Shapiro (1978)	Danielle Juteau (1994)	Gary Libecap (1996)
Philip Fisher (1981)	Jean Edward Smith (1989)	Mathew Winston (1975–1977)	Nathan Huggins(1980)	Edward Tiryakian (1996)	Barbara Sands (1996)
Carl Dolmetsch (1981-1982)	Peter H. Merkl (1991)	John Fuegi (1977)	Carroll Smith-Rosenberg (1980)	Greg M. Nielsen (1999)	Gerd Hardach (1997)
Wilson Jeremiah Moses (1983-1984)	Frank Fischer (1991–1992)	Elaine Ryan Hedges (1979, 1981)	Kathleen N. Conzen (1982)		Ulf Christian Ewert (2012–2013)
Lee C. Mitchell (1990-1991, 1995)	Roger Keil (1996)	Audre Lorde (1984)	Kenneth W. K. McNaught (1982)		
Monica Heller (1992, 1997)	Patricia Mann (1998)	Brenda F. Berrian (1985)	Bernard Mergen (1982)		
Werner Sollors (1993)		George Bowering (1985)	George A. Levesque (1983)		
Richard Shusterman (1995-1996)		Paul B. Armstrong (1985–1986)	Donald Avery (1987)		
Scott Bukatman (1996)		Caroline Hall (1989–1990)	Robert Bieder (1988–1989)		
Normand Labrie (1996-1997)		Phil Fischer (1990)	Walter H. Conser (1990)		
Mark Poster (1997)		Peter Buitenhuis (1991)	Milton Sernett (1994–1995)		
Smalley Mike Cook (2001)		Eva-Marie Kroeller (1993)	John Bumsted (1995)		
Gregory Fowler (2002–2003)		Terence Martin (1995)	Donald Fixico (1997)		
Walter Metz (2003–2004)		James Mendelsohn (1996–1997)	Sharon O’Brien (1997)		
Andrew Hemingway (2013–2014)		Andrew Gross (2003–2004)	Henry Wend (2001)		
Michael Schreyach (2014)		MaryAnn Snyder-Körber (2015–2017)	Marcel Martel (2002)		
Kenneth Haltman (2014)			Rosalind Beier (2003-2004)		
Michele Helene Bogart (2015)			Gerald Friesen (2004)		
Heather Diack (2016)			Gudrun Löhrer (2009–2013)		
Allison M. Stagg (2016-2017)					
David Getsy (2020–2021)					
JoAnne Marie Mancini (2022)					

== Professorships by department ==
Culture	Politics	Literature	History	Sociology	Wirtschaft	Geography	Linguistics
Eric Barnes (1953–1954)	Ernst Fraenkel (1963–1967)	Charles H. Nichols (1963–1969)	Gerald Stourzh (1964–1969)	Rudolf Braun (1969–1971)	Rudolf Braun (1969–1971)	Karl Lenz (1966-1996)	Eric Barnes (1953–1954)
John McCormick (1955–1959)	Arnulf Baring (1970–1977)	Armin Paul Frank (1970–1975)	Hans-Ulrich Wehler (1970–1971)	Hans Joas (1990–2002)	Carl-Ludwig Holtfrerich (1983–2007)		John McCormick (1955–1959)
Charles H. Nichols (1959–1989)	Ekkehart Krippendorf (1978–1989)	Jürgen Peper (1970–1972)	Knud Krakau (1974–2000)	Harald Wenzel (2004–2021)	Irwin L. Collier (2008–2018)		Charles H. Nichols (1959–1963)
Ursula Brumm (1963–1989)	Herbert Spiro (1981–1989)	Michael Hoenisch (1971–2003)	Willi Paul Adams (1977–2002)	Sebastian Kohl (2022–present)	Max Steinhardt (2018-present)		Michael Hoenisch (1971–1975)
Renate Schmidt-von Bardeleben (1979–1981)	Margit Mayer (1990–2014)	Heinz Ickstadt (1978–2003)	Ursula Lehmkuhl (2002–2010)				Carol W. Pfaff (1977–2009)
Winfried Fluck (1989–2012)	Lora A. Viola (2020–present)	Edith Mettke (1980–1995)	Jessica Gienow-Hecht (2013–present)				Colman Kraft (1980–1995)
Frank Kelleter (2013–present)	Christian Lammert (2012–present)	Ulla Haselstein (2004-2023)					
		Stefanie Müller (2024-present)					
