= Hubert Harrison: The Struggle for Equality, 1918–1927 =

2020 book by Jeffrey B. Perry

- Cover
- Author: Jeffrey B. Perry
- Language: English
- Subject: Hubert Harrison, New Negro Movement, Harlem Renaissance, African American history
- Genre: Biography
- Publisher: Columbia University Press
- Publication date: December 2020
- Publication place: United States
- Media type: Print (hardcover and paperback) and e-book
- Pages: 1000
- ISBN: 978-0-231-18263-8 (paperback)
- Dewey Decimal: 323.1196/073
- LC Class: E185.97.H367 P465 2021
- Preceded by: Hubert Harrison: The Voice of Harlem Radicalism, 1883–1918 (2008)

Hubert Harrison: The Struggle for Equality, 1918–1927 is a 2020 biography by the American independent scholar Jeffrey B. Perry, published by Columbia University Press. It is the second volume of Perry's two-part life of the St. Croix–born Harlem writer, orator, and activist Hubert Harrison (1883–1927). It follows Hubert Harrison: The Voice of Harlem Radicalism, 1883–1918 (2008) and covers the last nine and a half years of Harrison's life, from his return to Harlem in July 1918 to his death from appendicitis complications in December 1927. Using Harrison's diary, papers, scrapbooks, and writings, Perry documents his attempt to revive the New Negro Movement, his editorship of Marcus Garvey's Negro World and his disputes with the Universal Negro Improvement Association, his work as a Board of Education lecturer and newspaper columnist, and his founding of the International Colored Unity League. The book was nominated by its publisher for the Pulitzer Prize. It was also shortlisted for the Wesley-Logan Prize, the Isaac and Tamara Deutscher Memorial Prize, the Plutarch Award, the National Book Critics Circle Award, and the John Hope Franklin Publication Prize.

== Background ==
The volume is the second of a two-part biography that Perry began researching around 1980 after encountering brief discussions of Hubert Harrison in J. A. Rogers's World's Great Men of Color, in an entry by Richard B. Moore in the Dictionary of American Negro Biography, and in writings by Philip S. Foner. Perry first read Harrison's two published books on microfiche at the Schomburg Center for Research in Black Culture and was struck by what he later described as the centrality of the struggle against white supremacy in Harrison's thought and Harrison's argument that white supremacy was not in the interest of European-American working people.

After sending a series of inquiry letters, Perry was put in contact through a Virgin Islands librarian with Harrison's children, the activist William Harrison and the educator Aida Harrison Richardson, who had preserved their father's papers in a closet of a railroad-flat apartment since his death in 1927. The family entrusted the papers to Perry, who inventoried, transcribed, and digitized them. He completed his Columbia University doctoral dissertation on the first half of Harrison's life in 1986 under Nathan Huggins and Hollis Lynch, with Eric Foner, Elliott P. Skinner, and Charles V. Hamilton also serving on his oral examination committee. Only after the dissertation was approved did Aida Harrison Richardson hand him Harrison's previously unknown diary, which the family had also kept.

The first volume, Hubert Harrison: The Voice of Harlem Radicalism, 1883–1918, was originally contracted to Louisiana State University Press, which Perry said held the manuscript for over a decade despite favorable readers' reports. On the recommendation of the historian Winston James, Perry approached the senior editor Peter Dimock at Columbia University Press, broke the LSU contract, and Columbia published the first volume in 2008. The second volume, published in December 2020, runs to nearly 200 pages of notes and was issued after Perry, in coordination with Harrison's grandson Charles Richardson, placed the Hubert H. Harrison Papers at Columbia University's Rare Book and Manuscript Library; over 1,300 items from the collection, including Harrison's 200-page diary, were subsequently digitized and made available online through Columbia's Digital Library Collections, and the book's notes link directly to those documents and to corresponding works held by the HathiTrust and Internet Archive.

Perry said that the second volume was needed because the first ended in 1918, leaving the final nine and a half years of Harrison's life uncovered, and that throughout the volume he sought to "let Harrison speak for himself." He framed his approach with three epigraphs: Harrison's own October 1920 "Meditation" titled "A Soul in Search of Itself," in which Harrison wrote that "no man was ever as good as his creed"; a June 1921 letter from Eugene O'Neill to Harrison stating that "the only propaganda that ever strikes home is the truth about the human soul, black or white"; and J. A. Rogers's reminder that no leader's life, studied in detail, resembles "the handsome image presented by ecstatic admirers." The work also takes its impetus from Arturo Alfonso Schomburg's remark at Harrison's funeral that "He came ahead of his time."

== Summary ==
The book covers the final nine and a half years of Harrison's life, from his return to Harlem from the Liberty Congress in July 1918 to his death from appendicitis complications on December 17, 1927, and runs to roughly 988 pages based on Harrison's diary, scrapbooks, papers, and writings, with Bureau of Investigation files, UNIA records, and the contemporary Black and radical press as supplementary sources.

Perry organizes the book in four parts. The first follows Harrison's revival of his newspaper The Voice as the organ of what he had named the New Negro Movement, his break with W. E. B. Du Bois over the "Close Ranks" editorial of 1918, his attack on Joel E. Spingarn's role in Military Intelligence, his editorship of the New Negro monthly in 1919, and his surveillance by the Bureau of Investigation, which feared his Harlem street oratory. Perry casts him as the "father of Harlem radicalism," who under "Race First" sought to push race-conscious politics into the South and called for armed self-defense against lynching during the Red Summer of 1919.

The second part takes up Harrison's editorship of the Negro World, the newspaper of Marcus Garvey's Universal Negro Improvement Association (UNIA), in 1920. Perry argues that Harrison "significantly reshaped" the paper, ending its practice of reprinting from white dailies and turning it in a socialist and race-conscious direction. Perry weighs the Harrison–Garvey relationship at length, contending that Garvey lifted Harrison's Liberty League platform to relaunch the UNIA. Harrison kept his distance from Garvey, attacking him in his diary for self-aggrandizement, financial mismanagement, and intimidation of critics. Perry follows Harrison's quarrel with the Black socialists of The Emancipator, his disputes at the 1920 UNIA convention at which Garvey named himself "provisional president of Africa," his 1921 essay "Wanted—A Colored International," and Garvey's 1922 arrest for mail fraud, during which Harrison gave federal authorities evidence about the nonexistent SS Phyllis Wheatley. Diary entries also record his brief 1925 affair with Amy Ashwood Garvey, Garvey's estranged first wife.

The third part follows Harrison's years as what he called a "Free-Lance Educator," 1922–1924. Shut out of elite universities, he earned his living from street-corner oratory, paid lectures for the New York City Board of Education at the 135th Street Library and the Brooklyn Central YMCA, a column in the Boston Chronicle, book reviews, and his own course on "World Problems of Race." He was naturalized in 1922. Perry credits him with the first regular book-review and "Poetry for the People" columns in a Black newspaper, and follows his exchange with Eugene O'Neill about The Emperor Jones and his writings on the Ku Klux Klan, Virgin Islands citizenship, and the early Harlem Renaissance. Perry argues that this work helped prepare the way for Alain Locke's 1925 anthology The New Negro, which nevertheless excluded Harrison.

The fourth part focuses on the International Colored Unity League, founded in 1924, with its program of pan-African solidarity, electoral independence, cooperative Black-owned business, and a proposed "Negro state" within the United States—a call that, Perry notes, preceded the Communist International's "black belt" thesis by four years. The same part takes in Harrison's Midwest tour for Robert La Follette's 1924 presidential campaign, his work with the Communist Party–run American Negro Labor Congress, his 1926 lectures on race as a "mental reflex" to political domination under early capitalism, his attack on the "Cabaret School of Negro Writers," his role in the 1926 Lafayette Theatre strike, his review of Carl Van Vechten's Nigger Heaven, and his last writings for the Pittsburgh Courier and his own Voice of the Negro. The book also records the poverty of Harrison, his wife Lin, and their five children, and his refusals of both white patronage and Communist Party money.

The book ends with Harrison's death from peritonitis at Bellevue Hospital after appendix surgery, his funeral and the eulogies of Richard B. Moore, Edgar Grey, and Arturo Alfonso Schomburg, the renaming of the Harlem Community Church as the Hubert Harrison Memorial Church, and his fading from public memory. Perry casts Harrison as "the most class conscious of the race radicals and the most race conscious of the class radicals," and as a link between the labor and civil-rights tradition of A. Philip Randolph and Martin Luther King Jr. and the race and nationalist tradition of Garvey and Malcolm X.

== Critics ==
Adam Ewing called the volume the work that "secures Perry's legacy as the preeminent chronicler of Harrison's life," and praised the comprehensive sutdy of the relationship between Harrison, Garvey, and the Universal Negro Improvement Association as one of the book's great strengths.

Denise Lynn described the book as an attempt "to resurrect an overlooked Black radical who theorized a Black liberatory ethos that influenced generations of activists," and accepted Perry's argument that Harrison "was not forgotten but that he has been unremembered." Lynn found Perry's analysis of Harrison's role in radicalizing Garvey and the Universal Negro Improvement Association persuasive. However, she thought that the book left "lingering questions around some of Harrison's contradictions and how his political ideology evolved," but, applying Harrison's own standard for book reviewing, concluded that Perry had fulfilled his goal and that the volume was "worthy of your time."

Wilson J. Moses judged the volume as a "long-anticipated" continuation of what he termed "two magisterial volumes" and considered the combined 1,588-page biography (both volume I and II) itself evidence of the previous neglect of Harrison's importance.

Ken Olende described it as an "epic, two-part biography" that recovers a Black revolutionary intellectual whose work on race, class, socialism, and imperialism "remains relevant, despite his death almost a century ago." Olende thought that Perry's decision to "report Harrison's development rather than critique it" was the right one for a primary biographical reconstruction, but argued that Harrison's 1922 cooperation with federal authorities against Garvey was "shockingly naive" given Harrison's own analysis of the capitalist state.

In his review of the book in The Nation, Robert Greene II considered the two volumes together a successful attempt to correct the eclipse of Harrison's reputation since the 1960s. Perry's "background as a working-class intellectual," thought Greene, made him "the perfect person to help recover one of the early 20th century's great Black intellectuals and socialists."
