= Futures of American Studies =

The Futures of American Studies is a weeklong academic summer institute dedicated to presenting new work and critiquing the field of American Studies held at Dartmouth College in Hanover, New Hampshire. The first Futures of American Studies Institute was held in the summer of 1997. Donald E. Pease, Professor of English at Dartmouth College, founded, organized, and directed the annual Institute.

== Founding of the Institute ==
After the School of Criticism and Theory left Dartmouth for Cornell University in 1995, Dartmouth faculty member Donald E. Pease started the Futures Institute as an alternative summer program for faculty and graduate students. In 2017 the Futures Institute celebrated the twentieth anniversary of its founding.

== Institute Description ==
The Institute is divided into two daily plenary sessions, which feature current work from Institute faculty, and multiple three-hour research seminars in which all participants present and discuss their own work-in-progress. Speakers in the plenary sessions typically examined the relation between emergent and residual practices in the field of American Studies from a variety of interdisciplinary perspectives. Participants came from a variety of programs and schools and represent fields as diverse as American history, social geography, American literature, gender studies, and the digital humanities. The Institute welcomed participants who were involved in a range of disciplinary and interdisciplinary fields and who were interested in current critical debates in American Studies.

== Past Institutes ==
=== 2017 institute ===
The 2017 Institute was the twentieth anniversary of the founding of the Futures of American Studies Institute. Faculty included Lisa Lowe, Dana Nelson, Cindi Katz, Branka Arsic, Christian Haines, Alan Nadel, Susan Strehle, Patricia Stuelke, Russ Castronovo, David Golumbia, James E. Dobson, Eng-Beng Lim, David Eng, Rachel Lee, Karen Shimakawa, Soyica Diggs Colbert, Ronald Judy, Donatella Izzo, Heike Paul, Liam Kennedy, Winfried Fluck, Hortense Spillers, John Carlos Rowe, Tim Melley, Eric Lott, Hamilton Carroll, Annie McClanahan, Colleen Boggs, and Dana Luciano.

=== 2016 institute ===
Along with Institute Director Donald E. Pease, the institute co-directors were 2016 are:

- Elizabeth Maddock Dillon, Northeastern University
- Soyica Diggs Colbert, Georgetown University
- Eric Lott, City University of New York (CUNY) Graduate Center
- Winfried Fluck, Freie Universitaet Berlin
- Colleen Boggs, Dartmouth College
- Donatella Izzo Università degli studi di Napoli "L'Orientale"

=== 2014 institute ===
Along with Institute Director Donald E. Pease, the institute co-directors were 2014 are:

- Elizabeth Maddock Dillon, Northeastern University
- Soyica Diggs Colbert, Georgetown University
- Eric Lott, University of Virginia
- Winfried Fluck, Freie Universitaet Berlin
- J. Martin Favor, Dartmouth College
- Colleen Boggs, Dartmouth College

=== 2012 institute ===
Along with Institute Director Donald E. Pease, the institute co-directors were 2012 are:

- Elizabeth Maddock Dillon, Northeastern University
- Eric Lott, University of Virginia
- Winfried Fluck, Freie Universitaet Berlin
- J. Martin Favor, Dartmouth College
- Colleen Boggs, Dartmouth College

== Notable Plenary Lecturers ==
Each year the Futures Institute brings practicing Americanists and well-known critics and theorists working outside American studies. Notable plenary speakers from the Institute's history include:

- Hortense Spillers
- Rita Felski
- Walter Benn Michaels
- Lauren Berlant
- Tim Dean
- Bill Brown
- Mark Bauerlein
- Janice Radway

== Recent books written by Institute plenary faculty or students ==
- Eric Lott, Black Mirror: The Cultural Contradictions of American Racism, Harvard University Press, 2017 ISBN 978-0-674-967717
- James E. Dobson, Modernity and Autobiography in Nineteenth-Century America, Palgrave, 2017 ISBN 978-3-319-67322-6
- Soyica Diggs Colbert, Black Movements: Performance and Cultural Politics, Rutgers University Press, 2017 ISBN 978-0813588513
- Giorgio Mariani, Waging War on War: Peacefighting in American Literature, University of Illinois Press, 2015 ISBN 9780252039751
- Eng-Beng Lim, Brown Boys and Rice Queens: Spellbinding Performance in the Asias. NYU Press, 2014 ISBN 978-3-8376-1485-5
- Hamilton Carroll, Affirmative Reaction: New Formations of White Masculinity, New Americanist Series, Duke University Press, 2011
- Heike Paul, The Myths That Made America: An Introduction to American Studies, Transcript, 2014, ISBN 978-3-8376-1485-5
- Johannes Voelz, Transcendental Resistance: The New Americanists and Emerson's Challenge, Re-Mapping the Transnational: A Dartmouth Series in American Studies, Dartmouth College Press, 2010, ISBN 978-1-58465-937-2
- Donald E. Pease, The New American Exceptionalism, University of Minnesota Press, 2009, ISBN 978-0-8166-2783-7
- Jonathan Beecher Field, Errands into the Metropolis: New England Dissidents in Revolutionary London, Dartmouth College Press, 2009, ISBN 978-1-58465-821-4
- Jonathan Elmer, On Lingering and Being Last: Fictions of Race and Sovereignty in the New World, Fordham University Press, 2008, ISBN 978-0-8232-2941-3
- Christopher Castiglia, Interior States: Institutional Consciousness and the Inner Life of Democracy in the Antebellum U.S. New Americanist Series, Duke University Press, 2008, ISBN 978-0-8223-4267-0
- Hester Blum, The View from the Mast-Head: Maritime Imagination and Antebellum American Sea Narratives, University of North Carolina Press, 2008, ISBN 978-0-8078-3169-4
- Colleen Glenney Boggs, Transnationalism and American Literature: Literary Translation 1773-1892, Routledge Press, 2007, ISBN 978-0-415-77068-2
- Randall Fuller, Emerson's Ghosts: Literature, Politics, and the Making of Americanists, Oxford University Press US, 2007, ISBN 978-0-19-531392-5
