= Graduate School of North American Studies =

Research institute in Berlin, Germany

The Berlin Graduate School of North American Studies (GSNAS) is affiliated with the John F. Kennedy Institute for North American Studies at the Free University Berlin. It was distinguished by the German Universities Excellence Initiative in 2006, a nationwide competition carried out by the Federal Ministry of Education and Research, together with the German Research Foundation. The GSNAS was officially opened by the former German minister for foreign affairs, Joschka Fischer, in November 2007. Speakers of the Graduate School of North American Studies are Prof. Dr. Ulla Haselstein and Prof. Dr. Winfried Fluck.

== Vision ==
By combining closely supervised doctoral education with excellent theoretical and methodological research training, the Graduate School of North American Studies enables its doctoral candidates to complete outstanding dissertations within a period of three years, and prepares them for a career in universities, research institutions, other science-related organizations, think tanks, scientific journalism etc. Under the overall research concept “The Challenges of Freedom”, the Graduate School of North American Studies focuses on the social, economic, and cultural changes in the North American Societies at the beginning of the 21st century in a comprehensive and interdisciplinary way.

== Research areas ==
- American Exceptionalism in a Changing World
- Nation, Ethnicity, Diaspora, and Borderlands
- Conservative Revolution and New Social Movements
- Religion in Public Life
- Arts, Aesthetics, and American Culture
- The Struggle over the Public Sphere: Media and Cultural Narratives
- Neoliberalism as an Economic and Cultural Paradigm
- Globalization and the "American centuries"

== Program ==
The program is aimed at doctoral candidates who intend to write a dissertation in one of the following disciplines: Cultural and Literary Studies, History, Political Science, Sociology, or Economics. In interdisciplinary seminars, students acquire comprehensive knowledge of the historical, social, cultural, and economic changes facing North America in the first quarter of the new century. In-depth theoretical and methodological training is provided in disciplinary seminars. As a third module, courses on professional skills (advanced academic writing, management, presentation, didactic skills) are obligatory. The language of instruction is English.

The extensive Visiting Professor-Program of the Graduate School allows its students to intensively discuss their ideas and projects with internationally renowned scholars like José Casanova (Georgetown University), Tyler Cowen (George Mason University), Jack P. Greene (Brown University), David Harvey (City University of New York), Akira Iriye (Harvard), Jackson Lears (Rutgers University), Donald E. Pease (Dartmouth College), Carla Peterson (University of Maryland) und Hayden White (Stanford University).

== Faculty ==
- Frank Adloff
- Marianne Braig
- Gerhard Braun
- Irwin Collier
- Winfried Fluck
- Jürgen Gerhards
- Michaela Hampf
- Ulla Haselstein
- Carl-Ludwig Holtfrerich (Emeritus)
- Heinz Ickstadt (Emeritus)
- Hermann Kappelhoff
- Knud Krakau (Emeritus)
- Christoph Haehling v. Lanzenauer
- Ursula Lehmkuhl
- Margit Mayer
- Winfried Menninghaus
- Paul Nolte
- Thomas Risse
- Moritz Schularick
- Sabine Schülting
- Bärbel Tischleder
- Lora Anne Viola
- Harald Wenzel

== Partner institutions ==
The Graduate School of North American Studies cooperates with the American Studies Programs of the following universities and colleges in North America: Brown University, Dartmouth College, Harvard University, Stanford University, University of California at Berkeley, University of North Carolina at Chapel Hill, and Yale University. It also cooperates with University College Dublin. In addition, partnerships exist with the Hertie School of Governance (Berlin), the American Academy in Berlin (Berlin), the Canadian Universities Centre (Berlin), the German Council on Foreign Relations (DGAP), the German Institute for Economic Research, the German Institute for International and Security Affairs, the Fritz Thyssen Foundation and the Terra Foundation.

== Admission ==
The annual deadline for applications is January 31. For further information on the application procedure, please see www.gsnas.fu-berlin.de

== See also ==
- Free University Berlin
- John F. Kennedy-Institute for North American Studies
