= Sabine Fischer =

Sabine Fischer may refer to:

- Sabine Fischer (runner)
- Sabine Fischer (political scientist)
