= Gerald Stourzh =

Austrian historian (born 1929)

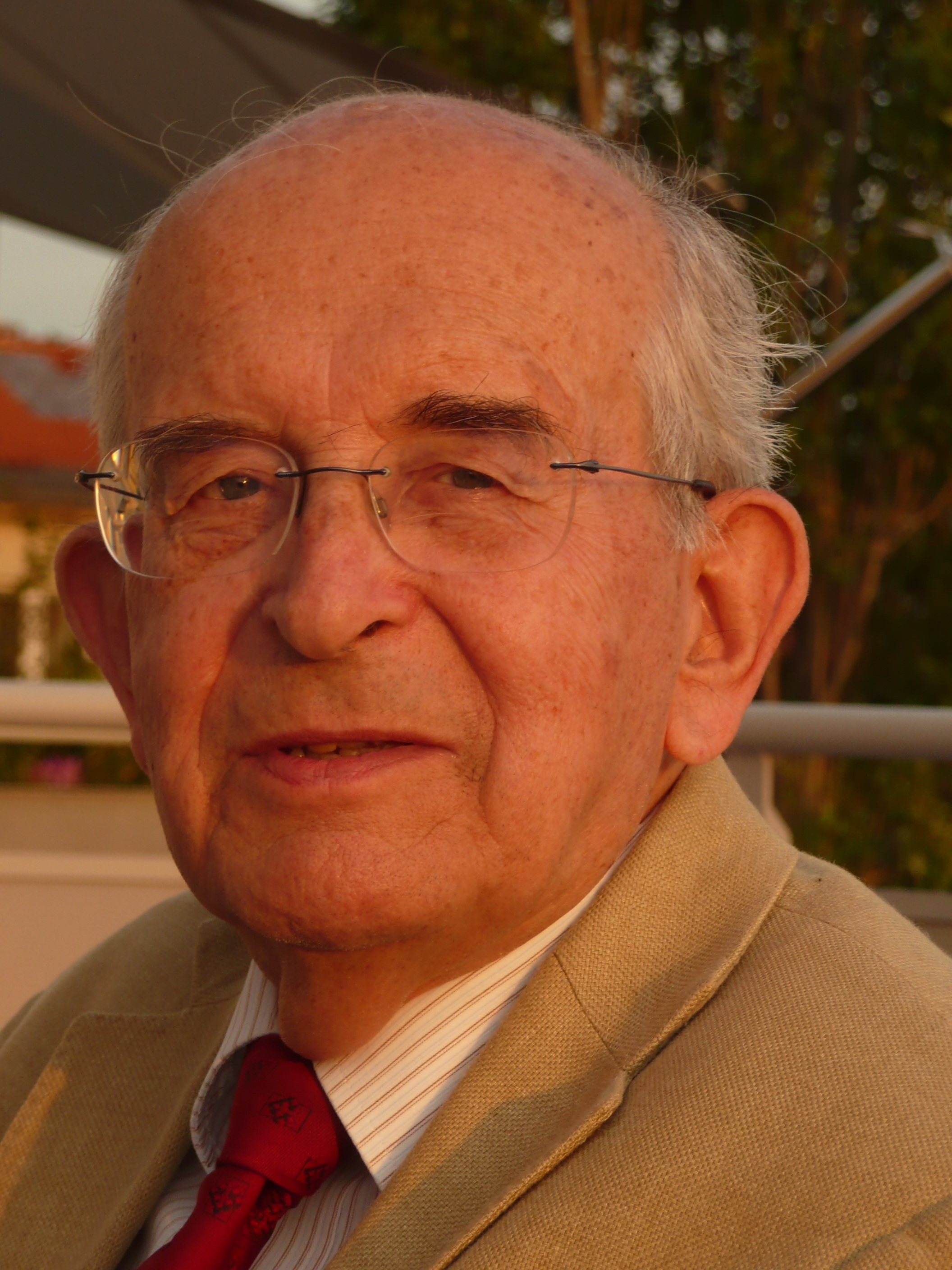
- Gerald Stourzh, 2008
- Born: May 15, 1929; Vienna, Austria
- Education: University of Vienna
- Known for: History of Austrian State Treaty; contributions to English and American history
- Spouse(s): Dr. Christiane Klingsland (d. 2004), Prof. Marlies Deskovic
- Children: Verena, Theresa, Katharina
- Awards: Fellow of the Royal Historical Society, London, and many others
- Scientific career
- Fields: Modern history
- Workplaces: University of Chicago, Institute for Advanced Study (Princeton), Free University of Berlin, University of Cambridge, University of Vienna
- Thesis: History of constitutions and of law (1951)

Gerald Stourzh (born 15 May 1929 in Vienna, Austria) is an Austrian historian who studies modern history, especially the history of North America, of Austria, of political ideas, of constitutions and especially of human rights. He taught, as a professor, at the Free University of Berlin from 1964 to 1969, and at the University of Vienna from 1969 until 1997, when he became professor emeritus.

== Life and scientific career ==
Gerald Stourzh, born in Vienna in 1929, was the only child of Herbert and Helene Stourzh (née Anderle). His parents were both University graduates (the father Lutheran, the mother Catholic). Gerald himself is Lutheran. As R.G. Plaschka wrote about him in an encomium in 1991, "there is something of his Lutheran ancestors, of his Lutheran heritage in him, when, confronted by a question of principle, he indicates, shrugging: Here I stand."

His mother, a practising gynecologist, had obtained her doctorate in 1915 when this was still quite unusual for a woman. His father had studied philosophy and made his living employed by the government of Lower Austria, but his real calling was that of a philosophical and political writer. As early as 1934, he wrote warningly about "National Bestialism", as he called National Socialism. After the Anschluss in 1940, the Gestapo started to investigate Herbert Stourzh, but his early death due to cancer in 1941 probably saved him from greater problems.

As Gerald Stourzh wrote in 2009, he owed two precious things to his parents: firstly the unconditional respect for scientific, mental pursuit in intellectual honesty, and secondly the unconditional respect for the human person, for the primacy of the single person versus super-individual entities: be it nation, or social position, or class, or people, or race.

Stourzh obtained his Matura at a Vienna Gymnasium in 1947. He then studied history for eight semesters, partly at the University of Vienna, partly at the University of Clermont-Ferrand in France and at the University of Birmingham in England. He was impressed by some of his teachers like Heinrich Benedikt or Hugo Hantsch, but influenced more by books (e.g., the books by Friedrich Meinecke and Josef Redlich). He obtained his degree Doctor of Philosophy at the University of Vienna in 1951 with a thesis in the field of the history of constitutions and of law, a field which remained his lifelong interest.

In 1951, he received an invitation - which he gladly accepted - by the political scientist Hans J. Morgenthau whom he had met before in Austria, to join him as a research assistant at the Center for the Study of American Foreign Policy of the University of Chicago, a center recently created by Morgenthau. As the only historian at this institute, Stourzh got the task of writing a book about Benjamin Franklin. After his official graduation (in absentia) at the University of Vienna, his position was upgraded to that of a research associate in the rank of instructor and later of assistant professor. Originally hired for a year, Stourzh eventually stayed in Chicago until 1958:- as a research associate until 1953, from 1953 to 1954 as William Rainey Harper Fellow in the Department of History, from 1954 to 1956 again as a research associate at the university, from 1956 to 1957 as a research associate at the American Foundation of Political Education, and in 1958 again at the university.

During this time, and with Morgenthau's permission, Stourzh also studied history and political science at the university and in the "Committee on Social Thought", for example with professors Leo Strauss (seminar on Machiavelli), Friedrich von Hayek (seminars on Tocqueville and on liberalism), Quincy Wright (international relations) and Hans Rothfels (nationality problems in central Europe). He was especially impressed by the historian William T. Hutchinson, in whose seminar he wrote an essay about Charles A. Beard that was published in 1957.

The most important result of his Chicago years was the book Benjamin Franklin and American Foreign Policy, that was published by the University of Chicago Press in the spring of 1954, before the author's 25th birthday. In 1955, this book received the prize of the American Institute of Early American History and Culture for the best book on early American history published in 1954. In the document accompanying the prize, it says, "...you have given us his [i.e, Franklin's] wisdom where he would most want us to have it, in our relation with the rest of the world. It is fitting that you, born and educated in Austria, should have crossed the Atlantic to teach this lesson." In 1962, Stourzh submitted the book on Franklin as a habilitation thesis at the University of Vienna.

In addition to that, the Chicago years led to several publications by the American Foundation of Political Education, co-edited by Stourzh. By the time Stourzh returned to Vienna in June, 1958, he had finished the first version of a book on Alexander Hamilton which was, however, not accepted for publication by the editor due to conflicting reviews. In view of his new professional duties, this book was finished only several years later, during a research stay 1966/67 at the Institute for Advanced Study in Princeton, and during his stay at the Free University of Berlin. The book was published as Alexander Hamilton and the Idea of Republican Government by Stanford University Press in 1970.

After rejecting an invitation for a one-year guest professorship by the University of California, Berkeley, Stourzh returned to Vienna in 1958 to organize the newly created Austrian Association for Foreign Policy and International Relations; he was its general secretary until 1962. In 1962, Stourzh passed his habilitation and became Docent for Modern History at the University of Vienna. In the same year, upon a suggestion by Bruno Kreisky, he entered Austria's Federal Ministry for European and International Affairs, where he had the desk of the Council of Europe. In 1963, he received a call from the Free University of Berlin to become a professor of Modern History, especially American history, and to head, at the same time, the section for American history at the newly founded John F. Kennedy-Institute for North American Studies of that University. He accepted the call and remained at the Free University until 1969, with an interruption due to a research stay at the Institute for Advanced Study in Princeton. In 1969, he became professor for Modern History at the University of Vienna, succeeding Friedrich Engel-Janosi. He has remained in that position until becoming professor emeritus in 1997.

Although remaining in contact with his Anglo-American research topics due to many lectures in the United States and a research stay as an "Overseas Fellow" at Churchill College of the University of Cambridge in 1976, Stourzh's research activity now followed two lines: firstly, the problem of the nationalities within the Habsburg monarchy, roughly between 1848 and 1918, the most important result being the book Die Gleichberechtigung der Nationalitäten in der Verfassung und Verwaltung Österreichs 1848-1918 (The equality before law of the nationalities in constitution and administration of Austria, 1848 - 1918), published in 1985; and secondly, the genesis of the Austrian State Treaty and of Austrian neutrality, and the end of allied occupation of Austria. The main result was a history of the Austrian State Treaty, that has been growing from 1975 to 2005 in altogether five editions with different titles (see Publications). Since the Nineties, continuing earlier studies, Stourzh has been studying the history of human rights in the western world.

In 1967/68, he was a member of the Institute for Advanced Study in Princeton. Since a research stay in 1976, he has been Overseas Fellow of the Churchill College at the University of Cambridge.

In 1962, Stourzh married Christiane Klingsland, Doctor of Law, in Vienna. She was a feminist and struggled for women's rights all her life. Three daughters came from this marriage: Verena, Theresa and Katharina. Christiane died in 2004. Since 2011, he has been married to Prof. Marie-Luise Deskovic (*8.8.1937 - †10.1.2016).

Gerald Stourzh is also an artist: his love of theater - that dates from his youth - brought him back on stage again: after 50 years, the same persons played the same piece (Der Zerrissene by Johann Nestroy) again, everyone acting the same part as before - this time for a caritative purpose. In his youth, as a cellist, he played chamber music with friends, and he also wrote an interpretation of the story La chute by Albert Camus.

== Selected publications ==
This list, taken from the full list of publications, lists mainly English-language publications. For the (much larger) list of German publications, see the German Wikipedia article on Gerald Stourzh.

- Benjamin Franklin and American Foreign Policy, University of Chicago Press 1954, 2.ed. 1969.
- Alexander Hamilton and the Idea of Republican Government, Stanford University Press 1970.
- Fundamental Laws and Individual Rights in the 18th Century Constitution, Claremont Institute, Montclair, CA, 1984, reprinted in: The American Founding, ed. by J. Jackson Barlow, Leonard W. Levy, Ken Masugi, Greenwood Press, Westport, CT, 1988.
- Um Einheit und Freiheit. Staatsvertrag, Neutralität und das Ende der Ost-West-Besetzung Österreichs 1945–1955 (For Unity and Freedom. State Treaty, Neutrality, and the End of Allied Occupation of Austria 1945-1955). Fifth, revised edition with a bibliographic epilogue, Böhlau, Vienna, 2005. ISBN 3-205-77333-0.
- Die Gleichberechtigung der Nationalitäten in der Verfassung und Verwaltung Österreichs 1848-1918, Verlag der Österreichischen Akademie der Wissenschaften, Wien 1985. ISBN 3-7001-0680-7.
- From Vienna to Chicago and Back. Essays on Intellectual History and Political Thought in Europe and America, University of Chicago Press, Chicago 2007. ISBN 978-0-226-77636-1. This volume contains important contributions on English and American history, notably: Constitution: Changing Meanings of the Term from the Early Seventeenth to the Late Eighteenth Century; William Blackstone: Teacher of Revolution; Liberal Democracy as a Culture of Rights: England, The United States and Continental Europe.
- Die moderne Isonomie. Menschenrechtsschutz und demokratische Teilhabe als Gleichberechtigungsordnung. Wien u.a. 2015. ISBN 978-3-205-20095-6

== Honors and prizes ==
- Corresponding member of the Austrian Academy of Sciences, 1974
- Overseas Fellow of the Churchill College at the University of Cambridge, 1976
- Member of the Austrian Academy of Sciences, 1983
- Fellow of the Royal Historical Society, London, 1988
- Honorary doctorate of Law, University of Graz, 1989.
- Doctor of Humane Letters h. c., The University of Chicago, 1992.
- Grand Decoration of Honour in Silver for services to the Republic of Austria, 1989
- Great gold medal of Styria, 1994
- Gold order of merit for service to Vienna, 1994
- Chevalier de l’ordre "Arts et Lettres" de la République française, 1997
- Chevalier of the order "Oranien-Nassau" of the Kingdom of the Netherlands, 1999
- Prize of the American Institute of Early American History and Culture for the best book on early American history published in 1954.
- Anton-Gindely Award for publications on culture, history and integration in Middle, East and Southeast Europe. 1998
- Karl-von-Vogelsang State Prize for Social Science of the Austrian Ministry for Science and Culture, 2000.
- Prize of the City of Vienna for Humanities and Social Science, 2004
- Science Prize of the Margaretha Lupac-Foundation for Parliamentarianism and Democracy, 2009.
- Kardinal-Innitzer-Preis, 2009.
- Establishment of the annual Gerald Stourzh-Lectures for the History of Human Rights and of Democracy by the Faculty of Historical and Cultural Studies of the University of Vienna, celebrating Stourzh's 80th birthday 2009.

== Literature ==
- Thomas Angerer, Birgitta Bader-Zaar, Margarete Grandner, Preface, in: Geschichte und Recht. Festschrift für Gerald Stourzh zum 70. Geburtstag, edited by the same persons, Böhlau, Vienna 1999, pp. 9–16, ISBN 3-205-99082-X
- Angelo Ara, Review of: Gerald Stourzh, Wege zur Grundrechtsdemokratie, in Rivista storica italiana, Vol. 104, 1992, pp. 876–884.
- John W. Boyer, Foreword, in: Gerald Stourzh, From Vienna to Chicago and Back, Chicago 2007, pp. XI-XIV. ISBN 978-0-226-77636-1.
- Wolfgang Mantl, "Gerald Stourzh und der Rechtsstaat", in: W. Mantl, Der österreichische Rechtsstaat zwischen habsburgischer Tradition und europäischer Zukunft, Savigny-Zeitschrift für Rechtsgeschichte, Germanistische Abteilung, Vol. 122, 2005, pp. 377–380. ISSN 0323-4045.
- Richard Georg Plaschka, "Gerald Stourzh zum 60. Geburtstag", in: Emil Brix, Josef Leidenfrost, Thomas Fröschl, eds., Geschichte zwischen Freiheit und Ordnung. Gerald Stourzh zum 60. Geburtstag. Styria, Graz 1991, pp. 13–24. ISBN 3-222-11870-1.
- Verleihung der Ehrendoktorwürde der Rechtswissenschaften an Herrn o. Univ.-Prof. Dr. phil. Gerald Stourzh. Grazer Universitätsreden, Vol. 41, Kienreich, Graz 1991.
