= Donald Pease =

Donald Pease may refer to:

- Donald E. Pease, professor of English, Dartmouth College and Director of the Futures of American Studies Institute
- Don Pease (Donald James Pease, 1931–2002), U.S. Representative from Ohio
