= Hubert Harrison: The Voice of Harlem Radicalism, 1883–1918 =

2008 book by Jeffrey B. Perry

- Cover
- Author: Jeffrey B. Perry
- Language: English
- Subject: Hubert Harrison, African Americans, Socialist Party of America, Harlem Renaissance
- Genre: Biography
- Publisher: Columbia University Press
- Publication date: November 2008
- Publication place: United States
- Media type: Print (hardcover and paperback), e-book
- Pages: 624
- ISBN: 978-0-231-13910-6
- OCLC: 213765367
- Followed by: Hubert Harrison: The Struggle for Equality, 1918–1927 (2020)

Hubert Harrison: The Voice of Harlem Radicalism, 1883–1918 is a 2008 biography by the independent scholar and author Jeffrey B. Perry. It is the first full-length biography of the Caribbean-born writer, orator, and political activist Hubert Harrison (1883–1927) and the first of a two-volume set; the second, Hubert Harrison: The Struggle for Equality, 1918–1927, was published by Columbia University Press in 2021. Perry narrates Harrison's life from his birth on St. Croix in the Danish West Indies through his 1900 emigration to New York City, his dismissal from the United States Post Office in 1911 after publishing letters critical of Booker T. Washington, Harrison's years as the leading African-American speaker and theoretician of the Socialist Party of America, his break with the party in 1914, and his founding in 1917 of the Liberty League and the newspaper The Voice, which initiated what Harrison called the "New Negro Movement". To Perry, Harrison is a "race conscious class radical" who joined class politics to anti-white-supremacist race politics and who, in the author's argument, provided the "key link" between the labor-and-civil-rights tradition later associated with A. Philip Randolph and Martin Luther King Jr. and the race-and-nationalist tradition later associated with Marcus Garvey and Malcolm X.

The biography was nominated for the Deutscher Memorial Prize and the Herbert Feis Award.

== Summary ==
Based on Harrison's diaries, correspondence, published writings, and manuscript collections in the United States and the Danish West Indies, Perry presents Harrison as a "race conscious class radical" who joined class politics with anti-white-supremacist race politics and became "the key link" between the Randolph–King labor-and-civil-rights tradition and the Garvey–Malcolm X race-and-nationalist tradition. The book is in three parts: Harrison's Caribbean background and New York self-education, his years inside the Socialist Party, and his founding of the "New Negro Movement" in wartime Harlem.

Perry starts the book on the Danish colonial island of St. Croix, where Harrison was born in 1883 to a Barbadian immigrant mother and an absentee Crucian father. (Note: Crucian means a person who is from Saint Croix, U.S. Virgin Islands.) Harrison grew up on an island whose enslaved population had freed itself in the 1848 uprising, in a local tradition of direct-action labor protest, and within a color line drawn far less rigidly than the American one. Harrison worked as a domestic servant, completed the ninth grade, and briefly taught before emigrating to New York as a seventeen-year-old orphan in 1900. There he finished high school at night and moved through the city's church-based lyceum circuit, becoming by his mid-twenties a respected public speaker and regular letter-writer to The New York Times.

Harrison's radicalism took shape through two ruptures. In 1911, the "Tuskegee Machine" engineered his dismissal from a post office clerkship after he published two letters criticizing Booker T. Washington. Harrison then became the Socialist Party of America's leading Black speaker and organizer in New York. He campaigned for Eugene V. Debs in 1912, founded the Colored Socialist Club as the party's first effort to organize African Americans, and argued in the New York Call that the party's duty to champion their cause was "the crucial test of Socialism's sincerity"—a formulation Perry notes predated W. E. B. Du Bois's similar claim. Perry documents the party's failures on race, including segregated Southern locals and its 1912 stance against Asian immigration, and follows Harrison's move toward the Industrial Workers of the World and his 1914 suspension after he backed the 1913 Paterson silk strike.

Between 1915 and 1917, Harrison's lectures (Note: Both indoors, on street corners, and at what he called the Temple of Truth.) shifted onto the racial aspects of the First World War, lynching, and disfranchisement. Perry identifies Harrison's Christmas Eve 1916 address "When the Negro Awakes" as the point at which the "New Negro Movement" took organized shape, years before the 1925 Alain Locke anthology attached the term to the Harlem Renaissance. In June 1917, Harrison founded the Liberty League of Negro-Americans and a month later launched the newspaper The Voice, which called openly for armed self-defense against mob violence. The volume closes in 1918 with Harrison co-chairing, alongside William Monroe Trotter, the Liberty Congress, the most significant African-American wartime protest against lynching, segregation, and disfranchisement.

Perry also viewed Harrison as a freethinker, theater critic (including a notice of The Emperor Jones that Eugene O'Neill praised), and builder of what became the Schomburg Center collection. He argues that the "race first" formulation usually credited to Garvey in fact originated with Harrison, who reasoned that because white people, including socialists, put their race first, African Americans were obliged to do the same. The biography is frank about Harrison's turbulent marriage, affairs, and chronic financial strain. Perry describes him as "the father of Harlem radicalism" (a title given by A. Philip Randolph) and attributes his obscurity to his early death aged forty-four and to a historiography that has underrepresented race-and-class radicals of Caribbean origin.

== Reviews ==
Wilson Jeremiah Moses called the biography "a brilliant masterpiece". Roughly a third of the six hundred pages were given over to notes and index, noted Moses, a proof, he argued, of Perry's "archival brilliance".

Jonathan M. Hansen described it a "magisterial piece of scholarship about an extraordinary man".

Carole Boyce Davies thought that the biography filled "an enormous gap in the knowledge of black activist intellectuals in the U.S." Boyce Davies welcomed Perry's refusal to idealise his subject, pointing to the book's frank treatment of Harrison's affairs, his uneven finances, and the hunger that his children sometimes knew.

In his review in American Communist History, Larry A. Greene predicted that the biography would stand as "the definitive work on Harrison"/ Quoting Perry's claim that Harrison was "the key link in the ideological unity of the two great trends of the Black Liberation Movement", Greene agreed with the author that Harrison's career bridges A. Philip Randolph's labor-and-civil-rights tradition and the race-and-nationalist tradition that ran through Garvey to Malcolm X.

For Michael N. Jagessar, the book is "more than a work of scholarship", it is "a belated act of generous recognition and restitution of a Black Caribbean scholar". Jagessar described Harrison as "a brilliant Caribbean mind, well ahead of its time, perhaps a postcolonial voice long before the theorists", and argued that his relative erasure amounted to a case study in triple marginalisation as poor, Black, and Caribbean.

LaShawn Harris credited Perry with advancing African-American historiography "by highlighting the less familiar radical politics of socialist Hubert Harrison".

The longest and most searching review came from Paul M. Heideman in Historical Materialism, who called the biography "truly monumental" and concluded that it had "secured Harrison's place in the history of American, and indeed international, radicalism." Heideman reconstructed Perry's argument that Harrison's anti-racist critique of American socialism had been more analytically coherent than any produced by the party's other leftists and had avoided conceptual traps (such as the later Communist "Black Belt" thesis) that entangled subsequent generations of American Marxists. He also raised two reservations: that Perry's sharp distinction between Harrison's "race-conscious radicalism" and the "class-first" radicalism he attributes to A. Philip Randolph and Chandler Owen does an injustice to the latter pair, who were "by any reasonable standard, race radicals" in their own right; and that Perry sometimes presents Harrison as more uniformly principled than the record allows, pointing to Harrison's cooperation with Major Walter H. Loving of Military Intelligence on the editorial that helped force W. E. B. Du Bois's army commission to be withdrawn. Heideman nevertheless closed by declaring that "every scholar of socialism, Black nationalism, or radical history owes Perry a debt of gratitude".
