= Jeffrey B. Perry =

American historian and labor activist (1946–2022)

- Born: Jeffrey Babcock Perry; October 10, 1946; The Bronx, New York, U.S.
- Died: September 24, 2022 (aged 75); Hackensack, New Jersey, U.S.
- Citizenship: American
- Occupations: Historian; Labor activist; Postal worker
- Known for: Two-volume biography of Hubert Harrison; Editions of Theodore W. Allen's The Invention of the White Race
- Spouse: Becky Hom
- Children: 1

Academic background
- Education: Princeton University (AB, 1968); Rutgers University (MA, 1976); Columbia University (MPhil, 1979; PhD, 1986)
- Doctoral advisor: Nathan Huggins, Hollis Lynch

Academic work
- Notable works: Hubert Harrison: The Voice of Harlem Radicalism, 1883–1918 (2008), Hubert Harrison: The Struggle for Equality, 1918–1927 (2020)
- Website: jeffreybperry.net

Jeffrey Babcock Perry (October 10, 1946 – September 24, 2022) was an American independent scholar, historian, and labor activist. He is best known for his two-volume biography of the Harlem writer and orator Hubert Harrison, and as the literary executor and editor of the historian Theodore W. Allen, author of the two-volume study The Invention of the White Race. Perry worked for 33 years as a United States Postal Service mail handler and union officer; he held a PhD in American history from Columbia University but never took a university faculty position.

Perry's scholarship centered on white supremacy as an obstacle to progressive social change in the United States, following Harrison and Allen. His two volumes on Harrison, Hubert Harrison: The Voice of Harlem Radicalism, 1883–1918 (2008) and Hubert Harrison: The Struggle for Equality, 1918–1927 (2020), were both published by Columbia University Press, which nominated the second for the Pulitzer Prize.

== Early life and education ==
Perry was born on October 10, 1946, in The Bronx, New York, into a working-class family that moved to Paramus, New Jersey, in the 1950s. At Paramus High School, he played baseball, basketball, and soccer, was a member of the school's Bergen County championship basketball (1963) and baseball (1964) teams, and was inducted into the school's athletic hall of fame.

Perry was the first in his family to attend college. He received his AB from Princeton University in 1968, where he majored in psychology and joined Students for a Democratic Society (SDS); he played varsity baseball and basketball in his first years at Princeton and belonged to the Quadrangle Club and the Ivy Club. He studied education at Harvard University (1968–1969), took an MA in labor studies from Rutgers University in 1976, and earned an MPhil (1979), and PhD (1986) in history from Columbia University. At Columbia, Nathan Huggins and Hollis Lynch directed his doctoral work on Hubert Harrison. (Note: Perry's own biographical sketch on jeffreybperry.net states that at Princeton he studied with Julian Jaynes, at Rutgers with Wells Keddie, and at Columbia with Alden Vaughan in addition to Huggins and Lynch.)

== Activism and labor career ==
After Princeton, Perry traveled in Mexico and South America, did draft resistance work in 1969, joined the Venceremos Brigade to Cuba in 1969–1970, and was active in the Puerto Rican Socialist Party in New Jersey from 1971 to 1974. He worked as copy editor for The Bergen Record in 1972, and 1974-5 instructor of labor history at Essex County College and Ramapo College.

From 1974 to 2007, Perry was a mail handler with the United States Postal Service and a member of Local 300 of the National Postal Mail Handlers Union, a division of the Laborers' International Union of North America (LIUNA). He was a shop steward, the union's elected administrative vice-president at the New Jersey and International Bulk Mail Center in Jersey City from 1984 to 1988, and elected treasurer of the Tristate Local 300 in New York City from 1988 to 2007. He edited rank-and-file, branch, local, and national union newspapers. The Postal Service dismissed Perry in 1978 after he led protests against a tentative collective-bargaining agreement, and reinstated him in 1979.

Outside postal work, Perry co-chaired the 1986 New Jersey state anti-apartheid parade. In 1988 he traveled to the West Bank and the Gaza Strip and testified before the Office of the United States Trade Representative on behalf of Palestinian trade unionists. In the 1980s he played for the Ronins, an interracial New York City softball team started by veterans of the 442nd Regimental Combat Team; teammates included Yuri Kochiyama's husband Bill and son Eddie, Eddie Lai of the Museum of Chinese in America, and members of the Soh Daiko taiko group.

== Scholarship ==
=== Hubert Harrison ===
Perry came across the writings of Hubert Harrison (1883–1927) during his doctoral research at Columbia, first reading Harrison's books on microfilm at the Schomburg Center for Research in Black Culture in Harlem, and made Harrison the subject of his dissertation. Working with Harrison's descendants—among them the grandsons Charles and Ray Richardson—Perry helped place the Hubert H. Harrison Papers at Columbia University's Rare Book and Manuscript Library. The Harrison family entrusted Perry as executor of the Harrison papers (long held in storage) which he then cataloged and edited into the Handheld Reader.

Perry edited A Hubert Harrison Reader (Wesleyan University Press, 2001) and the 2015 Diasporic Africa Press edition of Harrison's When Africa Awakes: The "Inside Story" of the Stirrings and Strivings of the New Negro in the Western World, writing a new introduction, biographical sketch, and supplementary notes for it.

Perry's biography of Harrison was published in two volumes: Hubert Harrison: The Voice of Harlem Radicalism, 1883–1918 (Columbia University Press, 2008) and Hubert Harrison: The Struggle for Equality, 1918–1927 (Columbia University Press, 2020). Columbia University Press nominated the first volume for the Deutscher Memorial Prize and the Herbert Feis Award, and the second for the Pulitzer Prize. Reviewing the first volume in Choice, the American Library Association librarian W. Glasker described it as "essential" and as doing "for Harrison what ... Rampersad ... [did] for Hughes".

Perry helped fund and arrange a marker for Harrison's previously unmarked grave at Woodlawn Cemetery in the Bronx; the marker bears the words "Speaker, Editor, Sage – What a change thy work hath wrought!", drawn from a poem by Andy Razaf.

=== Theodore W. Allen ===
Perry met the historian Theodore W. Allen (1919–2005) through political work in Hoboken, New Jersey, in the early 1970s and worked with him on his writings on race and class for the next three decades. In 1975, Perry printed and distributed Allen's essay "Class Struggle and the Origin of Racial Slavery: The Invention of the White Race" as a pamphlet; the Center for the Study of Working-Class Life at Stony Brook University reissued it in 2006 with a new introduction by Perry.

Allen named Perry as his literary executor and described him as "the individual most intimately acquainted with the development of the book's argument". After Allen's death in 2005, Perry edited and wrote new introductions and notes for the expanded second edition of Allen's The Invention of the White Race (two volumes, Verso Books, 2012) and for the third (composite) edition (Verso, 2021). He also edited Allen's posthumously published Class Struggle and the Origin of Racial Slavery: The Invention of the White Race (Center for the Study of Working-Class Life, 2006).

Perry placed the Theodore W. Allen Papers and parts of his own papers at the University of Massachusetts Amherst Special Collections and University Archives.

=== White identity as a system of bourgeois social control ===
Perry argued, following Harrison and Allen, that opposition to white supremacy has been central to progressive social change in the United States. After Allen, he described "white" identity as a system of bourgeois social control that the colonial Virginia and Maryland plantation class invented in response to labor solidarity between European and African workers in the seventeenth century.

== Personal life ==
Perry met Becky Hom in 1974. They married in 1988 and had one daughter, Perri. The family lived in Jersey City before settling in Westwood in 1991.

Perry died of issues related to advanced prostate cancer in Hackensack University Medical Center on September 24, 2022, at age 75.

== Selected publications ==
=== Books authored ===
- Perry, Jeffrey B. (2008). Hubert Harrison: The Voice of Harlem Radicalism, 1883–1918. New York: Columbia University Press. ISBN 978-0-231-13910-6.
- Perry, Jeffrey B. (2020). Hubert Harrison: The Struggle for Equality, 1918–1927. New York: Columbia University Press. ISBN 978-0-231-18262-1.

=== Books edited ===
- Perry, Jeffrey B., ed. (2001). A Hubert Harrison Reader. Middletown, CT: Wesleyan University Press. ISBN 978-0-8195-6473-3.
- Allen, Theodore W. (2012). Perry, Jeffrey B. (ed.). The Invention of the White Race, Volume 1: Racial Oppression and Social Control (2nd expanded ed.). London: Verso. ISBN 978-1-84467-769-6.
- Allen, Theodore W. (2012). Perry, Jeffrey B. (ed.). The Invention of the White Race, Volume 2: The Origin of Racial Oppression in Anglo-America (2nd expanded ed.). London: Verso. ISBN 978-1-84467-770-2.
- Harrison, Hubert H. (2015). Perry, Jeffrey B. (ed.). When Africa Awakes: The "Inside Story" of the Stirrings and Strivings of the New Negro in the Western World. New York: Diasporic Africa Press. ISBN 978-1-937306-29-8.

=== Selected articles ===
- Perry, Jeffrey B. (2010). "The Developing Conjuncture and Some Insights from Hubert Harrison and Theodore W. Allen on the Centrality of the Fight Against White Supremacy". Cultural Logic.
- Perry, Jeffrey B. and Charles Richardson (2022). "The Radicalization of Ray Richardson: Suspicion Still Surrounds Death of Black Activist TV Producer". Black Agenda Report.

== See also ==
- Hubert Harrison: The Voice of Harlem Radicalism, 1883–1918
- Hubert Harrison: The Struggle for Equality, 1918–1927
