= Winfried Fluck =

German academic (born 1944)

Winfried Fluck (born 1944) is a German academic.

He studied German, English and American literature at Freie Universität Berlin, Harvard University and the University of California, Berkeley. In 1972, he got his doctoral degree from Freie Universität Berlin with a dissertation on aesthetic premises in the literary criticism of Mark Twain’s Adventures of Huckleberry Finn. For his Habilitation, the European qualification for a professorship, he wrote a study on American realism as a form of “staged reality” (Inszenierte Wirklichkeit). After visiting scholarships at Harvard and Yale University, he got his first appointment as a professor at the University of Constance in Germany before he became Professor and Chair of North American Culture at the John F. Kennedy-Institute for North American Studies at Freie Universität Berlin. Winfried Fluck taught as a guest professor at Princeton University and the Universidad Autonoma Barcelona, and he was a research fellow at the National Humanities Center in North Carolina, the Advanced Studies Center of the Rockefeller Foundation in Bellagio, and the Internationales Kulturwissenschaftliches Zentrum in Vienna.

From 2005-2008, he was chair of the Research Reviewing Committee of the German Research Council on the humanities. He is a founding member of the Graduate School of North American Studies at Freie Universität Berlin, funded by the German Universities Excellence Initiative, and is directing it together with Ulla Haselstein. He is also co-director of the Futures of American Studies Institute at Dartmouth College established and directed by Donald E. Pease.

== Book publications ==
- Ästhetische Theorie und literaturwissenschaftliche Methode. Eine Untersuchung ihres Zusammenhangs am Beispiel der amerikanischen Huck Finn-Kritik (Stuttgart: Metzler, 1975).
- Populäre Kultur (Stuttgart: Metzler, 1979).
- Theorien amerikanischer Literatur (Konstanz: Universitätsverlag, 1987).
- Inszenierte Wirklichkeit. Der amerikanische Realismus 1865-1900 (München: Fink, 1992).
- Das kulturelle Imaginäre: Funktionsgeschichte des amerikanischen Romans, 1790-1900 (Frankfurt/Main: Suhrkamp, 1997).
- German? American? Literature? New Directions in German-American Studies, eds. Winfried Fluck and Werner Sollors (New York: Lang, 2002).
- Wie viel Ungleichheit verträgt die Demokratie? Armut und Reichtum in den USA, hrsg. Winfried Fluck und Welf Werner (Frankfurt/Main: Campus, 2003).
- Transnational American Studies. REAL – Yearbook of Research in English and American Literature 23 (2007), hrsg. Winfried Fluck, Stefan Brandt and Ingrid Thaler.
- Romance with America? Essays on Culture, Literature, and American Studies (Heidelberg: Winter, 2009).
