= Colleen Glenney Boggs =

American literature scholar

- Born: 1971 (age 54–55)

Academic background
- Education: University of Chicago
- Thesis: Transnationalism and American literature : literary translation 1773-1892 (2007)

Colleen Glenney Boggs (born 1971) is the Parents Distinguished Research Professor in the Humanities at Dartmouth College. In 2019, she was elected as a fellow of the American Antiquarian Society.

== Education and career ==
Boggs has a B.A. from Yale University, and earned an M.A. from the University of Chicago in 2001. In 2007, Boggs earned her Ph.D. from the University of Chicago where she wrote on transnationalism in American literature. From 2015 until 2016, Boggs was a fellow with the American Antiquarian Society / National Endowment for the Humanities. As of 2021, she is the Parents Distinguished Research Professor in the Humanities at Dartmouth College and serves as co director for Dartmouth's Summer Institute on Futures of American Studies.

Boggs is a scholar of nineteenth century American literature and specializes in literatures of the Civil War, animal studies, transatlantic, literary theory and gender. Reviews of her books have appeared in journals, including 2008 reviews of her book Transnationalism and American Literature: Literary Translation 1773–1892 and a review of her 2016 book on Teaching the literatures of the American Civil War.

In 2019, she was elected to membership in the American Antiquarian Society. She is currently launching a public humanities project (with Professors Carolyn Dever, Christie Harner, and Ivy Schweitzer): “There’s No Place Like Home: 19th Century Women Writers and the Opportunities of Home” addresses humanistic questions raised by the COVID pandemic.

== Selected publications ==
- Boggs, Colleen Glenney (2009-02-12). Transnationalism and American Literature: Literary Translation 1773–1892. New York: Routledge. doi:10.4324/9780203940792. ISBN 978-0-203-94079-2.
- Boggs, Colleen Glenney (2010). "American Bestiality: Sex, Animals, and the Construction of Subjectivity". Cultural Critique. 76 (76): 98–125. doi:10.1353/cul.2010.a402871. ISSN 0882-4371. JSTOR 40925347. S2CID 142817274.
- Boggs, Colleen (2013-01-08). Animalia Americana. Columbia University Press. doi:10.7312/bogg16122. ISBN 978-0-231-53194-8.
- Boggs, Colleen Glenney (2015). "The Civil War's "Empty Sleeve" and the Cultural Production of Disabled Americans". J19: The Journal of Nineteenth-Century Americanists. 3 (1): 41–65. doi:10.1353/jnc.2015.0007. ISSN 2166-7438. S2CID 159739479.
- Teaching the literatures of the American Civil War. Colleen Glenney Boggs. New York. 2016. ISBN 978-1-60329-275-7. OCLC 933438275.
- Patriotism by Proxy: The Civil War Draft and the Cultural Formation of Citizen-Soldiers, 1863-1865 (Oxford University Press, 2020) ISBN 978-0-19-886367-0
- "Introduction to 'Poetics of Fact, Politics of Fact'"—a "theories and methodologies" essay cluster co-edited with Chenxi Tang (Berkeley), PMLA 134.5 (2019): 1109–1114.

== Awards and honors ==
Boggs was elected a member of the American Antiquarian Society in 2019.
