= Amy Kaplan =

American academic (1953–2020)

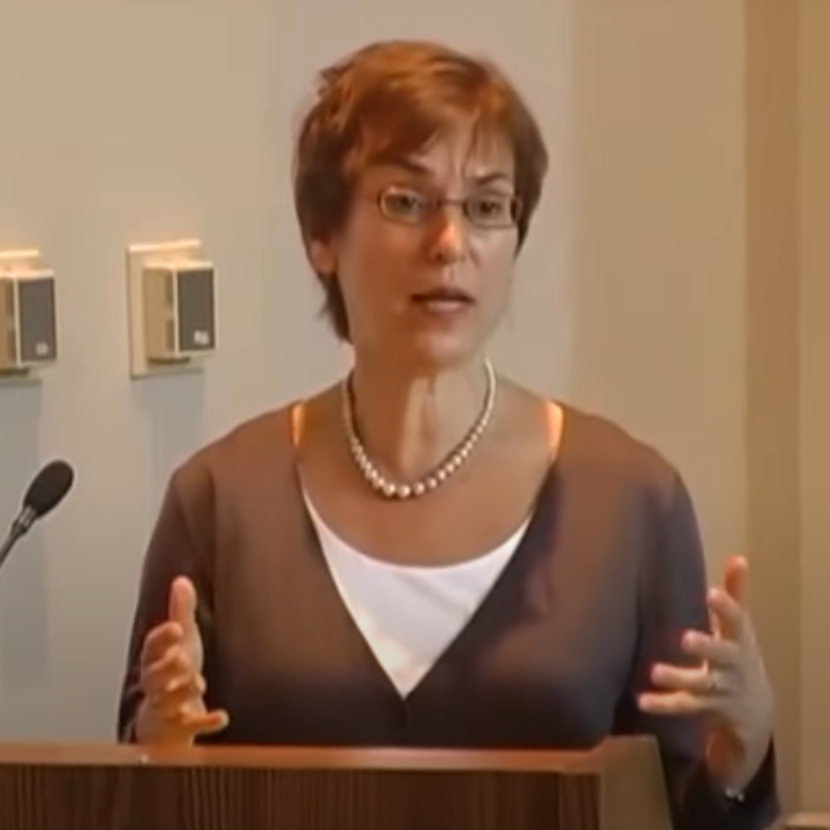
- Amy Kaplan delivering a lecture in 2010
- Born: September 10, 1953
- Died: July 30, 2020 (aged 66)
- Awards: Norman Forster prize for the best essay in American Literature (1998)

Academic background
- Education: Brandeis University, Johns Hopkins University
- Thesis: Realism against itself: the urban fictions of Twain, Howells, Dreiser, and Dos Passos (1982)

Academic work
- Institutions: Mount Holyoke College, University of Pennsylvania
- Main interests: American culture, literature, policy, and imperialism.
- Notable works: The Social Construction of American Realism (1988); The Anarchy of Empire in the Making of U.S. Culture (2002).
- Website: https://www.english.upenn.edu/people/amy-kaplan

Amy Kaplan (September 10, 1953 – July 30, 2020) was an American academic working in the interdisciplinary field of American Studies, her work focused on the critical study of the culture of imperialism, prison writing, mourning, memory, and war. Kaplan was Edward W. Kane Professor of English at the University of Pennsylvania, and president of the American Studies Association in 2003.

== Early life and education ==
Kaplan was born in New York City and grew up in New Rochelle. She graduated summa cum laude from Brandeis University with a BA. She completed her PhD at Johns Hopkins University, where she researched late-nineteenth-century American literature. Her 1982 thesis was titled "Realism against itself: the urban fictions of Twain, Howells, Dreiser, and Dos Passos".

== Career ==
Kaplan began her career teaching at Yale University. In 1994, Kaplan co-edited Cultures of United States Imperialism with Donald E. Pease, a book which has been credited with marking "a paradigm shift for the field of American Studies, forcing scholars to contend with the United States' imperialist history".

Kaplan was a professor of English and chair of the American Studies program at Mount Holyoke College before joining the department of English at the University of Pennsylvania in 2003. In 2006, Kaplan became Edward Kane Professor of English. For the 2011–12 academic year, Kaplan was a member of the school of social sciences at the Institute for Advanced Study in Princeton, New Jersey.

== Death ==
Kaplan died on July 30, 2020 of glioblastoma.

== Selected works ==
- Kaplan, Amy. The Social Construction of American Realism. The University of Chicago Press, (1988).
- Kaplan, Amy. "Romancing the empire: The embodiment of American masculinity in the popular historical novel of the 1890s." American Literary History 2.4 (1990): 659–690.
- Kaplan, Amy, and Donald E. Pease. Cultures of United States Imperialism. Duke University Press, (1993).
- Kaplan, Amy. "Manifest domesticity." American literature 70.3 (1998): 581–606.
- Kaplan, Amy. "Homeland insecurities: Some reflections on language and space." Radical History Review 85.1 (2003): 82–93.
- Kaplan, Amy. "Violent Belongings and the Question of Empire Today." American Quarterly 56.1 (2004): 1-18.
- Kaplan, Amy. "Where is Guantanamo?." American Quarterly 57.3 (2005): 831–858.
- Kaplan, Amy. The Anarchy of Empire in the Making of U.S. Culture. Harvard University Press, (2005).
- Kaplan, Amy. Our American Israel: The Story of an Entangled Alliance. Harvard University Press, (2018).
