= Theodore W. Allen =

American writer (1919–2005)

- Born: Theodore William Allen; August 23, 1919; Indianapolis, Indiana, U.S.
- Died: January 19, 2005 (aged 85); Crown Heights, Brooklyn, New York, U.S.
- Occupations: Writer, communist activist, union worker
- Writing career
- Language: English
- Subjects: Class struggle, postcolonial studies, whiteness studies

Theodore William Allen (August 23, 1919 – January 19, 2005) was an American independent scholar, writer, and activist, best known for his pioneering writings since the 1960s on white skin privilege and the origin of white identity. His major theoretical work The Invention of the White Race was published in two volumes: Racial Oppression and Social Control (1994) and The Origin of Racial Oppression in Anglo-America (1997). The central ideas of this opus however, appeared in much earlier works such as his seminal Class Struggle and the Origin of Racial Slavery: The Invention of the White Race, published as a pamphlet in 1975, and in expanded form the following year. He claimed that the notion of white race was invented as "a ruling class social control formation."

Allen did research for the next quarter century to expand and document his ideas, particularly on the alleged relation of white supremacy to the working class.

== Early life and education ==
Theodore William Allen was born into a middle-class family in Indianapolis, Indiana. He had a sister Eula May and brother Tom; their parents were Thomas E. Allen, a sales manager, and Almeda Earl Allen, a housewife. The family moved when he was a child to Paintsville, Kentucky, and then to Huntington, West Virginia, where he lived and, in his words, "was proletarianized" during the Great Depression. When Allen started working soon after high school (deciding that college did not do enough for independent thought), he quickly joined labor unions.

== Career ==
=== Labor ===
Allen became an early activist and organizer in the labor movement. At age 17, he joined the American Federation of Musicians Local 362 and the Communist Party, and soon was elected as a delegate to the Huntington Central Labor Union, AFL. He subsequently worked as a coal miner in West Virginia as a member of the United Mine Workers, serving as an organizer and president of one Local and later member of another. He also co-developed a trade union organizing program for the Marion County, West Virginia Industrial Union Council, CIO.

In the 1940s Allen moved to New York City, a center for labor activism and intellectual work. He did industrial economic research at the Labor Research Association, based in the city. He taught economics at the Jefferson School of Social Science, founded in New York by the Communist Party in 1944. Allen taught there into the 1950s, when the school closed, due to declining membership in the party and pressure from scrutiny by the House Un-American Activities Committee (HUAC) of the United States House of Representatives, which was conducting hearings during the McCarthy era.

Allen also taught math at the Crown Heights Yeshiva in Brooklyn, where he lived, and the Grace Church School in New York. During his more than six decades in New York, Allen had a variety of jobs, from factory worker to retail clerk, mechanical design draftsman, postal mail handler (and member of the Local of the National Postal Mail Handlers Union), and librarian at the Brooklyn Public Library.

Beginning in 1965, he was published as an independent scholar. He conducted decades of research to develop his ideas about the labor, class and racial history of the United States.

=== Writing ===
In 1965 Allen published articles on the concept of white skin privilege for all classes of whites, examining the relation of the working class to white supremacy. He explored this in "White Blindspot" and Can White ~~Workers~~ Radicals Be Radicalized? (1967, 1967), co-authored with Noel Ignatiev.

After beginning his research on "white skin privilege" in 1965, Allen worked for the next decade to develop more research and writing on this topic. He published Class Struggle and the Origin of Racial Slavery: The Invention of the White Race (1975). During this time, he also taught as an adjunct history instructor for one semester at Essex County Community College in Newark, New Jersey. He was described by historian Jeffrey B. Perry as working "throughout his entire adult life ... for the emancipation of the working class and for socialism."

His work since the 1960s was intended to overturn explanations for white supremacy that relied on biology or attributed it to benefits gained by the working class. Allen emphasized that the "invention of the white race" was related to class struggle and to ruling class efforts to maintain social control.

Allen published outside the academic press and his work was highly influential, at a time of the civil rights movement, when issues of race, ethnicity and culture were being studied and overturned. He also documented how later Irish immigrants to the U.S. became "white." The concept of "race" was also being overturned by work in anthropology, genetics, biology, history and other disciplines. By 1997, historian George M. Fredrickson of Stanford University wrote that "the proposition that race is 'a social and cultural construction,' has become an academic cliché," but Allen was not satisfied with that proposition and he emphasized that "the 'white race' must be understood, not simply as a social construct (rather than a genetic phenomenon), but as a ruling class social control formation."

== Works ==
- — (1975). Class Struggle and the Origin of Racial Slavery: The Invention of the White Race (PDF). Stony Brook, NY: Center for the Study of Working Class Life, SUNY, Stony Brook (published 2006). OCLC 244189582. With an "Introduction" by Jeffrey B. Perry.
- —; Ignatin (Ignatiev), Noel (1967–1973). "White Blindspot" (PDF). In Davidson, Carl (ed.). Revolutionary Youth & the New Working Class: the Praxis Papers, the Port Authority Statement, the RYM Documents and Other Lost Writings of SDS. Pittsburgh, Pennsylvania: Changemaker Publications (published 2011). pp. 148–181. ISBN 9781257999477.

Reproduction of three pamphlets:
- Ignatin, Noel (March 1967). "Letter to Progressive Labor" (PDF). New York. pp. 148–163.
- — (1967). "A Letter of Support" (PDF). Brooklyn, New York. pp. 163–167.
- — (1967). "Can White ~~Workers~~ Radicals Be Radicalized?" (PDF). Ann Arbor, Michigan. pp. 167–181.
- — (1973). "White Supremacy in U.S. History" (PDF). New York, New York. pp. 167–181.

- — (1994). The Invention of the White Race: Volume 1, Racial Oppression and Social Control. London: Verso Books (published 2012). ISBN 9781844677696.
- — (1997). The Invention of the White Race: Volume 2, The Origin of Racial Oppression in Anglo-America. London: Verso Books (published 2012). ISBN 9781844677702.
- — (Spring 1998). "Summary of the Argument of "The Invention of the White Race" (Part One)" (PDF). Cultural Logic: Marxist Theory and Practice. 1 (2). Theodore W. Allen.
- — (Spring 1998). "Summary of the Argument of "The Invention of the White Race" (Part Two)" (PDF). Cultural Logic: Marxist Theory and Practice. 1 (2). Theodore W. Allen.
- — (Spring 1998). "In Defense of Affirmative Action in Employment Policy" (PDF). Cultural Logic: Marxist Theory and Practice. 1 (2). Theodore W. Allen.
- — (2009). "'Race' and 'Ethnicity': History and the 2000 Census" (PDF). Cultural Logic: Marxist Theory and Practice. 3 (1–2). Theodore W. Allen.
- — (Spring 2001). "On Roediger's Wages of Whiteness" (PDF). Cultural Logic: Marxist Theory and Practice. 4 (2). Theodore W. Allen. Archived from the original (PDF) on 2020-06-06.
- — (2004). "Base and Superstructure and the Socialist Perspective". Socialism and Democracy (43). Archived from the original on 2020-06-06.
- — (2005). "Commentary on István Mészáros's Beyond Capital" (PDF). Cultural Logic: Marxist Theory and Practice (2). Theodore W. Allen.
