= Christian Lammert =

German political scientist

Christian Lammert (born 10 January 1969) is a German political scientist.

== Life ==
Born in Offenbach am Main, Lammert teaches as professor for North American domestic policy at the John F. Kennedy Institute for North American Studies of the Free University of Berlin and is research associate at the Zentrum für Nordamerika-Forschung (ZENAF) of the Goethe University Frankfurt.

Lammert received his doctorate in 2002 with his dissertation Regional Movements and State Power in Canada and France at the Faculty of social science of the University of Frankfurt am Main. From 2001 to 2008 he was a research assistant at ZENAF and at the Chair of political science with a focus on "Comparative Politics". (Hans-Jürgen Puhle).

Lammert's research interests include comparative politics, political systems in Canada and US, comparative welfare state research, tax and social policy, nationalism research, and multiculturalism.

Since 2017, Lammert has been head of the "Political Science and Sociology" section in the Society for Canadian Studies.

== Monographs and anthologies ==
- Politik in den USA. Institutionen – Akteure – Themen. Published with Christoph M. Haas/Simon Koschut. Kohlhammer, Stuttgart 2018
- Sozialpolitik in den USA. Eine Einführung, with Britta Grell. Springer VS, Wiesbaden 2013
- Travelling Concepts. Negotiating Diversity in Canada and Europe. Edited with Katja Sarkowsky (Conference publication of a Deutsche Forschungsgemeinschaft-funded international and interdisciplinary conference of April 2007), VS-Verlag 2010
- Nationale Bewegungen in Québec and Corsica 1960–2000. Campus, Frankfurt 2004
- Staat, Nation, Demokratie. Tradition und Perspektiven moderner Gesellschaften. Published with Marcus Gräser, Söhnke Schreyer. Vandenhoeck & Ruprecht, Göttingen 2001
