= Eric Lott =

American cultural historian and academic (born 1959)

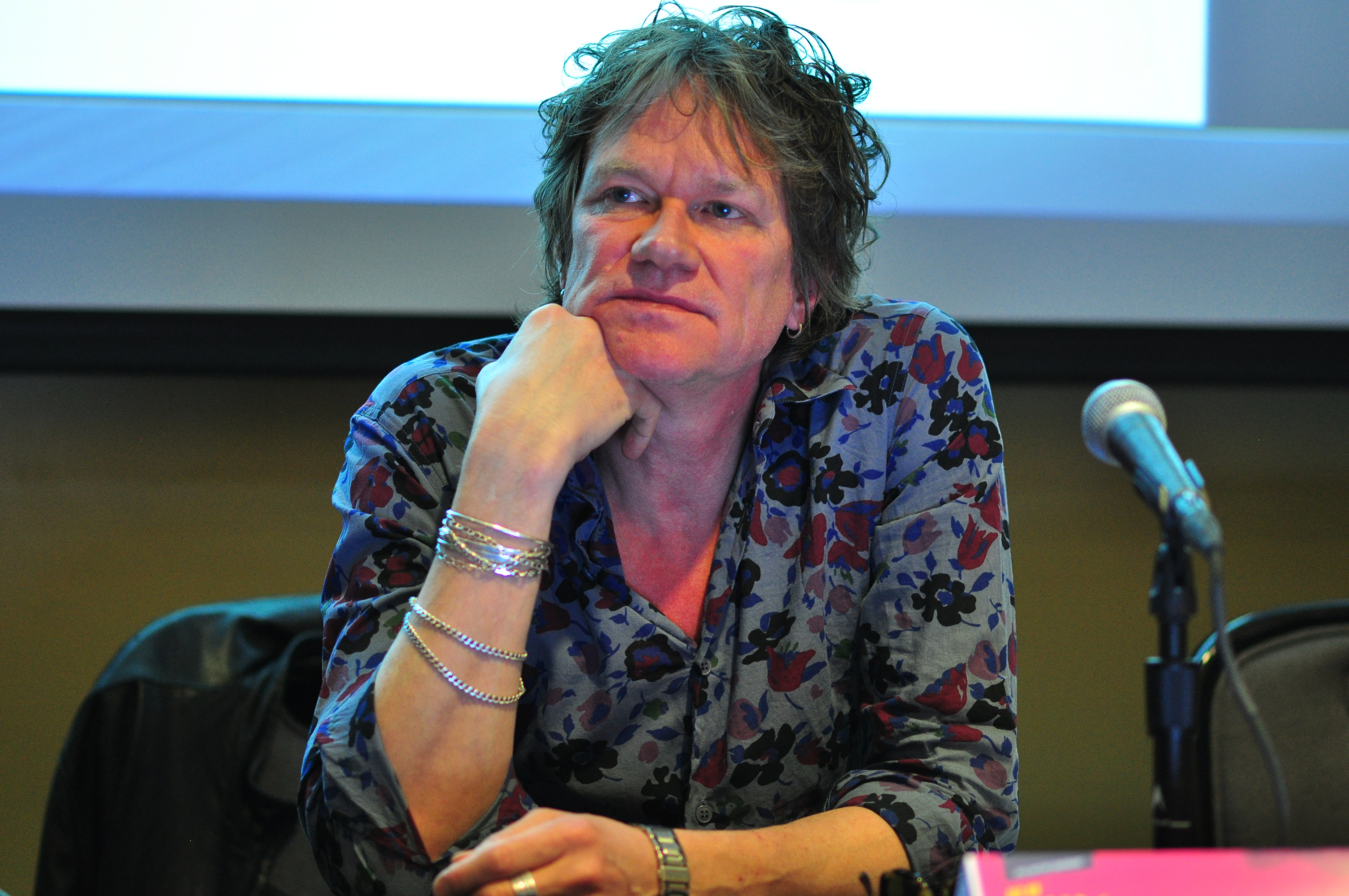
- Lott at the Seattle Pop Conference 2015
- Born: 1959 (age 66–67)
- Occupation: Distinguished Professor of English
- Awards: MLA's "Best First Book" (1994), Outstanding Book on the Subject of Human Rights by the Gustavus Myers Center for the Study of Human Rights (1994), Avery O. Craven Award from the Organization of American Historians (1994)

Academic background
- Education: Columbia University

Academic work
- Discipline: American Studies, African American Literature and Culture
- Institutions: The Graduate Center, CUNY
- Notable works: Love and Theft: Blackface Minstrelsy and the American Working Class (1993), Black Mirror: The Cultural Contradictions of American Racism (2017)

Eric Lott (born 1959) is an American cultural historian and Distinguished Professor of English at The Graduate Center, CUNY in New York City. The son of Richard L. (an attorney) and Judith K. (an administrator) Lott, Eric Lott was previously a faculty member in the Department of English at the University of Virginia.

Lott received his Ph.D. in 1991 from Columbia University. His book about the origins, evolution, and cultural significance of blackface minstrelsy, Love and Theft: Blackface Minstrelsy and the American Working Class (1993), received the 1994 Avery O. Craven Award from the Organization of American Historians and the first annual Modern Language Association's "Best First Book" prize, and the 1994 Outstanding Book on the Subject of Human Rights by the Gustavus Myers Center for the Study of Human Rights. In 2022, Lott was awarded a Senior Fellowship of the Zukunftskollegs at the University of Konstanz.

Love and Theft extensively documents the racism and cultural appropriation inherent in blackface performance; Lott also argues that it demonstrates a current of homosexual desire for Black men's bodies; he also argues that "mixed in with vicious parodies and lopsided appropriation, minstrelsy involved a real love of African American culture."

Bob Dylan is widely reported to have taken the title of his album Love and Theft from that of Lott's book; Lott, in turn, considered his own title "a riff on" Leslie Fiedler's Love and Death in the American Novel.

His writing has also appeared in numerous publications, such as Village Voice, The Nation, Transition, and American Quarterly. He is one of the co-directors of the Futures of American Studies Institute at Dartmouth College.

Lott's latest book, Black Mirror, extends his views on the contradictions of American racism to more contemporary themes, including the presidency of Barack Obama, Elvis impersonation, and Dylan's Love and Theft. The analysis in the book is heavily driven by Marxist analysis regarding "surplus value," which is extended to an analysis of the "symbolic capital" of cultural appropriation.

== Books ==
- The Disappearing Liberal Intellectual (2006)
- Love and Theft: Blackface Minstrelsy and the American Working Class (1993; 2nd ed., 2013)
- Black Mirror: The Cultural Contradictions of American Racism (2017)
