= Sabine Fischer (political scientist) =

German political scientist

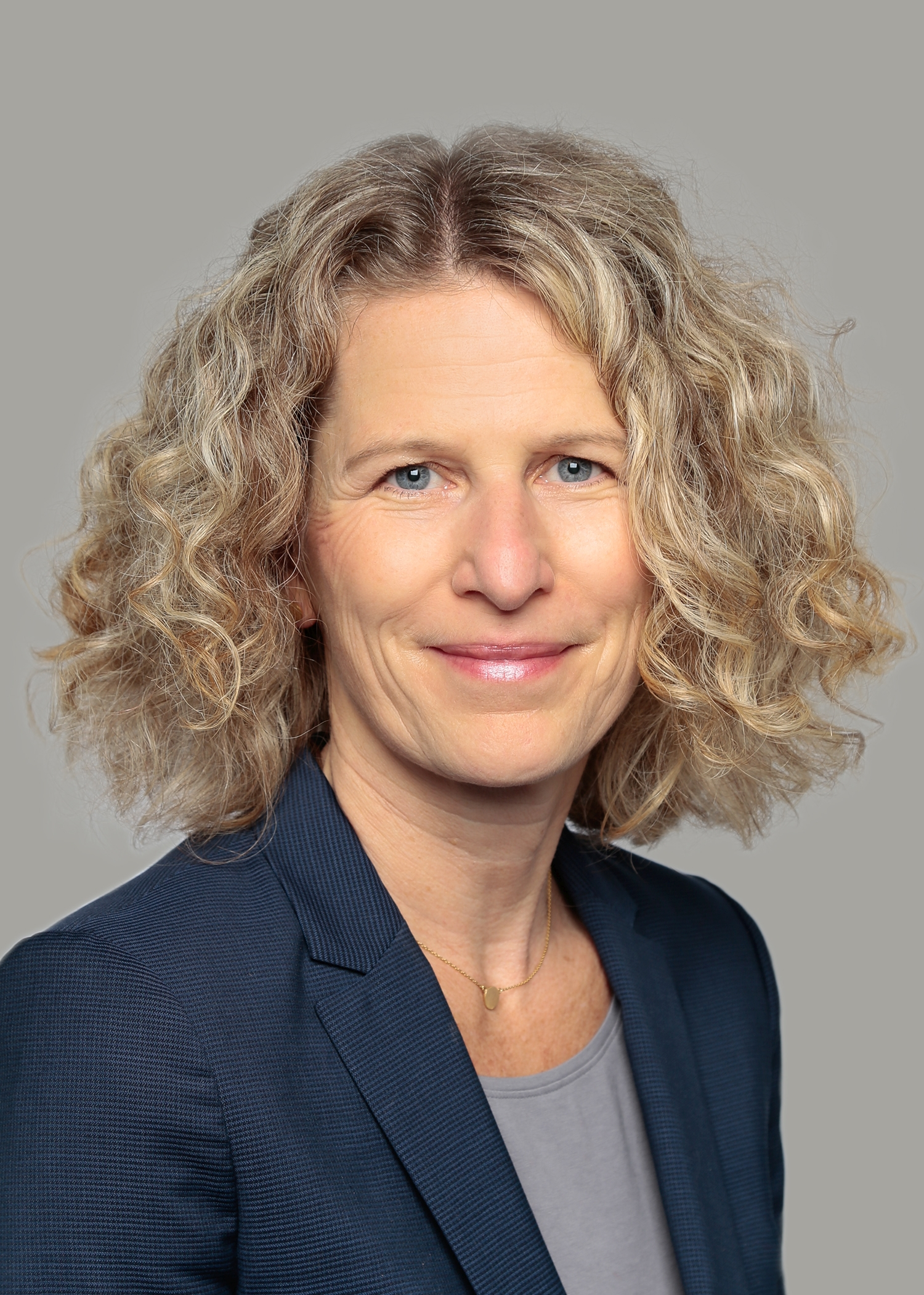
Fischer in 2021

Sabine Fischer (born 1969) is a German political scientist. She currently works at the German Institute for International and Security Affairs as a specialist in Russian foreign and security policy, EU-Russia relations, unresolved conflicts in the east region of the EU, and regional relations between East Europe and Eurasia. She has published several books, articles and studies on her core topic of Eastern Europe. She advises the German Federal Government, and her expertise was and is often sought in interviews and television appearances, especially during the Russian invasion of Ukraine.

== Life and career ==
Fischer completed her doctorate in 2002 with a thesis about The Importance of Identity Discourses for Russian Foreign Policy at the Goethe University Frankfurt.

Fischer worked from 1997 to 2006, initially at the Peace Research Institute Frankfurt, then at the Mannheim Center for European Social Research, and for the Institute for East European Studies of Free University of Berlin. From 2007 to 2012, Fischer worked as a Research Fellow at the European Union Institute for Security Studies in Paris. From 2012 to 2018, she was the leader of the East Europe and Eurasia Research Group at the German Institute for International and Security Affairs in Berlin. In May 2015, she worked at the Carnegie Moscow Center, as a Visiting Fellow. From 2012 to 2018, Fischer was the team leader of the "Public Diplomacy. EU and Russia" project in collaboration with the Goethe-Institut in Moscow. She has worked as a Senior Fellow of the East Europe and Eurasia Research Group of the German Institute for International and Security Affairs in Berlin since May 2021.

Fischer has been a member of the executive board of the German Association for East European Studies (DGO) since 2014 and its managing director since 2021. She has been a member of the Petersburger Dialogs e.V. since 2015, and a member of the advisory board of the "FES Regional Office for Cooperation and Peace in Europe" of the Friedrich Ebert Foundation in Vienna since 2016. Since 2017, she has been a member of the scientific advisory board of the Russian Analytical Digest published by several German Eastern European institutes (University of Bremen, German Association for East European Studies, Leibniz Institute) and since 2021 she has been a member of the Europe/Transatlantic Advisory Board of the Heinrich Böll Foundation.
