= Institute for East European Studies =

Teaching and research institution in Berlin

- Osteuropa-Institut
- Type: Institute
- Established: 1951
- Affiliation: Free University of Berlin
- Location: Berlin, Germany
- Website: www.oei.fu-berlin.de

The Institute for East European Studies (German: Osteuropa-Institut, abbreviated OEI) of the Free University of Berlin is an interdisciplinary teaching and research institution specializing in the region of Eastern, Southeastern and Central Eastern Europe. Along with the Institute for Latin American Studies and the John F. Kennedy Institute for North American Studies, it is one of three interdisciplinary so-called central institutes at the Free University of Berlin that specialize in regional studies. The researched disciplines include sociology, history, cultural studies, politics and economics.

Founded in 1951 during the Cold War, the OEI is located in Dahlem in south-western Berlin, as are most of the Free University of Berlin's institutions. It was among the first institutions focused on East European Studies in West Berlin and West Germany.

It offers the master's programs in East European Studies. Also East European Studies online master program has been offered since 2003. It also has a specialized library with 360,000 volumes, which since 2008 together with the libraries of the Department of Political and Social Sciences has formed the Library of Social Sciences and East European Studies. In addition to the biannual brochure Berliner Osteuropa-Info, the research results of the institute's departments are published in the Working Paper(s) of the Institute for East European Studies.
