= John Carlos Rowe =

American academic and author

- Occupations: Academic and author

Academic background
- Education: Johns Hopkins University; State University of New York at Buffalo
- Thesis: Restless Analysts: Henry Adams and Henry James. A Study in the Function of Modern Symbolism

John Carlos Rowe is an American academic, historian, and author. He is a professor emeritus at the University of California, Irvine as well as the USC Associates' Professor of the Humanities and Professor of English, American Studies and Ethnicity, and Comparative Literature at the University of Southern California.

Rowe is most known for his contributions in the field of new American studies, with a focus on Henry James, the intersection of nineteenth-century American literature and postmodern theory, and the critique of U.S. imperialism. Among his authored works are his publications in academic journals, including PMLA and Cultural Critique as well as books such as At Emerson's Tomb: The Politics of Classic American Literature and Literary Culture and U.S. Imperialism.

== Education ==
Rowe received his Bachelor of Arts in 1967 from the Johns Hopkins University. Later in 1972, he obtained a Doctor of Philosophy in English from the State University of New York at Buffalo.

== Career ==
Rowe began his academic journey in 1971 at the University of Maryland, where he served as an assistant professor until 1975. He held a senior Fulbright scholar position at the Universität des Saarlandes from 1974 to 1975. In 1975, he transitioned to the University of California, Irvine, initially as an assistant professor from 1975 to 1977, followed by an appointment as an associate professor from 1977 to 1981. Subsequently, he held the position of professor from 1981 to 2004. Since 2004, he has held the title of professor emeritus at the University of California, Irvine, and the USC Associates' Professor of the Humanities at the University of Southern California. He held distinguished visiting professorship at the American University of Cairo in 2011.

At the University of Southern California, he chaired the Department of American Studies and Ethnicity from 2008 to 2011, 2018 to 2021, and 2022 to 2023.

== Works ==
Rowe's works explore the intersections of postmodern theory, U.S. imperialism, and nineteenth-century American literature. In his 1997 book, At Emerson's Tomb: The Politics of Classic American Literature, he revisited the writings of Poe, Melville, and Emerson, assessing the impact of these prominent authors' perspectives on race, class, and gender on the specific political changes in nineteenth and twentieth-century American society. His book Literary Culture and U.S. Imperialism examines the critical and contributory responses of various American literary figures, spanning from the late eighteenth century to the 1940s, to U.S. imperialism, considering both the content of their works and the broader public and cultural reactions to imperialist ventures. While reviewing the book, William M. Morgan commended his efforts and said This work is often trenchant and erudite, subtle in its treatment of ideology, and clear about its theoretical underpinnings and wide-ranging subject matter. Just as important, it should be an extremely helpful resource for teachers who are interested in activist pedagogy and social change. His 2011 book Afterlives of Modernism: Liberalism, Transnationalism, and Political Critique explores the relationship between early 20th-century modernist writers and liberalism, advocating for a nuanced perspective that acknowledges liberalism's successes while critiquing neoliberal trends and emphasizing the transnational engagement and socially engaged intent of these writers in addressing the concerns of marginalized groups.

Focusing on American Studies, his book The New American Studies (2002) called for the reinvention of the field, advocating for a more theoretically informed, post-nationalist approach that draws on insights from cultural critics and various scholarly disciplines. His 2012 publication The Cultural Politics of the New American Studies examined how neoliberal ideology has employed cultural issues to justify a new American Exceptionalism supporting U.S. global expansion. The book also explored the challenges of critiquing neoliberalism amid media influences, advocating for a reconceived role of the public intellectual in navigating diverse media as a social critic.

Much of Rowe's works revolves around Henry James, an American British Author. In his 1984 book titled The Theoretical Dimensions of Henry James he examined James from diverse perspectives, such as the psychology of literary influence, Marxism, feminism, psychoanalysis, literary phenomenology, and deconstruction. In doing so, he transformed James's literary masterpieces into focal points where various modern critical theories intersect. His book The Other Henry James (1998) presents a redefined perspective on Henry James, portraying him not as an elitist formalist, but as a socially sensitive critic engaged with and critical of the perplexing and oppressive societal issues of his era. His 2022 book, Our Henry James in Fiction, Film, and Popular Culture, offered an examination of Henry James's continued impact on popular culture, highlighting both the adaptability of his works in film and their ongoing relevance in discussions about social changes, gender and sexuality, and other contemporary issues.

In addition, Rowe's written works have focused on a range of themes, notably, including post nationalism, globalism, US imperialism and globalization.

In recent years, Rowe has focused on indigenous studies in North America and the transpacific region, publishing work on such authors as Sarah Winnemucca and Craig Santos Perez.

== Awards and honors ==
- 1981 – Distinguished Teaching Award, University of California, Irvine
- 1982–1983 – Fellow, Rockefeller Foundation
- 2004–2007 – Elected Member, National Council, American Studies Association

== Bibliography ==
=== Authored ===
- Henry Adams and Henry James: The emergence of a modern consciousness (1976) ISBN 9780801409547
- Through the Custom-House: Nineteenth-Century American Fiction and Modern Theory (1982) ISBN 9780801826771
- The Theoretical Dimensions of Henry James (1984) ISBN 9780299099749
- At Emerson's Tomb: The Politics of Classic American Literature (1997) ISBN 9780231058957
- The Other Henry James (New Americanists) (1998) ISBN 9780822321477
- Literary Culture and U.S Imperialism: From the Revolution to World War II (2000) ISBN 9780195131512
- The New American Studies (2002) ISBN 9780816635788
- Afterlives of Modernism: Liberalism, Transnationalism, and Political Critique (2011) ISBN 9781584659969
- The Cultural Politics of the New American Studies (2012) ISBN 9781785420078
- Our Henry James in Fiction, Film, and Popular Culture. (2022) ISBN 9781032286808

=== Edited ===
- The Vietnam War and American Culture (1991) ISBN 9780231067324
- Post-Nationalist American Studies. Berkeley: University of California Press. (2000) ISBN 9780520224391
- Selected Writings of Ralph Waldo Emerson and Margaret Fuller. (2002) ISBN 9780395980750
- A Concise Companion to American Studies. Blackwell's Companions to Cultural Studies. (2010) ISBN 9781444319088
- A Historical Guide To Henry James (2012) ISBN 9780195121353
- Racial Blackness and the Discontinuity of Western Modernity (2014) ISBN 9780252079511

=== Selected articles ===
- Rowe, J. C. (1978). The Super-Historical Sense of Hart Crane's The Bridge. Genre Norman New York, 11(4), pages 597–625.
- Rowe, J. C. (1980). The Internal Conflict of Romantic Narrative: Hegel's Phenomenology and Hawthorne's The Scarlet Letter. MLN, pages 1203–1231.
- Rowe, J. C. (1983). What the Thunder Said: James's Hawthorne and the American Anxiety of Influence: A Centennial Essay. The Henry James Review, 4(2), pages 81–119.
- Rowe, J. C. (1990). Fatal Speculations: Murder, Money, and Manners in Pudd’nhead Wilson. Mark Twain’s “Pudd’nhead Wilson”: Race, Conflict, and Culture, pages 137–54.
- Rowe, J. C. (1998). Post-nationalism, globalism, and the new American studies. Cultural Critique, (40), pages 11–28.
- Rowe, J. C. (2003). Nineteenth-Century United States Literary Culture and Transnationality. PMLA, 118(1), pages 78–89.
- Rowe, J. C., Bauridl, B. M., & Wiegmink, P. (2016). Decolonial Performer: Craig Santos Perez as Poet, Activist, Scholar, Teacher, and Blogger. Approaching Transnational America in Performance, 17.
- Rowe, J. C. (2022). Sarah Winnemucca's Transnational Authority in Life among the Piutes: Their Wrongs and Claims (1883). erikastudien, 67, pages 57–79.
