= Foreign Policy and United Nations Association of Austria =

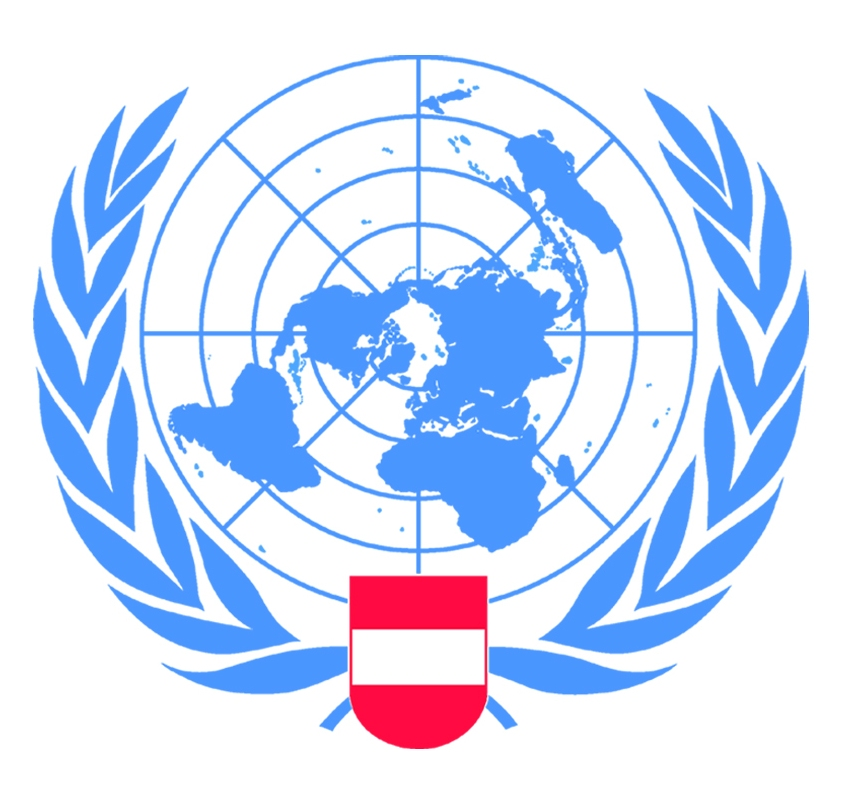
Logo
Basic Data
Founded:	2008
Founded in:	Vienna
President:	Wolfgang Schüssel
Vice-Presidents:	Peter Jankowitsch, Gregor Woschnagg, Alexander Van der Bellen, Herbert Scheibner
Secretary-General:	Michael F. Pfeifer
Website:	www.oegavn.org

The Foreign Policy and United Nations Association of Austria (UNA-Austria) was founded in 2008, when the "United Nations Association of Austria" and the "Austrian Association for Foreign Policy and International Relations" were merged. UNA-Austria is a founding member of the World Federation of United Nations Associations (WFUNA) and has as well an independent youth organization, the United Nations Youth and Students Association of Austria (UNYSA-Austria).

== Aims ==
The main aim of UNA-Austria is informing the Austrian civil society about Austrian foreign policy, international relations and the European Union. With that, UNA-Austria wants to strengthen the interest for actual international relevant topics in politics, economy and society. Another focus lies on information about the United Nations and its specialized organizations.

== Activities ==
UNA-Austria organizes weekly lectures at the "UNA-Austria Wednesday Club", where diplomats, politicians and scientists are invited from all over the world to the premises of UNA-Austria at the Spanish Riding School in Vienna. Other lectures are being organized very often at the Austrian Parliament such as the lecture of United Nations Secretary-General Ban Ki-moon. The biggest annual event are the "Foreign Policy Talks" which are being held since 1967 at Hernstein Castle in lower Austria.
