= Roland Hagenbüchle =

Scholar for American Studies and philosopher (1932–2008)

Roland Hagenbüchle (13 October 1932 in Frauenfeld, Switzerland – 14 January 2008) was a scholar for American Studies and cultural philosopher.

== Life, teaching and research ==
Hagenbüchle studied first architecture at the ETH Zurich and completed a two-year internship in Basel, then linguistics, English and German at the University of Zurich. After studying in Cambridge (UK) and Nancy he finished his PH.D. in Zurich 1964. From 1970 to 1972 Hagenbüchle was doctoral fellow at Yale University. In 1974 he finished the habilitation in Zürich.

After visiting professorships in Bern, Göttingen and at the John F. Kennedy Institute for North American Studies, Free University of Berlin, he was appointed in 1975 to a professorship at the newly opened University of Wuppertal. In 1980, Hagenbüchle simultaneously got two calls to the University of Marburg and at the Catholic University of Eichstätt. Hagenbüchle was from 1980 to 1996 Chair of American Studies at the Catholic University of Eichstätt-Ingolstadt.

Roland Hagenbüchle is an internationally renowned interpreter of the works of American poet Emily Dickinson. After the retirement in 1996 Hagenbüchle moved his research interests to the broader field of cultural philosophy, especially on interculturality, the problematic relationship between the different cultures and the critique of Western thought.

== Awards ==
- Scholar in Amherst Award 2008
- The Emily Dickinson International Society Price 2004

== Publications (selection) ==
- Emily Dickinson. Wagnis der Selbstbegegnung. Stauffenburg, Tübingen 1988, ISBN 3-923721-14-5.
- "Precision and Indeterminacy in the Poetry of Emily Dickinson", Emerson Society Quarterly, 1974
- The Emily Dickinson Handbook (S Juhasz, G Grabher, R Hagenbüchle, C Miller),1998, University of Massachusetts Press
- Paul Geyer und Roland Hagenbüchel (Hrsg.): Das Paradox. Eine Herausforderung des abendländischen Denkens (= Stauffenburg-Colloquium. Band 21). Stauffenburg, Tübingen 1992, ISBN 3-923721-78-1.
- Geschichte und Vorgeschichte der modernen Subjektivität (PDF; 205 kB). In: Reto Luzius Fetz, Roland Hagenbüchle, Peter Schulz (Hrsg.): Geschichte und Vorgeschichte der modernen Subjektivität. Walter de Gruyter, Berlin [u. a.] 1998, ISBN 3-11-014938-9.
- Von der Multi-Kulturalität zur Inter-Kulturalität (PDF; 470 kB). Königshausen & Neumann, Würzburg 2002, ISBN 3-8260-2264-5.
- Kultur im Wandel oder Die Provokation des Vulgären. Königshausen & Neumann, Würzburg 2005, ISBN 3-8260-3166-0

== Literature ==
- Hans Hunfeld (Hrsg.): Wozu Wissenschaft heute? Ringvorlesung zu Ehren von Roland Hagenbüchle. Narr, Tübingen 1997, ISBN 3-8233-5181-8.
- Messmer, Marietta / Josef Raab (eds.): American Vistas and beyond: A Festschrift for Roland Hagenbüchle. Trier 2002 ISBN 3-88476-553-1
