= Soyica Colbert =

American author

- Awards: Guggenheim Fellow (2023)

Academic background
- Education: Georgetown University; Rutgers University
- Thesis: From Repetition to Reproduction: African American Drama in the African American Literary (2006)
- Doctoral advisor: Cheryl Wall

Academic work
- Discipline: Black studies
- Institutions: Dartmouth College; Georgetown University

Provost of Georgetown University
- Interim
- Assumed office December 2024
- President: Robert Groves
- Preceded by: Robert Groves

Soyica Senta Diggs Colbert is an American author and academic administrator. A 2023 Guggenheim Fellow, she is author of The African American Theatrical Body (2011), Black Movements (2017), and Radical Vision (2021). Since 2024, she has served as interim provost of Georgetown University.

== Biography ==
She studied at Georgetown University as an undergraduate and obtained her degree there in 2001, before moving to Rutgers University to get her master degree and PhD; her doctoral dissertation From Repetition to Reproduction: African American Drama in the African American Literary (2006) was supervised by Cheryl Wall. After working at Dartmouth College as an assistant professor of English, she became part of the Georgetown University faculty and was eventually appointed Idol Family Professor.

In academic administration, she has also served as vice dean of the Georgetown University College of Arts & Sciences and chair of the Georgetown University Department of Performing Arts. In December 2024, she was appointed as interim provost and executive vice president of Georgetown, following Robert Groves' decision to step down from both roles to become interim president.

She specializes in African American studies. She was author of The African American Theatrical Body (2011) and Black Movements (2017). She won the 2022 Association for Theatre in Higher Education Outstanding Book Award for her book Radical Vision, a biography of the playwright Lorraine Hansberry.

She has co-edited two volumes related to performance studies: The Psychic Hold of Slavery (2016) and Race and Performance After Repetition (2020). In 2021, she published Theory for Theatre Studies: Bodies, part of Bloomsbury's Theory for Theatre Studies textbook series. In 2022, she was editor of the Bloomsbury Student Edition of The Crucible. She has also served as a dramaturge for Arena Stage and as an associate director for the Shakespeare Theatre Company.

In 2023, she was awarded a Guggenheim Fellow in Theatre Arts and Performance Studies.

== Bibliography ==
- The African American Theatrical Body (2011)
- (ed. with Robert J. Patterson and Aida Levy-Hussen) The Psychic Hold of Slavery (2016)
- Black Movements (2017)
- (ed. with Douglas A. Jones and Shane Vogel) Race and Performance After Repetition (2020)
- Radical Vision (2021)
- Theory for Theatre Studies: Bodies (2021)
- (ed.) The Crucible (2022; original by Arthur Miller)
