= Donald E. Pease =

American cultural critic and educator

- Occupations: Cultural critic, educator
- Known for: Theory of American Exceptionalism; New Americanist scholarship
- Awards: Bode Prize (2002)

Academic background
- Education: University of Missouri; University of Chicago
- Doctoral advisor: James E. Miller, Jr.

Academic work
- Discipline: American studies, American literary studies
- Website: https://english.dartmouth.edu/people/donald-e-pease

Donald E. Pease is the Ted and Helen Geisel Third Century Professor in the Humanities, chair of the Master of Arts in Liberal Studies Program, professor of English and comparative literature at Dartmouth College. He is an Americanist, literary and cultural critic, and academic. He has been a member of the boundary 2 editorial collective since 1977 or 1978. He was the founding editor of the New Americanists series at Duke University Press and editor of the Re-Encountering Colonialism Series and Re-Mapping the Transnational Turn: A Dartmouth Series in American Studies for the University Press of New England (UPNE). Pease directed the annual Futures of American Studies Institute at Dartmouth.

== Education and academic career ==
Pease earned a B.A. (1968) and M.A. (1969) at the University of Missouri and a Ph.D. in English from the University of Chicago (1973). He has been on the faculty of Dartmouth College since 1973. He has been a visiting professor or scholar at Indiana University, Wesleyan University, University of Pittsburgh, Oxford University, Freie Universitaet, University at Buffalo, and the University of Rome Tor Vergata.

== New Americanists ==
Pease was among the scholars identified by Frederick C. Crews as "The New Americanists" in his 1988 critique of "the now dominant faction" in American Studies published in The New York Review of Books under the title "Whose American Renaissance?" Pease appropriated this name from Crews to push forward new methods of interpretation and critique within American literary studies and within American Studies. The work of the New Americanists, and Pease in particular, challenged existing paradigms of reading, in particular the liberal consensus that depended upon a separation between culture and the public sphere. Pease's response to Crews appeared in an essay published in 1990 in boundary 2 as "New Americanists: Revisionist Interventions into the Canon". In an interview with Racheal Fest appearing in boundary 2, Pease says of the legacy of the New Americanists: "I see the chief legacy of the New Americanists as the ongoing transformation of knowledge production in literature departments across the United States". The Duke University Press described Pease's the Americanist Series as dedicated to "the return of socio-political questions, counternational discourses, and minority perspectives to American studies"

== Dr. Seuss ==
Pease is a noted scholar of Theodor Geisel or "Dr. Seuss". Pease authored an interpretive biography for Oxford University Press's "Lives and Legacies" series titled Theodor SEUSS Geisel: A Portrait of the Man Who Became Dr. Seuss in 2010. This book places Dr. Seuss in a pantheon of great writers including Mark Twain, Walt Whitman, Benjamin Franklin, T.S. Eliot and William Faulkner. Pease provides what he terms a "psychobiography" of Dr. Seuss by interpreting the transformation of Theodor Geisel from "an artist tycoon of Madison Avenue into a world-renowned author of children’s books". Jenny Williams, writing for WIRED, calls Pease's book “an academic study of the content, meaning and motivations of Geisel's work".

== Fellowships and honors ==
Pease has held fellowships from the Guggenheim, Mellon, Ford, and Hewlett foundations. He has received two National Endowment for the Humanities grants to direct programs for college teachers on the subject of nineteenth-century American Literature. Professor Pease serves on the board of governors of the Clinton Institute in American Studies and received the Dartmouth College Faculty Award for Service to Alumni Continuing Education in 1999, awarded by Dartmouth's Alumni Council. In 2000 he was a guest lecturer for the Drue Heinz Visiting Professor at Oxford University. Pease has been distinguished visiting professor at the JFK Institute in American Studies at the Freie Universität Berlin; the State University of New York at Buffalo, and the University of Rome Tor Vergata. The Faculty of Languages at Uppsala University (Sweden) awarded Pease a doctorate honoris causa in 2011. In 2012 the American Studies Association (ASA) awarded Pease the Carl Bode-Norman Holmes Pearson Prize for Outstanding Contributions to American Studies. Robyn Wiegman, professor of literature and of women's studies at Duke University, writes of Pease's contribution to the field of American studies: “As one of the most important scholars in American Studies today and a major architect of its extra institutional pedagogies, his contributions to the field are unsurpassed.”.

== Bibliography ==
=== Teacher ===
- With his Dartmouth colleague James E. "Jed" Dobson, Pease teaches a Massive Open Online Course (MOOC) via the edX platform on American literature and culture called "The American Renaissance."

=== Writer ===
- Visionary Compacts: American Renaissance Writings in Cultural Context (University of Wisconsin Press, 1987).
- The New American Exceptionalism (University of Minnesota Press, 2009).
- Theodor Seuss Geisel (Oxford University Press, 2010).

=== Editor ===
- The American Renaissance Reconsidered: Selected Papers of the English Institute, 1982–1983 (Johns Hopkins University Press, 1985) with Walter Benn Michaels.
- New Essays on the Rise of Silas Lapham (Cambridge University Press, 1991).
- Cultures of U.S. Imperialism (Duke University Press, 1992) with Amy Kaplan.
- National Identities and Postnational Narratives (Duke University Press, 1994).
- New Americanists: Revisionist Interventions into the Canon (Duke University Press, 1994).
- Futures of American Studies (Duke University Press, 2002).
- Re-framing the Transnational Turn in American Studies (Dartmouth College Press, 2011).
- A William V. Spanos Reader: Humanist Criticism and the Secular Imperative (Northwestern, 2015).

=== Selected chapters/sections of books ===
- "J. Hillis Miller: The Other Victorian at Yale", in The Yale Critics: Deconstruction in America, ed. Arac et al. (University of Minnesota Press, 1983).
- "Author", in Critical Terms for Literary Study, 2nd edition, eds. Lentricchia and McLaughlin (University of Chicago Press, 1995).

=== Selected articles ===
- "Regulating Multi-Adhoccerists, Fish('s) Rules", Critical Inquiry 23.2 (1997):396–418.
- "C. L. R. James, Moby Dick, and the Emergence of Transnational American Studies", Arizona Quarterly 56.3 (2000).
- "Doing Justice to C. L. R. James's Mariners, Renegades, and Castaways", boundary 2 27.2 (2000):1–19.
- "Hawthorne in the Custom-House: The Metapolitics, Postpolitics, and Politics of The Scarlet Letter". boundary 2 32.1 (2005).
- "Dr. Seuss in Ted Geisel's Never-Never Land", PMLA 126.1 (2011):197–202.
