= Nathan Huggins =

American historian (1927–1989)

- Born: January 14, 1927; Chicago, Illinois, US
- Died: December 5, 1989 (aged 62); Cambridge, Massachusetts, US
- Education: University of California at Berkeley; Harvard University
- Occupations: Historian, author and educator

Nathan Irvin Huggins (January 14, 1927 – December 5, 1989) was a distinguished American historian, author and educator. As a leading scholar in the field of African American studies, he was W. E. B. Du Bois Professor of History and of Afro-American Studies at Harvard University as well as director of the W. E. B. Du Bois Institute for Afro-American Research. He died of cancer in Cambridge, Massachusetts, aged 62.

== Early life ==
Huggins was born in Chicago, Illinois, on January 14, 1927. His father was Winston J. Huggins, an African-American waiter and railroad worker, and his mother was Marie Warsaw, a Jewish woman. When Huggins was 12 years old, his father left the family and his mother moved them to San Francisco, California. Marie Warsaw died two years later, leaving 14-year-old Nathan and his sister on their own. Huggins attended high school and worked as a warehouseman, longshoreman, and porter. Near the end of World War II, he was drafted and completed high school in the army. Huggins later used the GI Bill of Rights to enter the University of California, Berkeley.

== Education ==
Huggins studied at the University of California at Berkeley, receiving his A.B. degree in 1954 and M.A. in 1955. He studied at Harvard University, where he received his A.M. in 1957 and Ph.D. in history in 1962.

== Academic life ==
Huggins held assistant professorships at California State University, Long Beach, Lake Forest College (Illinois), and the University of Massachusetts Boston. He served as visiting associate professor at the University of California at Berkeley before joining the faculty at Columbia University as a professor of history in 1970. Ten years later, Huggins accepted positions as the first W. E. B. Du Bois Professor of History and Afro-American Studies and Director of the Du Bois Institute for Afro-American Research at Harvard University. He also taught outside the U.S. at the University of Heidelberg, the John F. Kennedy Institute for North American Studies of the Free University of Berlin, the University of Grenoble and the Sorbonne.

Huggins studied the history of African Americans as an integral part of the history of the United States. His research interests included the history of slavery, the experience of slavery and its impact on American society and culture. The center of his argument was that without a knowledge of the African-American experience one could not understand what is usually called American history, but rather what colleagues said could be a code for "white American history". With careful scholarship and empathy, his 1977 book Black Odyssey tells the story of the self-creation of the African-American people. It traces the full impact of the Middle Passage and of North American slavery, both on the enslaved and on those who enslaved them. Likewise, his study of the Harlem Renaissance is a lens to examine American society in the Jazz Age.

Huggins wrote an important biography of Frederick Douglass and edited the biographical series Black Americans of Achievement. He was working on a major biography of the late Nobel Prize-winning diplomat Ralph Bunche and on a shorter book about the Civil Rights Movement in the United States when he died.

In 1981, Huggins established the W. E. B. Du Bois Lectureship in Afro-American Life, History and Culture. Harvard students praised Huggins for "exceptional clarity and entertaining lectures" in a course he and a colleague taught on changing concepts of race in the United States.

== Works ==
- Protestants Against Poverty: Boston's Charities, 1870–1900 (Foreword by Oscar Handlin). Westport, CT: Greenwood (1971). ISBN 0-8371-3307-6
- Harlem Renaissance. New York: Oxford University Press, 1971. ISBN 0-19-501665-3
- Key issues in the Afro-American experience. Edited by Nathan I. Huggins, Martin Kilson [and] Daniel M. Fox. New York, Harcourt Brace Jovanovich [1971]. 2 vols. ISBN 0-15-548371-4 (vol. 1). ISBN 0-15-548372-2 (vol. 2)
- Voices From the Harlem Renaissance. New York: Oxford University Press (1976). ISBN 0-19-501955-5
- Black Odyssey: The African-American Ordeal in Slavery. New York: Pantheon (1977; reissued with new introduction, 1990). ISBN 0-679-72814-7
- Slave and Citizen: The Life of Frederick Douglass. Boston: Little, Brown (1980). ISBN 0-316-38000-8
- Afro-American Studies: A Report to the Ford Foundation. New York: Ford Foundation (1985). ISBN 0-916584-25-9
- W. E. B. Du Bois, Writings: The Suppression of the African Slave-Trade, The Souls of Black Folk, Dusk of Dawn, essays, articles from The Crisis, ed. Nathan I. Huggins. Penguin USA (1986). ISBN 1-883011-31-0
- Revelations: American History, American Myths, ed. Brenda Smith Huggins. New York: Oxford University Press (1995). ISBN 0-19-508236-2
