= Wilson Jeremiah Moses =

African-American historian (born 1942)

Wilson Jeremiah Moses (1942-2024) was an African-American historian. He was Professor of American History at Pennsylvania State University.

== Career ==
Wilson J. Moses earned his A.B. and M.A. in British Literature at Wayne State University, and his Ph.D. in American Civilization at Brown University. He held the Walter L. Ferree professorship in the middle period of American History at Pennsylvania State University before that, and he currently is Professor Emeritus at Penn State. He has in the past held a series of posts at other American Universities:

- Assistant Professor of History at the University of Iowa;
- Associate Professor of History at Southern Methodist University;
- Professor of Afro-American Studies and American Civilization at Brown University and
- Professor of English and History and Director of African American Studies at Boston University.

He also has been a visiting professor at Harvard University, and given lectures at several European and African universities.

== Works ==
- The Golden Age of Black Nationalism, 1850–1925, 1978; repr., Oxford University Press, 1988, ISBN 978-0-19-520639-5
- Black Messiahs and Uncle Toms: Social and Literary Manipulations of a Religious Myth, 1982; Revised edition: Pennsylvania State Univ. Press, 1993, ISBN 978-0-271-00933-9
- Alexander Crummell: A Study of Civilization and Discontent, Oxford University Press, 1989, ISBN 978-0-19-505096-7
- The Wings of Ethiopia, Iowa State Univ. Press, 1990, ISBN 978-0-8138-0019-6
- Afrotopia: Roots of African-American Popular History, Cambridge University Press, 1998, ISBN 978-0-521-47941-7 (or hardback: ISBN 978-0-521-47408-5)
- Creative Conflict in African American Thought, Cambridge University Press, 2004, ISBN 978-0-521-53537-3 (or hardback: ISBN 978-0-521-82826-0)
- Thomas Jefferson: A Modern Prometheus, Cambridge University Press, 2019

== Sources ==
- Contemporary Authors Online, Thomson Gale, 2004.
- Bernard E. Powers Jr., "Wilson Jeremiah Moses, Creative Conflict in African American Thought: Frederick Douglass, Alexander Crummell, Booker T. Washington, W.E.B. Du Bois, and Marcus Garvey". Cambridge, UK: Cambridge University Press, 2004." in History of Intellectual Culture, 2007, Vol. 7, No. 1: 1–4.
- Robert S. Levine, "Elegant Inconsistencies: Race, Nation, and Writing Wilson Jeremiah Moses's Afrotopia" in American Literary History (2008) 20 (3): 497–507.
- Tommy Lott and John P. Pittman, eds., A Companion to African-American Philosophy. Malden MA: Blackwell Publishing, 2003. pp. 89–91
