= Philological Library =

Library in Berlin

Philological Library of Freie Universität Berlin
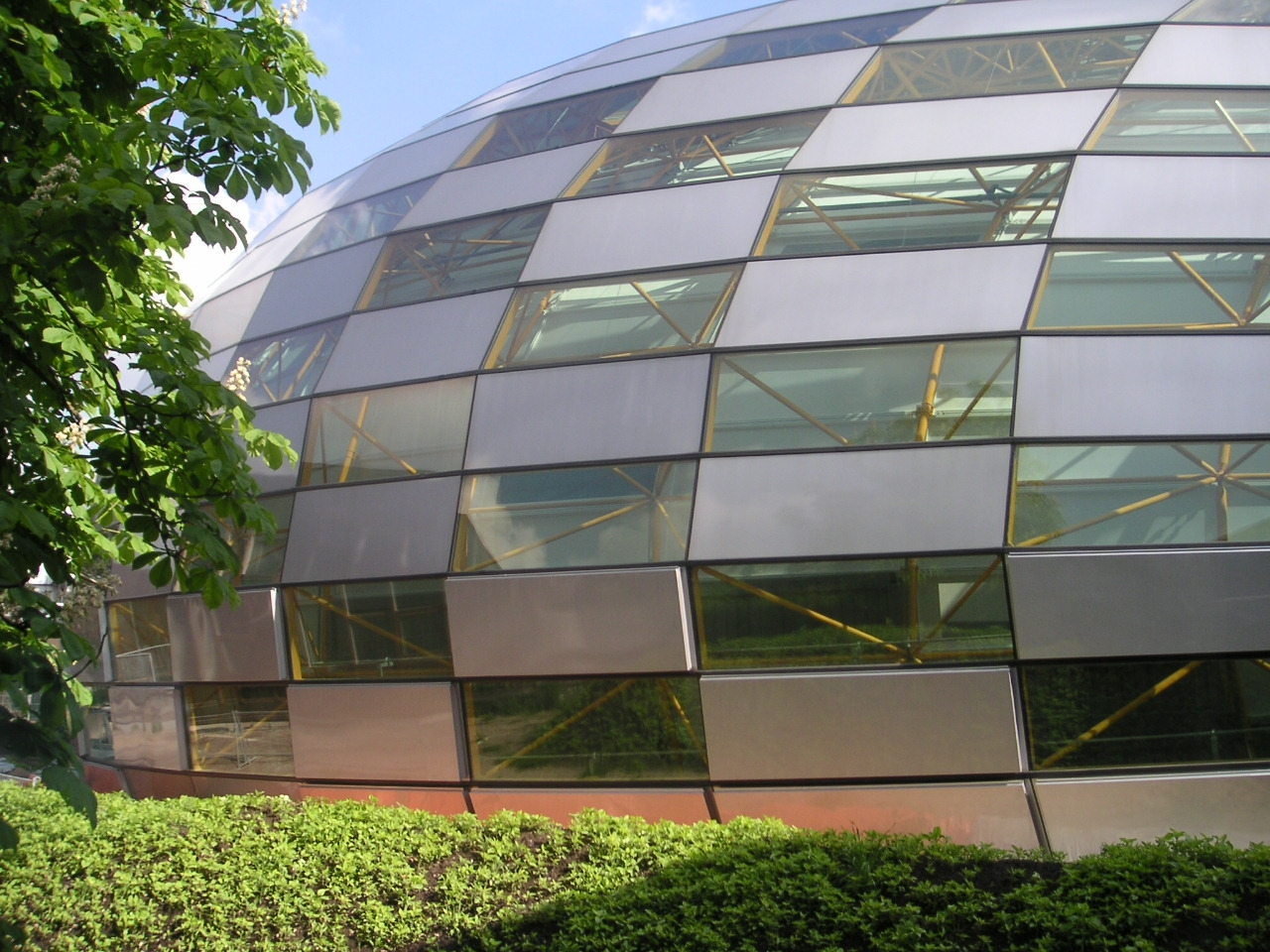
- 52°27′07″N 13°17′18″E
- Location: Dahlem, Berlin
- Type: Academic library
- Established: 2005
- Branches: 11

Collection
- Size: 800,000 volumes

Other information
- Website: www.fu-berlin.de/en/sites/philbib/index.html

The Philological Library (German: Philologische Bibliothek) is a component of the "Rust and Silver Lodges" complex in the main campus of the Freie Universität Berlin. It was designed by internationally known architect Norman Foster, Baron Foster of Thames Bank in the shape of a human brain, and opened in 2005. The library merges the separate smaller libraries of the departments and institutes of humanities and now contains:

- General and Comparative literature
- Byzantine/ Modern Greek studies
- English studies
- German studies
- Comparative and Indo-European Linguistics
- Classics
- Dutch Linguistics and Literature
- Indian Linguistics and Literature/ South Asian Studies
- Latin American Studies
- Medieval Latin Language and Literature
- Philosophy (since 2007)
- Romance studies
- Slavic studies

It has become the centerpiece of the university's Dahlem campus and a Berlin architectural landmark.
