= Free University of Berlin =

Public university in Berlin, Germany

- Freie Universität Berlin
- Seal of the Free University of Berlin
- Motto: Veritas, Iustitia, Libertas (Latin)
- Motto in English: Truth, Justice, Liberty
- Type: Public
- Established: 4 December 1948; 77 years ago
- Affiliations: Charité – Universitätsmedizin Berlin; DFG; EUA; German Excellence Universities; U15; Una Europa; UNICA
- Budget: EUR 648.8 million
- President: Günter M. Ziegler (2018–present)
- Academic staff: 2,851
- Administrative staff: 2,719
- Students: 38,539 (2022)
- Undergraduates: 22,636 (2021)
- Postgraduates: 9,938 (2021)
- Doctoral students: 3,628 (2021)
- Location: Kaiserswerther Straße 16–18, Berlin, Germany; 52°27′11″N 13°17′26″E
- Campus: Suburban and urban (180 hectares (440 acres))
- Colors: Black; Green
- Website: www.fu-berlin.de

The Free University of Berlin (Note: The university uses its German name without translation on its English-language website.) (German: Freie Universität Berlin, often abbreviated as FU Berlin or simply FU) is a public research university in Berlin, Germany. It was founded in West Berlin in 1948 during the early Cold War period. The Free University's name referred to West Berlin's status as part of the intellectual continuum of the Western "Free World" in contrast to Soviet-controlled East Berlin. Its main campus is located in Berlin-Dahlem in the Steglitz-Zehlendorf district.

The Free University is one of thirteen leading German universities currently designated a "University of Excellence" according to the German Universities Excellence Initiative (Exzellenzinitiative). It was the first Berlin university to be awarded this distinction and one of only six universities nationwide to be so recognised in all three consecutive rounds of the Excellence Initiative in 2006/2007, 2012 and 2019, most recently as a member of the Berlin University Alliance. Former and current staff include five Nobel laureates. The FU Berlin has produced a total of 18 winners of the Leibniz Prize up to the year 2020. According to the Alexander von Humboldt Foundation, the university is the most frequently preferred study location in Germany for leading international scientists and young academics.

== History ==
The Free University of Berlin was established in West Berlin by faculty members and students on 4 December 1948. With American support, it was founded as the de facto Western continuation of the University of Berlin (before 1945 named the Friedrich Wilhelm University), which had reopened in 1946 in the Soviet sector of Berlin. In 1949, the University of Berlin, on its original site in East Berlin, was renamed the Humboldt University.

=== Foundation (1948–2000) ===
In January 1946, the formerly named Friedrich Wilhelm University, located in the Soviet sector of Berlin, was granted permission by the Soviet Military Administration in Germany (SMAD) to reopen as the University of Berlin. The university came under increased communist influence and repression, as it became a battlefield for the political disputes of the postwar period. This led to protests by students critical of the prevailing system. Between 1945 and 1948, more than 18 students were brutally beaten and arrested or persecuted, and some were even executed by the Soviet secret police (NKVD).

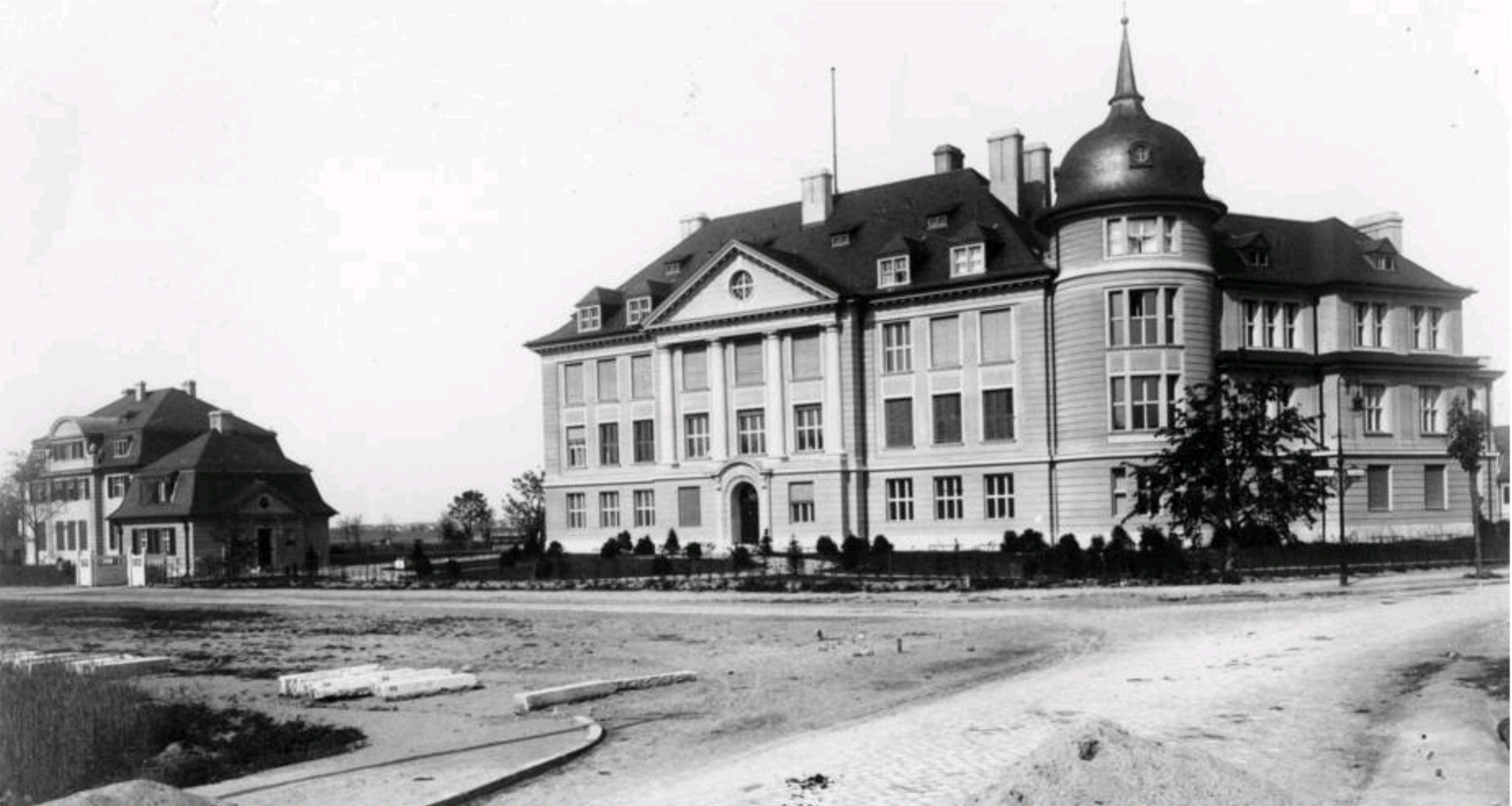
Kaiser Wilhelm Institute for Chemistry in 1911. Today, the Hahn-Meitner building houses the Institute for Biochemistry, where nuclear fission was discovered.

At the end of 1947, students demanded a university free from political influence. The climax of the protests was reached on 23 April 1948: after three students were expelled from the university without a trial, about 2,000 students protested at the Hotel Esplanade. By the end of April, the governor of the United States Army, Lucius D. Clay, issued the order to legally examine the formation of a new university in the western sectors of Berlin. On 19 June 1948, the "preparatory committee for establishing a free university" consisting of politicians, professors, administrative staff members, and students, met. With a manifesto titled "Request for establishing a free university in Berlin", the committee appealed to the public for support.

The municipal authorities of Berlin granted the foundation of a free university and requested the opening for the coming 1948/49 winter semester. Meanwhile, the students' committee in the German Democratic Republic protested against the formation; the GDR described the new university as the "so-called free university" in official documents until the fall of the Berlin Wall.

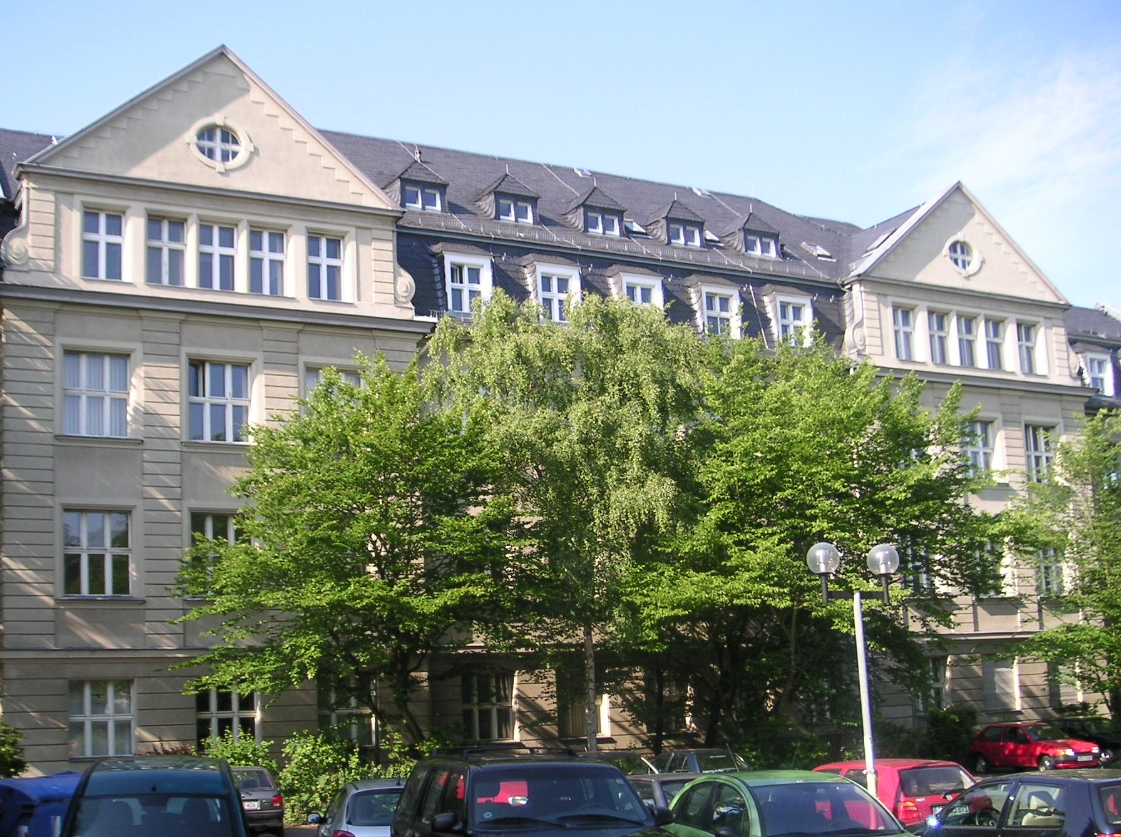
The former Kaiser Wilhelm Institute for Biology. Today, it houses the Department of Law.

The Berlin City Deputies Assembly (Stadtverordnetenversammlung) accepted the by-law on 4 November 1948. The by-law achieved prominence under its alias "the Berlin model": The university was founded as a statutory corporation (Körperschaft des öffentlichen Rechts) and was not directly subject to the state, as it was controlled by a supervisory board consisting of six representatives of the state of Berlin, three representatives of the university, and students. This form was unique in Germany at that time, as the students had much more influence on the system than before. Until the 1970s, the involvement of the students in the committees was slowly cut back while adapting to the model of the Western German universities in order to be fully recognized as an equivalent university.

On 15 November 1948, the first lectures were held in the buildings of the Kaiser Wilhelm Society for the Advancement of Science. The actual foundation ceremony took place on 4 December 1948 in the Titania Palace, a film theatre with the largest hall available in the western sectors of Berlin. Attendees at the event were not only scholars, politicians (the Governing Mayor Ernst Reuter amongst others) and students, but also representatives of American universities, including Stanford University and Yale University. The first elected president of the Free University of Berlin was the historian Friedrich Meinecke.

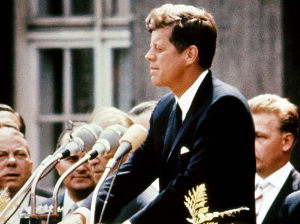
John F. Kennedy, 1963: This school [...] must be interested in turning out citizens of the world, men who comprehend the difficult, sensitive tasks that lie before us as free men and women, and men who are willing to commit their energies to the advancement of a free society.

By 1949, the Free University had registered 4,946 students. Until the construction of the Berlin Wall in 1961, many students came from the Soviet sector, often supported through the Währungsstipendium of the senate.

On 26 June 1963, the same day he delivered his Ich bin ein Berliner speech at Rathaus Schöneberg, John F. Kennedy was awarded honorary citizen status by the Free University and gave a ceremonial speech in front of the Henry Ford building, in which he addressed the future of Berlin and Germany under the consideration of the motto of the FU. Amongst the attendant crowd are also the Governing Mayor of West Berlin, Willy Brandt, and the Chancellor of West Germany, Konrad Adenauer. His brother, Robert F. Kennedy, visited the university in 1962 for the first time and in June 1964 to receive his honorary degree from the Department of Philosophy. The speech he held at the event was dedicated to John F. Kennedy, who was assassinated the year before.

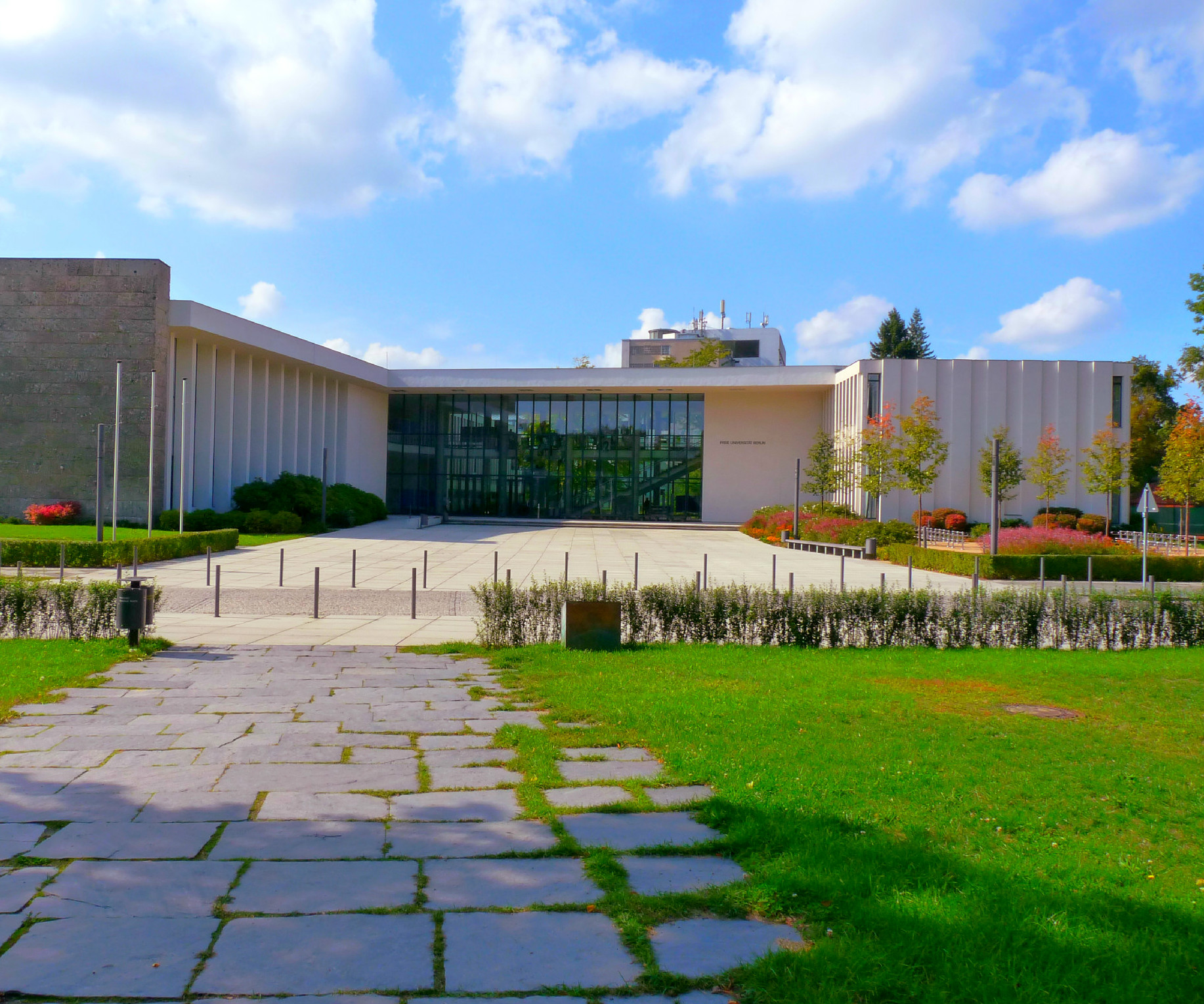
The "Henry Ford" building

In the late 1960s, the Free University of Berlin was one of the main scenes of the West German student movement of '68, as a reaction to the global student protests during that time. Significant issues included better living standards and education at the university, the Vietnam War, the presence of former Nazi Party members in the government as epitomized by the Globke affair, and continuing institutional authoritarianism. After the assassination of student Benno Ohnesorg and the attempt on the life of Rudi Dutschke, protests quickly escalated to violence throughout West Germany. The events of the 68-movement provided the impulse for more openness, equality, and democracy in West German society.

During the 1970s and 1980s, the university became a "Massenuniversität" ("mass/mega university"), first exceeding 50,000 registered students in 1983. After Reunification, the Free University of Berlin was the second-largest university in Germany (after LMU Munich), with over 62,000 students registered in the academic year 1991/92. Shortly thereafter, as the Senate of Berlin decided to drastically reduce enrollment until 2003, the number of annually registered students was 10,000 less for the next ten years

Since 2000, the Free University of Berlin has revamped itself. The university's research performance increased markedly with regard to the number of graduates, PhDs granted, and publications.

=== Since 2000 ===
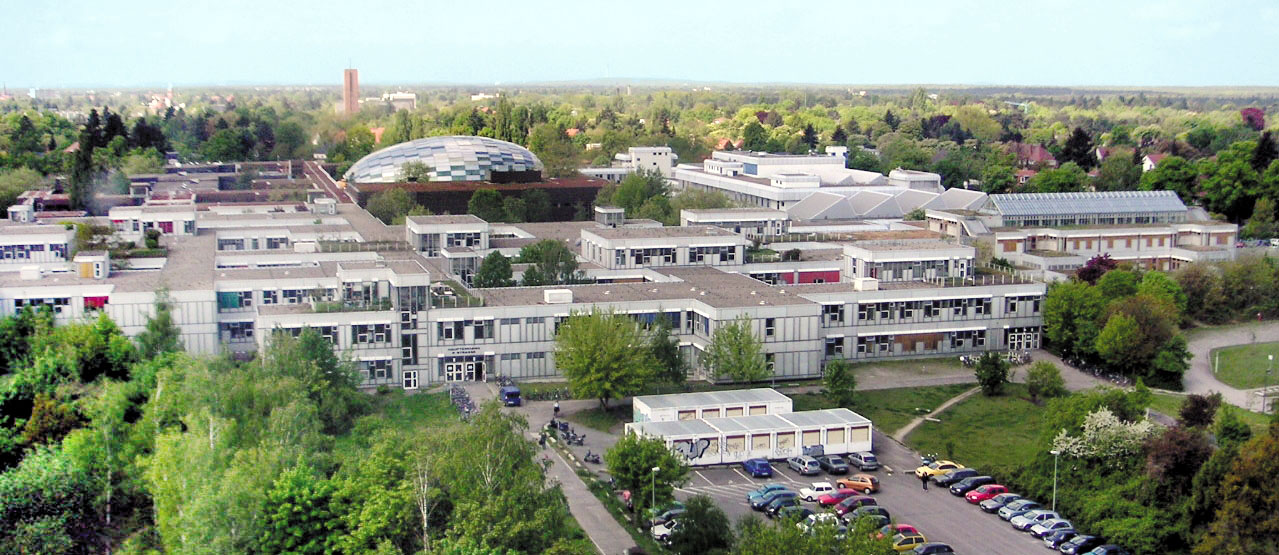
Main campus in Dahlem

Since 2003, the FU Berlin has been regrouping its research capacities into interdisciplinary research focus areas called clusters. Due to financial cutbacks and restructuring of medical schools in the same year, the medical institutions of the Free and Humboldt Universities of Berlin merged to create a joint department, the Charité – Universitätsmedizin Berlin.

The year 2007 was another crucial year for the Free University of Berlin as it was the university with the most approved funding applications in the German Universities Excellence Initiative, and it is now one of nine elite German universities to receive funding for its future development strategy. In the same year, the Free University of Berlin dedicated a monument to the founding students who were murdered during the protests. The university presents its Freedom Award to personalities who have made a special contribution toward the cause of freedom. The university received a total of 108 million euros from the Excellence Initiative for its approved projects between 2007 and 2012.

Based on its founding tradition, the Free University of Berlin seal to this day bears the Latin terms for Truth, Justice, and Liberty. The designer of the seal was art historian and former president of the Free University of Berlin, Edwin Redslob.

== Campuses ==
The main campus of the Free University is located in Dahlem, a neighbourhood in the district of Steglitz-Zehlendorf, in southwest Berlin. Additional institutes and subsidiary sites are situated in the Lichterfelde West and Düppel areas, as well as in the neighbourhoods of Steglitz and Lankwitz. Since its foundation, the main campus has been distinguished for modernist buildings designed by internationally renowned architects.

=== Campus Dahlem ===
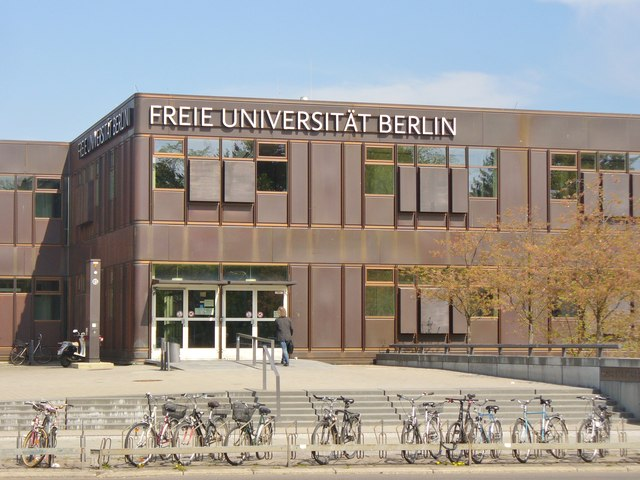
Main entry of the Campus Dahlem

Most of the facilities of the Free University are located in the residential garden district of Dahlem in southwestern Berlin. Around the beginning of the 20th century, Dahlem was established as a center for research of the highest caliber. Academic activity in Dahlem was supported by Friedrich Althoff, Ministerial Director in the Prussian Ministry of Culture, who initially proposed the foundation of a "German Oxford."

The first new buildings housed government science agencies and new research institutes of the University of Berlin. The Kaiser Wilhelm Society – forerunner of the present-day Max Planck Society – was founded in 1911 and established several institutes in Dahlem.

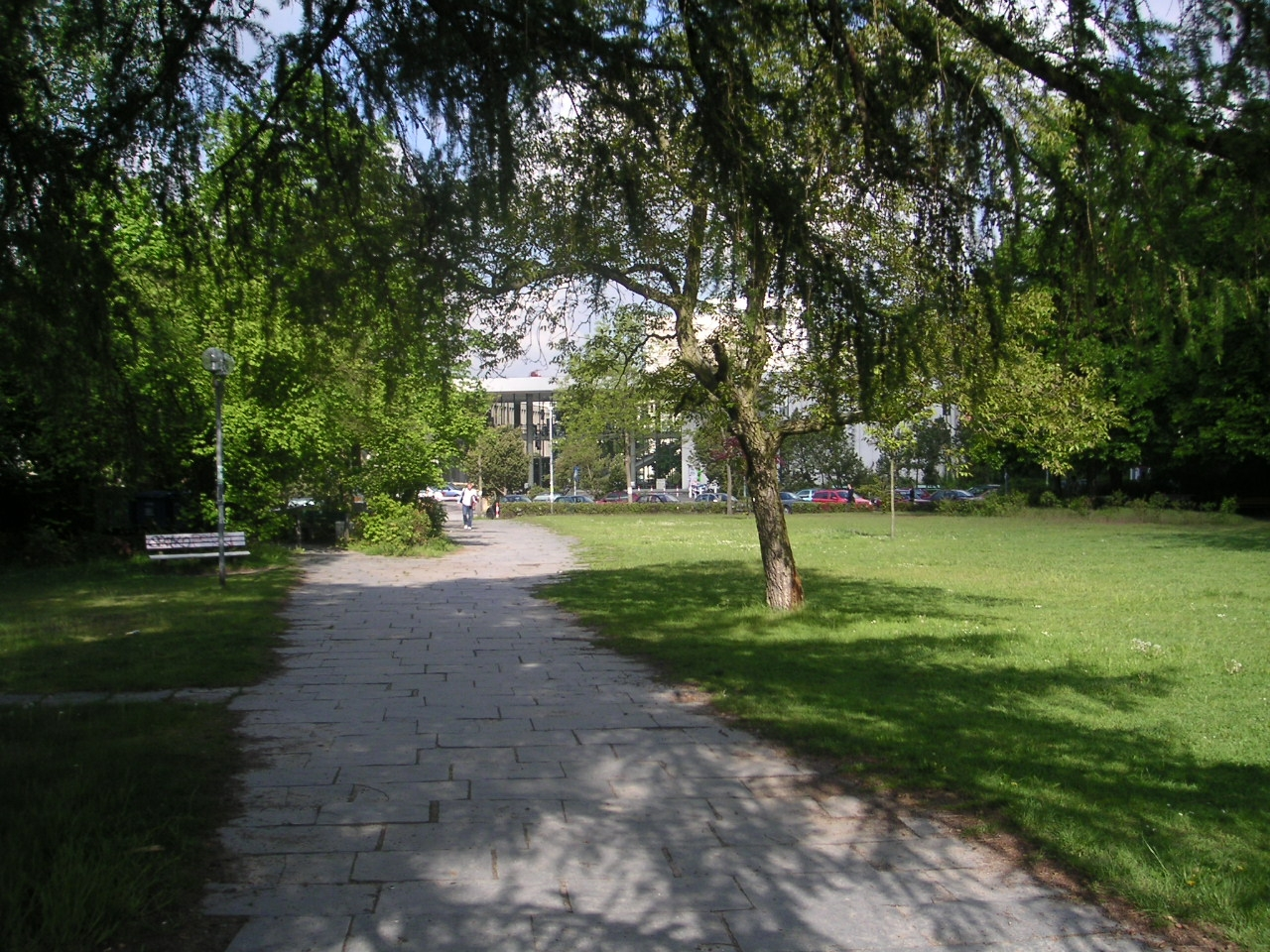
View of the southern Campus Dahlem from the canteen "Mensa I"

A dynamic group of researchers carried out pioneering research resulting in numerous Nobel Prizes. Since its foundation, the Free University of Berlin has been using buildings formerly belonging to the Kaiser Wilhelm Society and, in addition, has added numerous architecturally innovative buildings.

The Free University of Berlin's central campus at Dahlem consists of various building ensembles within a radius of about a 1.5 km. Previously, the university's facilities were located in several older institutional buildings and former private residences around the neighborhood, including the Otto Hahn Building, which still houses the Department of Biochemistry. The new plan was originally modelled on the Anglo-American university campus, a novelty in post-war Germany, where the prevailing tradition had been a focus on monumental buildings in a city centre. The main campus acquired its spatial focal point during the 1950s with the construction of new building complexes set amidst several green spaces. The first independent structure to be completed on campus (1954) was the Henry Ford building (Henry-Ford-Bau), funded by the Ford Foundation and based on designs by Gustav Müller and Franz-Heinrich Sobotka. The Henry Ford Building houses the Auditorium Maximum, additional large lecture halls, seminar rooms, and the meeting hall of the Academic Senate. Neighboring "Gründerzeit"-era villas, research buildings, and institutes belonging to the former Kaiser Wilhelm Society were also incorporated into the complex. Today, numerous departments and offices are located in southern Dahlem, including economics, social sciences and law, as well as the Otto Suhr Institute of Political Science, the Institute for East European Studies, pharmacology, biochemistry, the central university administration, and the Office of the President. The latter two occupy the building that formerly served as the Allied Kommandatura. Further donations from the United States enabled the Free University to construct several new central building complexes, including the Benjamin Franklin university clinic complex (see below).

The largest single complex of university buildings is the Rost- und Silberlaube, which can be broadly translated as the "Rust Arbor" and "Silver Arbor". This complex consists of a series of interlinked structures corresponding to either a deep bronze ("rust") or shiny white ("silver") hue, surrounding various leafy courtyards. The Rost- und Silberlaube houses numerous humanities and social sciences institutes, major lecture halls, libraries, and student support facilities. These strcuctures were complemented in 2005 by a new centerpiece, the brain-shaped Philological Library (Philologische Bibliothek), designed by British architect Lord Norman Foster. The complex was expanded in 2015 with the opening of the Holzlaube, or "Wooden Arbor", adjoining the Silberlaube. Named after its cedarwood cladding and in reference to the existing Rostlaube and Silberlaube, the new building houses 14 smaller disciplines of the Department of History and Cultural Studies, together the campus library for 24 institutes and departments, including the mathematics and natural sciences.

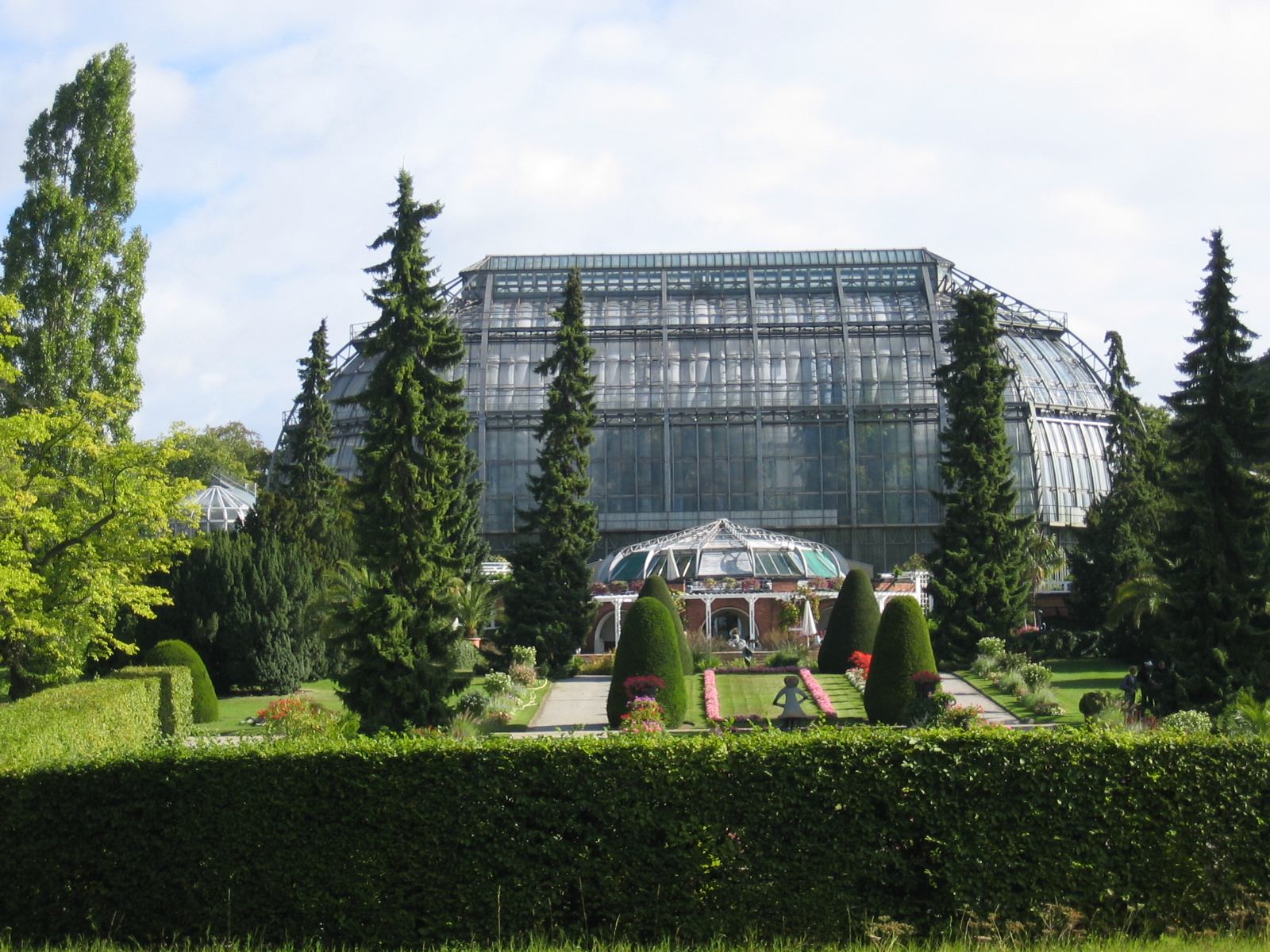
Botanical Garden: Tropical Greenhouse

The Berlin Botanical Garden and Botanical Museum, in nearby Lichterfelde West, became part of Free University in 1996. Covering 43 ha and comprising around 22,000 species of plants, it is one of the largest botanical gardens in the world.

==== Transportation ====
The main campus in Dahlem is well connected to central Berlin by public transportation. The stations Dahlem Dorf and Freie Universität (Thielplatz) connect the university to the Berlin U-Bahn system's U3 line. The Lichterfelde West station of the S1 line of the Berlin S-Bahn connects the university to Berlin Mitte.

=== Geocampus Lankwitz ===
An auxiliary site known as the "Geocampus" is situated in Lankwitz. Formerly the site of a teacher training college, it has been part of the Free University since 1980. It houses the Institute of Geographical Sciences, the Institute of Geological Sciences, and the administrative buildings of the Department of Earth Sciences. Also located in Lankwitz is the University Archives, which, among its other functions, manages the FU-Lexikon.

=== Campus Düppel ===
The campus at Düppel is on the site of the former Düppel manor estate. About 2km southwest of the main Dahlem Campus, it houses the facilities of the Department of Veterinary Medicine, including a veterinary clinic, a separate equine clinic, and an institute of poultry diseases.

=== Campus Benjamin Franklin ===
Since the formation of the FU in 1948, it has used public hospitals as part of the medical faculty. Between 1959 and 1969, the "Steglitz Clinic", located in Lichterfelde West, about 3 km southeast of Dahlem, was built with financial support from the United States. The medical centre became one of the largest European medical establishments, unifying all institutes, clinics and lecture halls. In recognition of the support by the United States, the clinic was renamed the Charité Campus Benjamin Franklin. By 1994, it consisted of 36 scientific institutes and 1,200 hospital beds. As a result of a merger in 2003, it became part of the Charité medical school.

=== Academic environment ===
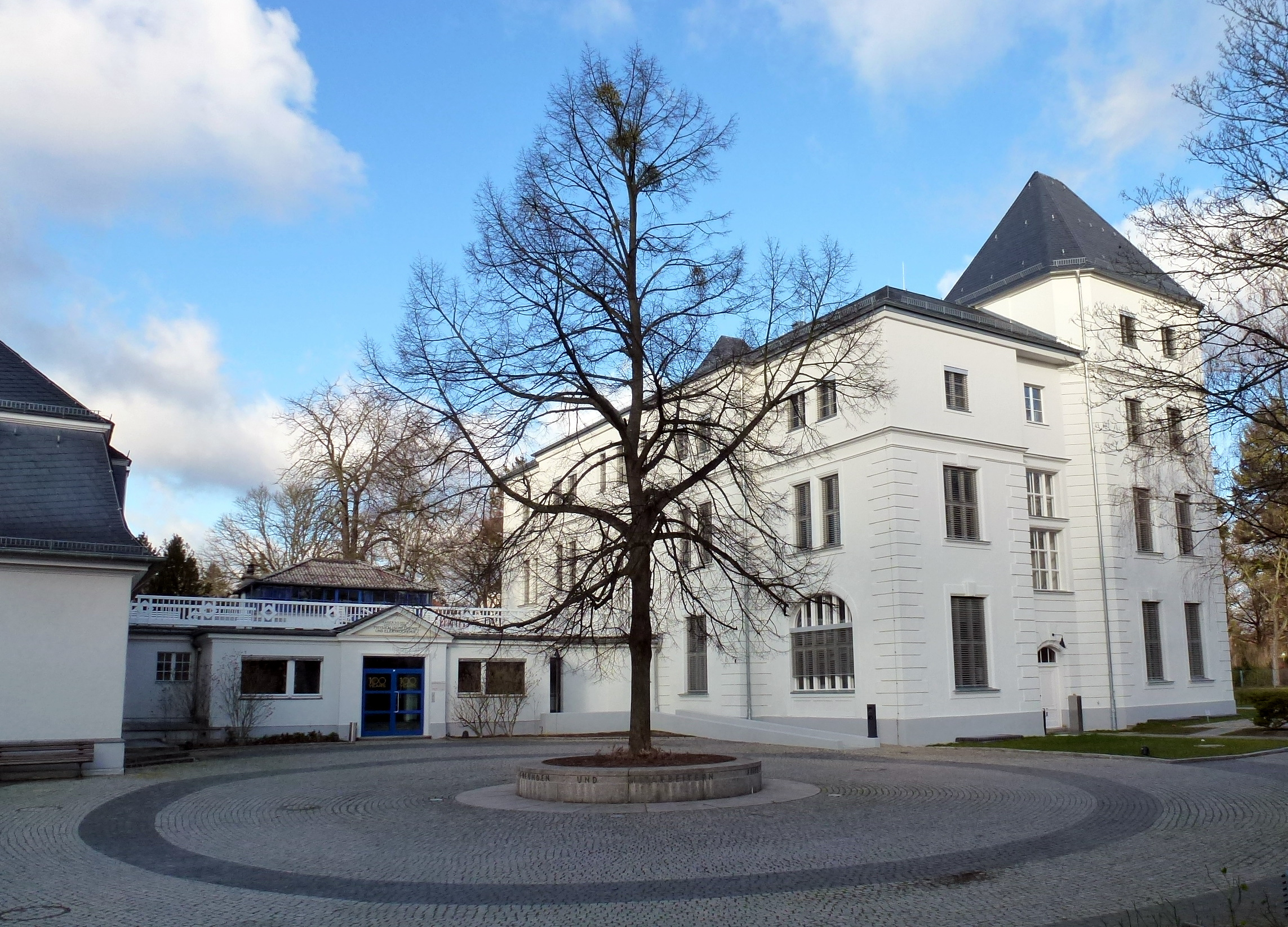
Fritz Haber Institute

Today, the district of Dahlem is a hotspot for research and culture: Beside several institutes of the Max Planck Society (amongst others: The Max Planck Institute for Human Development (MPIB), the MPI for the History of Science, the MPI for Molecular Genetics, the Fritz Haber Institute (FHI) working in the fields of molecular physics and physical chemistry and the archive of the MPG), the campus is home to the Zuse Institute Berlin as well as some federal institutions like the Federal Institute for Materials Research (BAM) and the Federal Institute for Risk Assessment (BfR).

The Berlin Geography Society, founded in 1828, the Berlin University for Professional Studies, and the German Archeological Institute (DAI) are also located on the campus. In addition, Dahlem is an important location for the Berlin State Museums group, housing the Ethnological Museum of Berlin and the Museum of Asian Art.

=== Student Village ===
During the 1960s, a student village with 27 buildings was constructed near Schlachtensee (lake), serving as housing opportunities for students.

=== Libraries ===
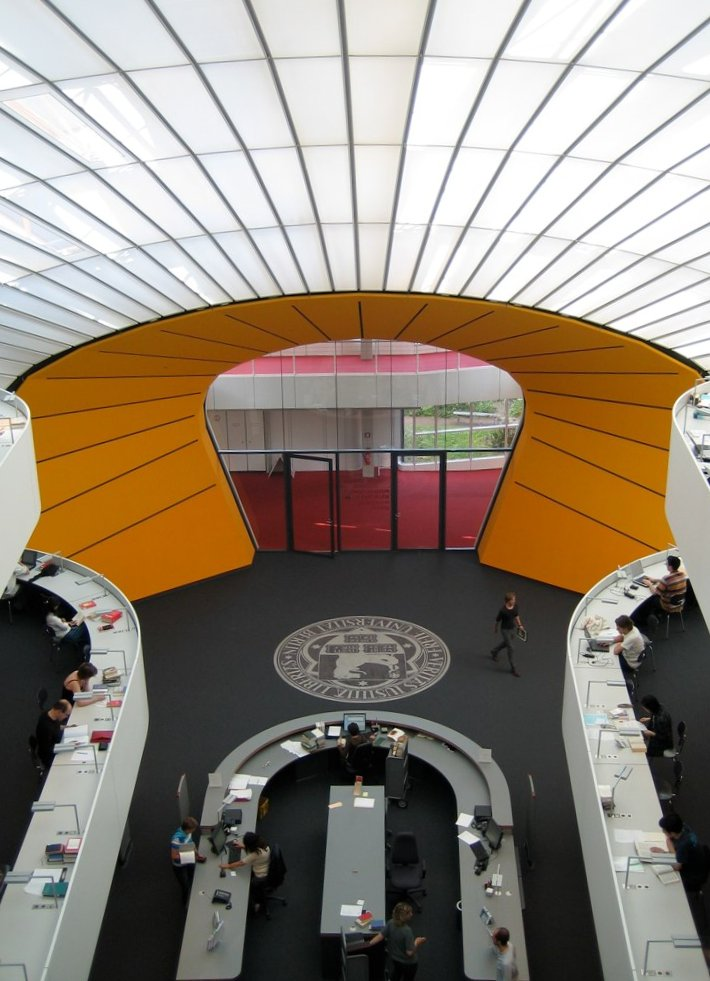
Interior of the Philological Library designed by Sir Norman Foster

The Freie Universität Berlin University Library is one of the major academic libraries in Germany. It comprises the central library, several subject libraries, and the university archive. Its holdings cover all academic disciplines represented at the university and include print and electronic resources, databases, journals, and digital research services.

The term "University Library" refers to all libraries of Freie Universität Berlin. The building at Garystr. 39 is the central library, it was formerly known as the University Library.

Library holdings in many subject areas have been consolidated into larger subject libraries, reducing the total number of locations. Notable library buildings include the Philological Library designed by Lord Norman Foster (opened 2005), and the Campus Library (opened 2015).

Holdings are researchable via the Primo Discovery System , which provides access to digital and print materials and external scholarly resources. Digitisation projects continue to integrate additional collections.

The library operates digital research infrastructures, including the institutional repository Refubium for scholarly publications and research data, as well as services for open access, research data management, and digital publishing. It also maintains digital oral history collections and participates in the development of the cross-institutional portal Oral-History.Digital for integrated access to recorded interviews.

== Organisation and governance ==
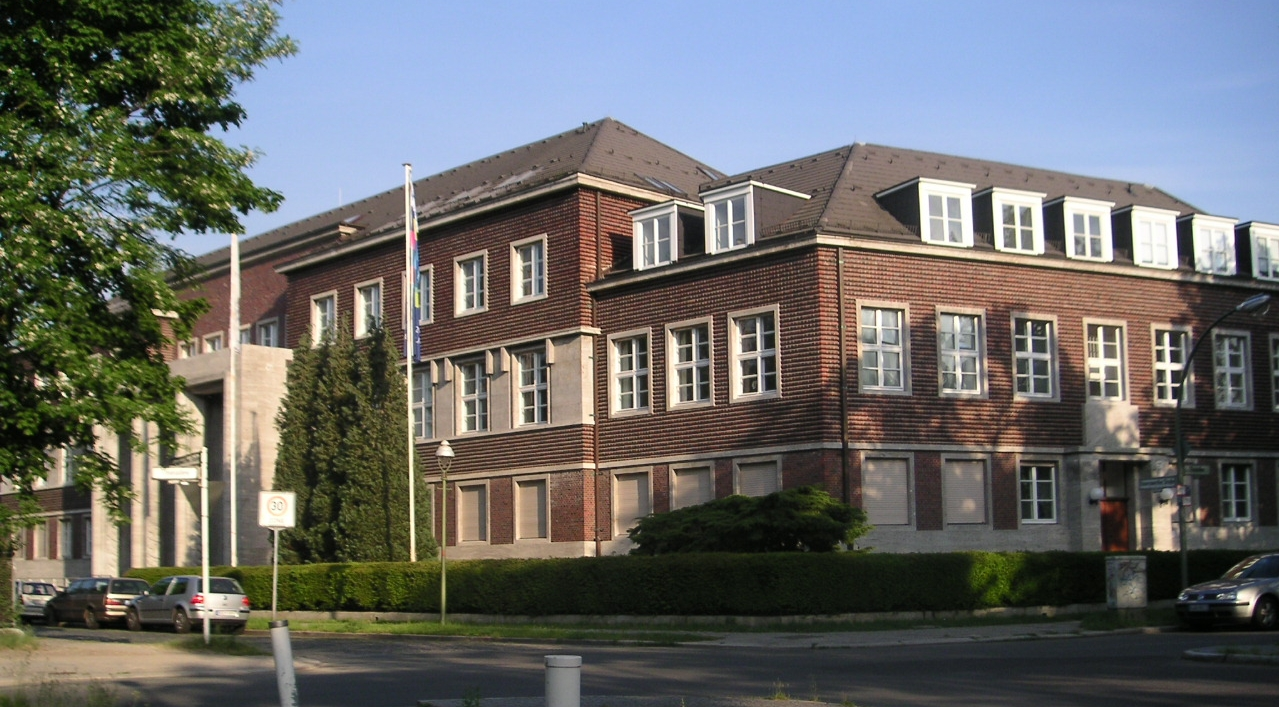
University president's office

=== Administration ===
The executive board consists of the president (Prof. Dr. Günter M. Ziegler), an executive vice president (Prof. Dr. Klaus Hoffmann-Holland), and three other vice presidents, as well as the Director of Administration and Finance (Dr.-Ing. Andrea Bör). There are also supporting offices for Public Affairs and the General Counsel for legal affairs.

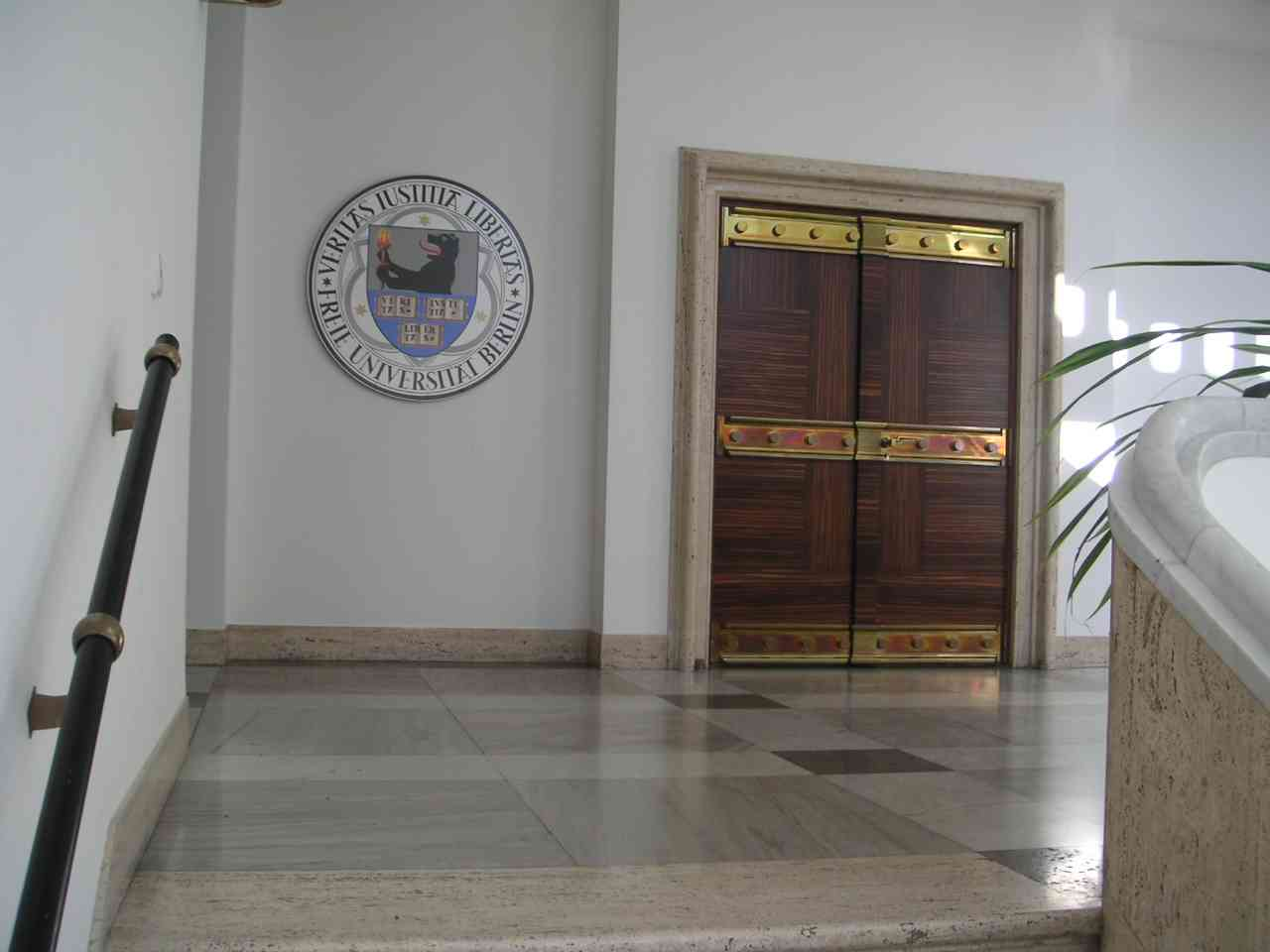
Stairway to the president's office

There are currently eight central service institutions (ZE) of the FU:

- Botanical Garden Berlin and Botanical Museum Berlin
- Center for Academic Advising, Career and Counselling Services
- Center for Continuing Studies
- Center for Recreational Sports
- Center for the Promotion of Woman's and Gender Studies
- Computing Services (ZEDAT)
- Language Center
- Academic library

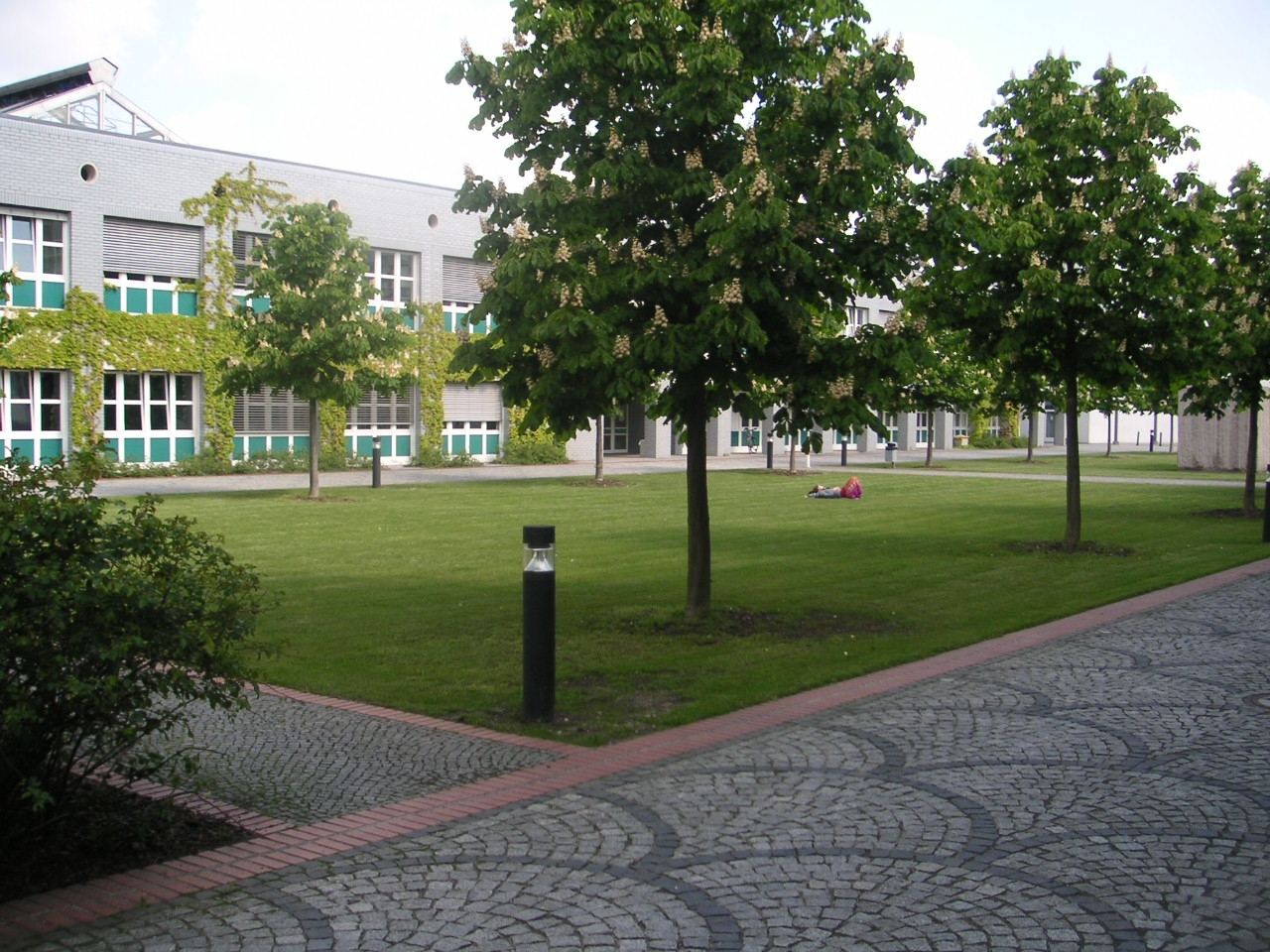
Institute of Computer Science, Dept. of Mathematics and Computer Science

The ISQ ("Institut für Schulqualität der Länder Berlin und Brandenburg", Institute for Quality of Schools in Berlin and Brandenburg) is an independent facility on the campus. It consults local schools and the senate to achieve and develop a high standard of school quality in Berlin and Brandenburg and closely cooperates with the Department of Education and Psychology of the FU.

The Collegium Musicum of Free University of Berlin was founded during the first semester in 1948/49. Under conductor Karl Forster, it merged with the ensemble of Technische Universität Berlin in 1954. Today, the Collegium Musicum has around 500 members from all fields of studies who spend their leisure time making music. It currently consists of five ensembles: a big choir, a chamber choir, two symphony orchestras, and a big band. There are frequently events on which the Collegium Musicum plays, for instance on ceremonies.

=== Structure ===
With 12 academic departments (Fachbereiche) and three interdisciplinary central institutes, the university can be seen as an universitas litterarum (a traditional university where studies in all basic sciences is possible). Despite the variety of subjects, apart from computer science, studies in the field of engineering can only be done at Technische Universität Berlin or universities of applied science (Fachhochschulen).

Academic Departments of Free University of Berlin
Department/School	Institutes/subunits
Department of Biology, Chemistry, Pharmacy	Institute of Biology; Institute of Chemistry and Biochemistry; Institute of Pharmacy
Department of Earth Sciences	Institute of Geographical Sciences; Institute of Geological Sciences; Institute of Meteorology
Department of History and Cultural Studies	Friedrich Meinecke Institute of History; Art History; Ancient Studies; East Asia and the Middle East; Institute of Jewish Studies
Department of Law	Civil law/private law; Criminal law; Public law
School of Business and Economics	Business Administration; Economics
Department of Mathematics and Computer Science	Research; Institute of Mathematics; Institute of Computer Science
Department of Education and Psychology	Education; Psychology
Department of Philosophy and Humanities	Institute of Philosophy; Institute of Greek and Latin Languages and Literatures; Peter Szondi Institute of Comparative Literature; Institute of German and Dutch Languages and Literatures; Institute of Romance Languages and Literatures; Institute of English Language and Literature; Institute of Theater Studies
Department of Physics	Institute of Experimental Physics; Institute of Theoretical Physics; Physics Education
Department of Political and Social Science	Otto Suhr Institute of Political Science; Institute of Sociology; Institute for Media and Communication Studies; Institute of Social and Cultural Anthropology
Department of Veterinary Medicine	Institute of Veterinary Anatomy; Institute of Veterinary Physiology; Institute of Veterinary Biochemistry; Institute of Animal Nutrition; Institute of Virology; Institute of Immunology; Institute of Microbiology and Epizootics; Institute of Food Safety and Hygiene; Institute for Animal Hygiene and Environmental Health; Institute of Animal Welfare, Animal Behavior, and Laboratory Animal Science; Institute of Veterinary Pathology; Institute of Parasitology and Tropical Veterinary Medicine; Institute of Pharmacology and Toxicology; Institute of Poultry Diseases; Institute for Veterinary Epidemiology and Biostatistics; Equine Clinic; Ruminant and Swine Clinic; Animal Reproduction Clinic; Small Animal Clinic
Medical School Charité – Universitätsmedizin Berlin	

=== Interdisciplinary Central Institutes ===
- John F. Kennedy Institute for North American Studies
- Institute for East European Studies
- Institute for Latin American Studies

== Academics ==
=== Admissions ===
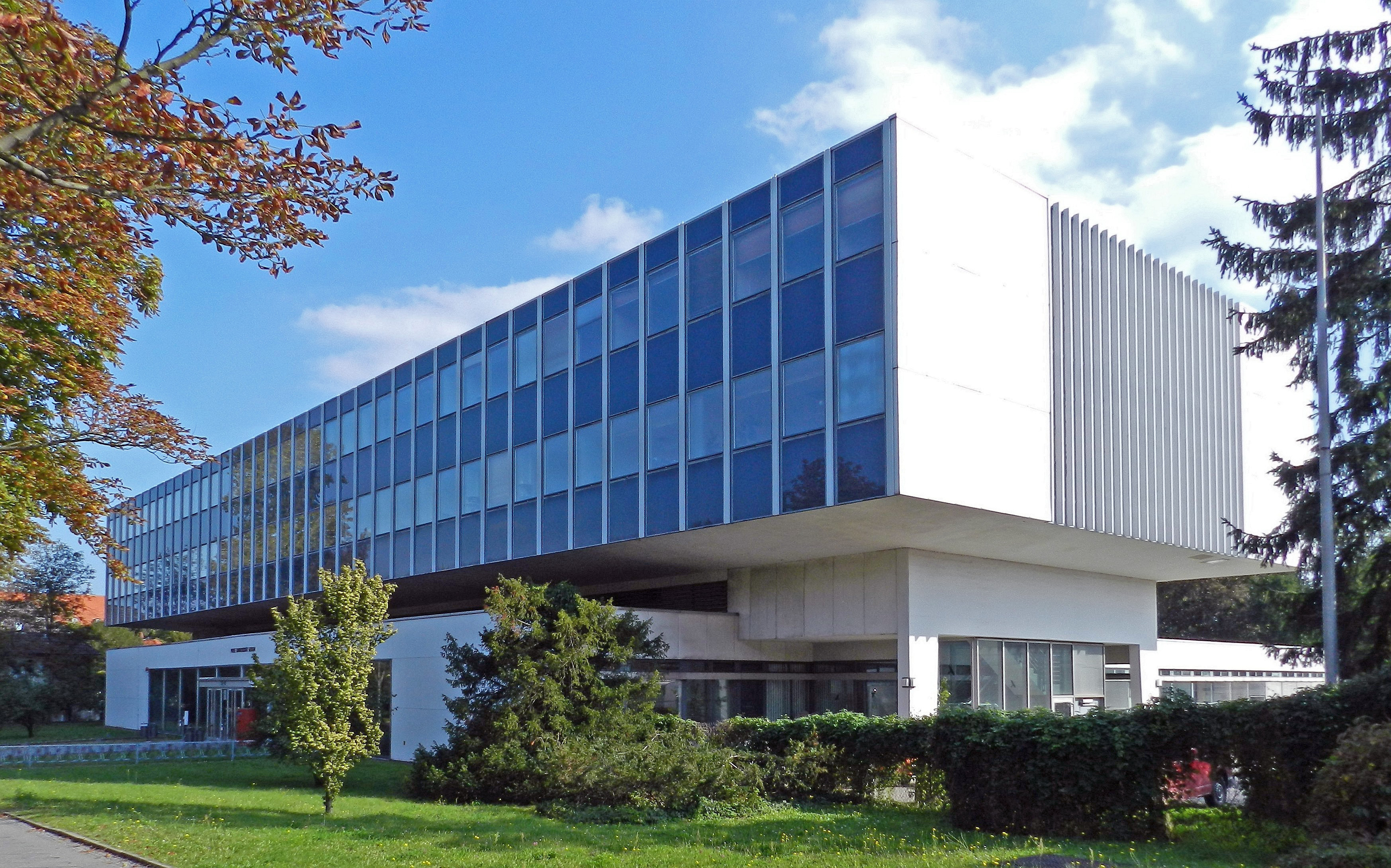
Institute of plant physiology and microbiology – Dept. of Biology, Chemistry, Pharmacy

With 33,000 applicants for the undergraduate programs (Bachelor) in 2013, admissions at Free University of Berlin remain highly competitive as the university only offers about 4,300 places each year. Due to the high numbers of applicants, most undergraduate programs at Free University of Berlin have limitations determined through the NC.

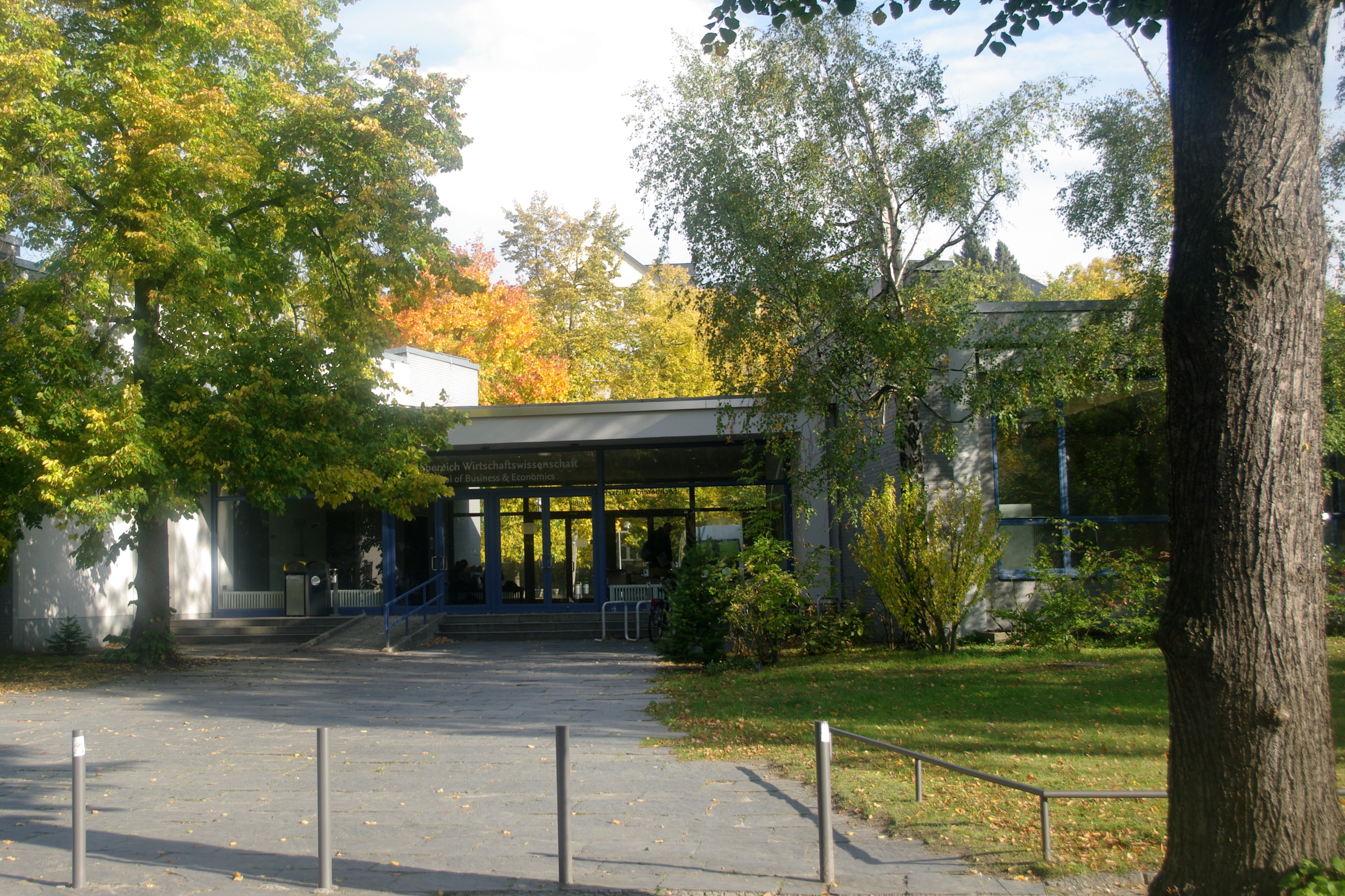
School of Business and Economics

In some cases (especially Medicine, Psychology and Political Science), the NC every year is as high as 1.0 (see Grades in Germany and Abitur).

Critical applicants which just scored slightly below the NC can be invited to a selective interview or an entry exam, depending on the department/faculty. Applicants at Charité medical school who do not directly fulfill the NC-criteria have to pass an entry exam, which covers the basic fields of Mathematics, Biology, Chemistry, and Physics in addition to passing a selective interview. Both results are then added to the Abitur grade. The final decision depends on the results of the competitors.

=== Teaching and learning ===
Free University of Berlin operates on a semester calendar where the winter term begins on 1 October and ends on 31 March. The exact same model can be found at almost every university in Germany. The time when lectures are being held varies each year, normally beginning around mid-October and ending as early as mid-February. Free University of Berlin offers a broad spectrum of subjects in over 190 degree programs. A speciality of the FU is the possibility to study a vast number of "small subjects" (e.g. theater and film studies, Egyptology, Byzantine studies, Jewish studies, Turkology, Sinology, Communication studies, Meteorology, Bioinformatics, Biochemistry) with a high level of specialization. Due to the Bologna process, most of the undergraduate programs are now leading to the three-year Bachelor's degree with 180 ECTS. At the Free University of Berlin, Bachelor programs are generally divided into three categories: a regular Bachelor called "Mono-Bachelor", a combined Bachelor ("Kombi-Bachelor") consisting of two fields of study, and a combined Bachelor with a teaching option. Besides the core subject(s), all students are required to complete a series of courses related to general professional skills (ABV).

The old Diplom and Magister artium programs are still running, but do not accept new admissions anymore. In the fields of Medicine, Veterinary Medicine, Dentistry, Pharmacy, and Law, students enroll in programs with Staatsexamen. Free University of Berlin also offers a variety of graduate degrees, from the master's degree to doctoral degrees.

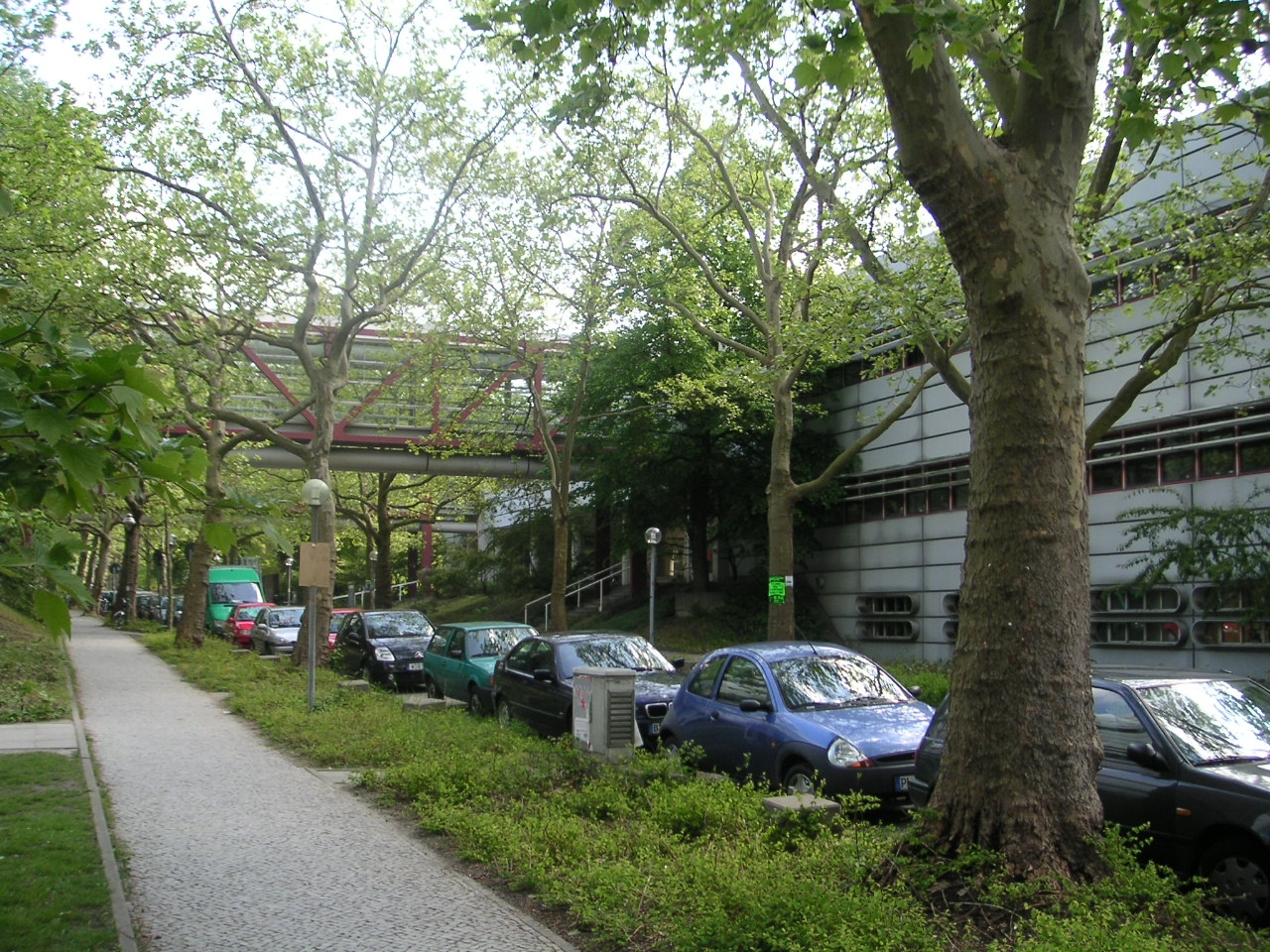
Institute of Theoretical Physics – Dept. of Physics

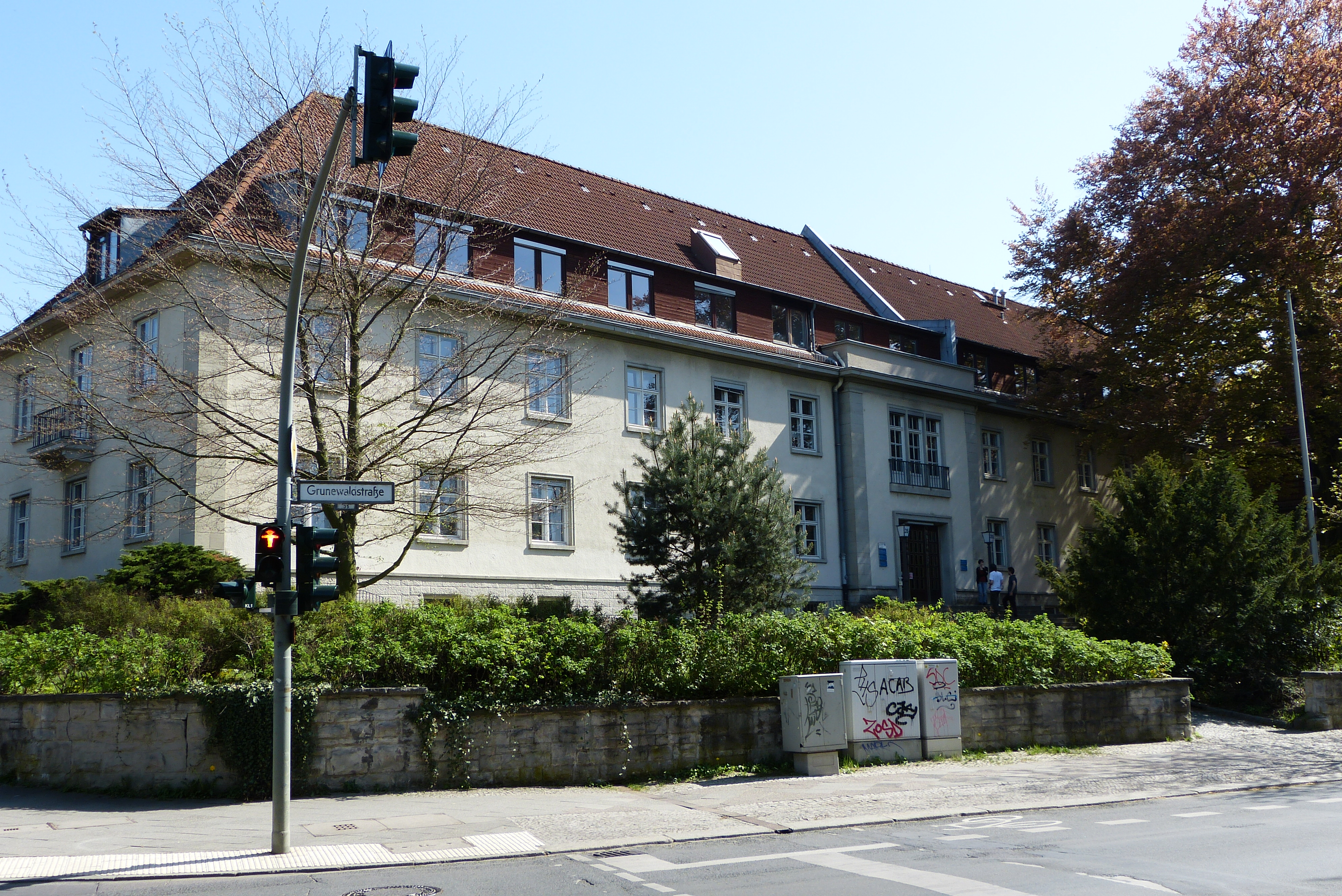
Institute of Theatre studies

Apart from the regular Master's programs, there are a variety of international programs taught in English, especially in the life sciences.

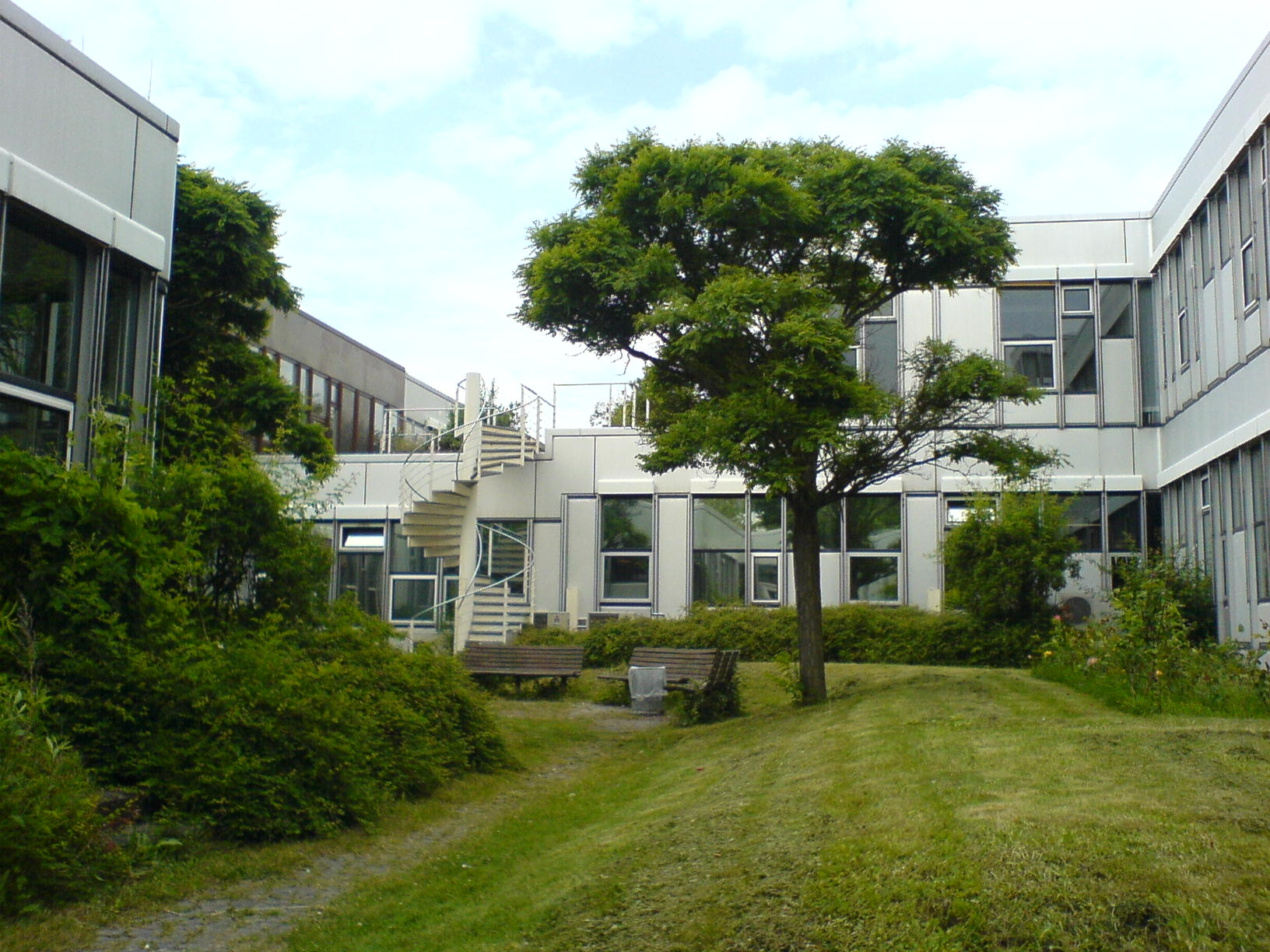
One of the courtyards in the Silberlaube

Free University of Berlin does not charge any tuition fees in the classical sense. Since 2003, public universities in Berlin introduced the model of semester contributions (Semesterbeiträge). It consists of an enrollment/re-registration fee, a contribution to the student union (Studentenwerk), a contribution for the student government and the fee for the semester ticket (public transportation pass) for the current semester. The fees for the semester ticket is defined by a contract with the local transportation company, the Verkehrsverbund Berlin-Brandenburg and allows students to move freely in the ABC zones of Berlin. In the winter semester of 2013/14, students are required to pay €285.83 in total. Since 2011, the Free University of Berlin has participated in the national "Germany Scholarship" program organized by the federal government, universities, and numerous private companies.

=== Research ===
In terms of external endowments by the DFG, Free University of Berlin ranks third behind the RWTH Aachen University and LMU Munich. Between 2009 and 2013, 289 foreign guest researchers came to the university through fellowships granted by the renowned Alexander von Humboldt Foundation, making the FU the most popular destination for foreign researchers in Germany.

In the field of natural sciences, research focuses on basic research with a strong emphasis on interdisciplinarity, whereas research in the humanities focuses on the current economical, political and cultural development of society (transformation processes, effects of globalization and environmental politics). In the field of Earth sciences, the FU has contributed to various aeronautical missions, e.g. the Mars Express and the Cassini-Huygens to Saturn.

Excluding the Charité medical school, which is co-administered by the university with the Humboldt University, Free University of Berlin is currently the lead university for eight collaborative research centers of the German Research Foundation and also has five DFG research units. It is part of the Berlin University Alliance.

==== Interdisciplinary centers ====
- Ancient World
- Art and Aesthetics
- Ecosystem Dynamics in Central Asia
- Efficient Mathematical modeling
- European Languages: Structures – Development – Comparison (ZEUS)
- Historical Anthropology
- Middle Ages – Renaissance – Early Modern Times
- Research on Teaching and Learning
- Social and Cultural History of the Middle East
- Berlin Center for European Studies (BEST)
- Berlin Center for Caspian Region Studies
- The Center for Modern Greece (Centrum Modernes Griechenland/CeMoG)

==== Graduate schools ====
- Berlin Mathematical School
- Graduate School of North American Studies
- Friedrich Schlegel Graduate School of Literary Studies
- Muslim Cultures and Societies
- Berlin-Brandenburg School for Regenerative Therapies
- Berlin School of Integrative Oncology
- Graduate School of East Asian Studies

==== Clusters of Excellence ====
- Languages of Emotion
- The Formation and Transformation of Space and Knowledge in Ancient Civilizations
- NeuroCure – Towards a Better Outcome of Neurological Disorders
- Unifying Concepts in Catalysis (together with the TU Berlin, HU Berlin and the University of Potsdam)

As part of the MATHEON – Mathematics for Key Technologies research center of the DFG, Free University of Berlin together with the TU Berlin, HU Berlin and the Zuse Institute Berlin is working on mathematical modeling, simulation and optimization of real-world processes.

Between 1974 and 2012, the Free University of Berlin hosted 102 Dahlem Conferences, at which internationally renowned scholars and Nobel laureates were invited to discuss current problems in natural, physical and social sciences and the humanities, with the aim of promoting interdisciplinary exchange of scientific information and ideas and stimulating international cooperation in research.

The annual "Einstein Lectures Dahlem" hosted by the university and several external institutions since 2005 are dedicated to Albert Einstein, who was the first Director of the Kaiser Wilhelm Institute for Physics for more than 15 years (1917-1933). It is an colloquium which presents fields in science which were influenced by Einstein's thinking.

=== Rankings ===
University rankings

Overall – Global & National
QS World 2026	▲88	4
THE World 2026	▼113	9

The 2024 British QS World University Rankings ranked the university 98th internationally and 4th in Germany. In the 2024 Times Higher Education World University Rankings, the university is ranked 102nd internationally and 9th in Germany. Owing to an unresolved dispute over the counting of Nobel laureates before the Second World War, as both the Humboldt University and the Free University claim to be successors of the pre-War University of Berlin, neither university has been listed in the 'Shanghai Ranking' or Academic Ranking of World Universities (ARWU) since 2004.

In the 2023 QS Subject Ranking, Free University of Berlin ranks first in Germany in English, modern languages, politics, and sociology. In the 2023 THE Subject Ranking, Free University of Berlin ranks first in Germany in the social sciences. In the 2022 ARWU Subject Ranking, Free University of Berlin ranks first in Germany in human biological sciences and pharmacy, while sharing the first place in biomedical engineering, law, and nursing.

QS World University Rankings by Subject 2023
Subject	Global	National
Arts & Humanities	▲27	2
Linguistics	101–150	4–10
Theology, Divinity and Religious Studies	51–100	7–10
Archaeology	▼17	▼3
Classics and Ancient History	▼20	▼4
English Language and Literature	▼43	1
History	▼28	▼2
Modern Languages	▼28	1
Philosophy	▼38	4
Engineering and Technology	▼310	13
Computer Science and Information Systems	201–250	9–12
Life Sciences & Medicine	201	12
Anatomy and Physiology	▲51–100	▲2–6
Biological Sciences	▲80	▲5
Pharmacy and Pharmacology	▼77	▼5
Psychology	▼94	3
Veterinary Science	▲46	2
Natural Sciences	▲104	▲8–9
Chemistry	▼90	7
Earth and Marine Sciences	101–150	▼7–13
Geography	▲30	2
Geology	101–150	7–13
Geophysics	101–150	▼7–13
Mathematics	▲113	▲5–6
Physics and Astronomy	▼140	▼12
Social Sciences & Management	▼106	▼3
Accounting and Finance	▼201–250	6–7
Anthropology	▼32	▼2
Business and Management Studies	▼201–250	5–8
Communication and Media Studies	▲39	2
Economics and Econometrics	151–200	▲5–8
Education and Training	101–150	▲2–5
Law and Legal Studies	▲69	4
Politics	▼20	1
Social Policy and Administration	51–100	1–2
Sociology	▼30	▲1

THE World University Rankings by Subject 2024
Subject	Global	National
Arts & humanities	▼32	4
Business & economics	▲126–150	▲5–6
Computer science	▲176–200	▲15–16
Education	▼99	5
Law	▼ =77	▼6
Life sciences	▼82	▲7
Physical sciences	▼101–125	▼10–11
Psychology	▲ =74	5
Social sciences	▼36	1

ARWU Global Ranking of Academic Subjects 2023
Subject	Global	National
Natural Sciences
Physics	301–400	24–28
Chemistry	101–150	▲5–9
Earth Sciences	▼101–150	▼5–10
Ecology	101–150	▼9–12
Atmospheric Science	201–300	▲13–22
Engineering
Biomedical Engineering	▼101–150	▼2–5
Computer Science & Engineering	401–500	11–16
Materials Science & Engineering	201–300	8–13
Nanoscience & Nanotechnology	151–200	6–7
Environmental Science & Engineering	201–300	7–12
Biotechnology	▼101–150	▲2–7
Life Sciences
Biological Sciences	▲48	▲3
Human Biological Sciences	35	1
Agricultural Sciences	▼201–300	9–15
Veterinary Sciences	▼34	▲2
Medical Sciences
Clinical Medicine	▲48	▼3
Public Health	▲41	▲1
Dentistry & Oral Sciences	▲36	▲1
Nursing	▼101–150	1–2
Medical Technology	▼45	▲6
Pharmacy & Pharmaceutical Sciences	▼27	1
Social Sciences
Economics	301–400	▲14–22
Statistics	151–200	7–11
Law	151–200	1–2
Political Sciences	▲51–75	▲3–4
Sociology	151–200	9–11
Education	▼301–400	▲6–18
Communication	▲51–75	▲4–6
Psychology	▲76–100	5–6
Business Administration	▼301–400	▼9–12
Management	▼401–500	▼14–21
Public Administration	▼101–150	▼4–6

In 2020, the American U.S. News & World Report listed Free University of Berlin as the 111th best in the world, climbing five positions. Being among the 100 best in the world in 18 areas of 28 ranked.

In the German "ExcellenceRanking" of the CHE (Center for Higher Education Development) in 2013, Free University of Berlin ranks top in the fields of Biology, Chemistry, Physics and Political science. In the CHE "SubjectRanking", Freie Universität has been evaluated as one of Germany's best universities in Earth sciences, Computer science and Philosophy and also ranks among the Top 5 in Psychology, English studies and Education.

== Global partnerships ==
Free University of Berlin maintains wide-ranging international contacts with top universities and organizations, which provide key impulses for research and teaching. The Free University of Berlin has established partnerships with leading universities in the United States such as the University of California System (notably UC Berkeley, UCLA and UC Santa Cruz), the University of Chicago, Cornell University, Stanford University (which also has a small campus within the FU), Duke University, Princeton University, Yale University, and Columbia University. In addition to Western European universities such as the University of Oxford, the University of Cambridge, University College London, the University of Sussex and the École Normale Supérieure in Paris.

The university is a founding member of the global educational center for the study of transnational law, the Centre for Transnational Legal Studies in London. First contacts with universities in Eastern Europe were made in the 1970s. In the 1990s, links were in particular extended to include growing numbers of institutions in Canada (McGill University, University of Alberta, York University), Eastern Europe, and the Far East (China: Peking University, Fudan University, Nanjing University, Shanghai Jiao Tong University; Japan: University of Tokyo, Kyoto University, Nagoya University, Waseda University; South Korea: Korea University, Yonsei University, Seoul National University). The newly established Centre for International Cooperation (CIC) concentrates on identifying new strategic partners for international projects.

Today, Free University of Berlin has established over 400 partnerships in five continents, many of them as part of the European ERASMUS program. Every year, about 600 visiting scientists contribute to the university teaching and research. For the grant programs in Germany, the Free University of Berlin is one of the first choices both for the ERASMUS and Tempus as well as for the Fulbright program and the international programs of the German Academic Exchange Service (DAAD). An International Summer and Winter University (FUBiS) has been set up for international students offering (semi-)intensive German courses and numerous subject courses.

=== International branch offices ===
The Free University of Berlin operates foreign branch offices in New York City, Brussels, Moscow, Beijing, Cairo, São Paulo, and New Delhi. The foreign branch offices work to expand upon cooperation partnerships already existing with universities in the country.

In April 2005, the Free University of Berlin, in conjunction with LMU Munich, opened a joint representative office in New York. This German University Alliance, located in German House, the seat of the German Consulate General and the German UN Mission, represents the interests of the two universities in the United States and Canada and works to increase the exchange of students and scientists.

In addition, the Free University of Berlin, as the first German institution of higher education, founded an alumni and fundraising organization, the Friends of the Freie Universität Berlin (FFUB) in New York. Since 2003 this organization has maintained close contact with alumni and scientists of the Free University of Berlin in the U.S. and attempts to gain alumni and friends as sponsors, to strengthen the long-lasting trans-Atlantic relations. Some of the proceeds from these fundraising activities were contributed to the renovation of the Henry Ford Building.

In April 2006 Peking University opened its first branch in Germany. Its objectives include the promotion of knowledge of Chinese culture, the cultivation of Chinese-German cooperation, and the spread of the Chinese language. Duke University in Durham, North Carolina, has a Berlin program (Duke in Berlin) that is held in cooperation with the Free University of Berlin and Humboldt University. The University of California System organizes programs for American students in Berlin and Potsdam. The UC System maintains an office at the Free University of Berlin to attend to the needs of exchange students from the California campuses.

The Office of Global Programs of Columbia University in New York administers the Berlin Consortium for German Studies. Students from Columbia University and the other colleges and universities included in the consortium (University of Chicago, Cornell University, Johns Hopkins University, University of Pennsylvania, Princeton University, and Vassar College) can attend classes at the Free University of Berlin for one or two semesters as external students. This temporary enrollment is preceded by a six-week intensive language program.

== Notable people ==
Alumni of the Free University of Berlin include several scientists, philosophers and politicians, amongst them five Nobel Prize winners and 18 Leibniz laureates.

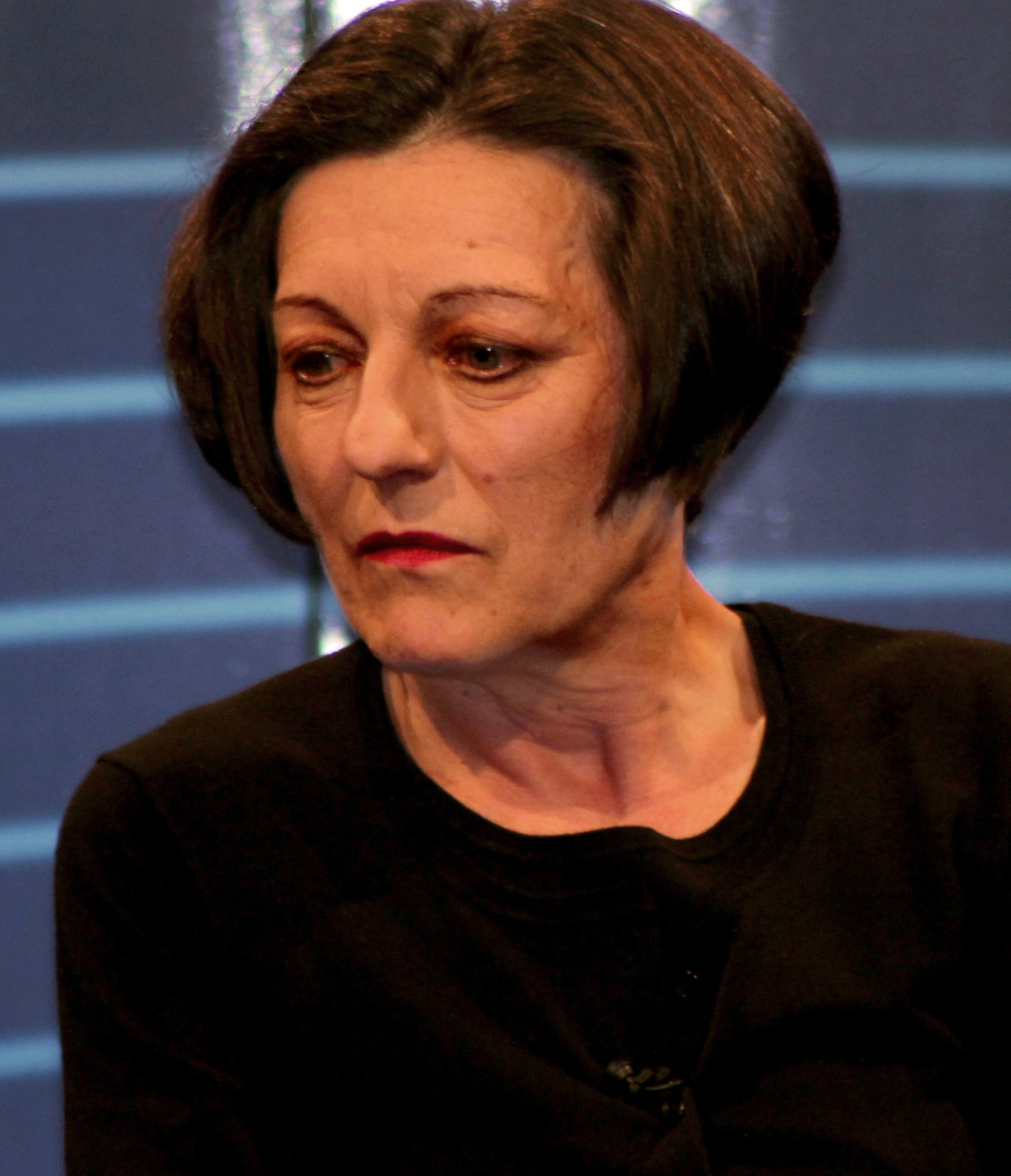
Herta Müller, novelist and Nobel Prize in Literature laureate

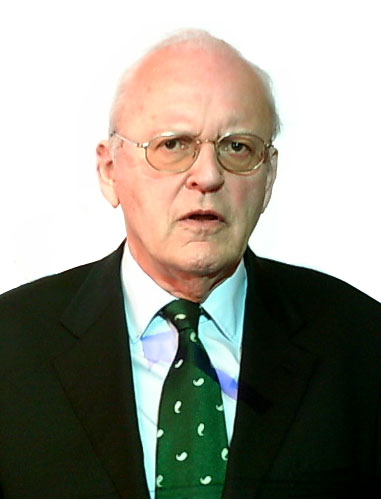
Roman Herzog, former President of Germany

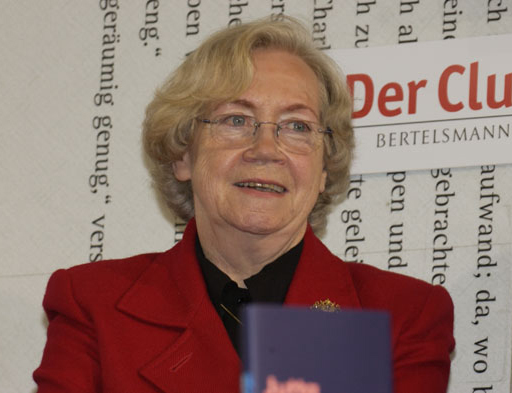
Jutta Limbach, former president of the Federal Constitutional Court of Germany

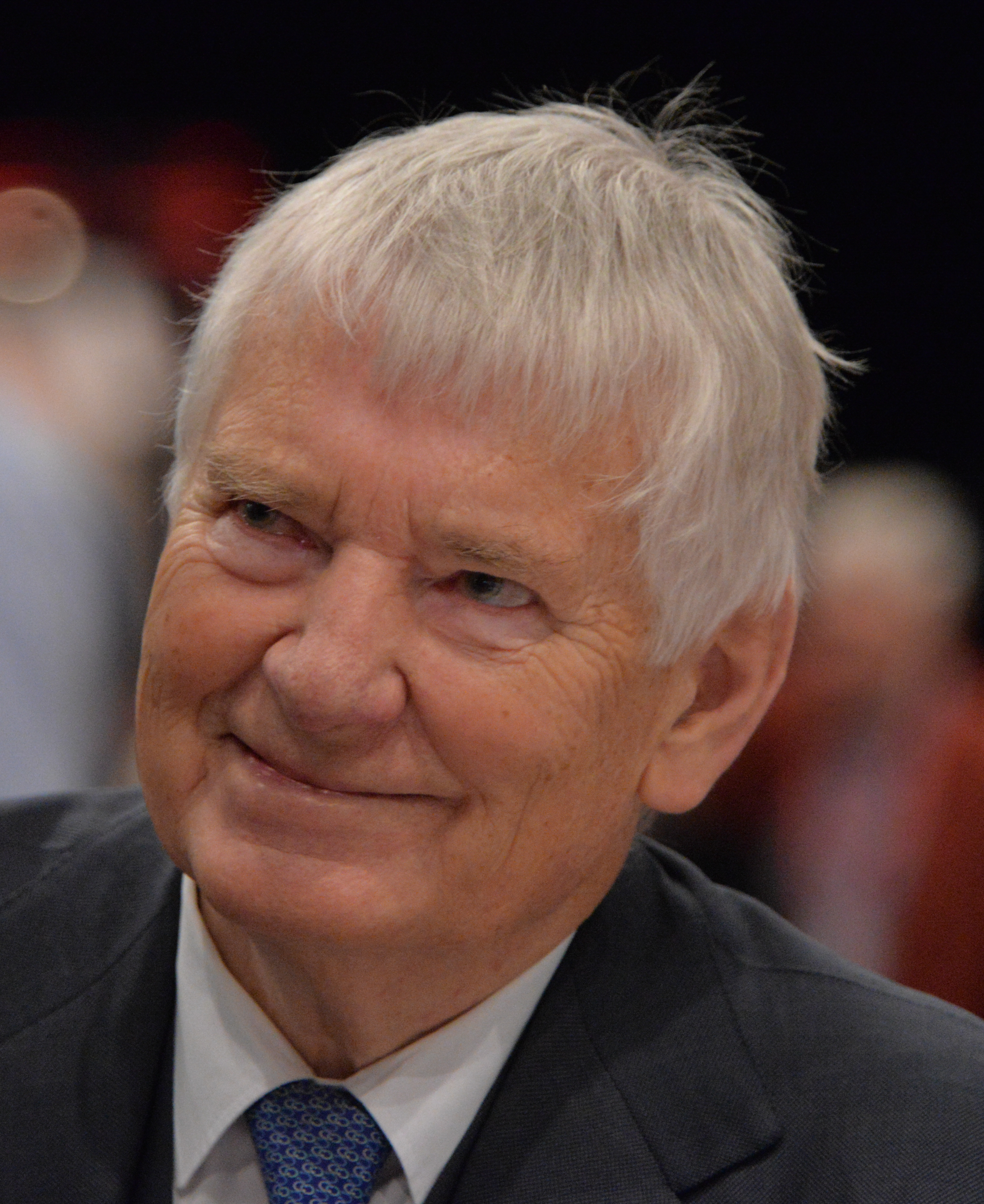
Otto Schily, former Federal Minister of the Interior of Germany

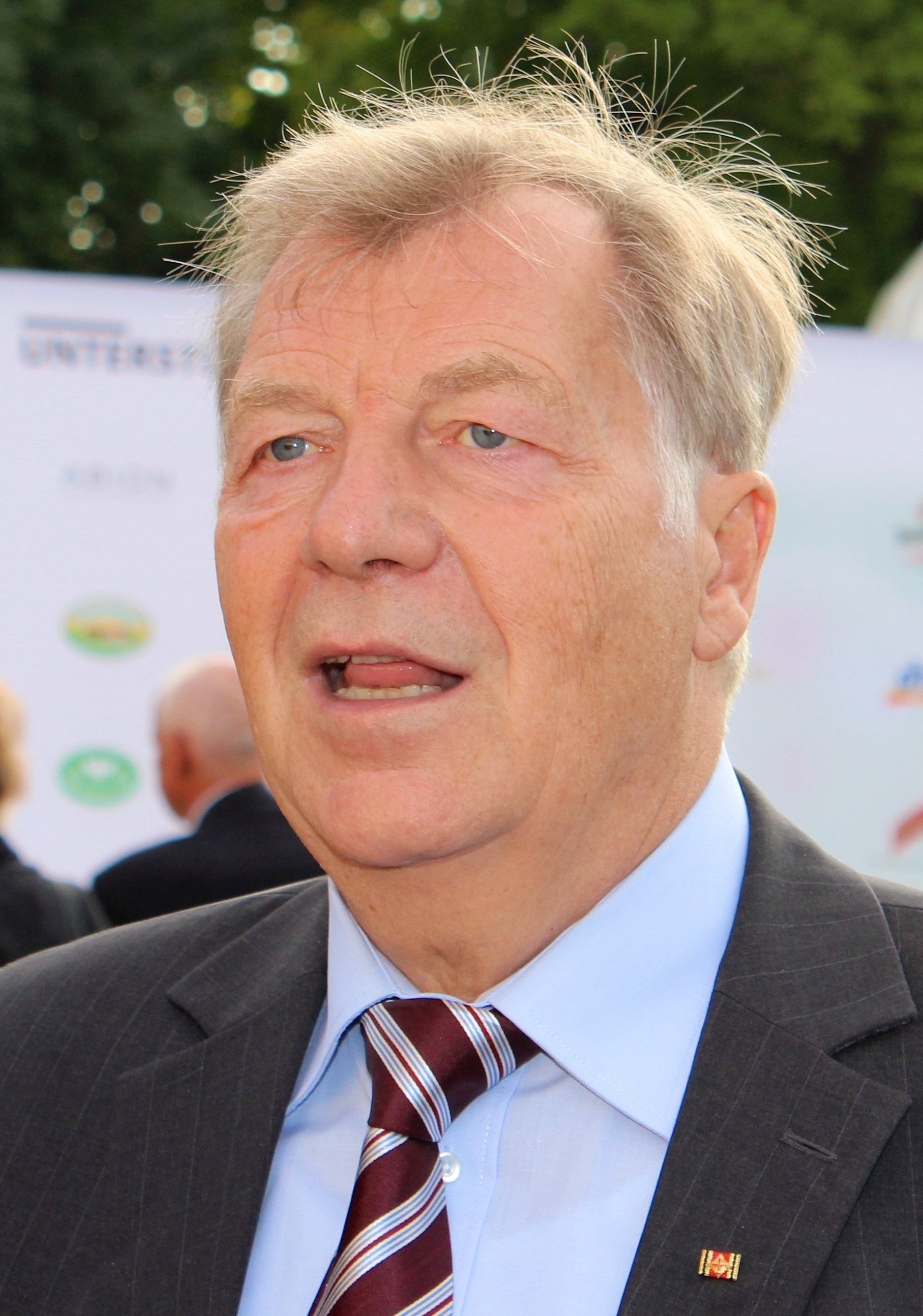
Eberhard Diepgen, politician, former Mayor of Berlin

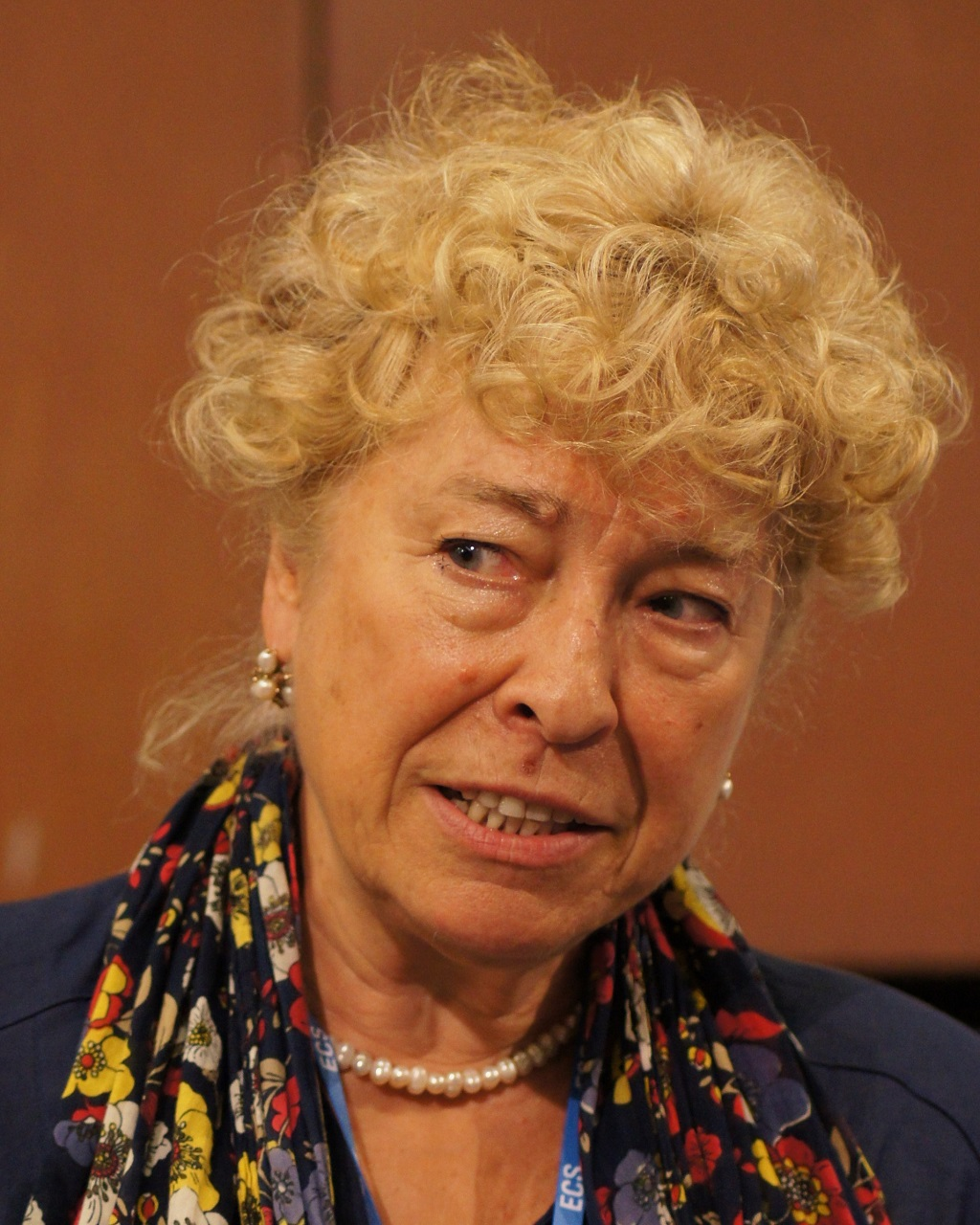
Gesine Schwan, political scientist, politician

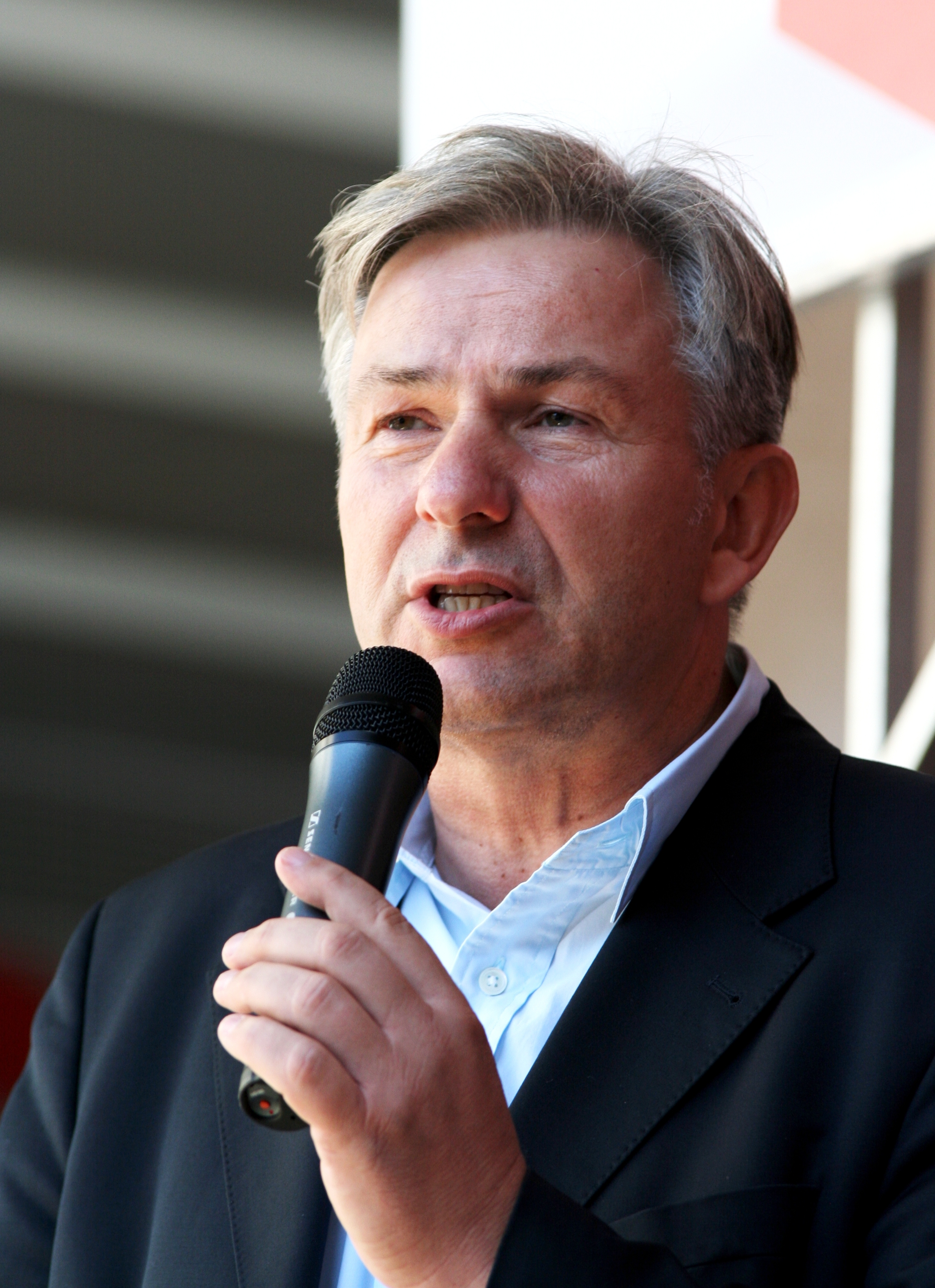
Klaus Wowereit, politician, former mayor of Berlin

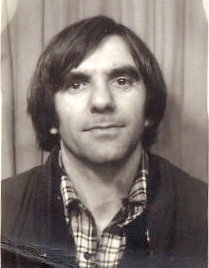
Rudi Dutschke, political activist, spokesperson of the German student movement

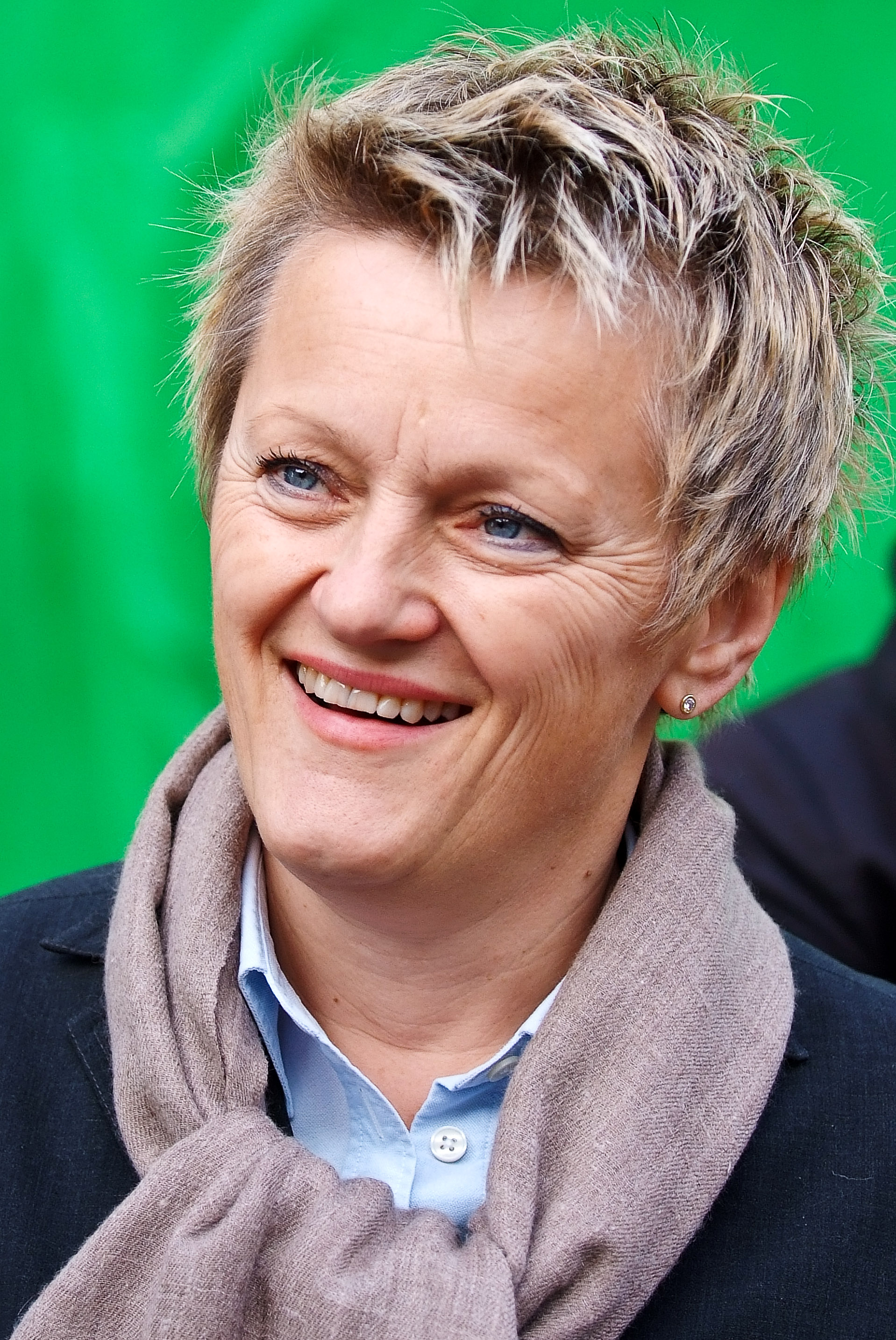
Renate Künast, politician, former Minister of Food and Agriculture, former Chairperson of Alliance 90/The Greens party

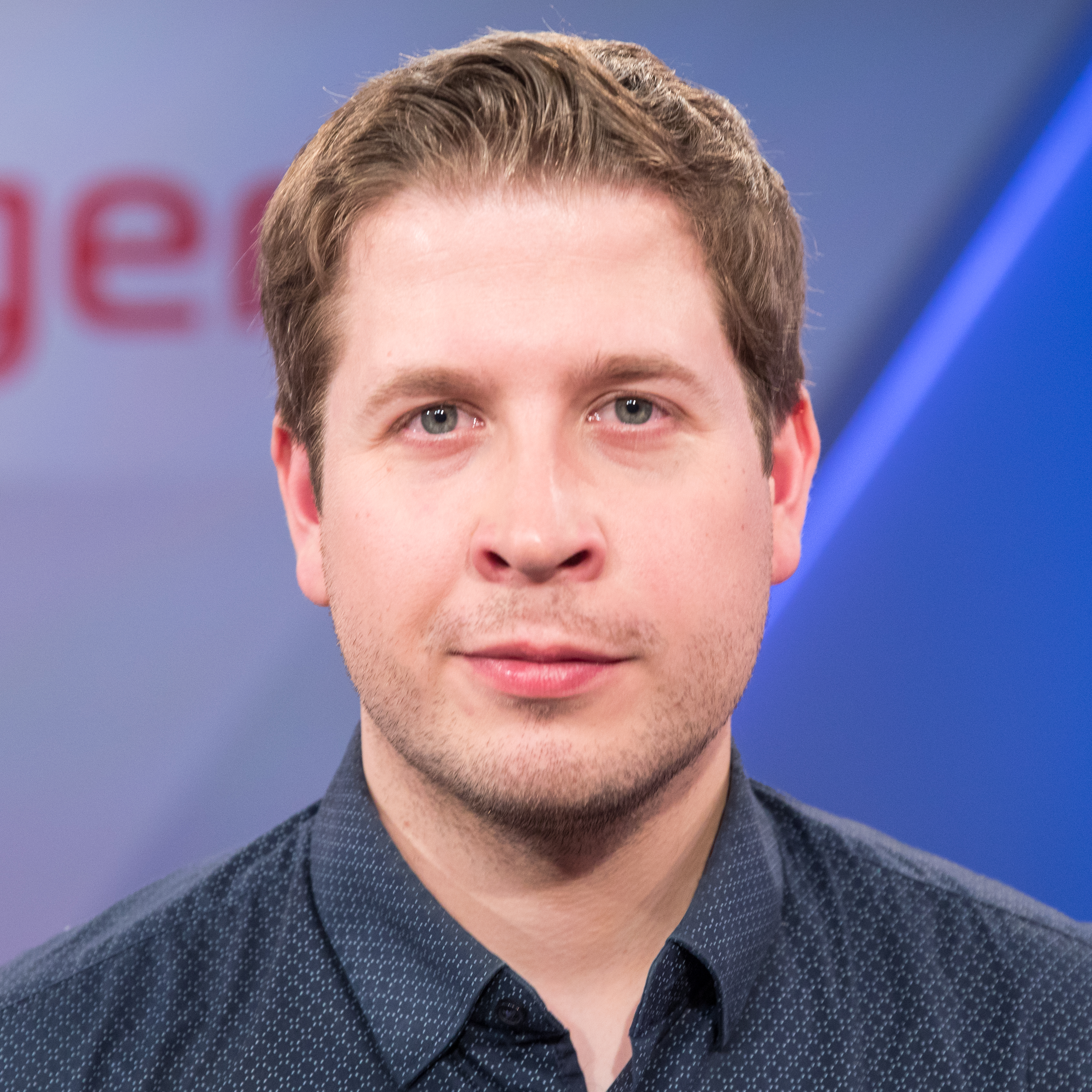
Kevin Kühnert, politician, General Secretary of the Social Democratic Party of Germany (SPD)

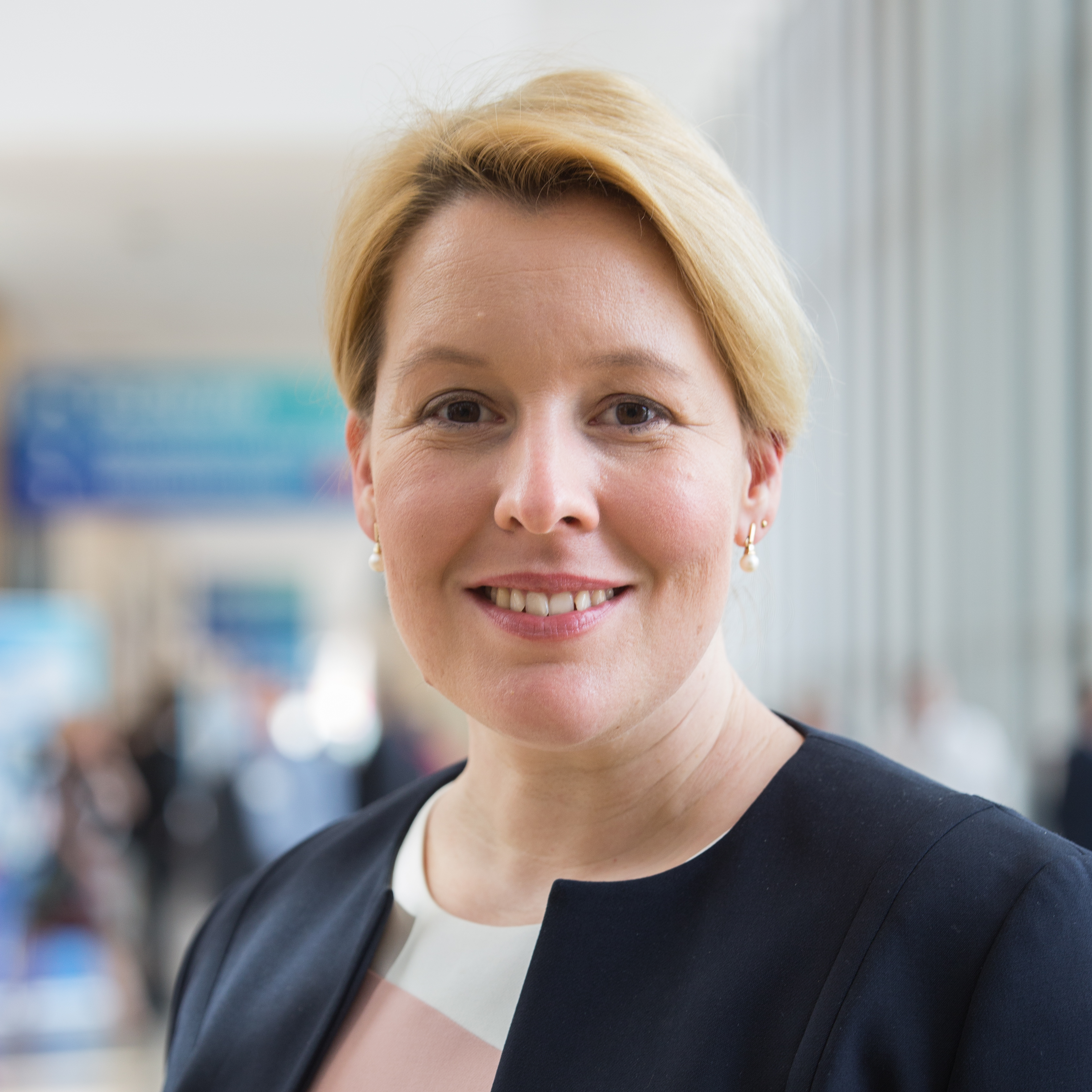
Franziska Giffey, politician, former Mayor of Berlin

== See also ==
- Universities and research institutions in Berlin
- Humboldt University of Berlin
- Technische Universität Berlin
- University of Potsdam
- List of split up universities
