= List of countries with United Nations Associations =

United Nations Associations are recognized in 92 United Nations member-States according to World Federation of United Nations Associations.

Flag of WFUNA, the federating body of all UN Associations

Here are all/most of the countries that have agreed to the UNA:

== Africa ==
- Benin
- Botswana
- Burkina Faso
- Burundi
- Côte d'Ivoire
- Democratic Republic of Congo
- Egypt
- Ethiopia
- Ghana
- Kenya
- Liberia
- Mauritius
- Morocco
- Nigeria
- Rwanda
- Somalia
- South Africa
- Sudan
- Tanzania
- Togo
- Tunisia
- Uganda
- Zimbabwe

== Asia ==
- Bangladesh
- Bhután
- China
- India
- Iran
- Japan
- Kyrgyz Republic
- Lebanon
- Malaysia
- Mongolia
- Nepal
- Pakistan
- Philippines
- Republic of Korea
- Singapore
- Sri Lanka
- Syria
- Thailand
- United Arab Emirates (UAE)

== Europe ==
- Albania
- Armenia
- Austria
- Belarus
- Belgium
- Bulgaria
- Croatia
- Cyprus
- Denmark
- Estonia
- England
- Finland
- France
- Georgia
- Germany
- Greece
- Hungary
- Iceland
- Ireland
- Israel
- Italy
- Lithuania
- Luxembourg
- Macedonia
- Netherlands
- Norway
- Portugal
- Romania
- Russia
- Serbia
- Slovenia
- Spain
- Sweden
- Switzerland
- Turkey
- United Kingdom
  - Scotland
  - Wales

== North America ==
- United Nations Association in Canada
- Asociación Cubana de las Naciones Unidas
- Asociación Dominicana de las Naciones Unidas
- Asociación Guatemalteca pro-Naciones Unidas
- United Nations Association of Jamaica
- Asociación Mexicana para las Naciones Unidas
- Asociacion Nicaraguense de Naciones Unidas
- United Nations Association of Trinidad and Tobago
- United Nations Association of the United States of America
- Cuba

== South America ==
- Argentina
- Bolivia
- Brazil
- Chile
- Colombia
- Ecuador
- Peru
- Suriname
- Venezuela
- Guyana
- Trinidad and Tobago
- Uruguay
- Paraguay
- Falkland Islands

== Oceania ==
- Australia
- New Zealand
- Melanesia countries
- Micronesia countries
- Polynesia countries

== Map of the Current United Nations Associations ==
Current United Nations Associations
- Offices of the WFUNA Secretariat Current United Nations Associations in Europe Current United Nations Associations in North America Current United Nations Associations in South America Current United Nations Associations in Asia Current United Nations Associations in Oceania
