= UNAT =

UNAT may refer to:

- United Nations Administrative Tribunal (1950–2009)
- United Nations Appeals Tribunal, formed in 2009 to replace the United Nations Administrative Tribunal
- United Nations Association of Thailand
- U_{nat}, a symbol for natural uranium
