= United Nations Youth Associations Network =

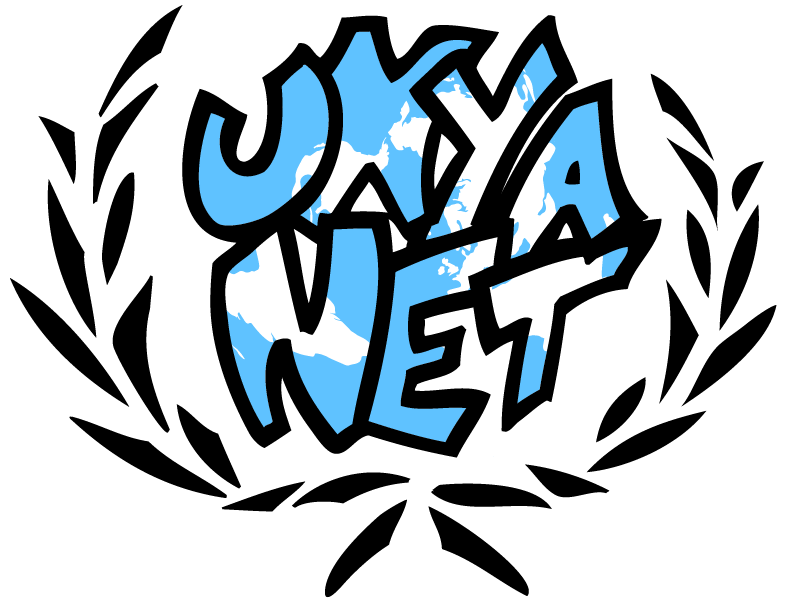
Logo
Basic Data
Founded:	August 5, 2011
Founded in:	Vienna
Members:	10 Member Associations; 3 Observers (as of: September 2012)
Website:	www.unyanet.org

The United Nations Youth Associations Network (UNYANET) is the international network for United Nations Youth Associations (UNYAs) and United Nations Associations-Youth Sections (UNA-Youth Sections).

In August 2011, youth representatives of the national UNYAs from Austria, Finland, Germany, Norway, Romania and Switzerland, as well as representatives of the UNA-Youth Sections from Russia, Serbia, Slovenia, Spain and Turkey met at the United Nations Office at Vienna to establish UNYANET. Since then, UNYANET held events such as a Media Workshop in November 2011 in Switzerland or the third edition of the Youth Projects and Cooperation Seminar, which took place in Izmir, September 2012.

== General ==
UNYANET has the aim to enhance the network by facilitating the process of developing projects, the exchange of knowledge, resources and experience and the development of a common identity among member associations. This shall be achieved, on one hand, by regular meetings of the member associations, on the other hand by projects carried out by different working groups of UNYANET. Furthermore, UNYANET shall facilitate the cooperation between its member associations, the United Nations and other international organizations, institutions and supporters by providing a common contact point for various topics including cooperation requests, project proposals etc. Another important aim is to provide assistance to groups, willing to establish a UNYA in their country. At the moment, UNYANET has 10 member associations and 3 observers, with altogether 57 local branches and approximately 14000 individual members. UNYANET currently assists in the establishment of 3 other UNYAs.

Partners of UNYANET are the United Nations Information Service Vienna (UNIS Vienna and the United Nations Information Service Geneva (UNIS Geneva). Furthermore, UNYANET is working together with the United Nations Department of Public Information (UNDPI).

== Projects/Programs ==
- UNYANET-Advice
