= Ajith C. S. Perera =

Sri Lankan cricket umpire (1956–2020)

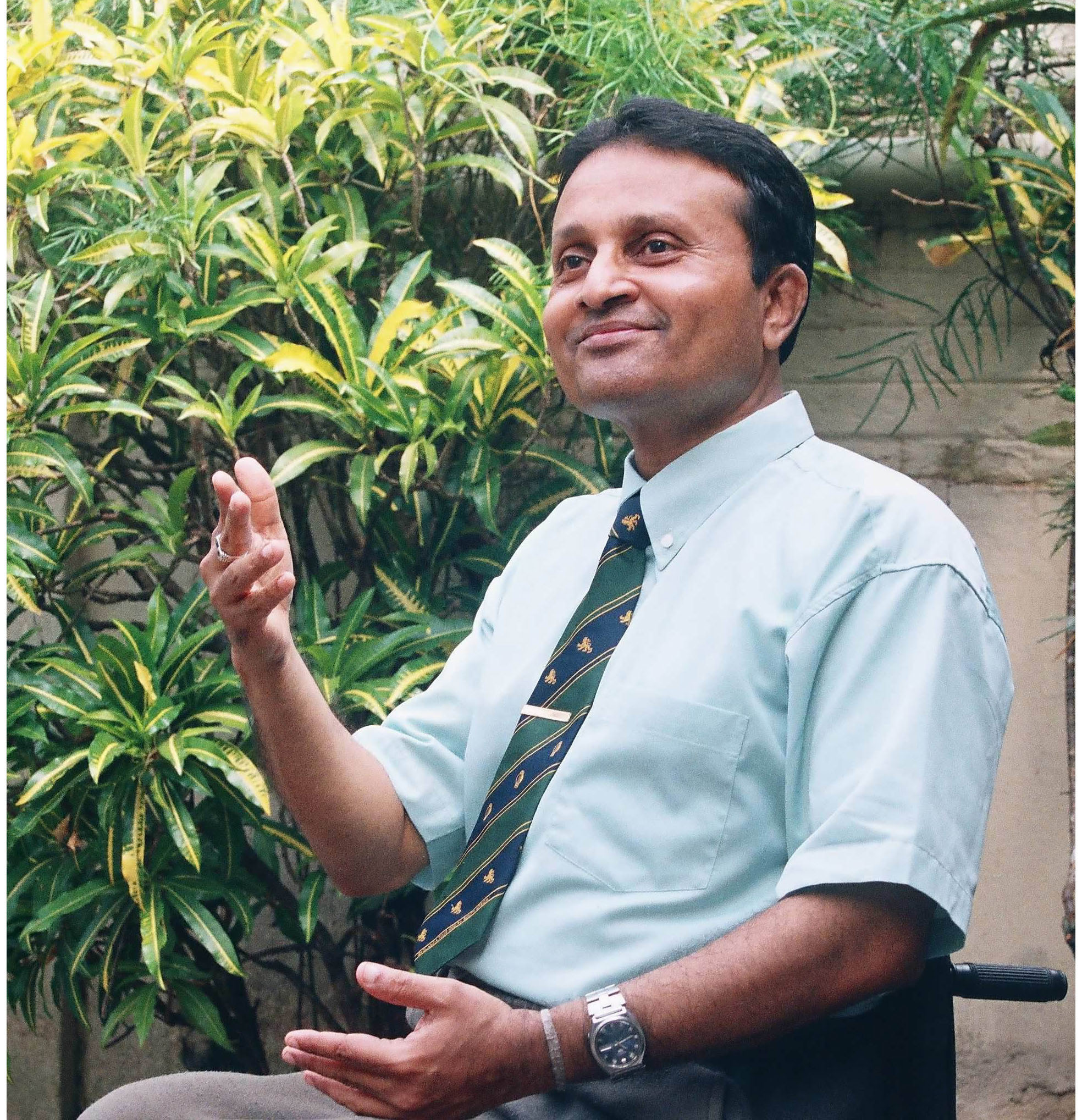
- Born: 29 February 1956; Galle, Sri Lanka (earlier Ceylon)
- Died: 29 October 2020 (aged 64); Colombo, Sri Lanka
- Education: Royal College Colombo, University of Sri Lanka-Colombo, University of Birmingham – England
- Occupations: Chartered Chemist, Chief Executive Idiriya, Former Test cricket Umpire, Former Senior Manager, Disability Activist; Accessibility adviser Accessibility auditor
- Parent(s): Commodore M. G. S. Perera, Maureen Johanna Perera

Ajith Chrysantha Stephen Perera, JP, CChem., FRSC (29 February 1956 – 29 October 2020) was a Chartered Chemist by profession, a scholar, a former senior manager in industry, a qualified training instructor, also a former test-match-panel cricket umpire.

The international admiration Perera has won and the national recognition he has gained have come through his achievements, acquired both in Sri Lanka and in England in different fields: cricket, analytical chemistry and quality assurance, in all of which he was academically and professionally well qualified and widely experienced.

Almost on the eve of umpiring his first cricket test match in Colombo, Sri Lanka vs New Zealand, a large wayside tree crashed on and straddled his moving car, killing his chauffeur and leaving him instantaneously a paraplegic for life.

He was a writer, speaker, author and a disability rights activist - as a fervent advocate for inclusion of all people by design - most importantly as a widely experienced and highly competent accessibility adviser and assessor, recognised by three learned societies and several reputed bodies overseas.

He was the founder and, as of 10 June 2020, held the honorary position of Chief Executive / Secretary-General of Idiriya, a registered, not-for-profit humanitarian service organisation in Sri Lanka.

== Early life ==
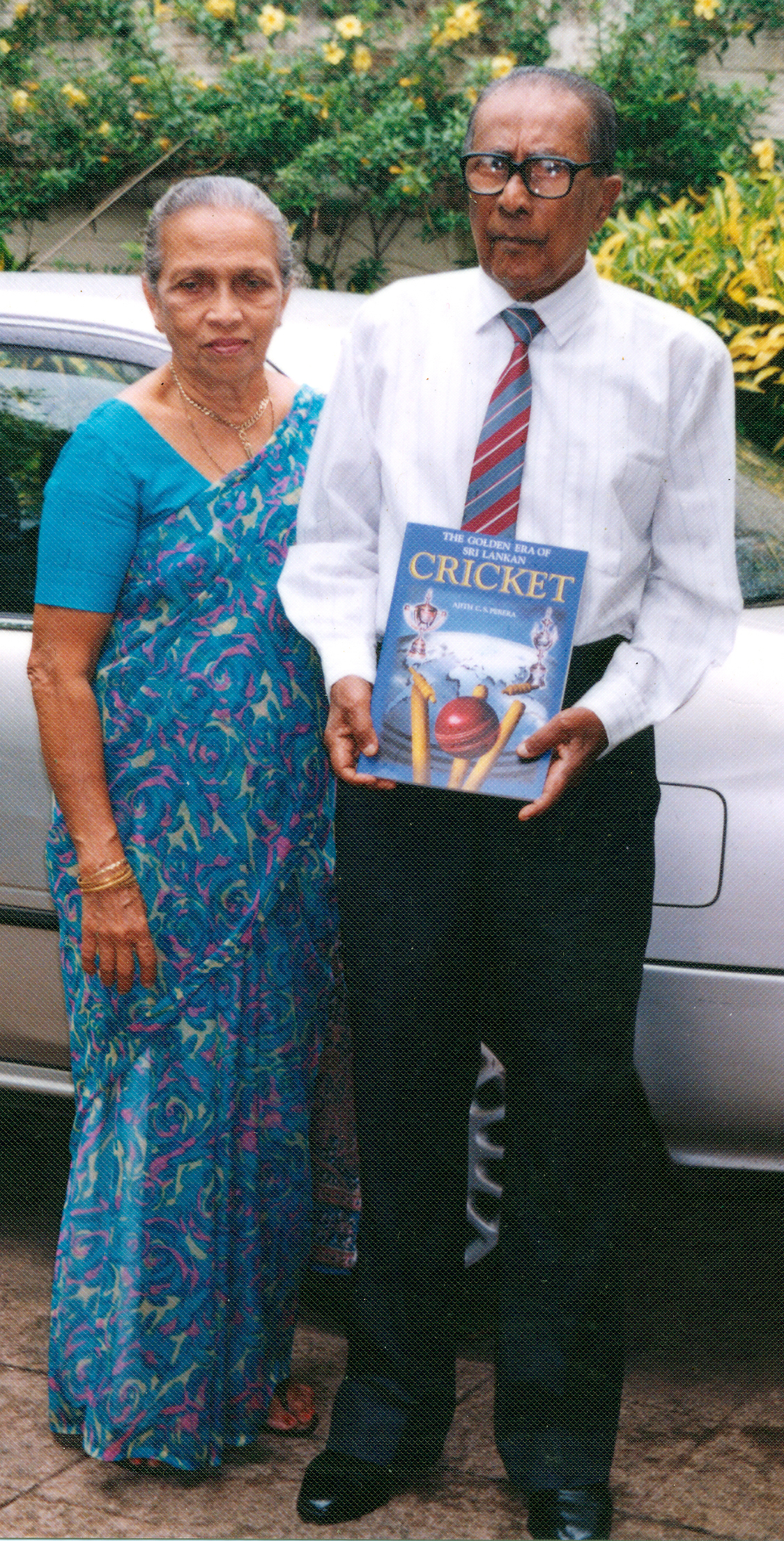
Perera's parents in 1999

Born to Instructor Commodore M. G. S. Perera (1 June 1917 – 10 August 1999), Founder and the First Commandant Naval & Maritime Academy Trincomalee, the First and Foremost Director of Naval Training, Royal Ceylon Navy, and former Senior Staff Captain / Nautical Instructor (Training of Deck Officer Cadets) Ceylon Shipping Corporation (1977–1983) and Maureen Johanna Perera (19 February 1924 - 22 October 2019), he has one sister, Deepthi C. J. Guneratne BSc (Botany), MSc (Soil Chemistry).

== Education ==
Perera completed his primary and secondary education at the Royal Primary School and the Royal College, Colombo and thereafter gained BSc (Honours) from the University of Sri Lanka, Colombo in May 1975, followed by a joint MSc from the University of Colombo and the University of Birmingham, England in July 1977. He thereby qualified professionally in the field of Analytical Chemistry, specialising in the subject of Quality Assurance, in which field his outstanding contributions were internationally recognised and awarded with an honorary PhD.

== Professional life: 1978–1992 ==
Perera is a Chartered Chemist (CChem.)by profession and a Registered Analytical Chemist of the Royal Society of Chemistry (RSC) in the United Kingdom. He is a Fellow (FRSC) of the RSC of which he is an honorary life member and the former hony. secretary / treasurer (1984–1992) of its section in Sri Lanka.

He is also a life member and a Fellow (FIChemC) of the Institute of Chemistry Ceylon and a Fellow (FIQA) of the Institute of Quality Assurance UK.

His professional career started in August 1978 as an assistant lecturer at the department of Chemistry, University of Colombo. His work thereafter in the multinational pharmaceutical manufacturing industry extended for almost 14 years, from September 1978 until July 1992.

Perera started his career in industry as a production executive with Glaxo Ceylon Limited and stayed until March 1982.

Mackwoods-Winthrop Limited then hired hm as the senior manager in charge of their quality assurance and analytical control divisions until March 1989, and thereafter as the senior manager of the newly established technical services department.

Perera then changed over to the cosmetics and healthcare industry when Hemas Manufacturing Limited invited him to join them in August 1992 as the Director – Senior Manager of quality assurance and product development.

But it was only 14 weeks service there for Perera, as a freak road accident on 12 November 1992 made him instantaneously a paraplegic for life and cut short tragically, at the age of 36, his professional career that was just blossoming out.

== Cricket Career: 1972 – ==
Considered as a unique feat, his Professional Achievements in the Cricketing Sphere have extended to almost all possible vital avenues of the game reaching often the professional levels – as a Player, Umpire, Scorer, Training Instructor and Examiner on its laws, Administrator, Writer, Author and, even an Activist promoting 'Accessible Facilities for All' at Cricket Stadia, etc.

went on to serve three driving organizations in the Drug field viz Glaxo, Mack Woods Winthrop, and Hemas, while chasing after at the same time his recreation time energy, to turn into a Cricket Test Umpire, the main SriLankan to qualify as such with the Worldwide Cricket Board in 1992. Tragically while serving at Hemas that year as head of Value Confirmation and Item The board, he was remorselessly struck somewhere near a misfortune that cut off his spine surrendered to limit him to a wheel seat until the end of his life Where many would have surrender to a destiny with the breaking of their fantasies.

Ajith would not surrender and from that wheel seat upheld by his caring mother, close family and dear companions faced life's conflict boldly, composing books on Cricket and all the more critically advocating the reason for the contrastingly abled as himself. He established IDIRIYA a non-profit philanthropic association to look for regulations to disclose it required for all structures to have access to the distinctively abled and surprisingly tied down a High Court judgment to help his objective. His death left a serious void and to guarantee that his memory is propagated in a significant manner a Wellbeing Treatment unit in his name will be pronounced opened by his sister Deepthi Guneratne in Sri Ramakrishna Beragala Haldumulla Sri Lanka on his 72nd birth commemoration, on 24th February 2024. The unit will be named the Ajith CS Perera Wellbeing Treatment Unit and is neighbouring a consideration home for truly and intellectually impeded dejected elderly folks shown to Fabulous Grins Establishment and will support the occupants as well as preparation in Seniors Care. The drawn-out vision to make it middle for Telemedicine administrations in the unit was made conceivable by a consortium containing Mr. R Gnanasekaran Chairman of Two Leaves Trust, Ret. Colonel Manik Jayakumar -S L V F Founder Q Trade, Godwin Devendranath Marino Project Coordinator of Two Leaves Trust, of Fantastic Grins Establishment, S. Skandakumar Our Paanai Trust, /Somasakthy Trust Chairman of both trust, Deepthi and Ranil Guneratne addressing the Legal administrators of Idiriya, Sean Nathan and Dr and Mrs Dil Seneviratne.

Perera started playing serious cricket, as a utility player who combined his undergraduate and postgraduate education with cricket. He represented regularly the University of Colombo for seven consecutive years between 1972 and 1978, and played at Inter-club Division – One two-day tournament cricket conducted by the Board of Control for Cricket in Sri Lanka (BCCSL) for the P. Saravanamuttu Trophy, which was then considered as the main first-class domestic cricket competition in the country.

In 1975, whilst still an undergraduate, Perera qualified to become a Cricket Umpire. He is the First and Only test-match-panel Cricket Umpire the Royal College Colombo and the University of Colombo have ever produced.

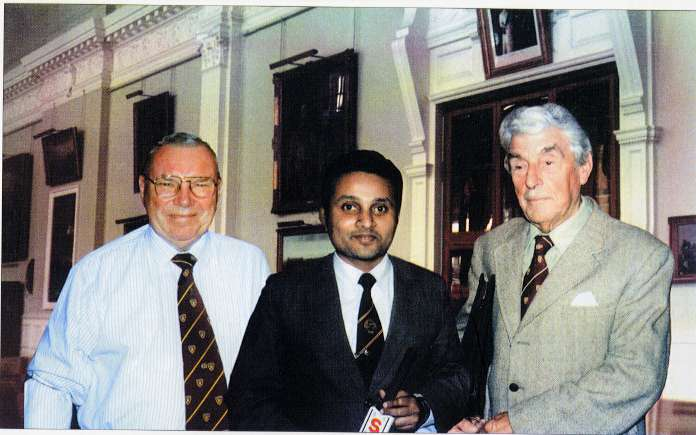
Becoming a professionally qualified cricket umpire. Perera in the Long Room at Lord's, London, in 1985. With him are David Whiley (left) and Tom Smith MBE (right), then the two senior examiners of the Association of cricket umpires England.

Sri Lanka gained test status in 1981 as a full member of the international cricket council. Yet, it was still the era when cricket scoring was hardly given any kind of importance.

In the Preface to The Golden Era of Sri Lankan Cricket Leslie Cheeseman B.E.M. described Perera's endeavours as:

"Even in those early days, the perceived extent of his unbridled enthusiasm, the level of his intended personal commitment, analytical mind, high degree of technical knowledge of the game and its governing laws, plus his unquenchable thirst for newer knowledge and practical experience at higher level of the game together with his willingness to further improve individual performance, made Perera to decide to go to England, several times at his own expense, to achieve this goal".

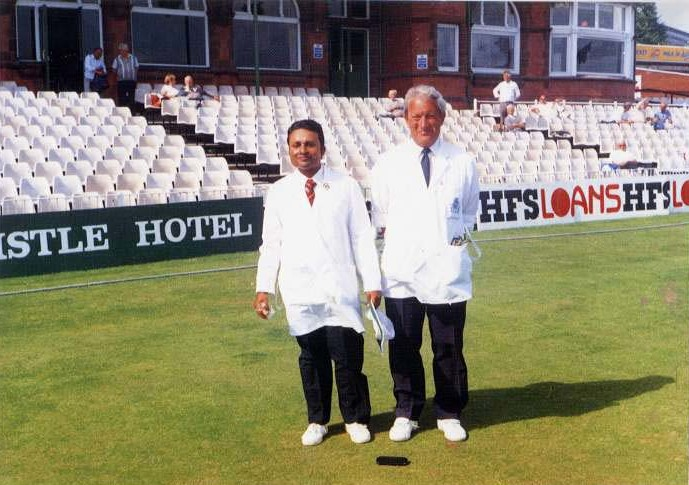
Professional umpiring. Perera with Don Oslear, former test and first class cricket umpire; Lancashire vs Somerset county seconds 4-day championship match at the Old Trafford Manchester in July 1990.

As a result, Perera became the FIRST Sri Lankan to be accepted and recognised by the international body the Association of Cricket Umpires and Scorers England as a "Professionally Qualified" Cricket Umpire (24 October 1985), Scorer (7 April 1987), then also as a 'Scorer competent in advanced scoring techniques' (25 March 1990), a Grade – A Senior Training Instructor in the art and craft of both Cricket Scoring and Cricket Umpiring (August 1990) and finally, also as an effective Examiner (1 November 1998) on the Laws of Cricket, all offices of this reputed Association.

For 15 weeks of the British summer in 1990, Perera, afforded the opportunity, umpired cricket matches in England in Lancashire County four-day Second Eleven and in top Leagues in the area, viz. Bolton & District Cricket Association, Bolton League and Central Lancashire.

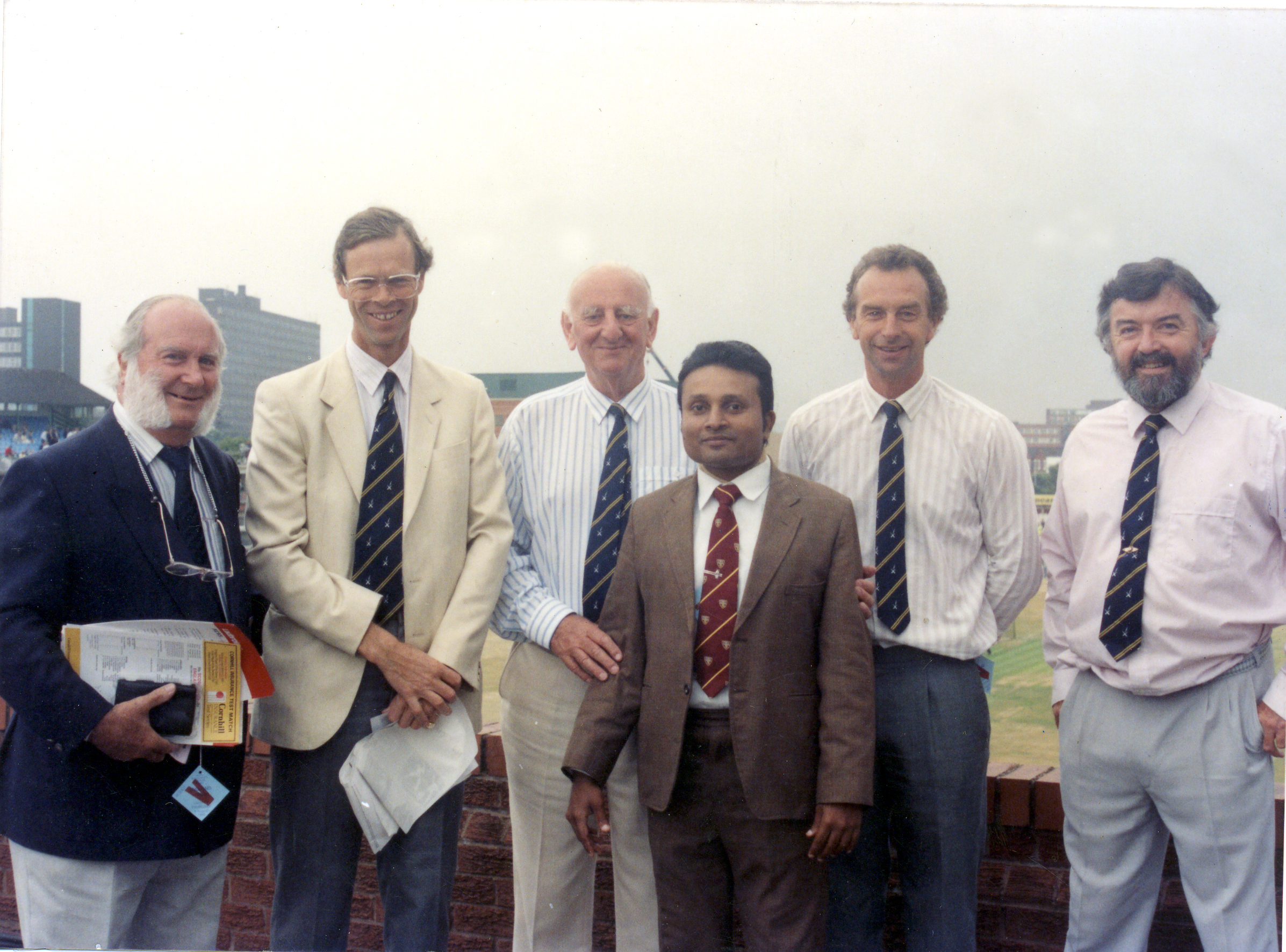
Invited to the BBC cricket commentary box. Perera with the BBC radio test match special commentary team at Old Trafford in England on 9 August 1990 during the second test match England vs India. With him are (on his left) Godfrey Evans, Christopher Martin-Jenkins, Brian Johnston (and on his right) David Lloyd and Bill Frindall (Scorer).

After 17 years of hard work, sacrifice, loads of patience and, refusal to bow down to pressure and change his ways to please anyone at the centre, Perera, at the age of 36, made his way to the Six-member Sri Lanka Test-Match-Panel of Cricket Umpires on 10 November 1992.

In 10 days' time Perera was due – formerly appointed by the Board of Control for Cricket in Sri Lanka – to stand in his first test match in Colombo Sri Lanka vs New Zealand. It was so..... very close, yet so... far for Perera.

=== Significant Contributions ===
In 1996, he was highly commended by the then Sri Lanka Cricket Board in becoming of great assistance to them, as single-handedly, Perera accepted and satisfactorily completed its highly technical assignment to streamline the rules and regulations governing 2, 3 and 4-day Division – 1, Division – 2 and under 24 Major Tournament Cricket in Sri Lanka.

Seated on a Wheelchair, battling paraplegia and balancing a laptop, he even Authored Two A – 4 size Internationally famed books on Cricket, The Golden Era of Sri Lankan Cricket (May 1999) ISBN 955-96698-0-X and Thinking Cricket (September 2001) ISBN 955-96698-1-8. They were also Published by him without any external financial support.

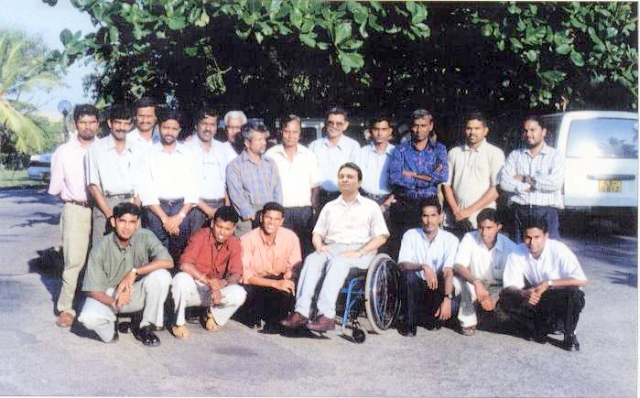
First formal cricket scorer training in Sri Lanka. Perera with the senior scorers of Sri Lanka at this programme held at Taj Samudra hotel in Colombo in December 1999.

In December 1999, at the request of the Sri Lanka Cricket Board, Perera designed and conducted over four half-days the FIRST Formal Training and Evaluation Programme for the top Sri Lanka Cricket Scorers, in preparation for the under-19 Cricket World Cup Tournament that was held in Sri Lanka in January 2000.

Perera has also turned a pioneer dis-Ability Activist campaigning in Sri Lanka for Accessible built Sports Environments for Al and user-friendly Facilities.

=== Honours and Recognitions ===
On 8 May 1999 the Association of Cricket Umpires Sri Lanka, in recognition of his twenty four long years of dedicated services, unstinting loyal support and unlimited contributions towards the betterment of the umpiring fraternity in Sri Lanka, at times at great personal sacrifice, unanimously elected Perera a 'Life Member'.

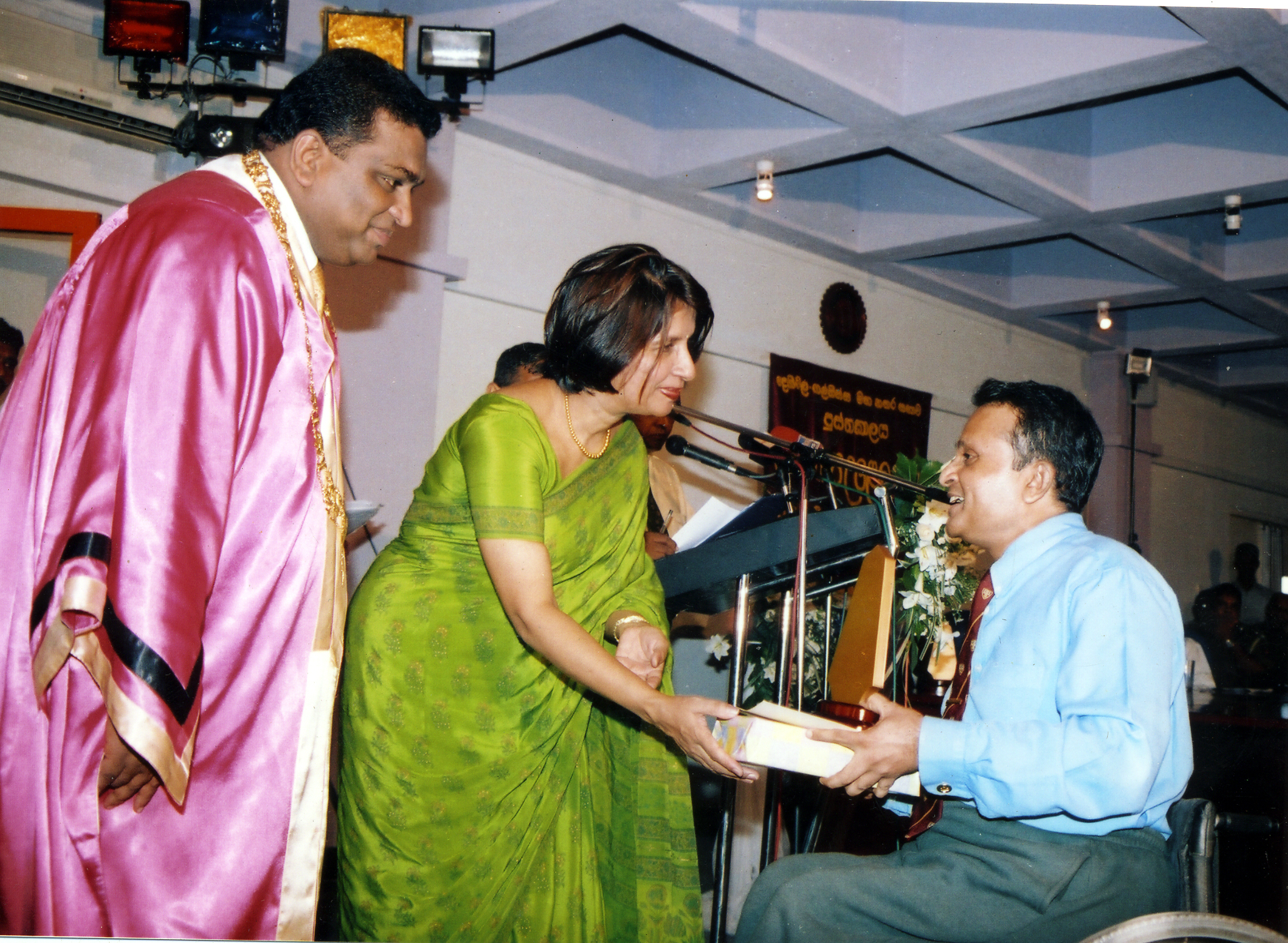
A historic achievement. Perera receives the award from the then high commissioner for India in Sri Lanka, Her Excellency Nirupama Rao, watched by the Hon. Mayor Danasiri Amaratunga, at the literary awards festival 2005 organised by the Dehiwala Municipal Council at its auditorium on 30 September 2005.

Wisden Cricketers' Almanack (millennium edition) has seen fit to regard Perera as one of only eight Cricketing People of the World to be specifically recognised for his many outstanding achievements and worthwhile significant contributions to the game.

He also became a recipient (1999) of the Star of Asia award for Excellence in Sports.

On 30 January 2003, Perera and 15 other Retired Test Match and One-day International Panel Senior Cricket Umpires of Sri Lanka were recognised for the dedicated long years of Thankless Services rendered to the game and felicitated.

On 30 September 2005, Perera, for his Internationally Recognised Significant Contributions to Cricket Literature, became the First Author in the annals of his Country's (Sri Lanka) Sports Literature to be recognised and honoured formally at a literary awards festival.

On 30 August 2007 again, Perera was amongst Five Cricket Scorers recognised and honoured befittingly for the untiring and admirable services rendered to this vital aspect of the game.

== disability Activist: 1997 – ==
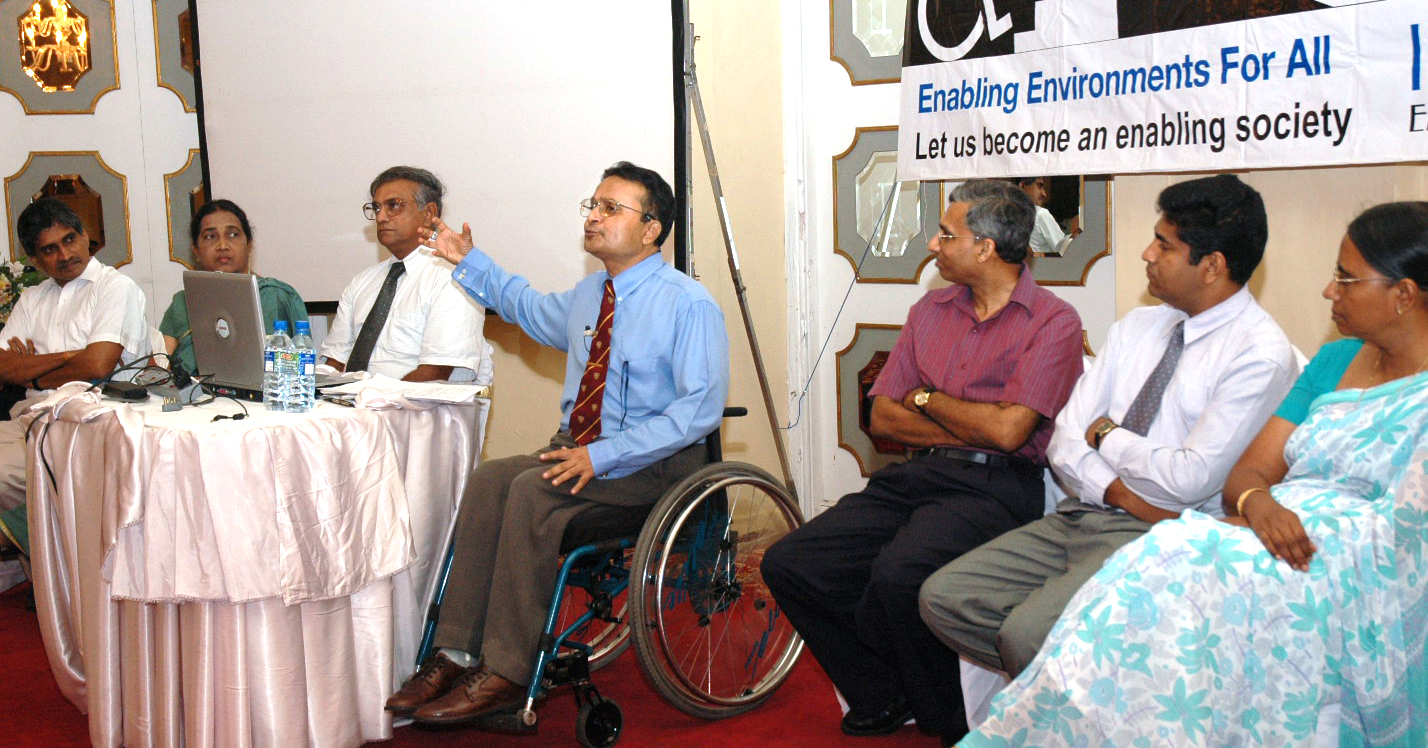
Perera leads a panel discussion offering numerous insights on 'Accessibility to Built Environments' at Taj Samudra Hotel in Colombo in July 2006.

Perera is the pioneer campaigner in Sri Lanka for Social Inclusion focusing equal opportunity, justice and dignity for People of ALL Abilities in day-to-day life – the key concept in this context being universal design for inclusion of people.- (meaning construction of environments that enable by design so as to include all and exclude none.)

=== Significant Contributions ===
As a dis-Ability rights activist, Perera has promoted the concept of establishing a society that does not marginalise or discriminate against people on the basis of limited mobility, either for short time, or long time or life time in attending to normal day-to-day life – the principal problem in this context.

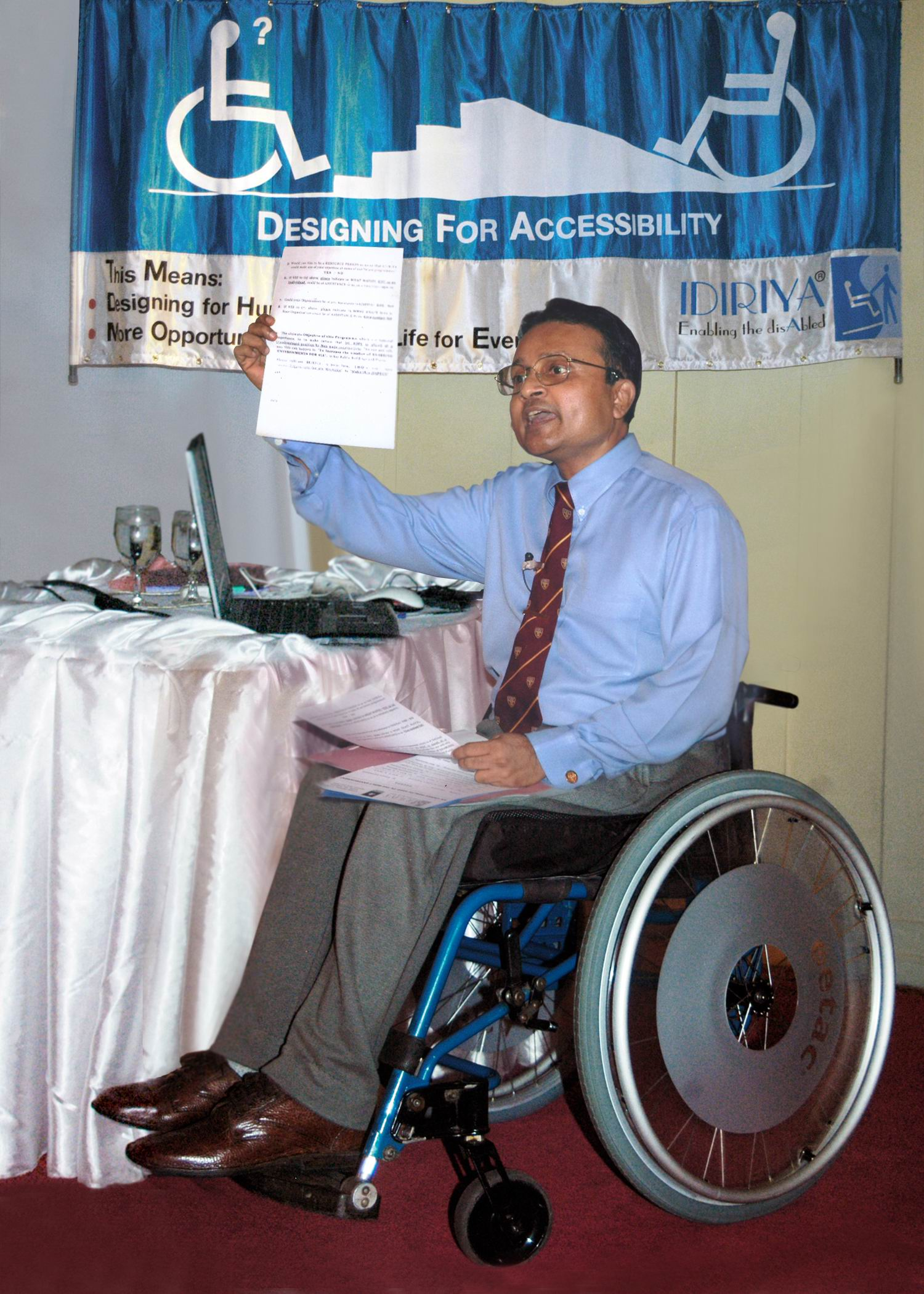
"Ability within dis-Ability". Perera the writer, speaker and presenter at Taj Samudra Hotel in Colombo on 15 March 2006.

He is a fervent advocate of built environments and facilities that are a joy rather than a trial to use by everyone. He has constantly used the weapon of persuasion to convince people that the cumulative result of even small changes could be substantial.

Perera has also pioneered the campaign in Sri Lanka for accessible tourism, recognising it as an overlooked growth market and new profit resource for Sri Lanka.

Perera was also instrumental in proposing to the Sri Lanka Standards Institution (SLSI) and paving the way in persuading them to establish the first Sri Lanka standard for design in building construction SLS ISO TR 9527:2006 in 2007, a fact which Dr. A. R. L. Wijesekera, the then Chairman SLSI, recognised as an achievement of national importance.

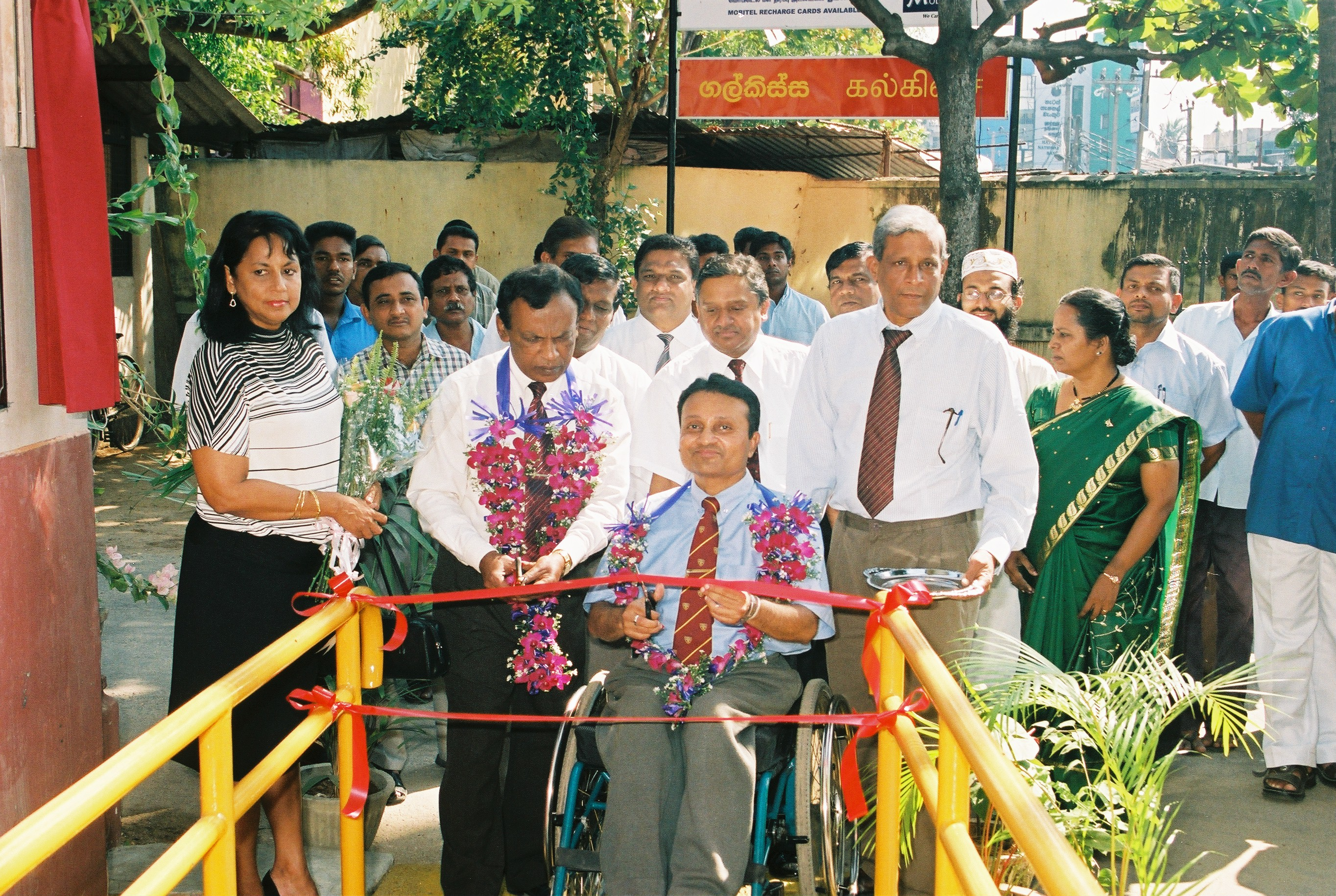
Accessibility at the First Post Office in Sri Lanka. Perera, with the then Deputy Postmaster-General Kingsley Wimalaratne, cuts the ribbon to open the accessible pathway at Mount Lavinia Post Office on 24 January 2007. Perera is watched by (on left) Marise Deckker Chairperson Astron Ltd. Ratmalana (funder).

=== Major Achievements ===
Perera successfully pursue single handed a fundamental rights application.

Perera, appearing at all times in person on a wheelchair and seeking redress for physically disabled persons accessing new public buildings, successfully pursued single handed a public interest litigation fundamental rights application under reference SCFR 221/2009.

He argued the need to have the disability access laws and regulations already enacted some years ago, fully enforced and implemented from this date, so that, ALL Key Building Parts of NEW public buildings in Sri Lanka – toilets and wash facilities in particular – in the commercial, recreational, social, educational, residential and industrial categories, shall be constructed in accordance with standards and design requirements specified in the regulations.

His endeavours were aimed at minimising safety hazards for everyone, preventing further colossal losses the people and country incur, promoting social inclusion for all and enhancing productive and gainful opportunities for the widest possible range of persons, disabled people in particular, in their day-to-day lives.

Perera gets a fillip for accessibility rights

Thanks to the commitment and voluntary efforts of Perera with foresight, the inherent right of disabled people to have unhindered access to public buildings and facilities received a substantial boost when the Supreme Court of Sri Lanka gave a landmark order on 27 April 2011, further strengthening the earlier given order of 14 October 2009.

The Supreme Court order, Perera ensured, further stated that all authorities empowered to approve building plans or issue 'Certificates of Conformity' for public buildings shall refrain from doing so in respect of any new buildings which violated these orders.

Building planners, architects, builders and local authorities together with owners and co-owners, as equally responsible partners, will be required to adhere to the legal requirements in regard to accessibility. Any violations of these court orders shall be a serious punishable offence incurring punitive repercussions.

Perera for the petitioner present again in person saw the Supreme Court of Sri Lanka order on 17 June 2013 the Agencies of the State to ensure that those of them who are disabled or with restricted ability be given every opportunity to integrate freely with the community.

At the Presidential Elections held on 26 January 2010, Perera, in consultation with the Commissioner of Elections initiated voluntary action towards enabling the staff on duty at polling stations to be sensitive to the special needs of disabled voters, including those with significant physical, manual and visual impairments and worked towards providing polling stations and polling booths that would be more approachable and accessible to the disabled persons.

For the first time in Sri Lanka history, with endeavors to make hear their voices in the Parliament, Perera led a group of professionals and intellectuals with restricted ability to contest the Parliamentary Elections of 17 August 2015.

Perera's untiring efforts to arrest a National disaster

Then again in October 2018, Perera stated:

Despite 13 years elapsing since a comprehensive set of Access Regulations were made and passed unanimously in Parliament AND reinforced by an Order given under SCFR 221/2009 to over 70 respondents by the Supreme Court on 27 April 2011 AND Sri Lanka on 8 February 2016 ratifying the legally binding agreement of UN Convention for the Protection of the Rights of the disabled, STILL, there is large scale and substantial non-compliance of NEW constructions with and non-enforcement of Accessibility Regulations.

Perera fights to arrest destructive marginalisation.

Perera as his moral duty argued for the need to oppose any actions causing further delays of meaningful implementation of this earlier order given by the Supreme Court and thereby to arrest soonest this national disaster and hence successfully pursued again single-handedly a Nationally and Internationally important Public Interest Fundamental Rights second Application No: SCFR 273 / 2018.

Successful persuasion to minimize tormenting consequences.

His renewed endeavours were aimed here at minimising tormenting consequences continually STILL faced by, not less than an estimated 20% of Sri Lanka's population – i.e. 4 Million People – experiencing impediments to their physical mobility, stability, dexterity and / or eyesight – in accessing and using in daily life even the NEW constructions.

These include potential threat to their safety, marginalisation beyond expectations and unwanted dependency on others and thereby potentially CRIPPLING precious human life economically, socially and mentally – remain the most vulnerable, voiceless yet the country's largest minority group.

Supreme Court again in landmark judgement.

Perera saw the Supreme Court of Sri Lanka, after hearing submissions and arguments, in a 28-page long LANDMARK judgement given on 18 April 2019, clearly stated:

"The stark truth is: Meaningful implementation of these Accessibility Laws by the State and the Private Sector is a continual failure and thereby, beyond doubt, even at numerous NEWLY built environments, there is destructive marginalisation".

"It has caused continual violation of the Fundamental Rights guaranteed by Article 12(1) and Article 14(1)(h) of the Sri Lanka Constitution, to the Petitioner, Dr. Perera and thereby denial of opportunity of equality for SAFE access and their use in daily life by the Country's largest minority – others similarly circumstanced with restricted ability / mobility".

=== Honours and Recognitions ===
As depicted in the five photographs below, Dr. Perera perhaps became the first disabled person in Sri Lanka to be recognised in Sri Lanka for his outstanding voluntary contributions to the community – to the promotion and establishment of 'Accessibility to the Built environment', enhancing safety and social inclusion with empowerment of people with all abilities.

Perera has aggressively promoted in Sri Lanka the concept of 'Social Inclusion for All' with the Vision: Accessible Sri Lanka focusing on built environments that does not marginalise or cause discrimination against people on the grounds of inevitable diversity in ability and campaigned against arbitrary categorisation of people.

Undeterred by his personal adversity, playing eight different roles over 17 consecutive years for the promotion of Accessibility Rights in Sri Lanka, he was recognised and appreciated in 2016 for his outstanding voluntary contributions to the community – please see below.

First, in September 2016, he was named the "Sri Lankan of the Year 2016" under the category of Unsung Hero; and then on the UN Day in October 2016 he was presented with the APEX award by the United Nations Association of Sri Lanka.

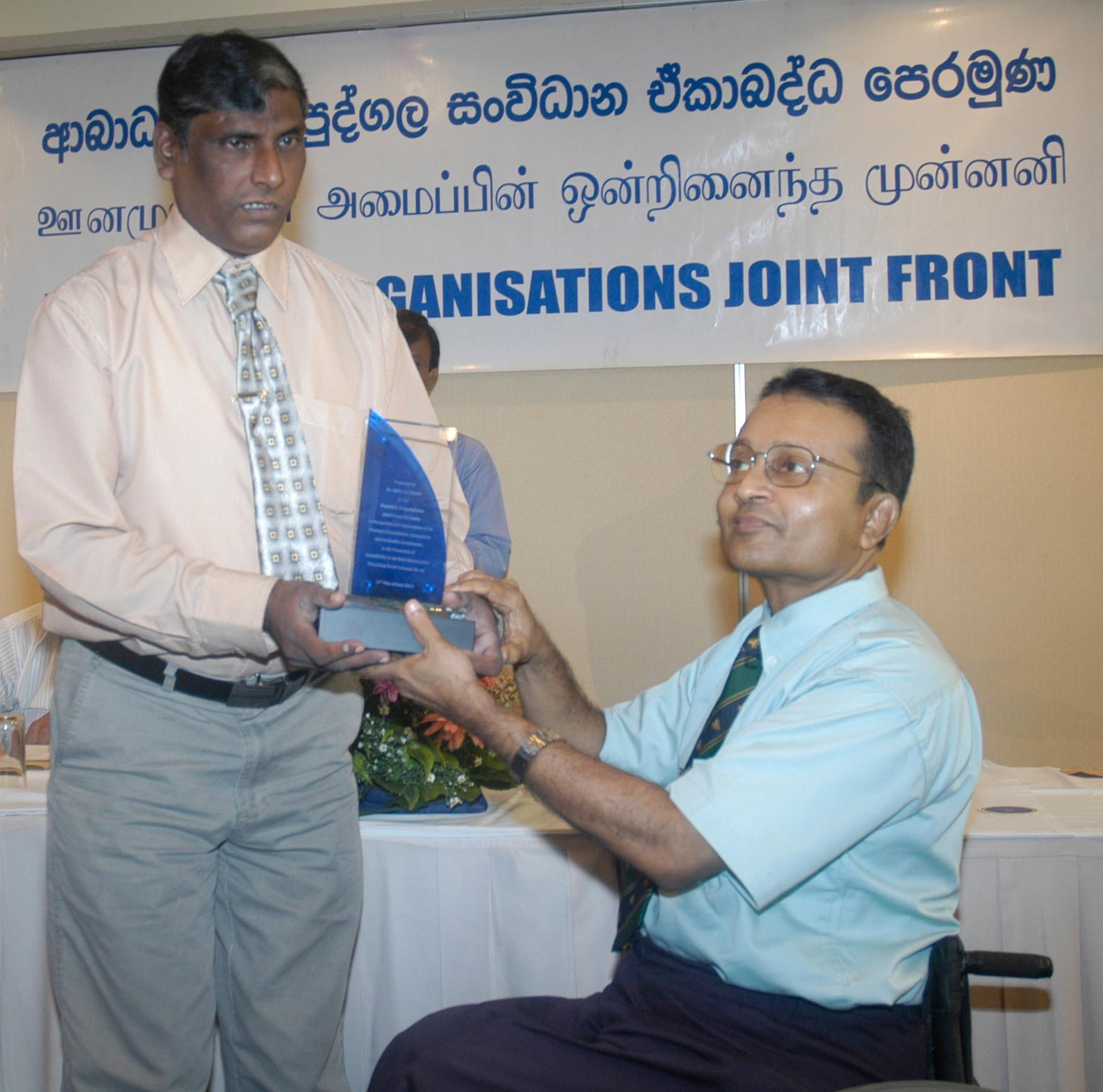
Felicitation – The Disability Organisations Joint Front Sri Lanka (DOJF) presented Perera with a special plaque at a felicitation ceremony held at Hotel Renuka Colombo on Saturday 11 June 2010, in appreciation of his outstanding contributions promoting Social Inclusion for All.

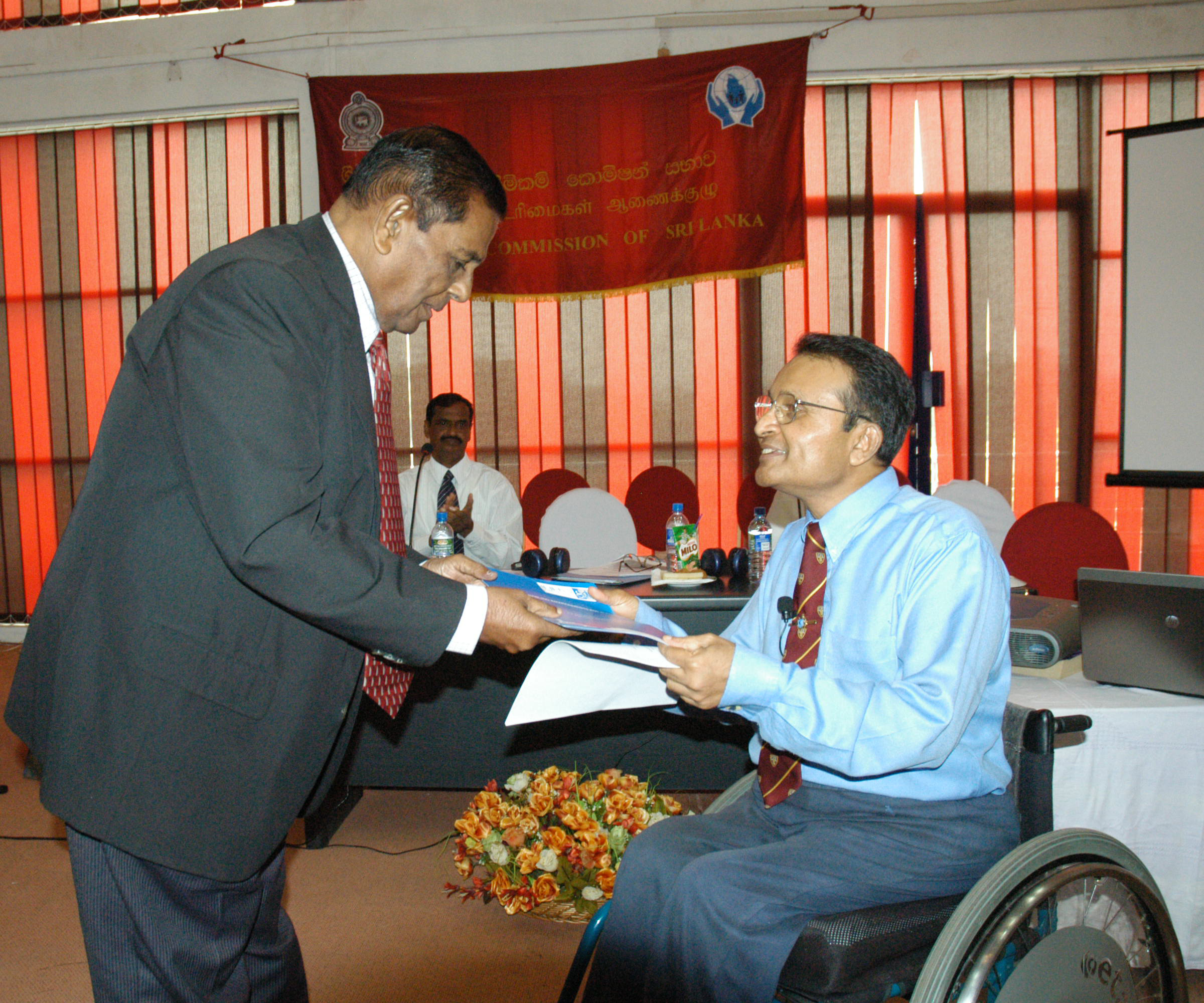
Appreciation – Chairman Human Rights Commission of Sri Lanka former SC Judge Justice Priyantha Perera expressed HRCSL's gratitude and sincere thanks to Dr Perera for his invaluable contributions and for the invitation extended by him to the HRCSL to initiate necessary action to safeguard rights of People with dis-Abilities.

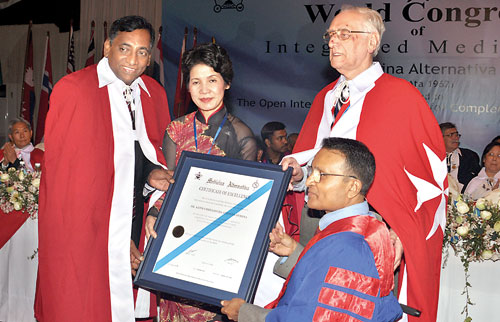
Recognition – A humanitarian award presented to Dr. Perera in November 2011 by Professor Dr. Dame Nguyen Theresa, International Vice Chancellor of OIUCM, Victoria Australia; Professor Dr. Sir John Hopson – Grand Master of the Knights of Charity, England; and Professor Dr. Sir Mayisvren Ellappen – Dean, Faculty of Complementary Medicines, Allianze University College of Medical Sciences, Malaysia.

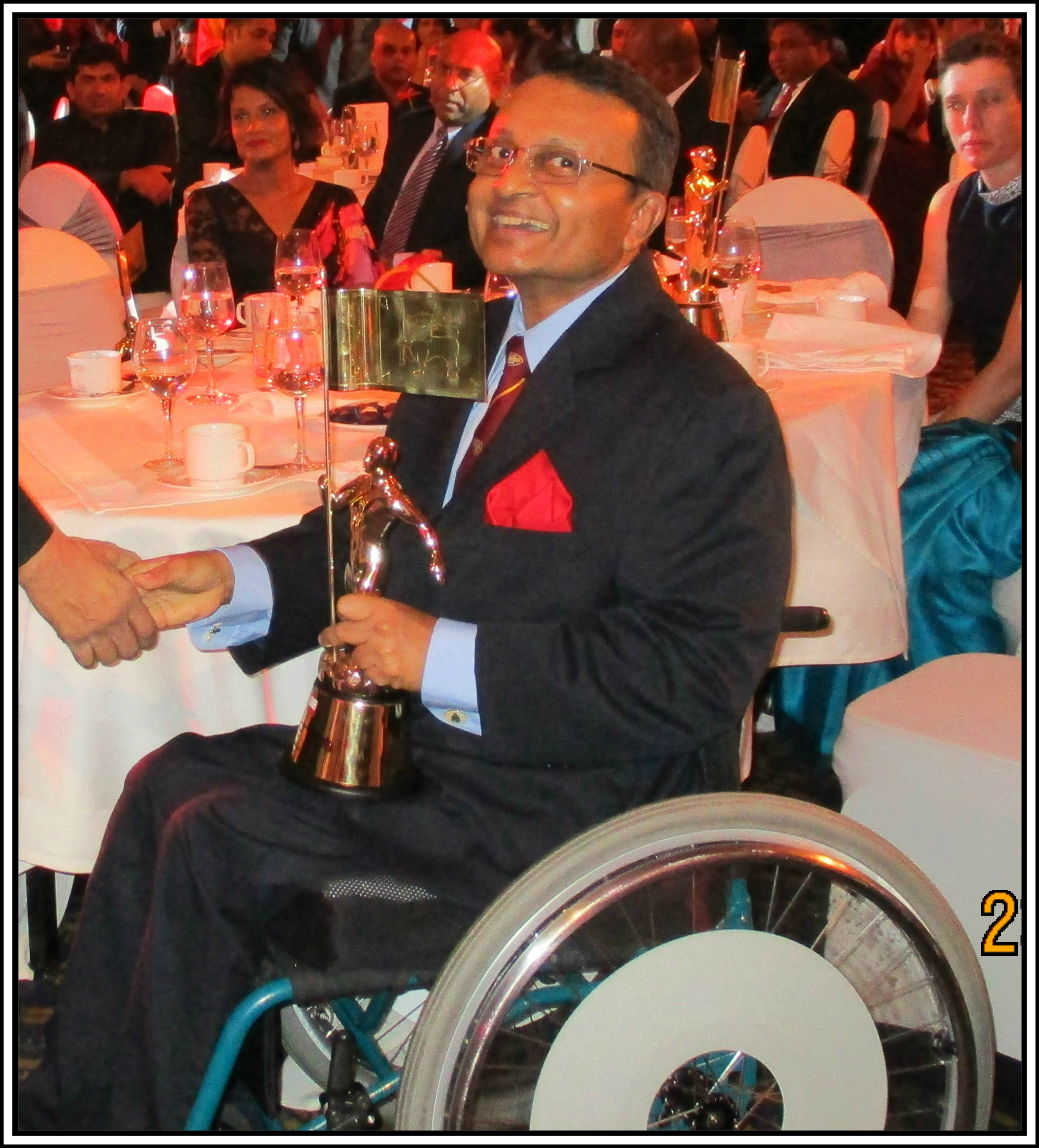
Unsung Hero – Sri Lankan of the Year 2016 – Perhaps it was the first time ever in Sri Lanka that a person with a disability and reliant on a wheelchair was befittingly recognised for his ability within disability.

== Books ==
=== The Golden Era of Sri Lankan Cricket ===
(1999 April); ISBN 955-96698-0-X

It's an impressive memento which described the fascinating story of how his national team – Sri Lanka – blossomed out and established itself as International Champions of 1996/97 in Overs-limited cricket. Perera has also captured here the brilliance, the philosophy and the pulsating drama of one-day internationals (ODIs) of that glorious period (1996–98) backed by highly informative and well tabulated appendices.

Further Reading

- Sri Lanka were the Kings amongst Kings (1996–99) Retrieved on 27 February 2009
- Another masterpiece by Ajith Perera Retrieved on 27 February 2009

=== Thinking Cricket ===
(2001 September); ISBN 955-96698-1-8 Magnum opus

Perera's Magnum opus never loses sight of what is required to make a complete cricketer – in every sense of the word. Former England skipper Mike Brearley OBE has contributed the preface while the then Sri Lanka's cricket coach, Davenall Whatmore, the foreword. It is the only self study training guide by an umpire for the players. It has won admiration and gained much recognition to the country from the cricketing world, which includes the ICC, MCC, ECB and even the prestigious Wisden Cricketers' Almanack (2002).

Further Reading

- Thinking Cricket (February 2004) Retrieved on 12 March 2009
- This is no ordinary cricket book but a well-thought out book of instructions. By Mahinda Wijesinghe (2001 November) Retrieved on 12 March 2009

=== Access Ability for All – Why You? ===
(2008 May); ISBN 978-955-1914-00-4

It is an A-5 size consciousness-raising mind opener, free of technical jargon, on Accessibility for All to built environments to convince decision makers that it is a low cost investment and a Win – Win game of indispensable National importance for everyone.

=== Teacher to the Navy – Instructor Commodore M. G. S. Perera ===
(2017 June) – Second (Revised) Edition; ISBN 978-955-9339-08-3

This book is a tribute to Perera's father, who served Sri Lanka's Navy in its formative years (1950–1975) and founded the Naval and Maritime Academy (NMA) at Dockyard Trincomalee on 18 July 1967, serving as its first commandant. See under External links and the first Director Naval Training Sri Lanka Navy
