= Indian Federation of United Nations Associations =

Organization

- Abbreviation: IFUNA
- Formation: 1962
- Headquarters: New Delhi, India
- Head: MRS. BIJOYA CHAKRABORTY; PRESIDENT
- Parent organization: NONE
- Website: www.ifuna.org

The Indian Federation of United Nations Associations is the leading independent policy authority on the United Nations in India and an India-wide grassroots membership organisation.

Indian Federation of United Nations Associations ( IFUNA ) was established more than six decades ago. Indian Federation of United Nations Associations is affiliated with the World Federation of United Nations Associations (WFUNA). IFUNA is the only body to represent India in the U.N. Forums. The 1st President of IFUNA was Late Smt. Vijaya Laxmi Pandit who represented India as President of the General Assembly of United Nations. A Galaxy of Luminaries had adorned the office of President of IFUNA.

== UNA members ==
IFUNA has a network of affiliated State United Nations Associations in various states of the country such as Andhra Pradesh, Assam, Bihar, Chandigarh, Chhattisgarh, Gujarat. Haryana, Himachal Pradesh, Kerala, Karnataka, Madhya Pradesh, Maharashtra, Manipur, Meghalaya, Orissa, Rajasthan, Tamil Nadu, Uttar Pradesh and West Bengal.

== See also ==
- United Nations
- United Nations Association
- World Federation of United Nations Associations
- League of Nations Union
