= United Nations Youth Associations =

Youth-led NGO's supporting the principles of the United Nations Charter

United Nations Youth Associations (UNYAs) are youth-led NGO's entirely consisting of young volunteers. These associations are supporting the goals and principles of the United Nations Charter and it is their aim to promote these principles and the work of the United Nations among their national civil society.

In August 2011, the United Nations Youth Associations Network (UNYANET) was founded in Vienna. UNYANET is the international network for United Nations Youth Associations and UNA-Youth Sections.

If a country doesn’t have an UNYA, youth can get involved with their local United Nations Association (UNA). If someone does not know if their country has a UNA, contact the World Federation of United Nations Associations (WFUNA) Youth Network.

WFUNA is a global nongovernmental nonprofit membership organization of UNAs in over 100 countries. The WFUNA Youth Network is a network of UN Youth Associations and UNA youth sections/youth wings from all around the world.

== UNYA Activities ==
UNYAs conduct a variety of activities, some of which are:

- Model United Nations, a simulation of a UN meeting for high school students
- Education programmes for primary and secondary school students to inform them about the work of the United Nations
- Speakers events and panel discussions
- UN Youth Delegate programmes

== Different organizational forms for UNYAs ==
=== UNYA/UNSA/UNYSA ===
Young people might set up an independent organization – a United Nations Youth (or Students) Association – that works independently, but often in cooperation with their country’s United Nations Association (UNA). In these cases, the relationship between the UNYA and the UNA takes various forms ranging from the UNYA and the UNA being independent organizations that coordinate on an ad hoc basis to the UNYA having a seat in the UNAs board. There are also United Nations Associations that do not have "Youth" in their title but that are almost entirely composed and governed by youth.

=== UNA-Youth Sections ===
Often, there are Youth Sections within the UNA acting as a youth organization but within the UNAs structure.
