= United Nations Youth and Students Association of Austria =

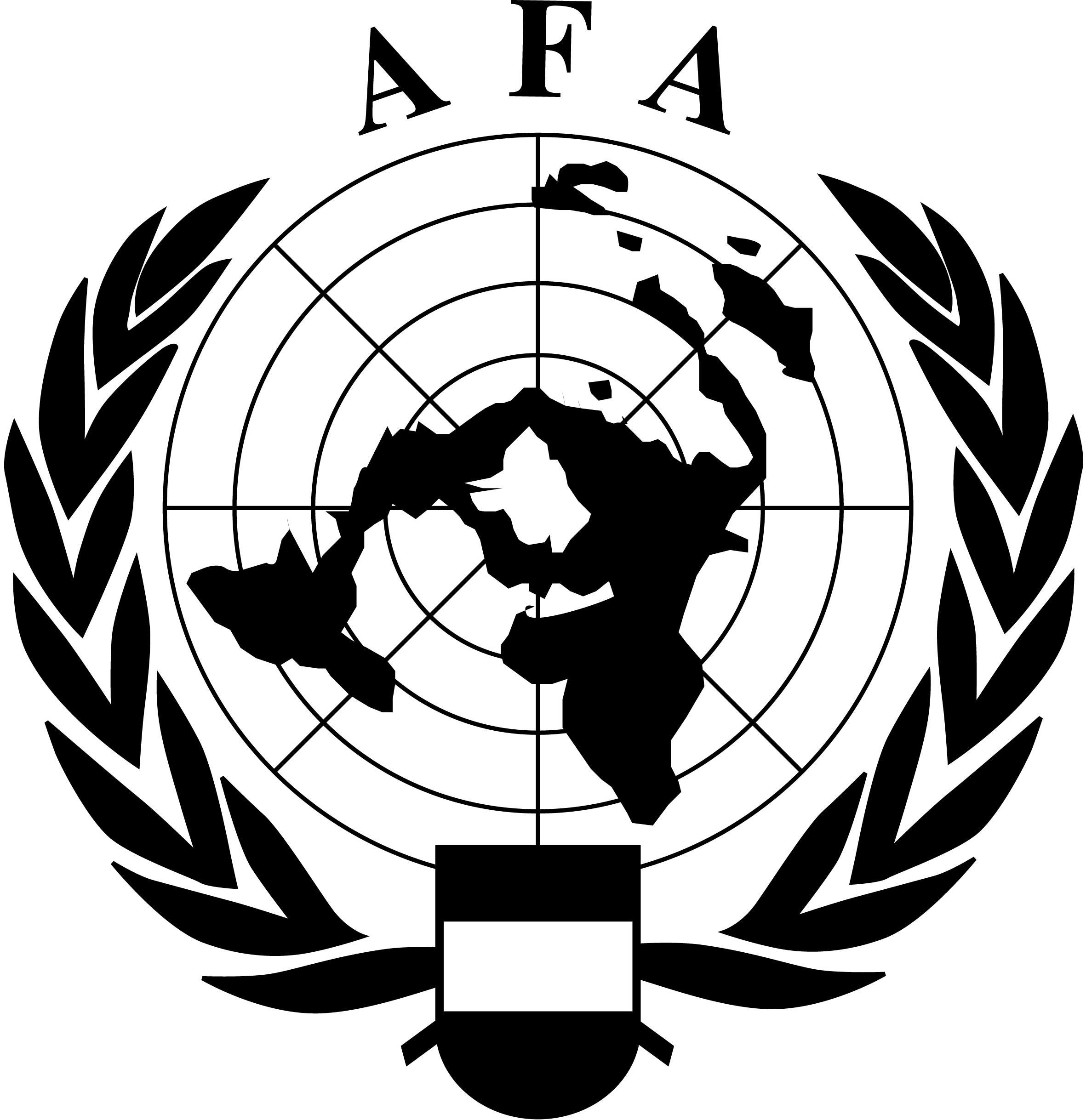
Logo
Basic Data
Founded:	22. Jänner 1991
Founded in:	Vienna
President:	Michael F. Pfeifer
Vice-President:	vacant
Members:	approx. 32700 (as of: January 2023)
Website:	www.afa.at

The Academic Forum for Foreign Affairs (AFA) was founded on January 22, 1991, and is the Austrian non-partisan network for young people interested in international issues. AFA is founding member of the United Nations Youth Associations Network (UNYANET).

AFA has about 32700 members in Austria and all over the world. Membership is open to anyone interested below the age of 30. All activities of AFA are organized by active members on a voluntary basis. The range of activities are lectures, discussions, trainings, debates and Model United Nations, all about international relations, foreign policy or about the United Nations.

Prominent former active members of AFA or its predecessor the "Academic Union for Foreign Affairs" (AVA) are e.g. Ewald Nowotny.

== VIMUN ==
The biggest and most prestigious event organized by AFA was the Vienna International Model United Nations (VIMUN) during the years 1995 and 2019. This international UN simulation conference was at that time the only one of its kind in Austria. Although with up to 250 participants from around 40 different nations VIMUN was not one of the largest Model United Nations worldwide, it was the only one where the entire conference was taking place at offices of the UN. At the conference, various UN committees such as the Security Council, the Human Rights Council (HRC), the United Nations Office on Drugs and Crime (UNODC), the United Nations Industrial Development Organization (UNIDO), or the International Atomic Energy Agency (IAEA) were simulated very authentically, using the actual rules of procedure of the UN. Each participant represented one country with the aim of asserting its national interests in the committee. Besides extensive negotiations over the period of four days, different social programs were offered every day. Social programs may vary from a dinner at a typical Austrian “Heurigen”, a reception at the city hall of Vienna hosted by the mayor of Vienna or a clubbing at a fashionable disco in Vienna.

== Global View ==
The Global View Magazine was a project, published by AFA and was a discussion platform for everyone interested in international relations, foreign policy and the United Nations. It was published four times a year and contains articles in German and English language, written by experts as well as by young graduates and students.

== Special Projects of AFA ==
=== Debattierclub (DC) ===
In 2004 AFA held its first debate club, one of the earliest in Austria. Since then debate clubs have been founded in several Austrian cities, and the AFA Debattierclub in Vienna was one of the two largest in the country (together with Debattierklub Wien.) 2012 it hosted the German Debating Championships.
