= United Nations Association of Slovenia =

- Formation: 1951
- Headquarters: Cankarjeva 1/II, 1000 Ljubljana, Slovenia
- President: Prof. Dr. Bojko Bucar

The United Nations Association of Slovenia (UNA Slovenia) was established in 1951, supporting the United Nations in its role as a keeper of global peace and stability. Following the Slovene Declaration of independence on 25 June 1991, Slovenia was accepted as the 176th member state of the UN. Soon thereafter, on 6 November 1992, UNA Slovenia was accepted into the circle of United Nations Associations as a member of World Federation of United Nations Associations.

== Functions ==
The main objective of UNA Slovenia, which was formulated in 1951, is to inform the public about the ideas, goals and activities of the UN.

The association is gathering and providing information on the role and activities of the UN. They maintain a library with informative and specialized publications by the UN and its agencies, as well as other publications on various other subjects.

To keep the public informed about issues surrounding the UN the association cooperates with the United Nations Information Service Vienna (UNIS Vienna).

In cooperation with the Institute of International Law and International Relations at the Faculty of Law of the University of Ljubljana, the association gathers, translates and makes available various international documents, books and other publications on the subject of UN and international relations.

Various issues on the UN agenda are also addressed on regular lectures and panels. Those lectures used to be an important part in the education of university students. The association also carries out an educational programme for primary schools pupils with the aim to introduce the goals and activities of the UN to the youngest.

UNA Slovenia every year on UN Day awards prizes to graduate and post-graduate students for ten best dissertations on UN topics, with the aim for furthering research work on the UN.

Another event is the celebration on Human Rights Day, when the association also awards prizes, here for essays, photographs and drawings made by primary and secondary school pupils on the issue of human rights.

Excursions to various UN institutions have the aim to make everyone interested acquainted with the actual work of the UN agencies.

Most of the work is done by volunteers, who are mostly law school and international relations students, who represent an informal Youth section within the organization.
