= United Nations Association of Turkey =

United Nations Association of Turkey
Status	Non governmental organization
Founded	June 25, 1946
Office	Ankara
President	Rahmi Kumaş

United Nations Association of Turkey (Birleşmiş Milletler Türk Derneği in Turkish) was established in 1946 by the following founding members;
1) Prof. Cemil Bilsel, Member of Parliament (MP);
2) Prof. Sukru Esmer, MP;
3) Hazım Atıf Kuyucak, MP;
4) Sinasi Devrim, MP;
5)Abdulhak Sinasi Hisar, Advisor to the Ministry of Foreign Affairs.

The association was accorded the status of 'Non-profit organization' by the decree of the Council of Ministers of Republic of Turkey on April 16, 1979. The aim of the association is to spread the ideals and the objectives of the United Nations (UN) among people, to endeavour to materialize the principles of the UN. By establishing contacts with fellow societies in friendly countries as well as with the World Federation of United Nations Associations (WFUNA), it seeks to invalidate assertions contrary to the main principles of the UN.

== United Nations Association of Turkey Youth Section ==
United Nations Association of Turkey Youth Section is the organization's youth network.

United Nations Association of Turkey Youth Section conduces to endeavor for materializing the principles of United Nations and to development/strengthening of youth activities by raising awareness on specific issues.

Youth Section of United Nations Association of Turkey was founded in February 2007. In 2011, UNA-Turkey Youth Section has become a founding member of the United Nations Youth Associations Network (UNYANET), the international network for United Nations Youth Associations and UNA-Youth Sections.
