= Anatoly Torkunov =

Soviet/Russian diplomat and scholar

- Анатолий Торкунов
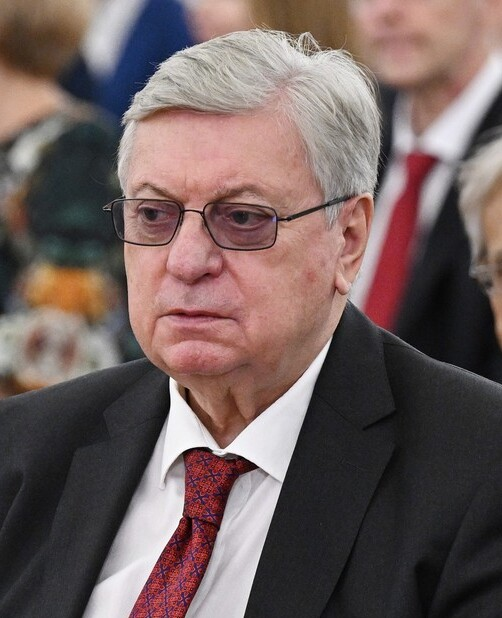
- Torkunov in 2026
- Born: 26 August 1950 (age 76); Moscow, Soviet Union
- Education: Moscow State Institute of International Relations
- Known for: Diplomat, IR Scholar, Rector of Moscow State Institute of International Relations
- Awards: Honored Employee of the Diplomatic Service of the Russian Federation;
- Scientific career
- Fields: International relations
- Workplaces: Moscow State Institute of International Relations
- Website: torkunov.mgimo.ru

Signature
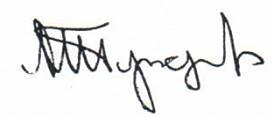

Anatoly Vasilyevich Torkunov (Russian: Анатолий Васильевич Торкунов; born 26 August 1950) is a Russian diplomat and international relations scholar.

The rector of Moscow's State Institute of International Relations, Torkunov is a member of the Presidium of the Russian Academy of Sciences and the Board of the Ministry of Foreign Affairs of the Russian Federation. He is the President of MGIMO Endowment Fund. He serves as chairman of the United Nations Association of Russia. He was a co-president of the Trianon Dialogue, Russian-French civil societies forum (2017–2022).

Torkunov is a Russian Orientalist, focused on international relations, regional subsystems in Asia-Pacific Region and North-Eastern Asia, the modern history of Korea, and diplomatic history and practice. His research interests are the historical and political factors of foreign policy-making, international conflicts, and regional studies.

== Biography ==
After graduating from MGIMO University (the Moscow State Institute of International Relations) in 1972, Torkunov began teaching at the institute, while carrying out post-graduate research related to Africa and Asia. He was awarded the degree of candidate of sciences in history for a PhD thesis on the installation and consolidation of bureaucratic military rule in South Korea in 1977. His administrative career included working on positions of the rector's assistant, dean of the international office, vice-rector for international cooperation. He was in diplomatic service in Pyongyang and Washington.

Upon returning to the Soviet Union, he resumed his work at MGIMO, where he was elected dean of the School of international relations (1986), then promoted to the position of the first vice-rector (1989). In 1991, he was granted the title of professor. In 1992, Torkunov was elected as rector of MGIMO (re-elected in 1997, 2002, 2007 and 2012). In 1993, he was awarded the rank of Ambassador, in 1995, he received the degree of doctor of political sciences (thesis: "Korean Peninsula Security Challenges: International and intra-Korean aspects"). In 1999, A. Torkunov was elected president of the Russian International Studies Association. Elected corresponding member of the Russian Academy of Sciences in 2003, he became a full member of the Academy in 2008. In 2022, he was elected member of the Presidium of the Russian Academy of Sciences.

Anatoly Torkunov actively works in the field of academic diplomacy. On the Russian side, he has been a co-chairman on such bilateral dialogues as the Russian-French civil society forum “Trianon Dialogue”, Russian-Polish Group on Difficult Matters, Commission on Difficult Matters of the History of Russian-Japanese Relations, the Russian-Czech Discussion Forum and a chairman of the Expert Council of the Russian-Polish Center for Dialogue and Agreement.

Torkunov holds the diplomatic rank of Ambassador Extraordinary and Plenipotentiary since 1993.

== Current activities ==
- Rector of the Moscow State Institute of International Relations (MGIMO).
- President of the United Nations Association of Russia.
- President of the Russian International Studies Association.
- Chair of the Board of Channel One Russia (2011–2020).
- Honorary member of the Russian Academy of Arts.

He is also foreign member of Polish Academy of Sciences, honorary professor of the National Academy of Sciences of the Republic of Armenia, honorary citizen of Seoul, honorary doctor of a number of universities.

== Research ==
Torkunov is the author of more than 150 research papers, including 9 individual monographs. Several of them were published in the United States, China, South Korea, Japan and other countries. Among them are «Mysterious War: Korean Conflict of 1950–1953» (Moscow, 2000; was published in Russian, Korean and Japanese), «The War of Korea: Its Origin, Bloodshed and Conclusion» (Tokyo, 2001). His works made great contribution to historical analysis and Korean studies, research of international relations in Asia-Pacific Region in 1950s and later. He wrote a «History of Korea» (Moscow, 2003, in Russian).

He is one of the authors, editors and project leaders of a collective monograph “Russian–Korean relations. Parallel History” (published in 2022 in Korean and Russian).

Torkunov is co-author and editor of monographs, dedicated to theoretical and methodological issues of international studies («Contemporary International Relations» — 1998, 1999, 2000, 2004, 2012 in Russian; «History of International Relations» (in 3 vol.) — 2012, in Russian; «Foreign Policy of Russia» — 2000, 2013, in Russian; «China in World Politics» — 2001, in Russian, etc.), co-author and editor of the first Russian textbook on «Diplomatic Service» (Moscow, 2002) and the second volume of «History of Russian MFA» (Moscow, 2002). He also chairs an international research project «Gorchakov’s Readings», which is focused on studying diplomatic history and practice. He is the co-editor of a two volumes of "History of International Relations and Russian Foreign Policy in the 20th Century" published by Cambridge Scholars Publishing in 2020.

Torkunov participated in several international research projects and is a member of editorial boards of a number of Russian and international academic journals.

== Honours and awards ==
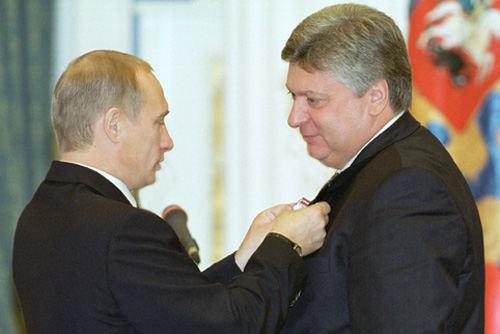
Anatoly Torkunov receives the Order of Merit for the Fatherland from President Vladimir Putin in 2000.

Anatoly Torkunov

He has received state awards of Russia, France, Italy, Poland, Republic of Korea, Mongolia, Bulgaria, Vietnam, Kazakhstan, Kyrgyzstan, Japan. Distinguished Scholar Award (Post-Communist Systems in International Relations Section), International Studies Association, 2018.

- Order of Alexander Nevsky (16 July 2015) – for contribution to the foreign policy of the Russian Federation, merits in scientific and pedagogical activity, training of highly qualified specialists and many years of diligent work
- Order of Merit for the Fatherland
  - 2nd class (26 August 2020) – for achievements in scientific and teaching activities, training of qualified specialists, and many years of conscientious work
  - 3rd class (14 May 2010) – for outstanding contribution to the implementation of the foreign policy of the Russian Federation and many years of diligent work, achievements in research and the teaching and training of highly qualified personnel
  - 4th class (26 August 2000) – for outstanding contribution to the training of highly qualified specialists and many years of diligent work
- Order of Honour (21 October 2004) – for the great achievements in research and training of highly qualified specialists
- Order of Friendship (6 October 1997) – for outstanding contributions to strengthening the economy, social development and in connection with the 850 year anniversary of the foundation of Moscow
- National Order of the Legion of Honour (France, 8 September 2011)
- Order of Merit of the Republic of Poland (Commander with star, Poland, 4 October 2010)
- Order of Friendship of Kazakhstan, 1st class (2019) and 2nd class (2007)
- Officer of the Order of Academic Palms (France, 2005)
- Order of the Star of Italy (Italy, 2020)
- Order of Merit of the Republic of Hungary
- Order of the Rising Sun of Japan (2021)
- Order of Diplomatic Service Merit of the Republic of Korea (2000)
- Friendship Order of Vietnam (2014)
- Order of the Polar Star of Mongolia (2021)
