= Idiriya =

Sri Lanka disability rights organization

IDIRIYA
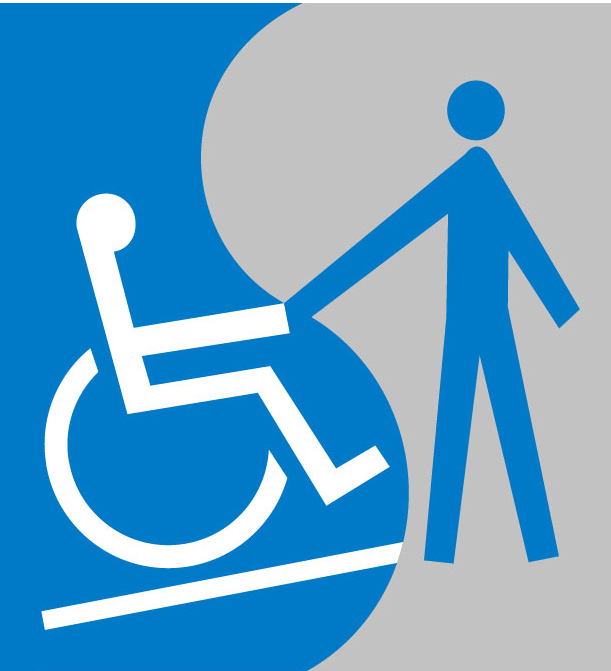
- Formation: 2005
- Type: Not-for-profit
- Location: Sri Lanka
- Chief executive / secretary-general: Ajith C. S. Perera

IDIRIYA is a not-for-profit humanitarian organisation focusing on disability rights based in Sri Lanka.

== History ==
IDIRIYA was founded in 2005 by disability activist Ajith C. S. Perera.

== Significant contributions ==
IDIRIYA in 2007 helped formulate the first Sri Lanka building design standard—SLS ISO TR 9527:2006.

A fundamental rights application was filed by IDIRIYA at the Supreme Court of Sri Lanka in March 2009.
