= Order of Friendship (Kazakhstan) =

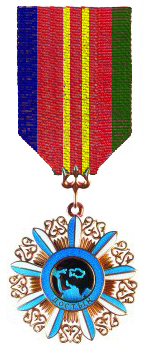
- Order of Friendship, 2nd class
- Awarded for: The promotion of international and civil consensus in society and the promotion of peace, friendship and cooperation between peoples.
- Presented by: Kazakhstan
- Established: 1995
- Ribbon of the order

The Order of Friendship (Kazakh: Достық ордені, Dostyq ordenı) is a state award of the Republic of Kazakhstan, introduced in 1995. It is awarded to individuals for the promotion of international and civil consensus in society and the promotion of peace, friendship and cooperation between peoples.

The ribbon is red with two narrow yellow central stripes and a green edge and a blue edge. The award has two classes. Recipients of the 1st class receive a star badge and the decoration symbol fitted with a shoulder ribbon. Recipients of the 2nd class receive a medal.

== Recipients ==
=== First Class ===
- Lee Hsien Loong (2026)
- Irakli Kobakhidze (2026)
- Nikos Christodoulides (2026)
- William Ruto (2026)
- Theyazin bin Haitham (2026)
- Andrej Babiš (2026)
- Sergio Mattarella (2025)
- To Lam (2025)
- Halimah Yacob (2023)
- Viktor Orbán (2023)
- Recep Tayyip Erdoğan (2022)
- Valentina Matviyenko (2019)
- Anatoly Torkunov (2019)
- Aleksandar Vučić (2018)
- Tomislav Nikolić (2016)
- François Hollande (2015)
- Lee Kuan Yew (2012)
- Sergey Lavrov (2012)
- Hillary Clinton (2011)
- Ban Ki-moon (2010)
- Mintimer Shaimiev (2010)
- Yevgeny Primakov (2007)
- László Sólyom (2007)
- Mikhail Kalashnikov (2003)
- Khalifa bin Zayed Al Nahyan (2001)
- Abdullah of Saudi Arabia (2001)
- George H. W. Bush (2001)
- Margaret Thatcher (2001)
- Klaus Schwab (2001)
- Alexy II of Moscow (2001)
- Hamad bin Khalifa Al Thani (2001)
- Jaber Al-Ahmad Al-Sabah (2001)
- Qaboos bin Said (2001)
- Zhang Deguang (2001)
- Sam Brownback (2001)
- Valdas Adamkus (2000)

=== Second Class ===
- Tao Mingxiu (2026)
- Samir Somaiya (2025)
- Péter Szijjártó (2025)
- Elena Rybakina (2022)
- Sergei Tsyrulnikov (2022)
- Ben van Beurden (2022)
- Igor Krutoy (2019)
- Valentina Matviyenko (2016)
- Irina Bokova (2014)
- Kirk Tinsley (2010)
- Joseph Kobzon (2008)
- Eduard Rossel (2007)
- Anatoly Torkunov (2006)
- Sergey Lavrov (2005)
- Viktor Khristenko (2004)
- Graham Allison (2002)
- Vladimir Solovyov (2001)

=== One-degree Order ===
- Viktor Sadovnichiy (1998)
- Yury Glazkov (1998)
- Andy Thomas (1998)
- Yuri Baturin (1998)
- Léopold Eyharts (1998)

== See also ==
- Orders, decorations, and medals of Kazakhstan
