= United Nations Association of Russia =

- Founded: 1956
- Location(s): Moscow, Russian Federation
- Key people: Anatoly Torkunov (current chairman)
- Website: http://www.una.ru/

The United Nations Association of Russia (UNA-Russia) is a non-profit organization dedicated to building understanding of and support for the ideals and work of the United Nations in the Russian Federation.

Founded as the United Nations Association of the Soviet Union (UNA-USSR) in 1956, the UNA-Russia affiliated with the World Federation of United Nations Associations, a global non-governmental movement which began in 1946 as a public movement for the United Nations.

The UNA-Russia's current chairman is diplomat Anatoly Torkunov, rector of Moscow State Institute of International Relations and member of the Russian Academy of Sciences.
