= United Nations Association of Sri Lanka =

- Abbreviation: UNASL
- Formation: 1949
- Headquarters: Panadura, Sri Lanka
- Head: Prof. Lakshman Marasinghe, President; Brig(retd) Granville Elapatha, Executive Chairman; Errol Smith, Secretary - General
- Parent organization: WFUNA
- Website: www.unasl.org

The United Nations Association of Sri Lanka is the leading independent policy authority on the United Nations in Sri Lanka and a Sri Lanka-wide grassroots membership organisation.

== UNA members ==
The UNA-Sri Lanka, as a grassroots membership organisation, has a large network of volunteer-run branches which give individuals across Sri Lanka a chance to partake in UN activities. These range from speaker to fundraising events, these activities raise awareness and interest in the work of the United Nations at a local level across the country.

== See also ==
- United Nations
- United Nations Association
- World Federation of United Nations Associations
- League of Nations Union
