= United Nations Association of Thailand =

The United Nations Association of Thailand (UNAT) was established in 1953 as a non-profit organization aiming to promote greater knowledge and awareness of works and principles of the United Nations among the general public as well as to provide updated information on its work and contributions to the international community. The association has devoted to the promotion of peace, justice, development and human rights. It also supports cooperation, friendship and understanding among sovereign states as well as the world’s citizens.

== Activities ==
UNAT’s works cover a wide range of activities such as seminar, exhibition, quiz, essay competition and painting competition on issues related to the UN works and principles. Several projects aim at reaching out to the Thai people in every part of the country. UNAT has been doing its part to assist the UN and the Thai people to come closer and to join hands in the quest for a better world. The association has issued a periodical newsletter to disseminate views and information on interesting international issues.

== Committee and members ==
The UNAT committee for the term of 2008-2010 consists of 13 members, with Ambassador Manaspas Xuto, a renowned diplomat, presiding as the president of the association. Membership is open to interested individuals and institutions.
