= United Nations Association =

Non-governmental organization

Flag of WFUNA, the federating body of all UN Associations

A United Nations Association (UNA) is a non-governmental organization that exists in various countries to enhance the relationship between the people of member states and the United Nations to raise public awareness of the UN and its work, to promote the general goals of the UN. The World Federation of United Nations Associations (WFUNA) was established in 1946 by 22 UN Associations. As of November 2025, there are over 100 UNAs around the world.

== History ==
The World Federation of United Nations Associations (WFUNA) was founded in Luxembourg on 2 August 1946 by 22 national United Nations Associations. This was a year after the proclamation of the UN Charter. The founding associations were those of Australia, Austria, Belgium, Brazil, Canada, China, Czechoslovakia, Denmark, France, Hungary, Iraq, Italy, Luxembourg, Netherlands, New Zealand, Norway, Poland, South Africa, Switzerland, Turkey, United Kingdom, United States of America.

== Aims and description ==
The long-term concerns of United Nations Associations comprise:

- The implementation of the Sustainable Development Goals
- Peace, security, and disarmament
- Human rights and humanitarian affairs

As of November 2025, there are over 100 UNAs around the world. The secretariat for WFUNA is located in Geneva and New York.

== Film festival ==
The UNA holds a yearly international documentary film festival in Palo Alto called the "United Nations Association Film Festival" (UNAFF). The festival was founded in 1998 to commemorate the 50th anniversary of the Universal Declaration of Human Rights, and is one of the oldest film festivals specifically for only documentary films in the United States.

== See also ==
- List of United Nations Associations
- League of Nations Union
- World citizen
- World Federation of United Nations Associations (WFUNA)
