= Secret Files and Origins =

"Secret Files and Origins" thematic stories

Publication information
- Publisher: DC Comics
- Schedule: Varied
- Title(s): Full list
- Formats: Multiple, thematically linked limited series and one-shot titles.
- Genre: Superhero
- Publication date: September 1997 – January 2022
- Main character(s): DC Universe

Secret Files and Origins (abbreviated SF&O) is a series of one-shot comic books and miniseries produced by DC Comics during the late 1990s and 2000s.

== Publication history ==
The books are a combination of origin stories (similar to the earlier Secret Origins series produced by DC), profile pages (like DC's Who's Who series from the 1980s), and short stories which sometimes serve as prologues to upcoming DC Comics storylines. Many early issues also featured timelines of significant events in the characters' histories, but this stopped after the release of Guide to the DC Universe 2000 Secret Files and Origins #1 (with the exception of the two Vertigo Secret Files and Origins issues). Some of these one-shots are released to coincide with a new series (such as the first JSA issue), or with a special event (such as the Infinite Crisis issue). Originally the books featured sequential numbering, but from 2003-2006 this was dropped in favor of putting the year of publication in the title (so for example, Aquaman Secret Files and Origins 2003 is the equivalent of Aquaman Secret Files and Origins #2); sequential numbering returned with the release of Green Lantern/Sinestro Corps: Secret Files and Origins #1 in 2007.

== Bibliography of Secret Files and Origins issues ==
Issue	Profile pages	Issue date	Notes
Aquaman Secret Files and Origins #1	Aquaman, Aquaman supporting cast (Atlan, Dolphin, Koryak, Nuidis Vulko), Black Manta, the Landlovers (Blubber, Lagoon Boy, Sheeva), Lava Lord, Mera, Noble, Ocean Master, Tempest	December 1998	
Aquaman Secret Files and Origins 2003	Aquaman, Hagen, the Lady of the Lake, McCaffrey and Sweeney, Mera and Vulko, Rodunn, Tempest, the Thirst	May 2003	
Batgirl Secret Files and Origins #1	Batgirl (Barbara Gordon), Batgirl (Cassandra Cain), Cain, Lady Shiva, Oracle, Sensor and Force 14	August 2002	
Batman Secret Files and Origins #1	Alfred Pennyworth, Azrael, Azrael supporting cast (Brian Bryan, Nomoz, Sister Lilhy), Batman, Birds of Prey (Black Canary, Oracle), Catwoman, Commissioner Gordon, the Gotham City Police Department (Caz Sallucci, Kevin "Survivor" Soong, MacKenzie "Hardback" Bock, Renee Montoya, Sarah Essen Gordon, Stan Kitch, Harvey Bullock, Billy Pettit), Huntress, Nightwing, Robin, Spoiler	October 1997	
Batman Secret Files #1	No profiles	December 2018	
Batman Secret Files #2	No profiles	September 2019	City of Bane tie-in issue
Batman Secret Files #3	No profiles	August 2020	
Batman Secret Files: The Signal #1	No profiles	September 2021	Released with three different covers
Batman Secret Files: Huntress #1	No profiles	September 2021	Released with three different covers
Batman Secret Files: Clownhunter #1	No profiles	October 2021	Released with three different covers
Batman Secret Files: Miracle Molly #1	No profiles	November 2021	Released with three different covers; Fear State tie-in issue
Batman Secret Files: Peacekeeper-01 #1	No profiles	December 2021	Released with three different covers; Fear State tie-in issue
Batman Secret Files: The Gardener #1	No profiles	January 2022	Released with three different covers; Fear State tie-in issue
Batman Allies Secret Files and Origins 2005	Batgirl, Batman, Catwoman, Nightwing, Onyx, Robin	August 2005	
Batman: Gotham City Secret Files and Origins #1	Arrakhat and Jaeger, the Banner, Batman, the Brentwood Gang (Alfred Pennyworth, Ali ben Khadir, Buzz Cohen, Cardigan, Dean Nederlander, Kip Kettering, Miss Bigelow, Wesley Thomas, Zugir), the Gotham City Police Department (Crispus Allen, Harvey Bullock, James Gordon, Mackenzie Bock, Renee Montoya), the Huntress, Kyle Abbot and Whisper A'Daire, Organized Crime (Burnley Town Massive (BTM), the Escabedo Cartel, the Lucky Hand Triad, the Mafia, the Odessa Mob), Samsara	April 2000	
Batman: No Man's Land Secret Files and Origins #1	Azrael, Batgirl, the Batsquad (Azrael, Batgirl, Batman, Nightwing, the Oracle, Robin), the Blue Boys (Billy Pettit, Clarence Foley, Harvey Bullock, James Gordon, Mackenzie "Hardback" Bock, Renee Montoya, Sarah Essen Gordon), Cain, Echo, Harley Quinn, Leslie Thompkins, Nicholas Scratch, Outside Interest, Penguin, Poison Ivy	December 1999	
Batman Villains Secret Files and Origins #1	Answer, Bane, Black Mask, Catwoman, Charaxes, Clayface, Ferak, Joker, Mr. Freeze, Poison Ivy, Ra's al Ghul, Scarecrow, Two-Face	October 1998	
Batman Villains Secret Files and Origins 2005	Black Mask, the Daughters of the Demon (Nyssa Raatko, Talia Head), Hush, Killer Croc, Man-Bat, Mr. Freeze, Penguin, Red Hood, Scarecrow	July 2005	
Birds of Prey Secret Files and Origins 2003	Batgirl, Black Canary, Huntress, Oracle	August 2003	
Catwoman Secret Files and Origins #1	Black Mask, Catwoman, Holly Robinson, Slam Bradley	November 2002	
Day of Judgment Secret Files and Origins #1	Asmodel, Deadman, Etrigan the Demon, Doctor Fate (Hector Hall), Phantom Stranger, Sentinels of Magic, Spectre (Hal Jordan), Zatanna	November 1999	
DCU Heroes Secret Files and Origins #1	Anarky, Atom (Ray Palmer), Captain Marvel, Chase, Chronos (Walker Gabriel), Hitman, L.A.W., Lobo, Martian Manhunter, Resurrection Man, Star-Spangled Kid (Courtney Whitmore) and S.T.R.I.P.E., Supernatural Saviors (Deadman, Doctor Fate, Etrigan the Demon, Jason Blood, Phantom Stranger, Zatanna), Vext, Wildcat	February 1999	
DCU Villains Secret Files and Origins #1	Amazo, Body Doubles, Buzzword and Dolmen, Malefic, Mawzir, Mister Mind, Mystical Menaces (Azarathea, Diabola, Dr. 7, Enchantress, Faust, the Gray Man, Houngan, Lord Ys, Qabala, Tannarak, Trance, Wizard), Neron, Ravens, Shiv, Solaris, Star Conqueror, Vandal Savage, Word	April 1999	
Final Crisis: Secret Files and Origins #1	No profiles	February 2009	Released with two different covers
Flash Secret Files and Origins #1	Abra Kadabra, Flash (Jay Garrick), Flash (Barry Allen), Flash (Wally West), Gorilla Grodd, Impulse, Jesse Quick, John Fox, Linda Park, Max Mercury, Pied Piper, Professor Zoom, the Rogues, Savitar, Trickster	November 1997	
Flash Secret Files and Origins #2	Angela Margolin, Cobalt Blue, Dark Flash, Folded Man, Kid Flash (Iris West), Replicant, Sela Allen	November 1999	
Flash Secret Files and Origins #3	Captain Cold, Cicada, Fred Chyre and Jared Morillo, Goldface, Gregory Wolfe, Iron Heights Penitentiary, Rogues (Blacksmith, Girder, Magenta, Mirror Master, Murmur, Plunder, Weather Wizard), Tar Pit	November 2001	First appearance of Hunter Zolomon
Flash Secret Files and Origins 2010	Abra Kadabra, Captain Boomerang, Captain Cold, Central City, Central City Crime Lab (Barry Allen, Darryl Frye, David Singh, James Forrest, Kristen Kramer), the Cosmic Treadmill, Doctor Alchemy, Flash (Barry Allen), Gorilla Grodd, Heat Wave, Iris West Allen, Keystone City, the Mirror Master, Professor Zoom the Reverse-Flash, the Speed Force (the Flash (Jay Garrick), the Flash (Wally West), Impulse (Iris "Irey" West), Jai West, Jesse Quick, John Fox, Kid Flash (Bart Allen), Max Mercury), the Trickster (Axel Walker), the Weather Wizard	May 2010	
Golden Age Secret Files and Origins #1	Crimson Avenger (Lee Travis), the Injustice Society of the World, Johnny Thunder, Justice Society of America	February 2001	
Green Arrow Secret Files and Origins #1	Arsenal, Black Canary, Eddie Fyers, Green Arrow (Oliver Queen), Green Arrow (Connor Hawke), Hard-Traveling Heroes (Connor Hawke and Kyle Rayner, Oliver Queen and Hal Jordan), Mia Dearden, Onomatopoeia, Stanley and His Monster	December 2002	
Green Lantern Secret Files and Origins #1	Doctor Light (Arthur Light), Doctor Polaris, Effigy, Fatality, Ganthet, Grayven, Hal Jordan/Parallax, Jade and Obsidian, John Stewart, Kyle Rayner, Radu Stancu and Company (Allison Chandler, Cleveland Rose, Kyle Rayner, Lee Adamson and Li Chiang, Nathan Straussman, Rachel Ginty), Sentinel, Sinestro, Sonar, Warrior	July 1998	
Green Lantern Secret Files and Origins #2	The Corps, the Dragon, Green Lantern (Kyle Rayner), Green Lantern supporting cast (Guy Gardner, John Stewart, Merayn Dethalis), Jade, Kyle Rayner's parents (Aaron and Maura Rayner), the Rogues Gallery (Effigy, Fatality, Grayven, Magaan, Manhunters, Sonar), Sentinel	September 1999	
Green Lantern Secret Files and Origins #3	The Circle of Fire Green Lanterns, Dark Lantern, Green Lantern (Alan Scott), Green Lantern (Kyle Rayner), Jade, John Stewart, Terry Berg	July 2002	
Green Lantern Secret Files and Origins 2005	The Guardians of the Universe, Guy Gardner, Hal Jordan, John Stewart, Kilowog, Kyle Rayner, the Manhunters, Mongul, Parallax, Sinestro	June 2005	
Green Lantern/Sinestro Corps Secret Files and Origins #1	Anti-Monitor, Black Lanterns, Carol Ferris, Cowgirl, the Emotional Spectrum, Ganthet, Green Lantern Corps (Aa, Adam, Alia, Amanita, Apros, Arisia Rrab, Arx, Ash, Ash-Pak-Glif, Barreer Wot, B'dg, Boodikka, Breeon, Brik, Brokk, Bynai Bruun, Bzzd, Charqwep, Chaselon, Cimfet Tau, the Collective, Dalor, Dkrtzy RRR, Droxelle, El'qa Squa Zreenah, Garmin Vid, Ghr'll and Xylpth, G'Hu, Gk'd, Gpaak, Graf Toren, Green Man, Greet, Gretti, Grumb, Guy Gardner, Hal Jordan, Hannu, Harvid, Horoq Nnot, Isamot Kol, John Stewart, Kaylark, Kilowog, Kraken, Krista X, Krydel-4, KT21, Kyle Rayner, Laira, Lan Dibbux, Larvox, Lashorr, Leezle Pon, Lin Canar, Lok Neboora, Lysandra, Malet Dasim, Markot Five, Matoo and Amnee Pree, M'Dahna, Meadlux, Medphyll, Mogo, Morro, Norchavius, Okonoko, Olapet, Oliversity, Opto309v, Palaqua, Penelops, Penn Maricc, Perdoo, Princess Iolande, Procanon Kaa, Raker Qarrigat, R'amey Holl, Rees-Van, Relok Hag, Remnant Nod, Rori Stroh, Rot Lop Fan, RRU-9-2, Saarek, Salaak, Sendrina, Sheriff Mardin, Shilandra Thane, Shorm, Sir Deeter, Skirl, Skyrd, Sodam Yat, Soranik Natu, Spol, Stel, Symon Terrynce, Taa, Tagort, Tahr, Talmadge, T-Cher, Tomar-Tu, Tomy-Fai, Torquemada, Tuebeen, Turytt, Umitu, Vandor, Varix, Vath Sarn, Venizz, Vode-M, Volk, Von Daggle, Voz, Wissen, Zghithii), the Guardians of the Universe, Ion, Parallax, Sayd, the Sinestro Corps (Amon Sur, Ampa Nnn, Arkillo, Bedovian, Borialosaurus, Braach, Bur'Gunza, Cyborg Superman, Despotellis, DevilDog, Fatality, Feena Sik, Flayt, Gleen, Haasp, Karu-Sil, Kiriazis, Kretch, Kryb, Low, Lyssa Drak, Maash, Mallow, the Manhunters, Mongul, Moose, Murr the Melting Man, Romat-Ru, Schlagg-Man, Scivor, Seer Ruggle, Setag Retss, Sinestro, Sirket, Slushh, Smithwick, Snap Trap, Sn'Hoj, Stanch, Starro, Tekik, Tri-Eye, Yellow Lantern), the Star Sapphires, Superman-Prime	February 2008	
Guide to the DC Universe 2000 Secret Files and Origins #1	The Allies of the Batman (Azrael, Batgirl, Batman, the Huntress, Nightwing, the Oracle, Robin), Amazonian Allies (Artemis, Chiron, Hippolyta, Nubia, Rama, Wonder Girl, Wonder Woman), Aquaman's Royal Court (Aquaman, the Dolphin, Mera, Tempest, Vulko), the Creature Commandos, the Flash "Family" (the Flash (Jay Garrick), the Flash (Wally West), Impulse, Jesse Quick, Max Mercury), the Green Lanterns (Green Lantern (Kyle Rayner), Guy Gardner, Jade, John Stewart, Sentinel, the Spectre (Hal Jordan)), the JLA, the JSA, Orion and the New Gods, Team Superman (Eradicator, Steel, Strange Visitor, Superboy, Supergirl, Superman), the Titans, Young Justice	March 2000	
Guide to the DC Universe 2001-2002 Secret Files and Origins #1	The Doom Patrol, Haven, Josie Mac, the Legion, Orpheus, the Power Company, the Suicide Squad	February 2002	
Hawkman Secret Files and Origins #1	Dr. Fate (Hector Hall), Gentleman Ghost, Hawkgirl (Kendra Saunders), Hawkman (Carter Hall), Kristopher Roderic, Nighthawk and Cinnamon, Shadow Thief, Speed Saunders, Stonechat Museum of Art and History	October 2002	
Hellblazer Vertigo Secret Files and Origins #1	Chas Chandler; the Constantine Family (Cheryl and Gemma Masters, Harry Constantine, James Constantine, Kon-Sten-Tyn, Lady Johanna Constantine, Pyotr Konstantin, Thomas Constantine); the First of the Fallen; John Constantine; John Constantine's London; Kit Ryan; Newcastle; Nigel Archer, Header and the Reverend Rick Neilsen; Papa Midnite; Rich Eldridge, Michelle Hanson and Dani Wright; Swamp Thing; Trenchcoat Brigade; Zed, Marj and Mercury	August 2008	
Infinite Crisis Secret Files and Origins 2006	Alex Luthor (Earth-Three), Lois Lane (Earth-Two), Superboy (Earth-Prime), Superman (Earth-Two)	April 2006	
Infinite Frontier Secret Files #1	No profiles	August 2021	Contains stories that were originally released in digital format prior to the print version
JLA Secret Files and Origins #1	Aquaman, Aztek, Batman, Flash (Wally West), Green Arrow (Connor Hawke), Green Lantern (Kyle Rayner), Injustice Gang of the World, Key, Lord of Time, Martian Manhunter, Superman, Wonder Woman, Zauriel	September 1997	
JLA Secret Files and Origins #2	Adam Strange, Big Barda, Hourman android, Huntress, the Oracle, Orion, Plastic Man, Prometheus, Red Tornado, Steel, Tomorrow Woman, Zauriel	August 1998	
JLA Secret Files and Origins #3	Advance Man, General, JLA, Mageddon, Quantum Mechanics, Queen Bee, Queen of Fables, Qwsp, White Martians	December 2000	
JLA Secret Files and Origins 2004	Justice League Elite, Justice League of America (Satellite Era), Red King, Ultramarine Corps	November 2004	
JLA in Crisis Secret Files and Origins #1	Armageddon 2001, Bloodlines, Crisis on Infinite Earths, Crisis on Parallel Earths, DC One Million, Eclipso: The Darkness Within, The Final Night, Genesis, Invasion!, Legends, Millennium, Underworld Unleashed, War of the Gods, Zero Hour: Crisis in Time	November 1998	
JLA/JSA Secret Files and Origins #1	Ancients, Aquaman, Captain Marvel, Crimson Avenger, Faith, Firestorm, Hourman (Rick Tyler), Power Girl, Star-Spangled Kid	January 2003	
Joker/Harley: Criminal Sanity - Secret Files	No profiles	September 2020	Part of the DC Black Label storyline Joker/Harley: Criminal Sanity
Joker: Last Laugh Secret Files and Origins #1	Black Mass, Carnivora, Leather, Meathead, Multi-Man, Rancor, Shilo Norman and Dina Bell	December 2001	The beginning of the storyline Joker: Last Laugh
JSA Secret Files and Origins #1	Atom Smasher, Black Canary, Dark Lord, Doctor Mid-Nite, Extant, Fate's Legacy (Doctor Fate (Kent Nelson), Doctor Fate (Linda Strauss), Fate (Jared Stevens), Nabu), Flash (Jay Garrick), Hawkgirl, Hourman, Mister Terrific (Michael Holt), Obsidian, Sand, Sentinel, Spectre, Starman (Jack Knight), Star-Spangled Kid, Wildcat, Wonder Woman (Hippolyta)	August 1999	
JSA Secret Files and Origins #2	Alexander Montez, Black Adam, Brainwave (Henry King, Jr.), Director Bones, Hawkman and Hawkgirl, Injustice Society, Jakeem Thunder, Nemesis (Soseh Mykros), Roulette, Sin Eater, Solomon Grundy, Ultra-Humanite	September 2001	
Just Imagine...Stan Lee's Secret Files and Origins #1	Aquaman, Batman, Catwoman, Church of Eternal Empowerment, Coming Crisis, Flash, Green Lantern, JLA, Reverend Dominic Darrk, Robin, the Sandman, Shazam, Superman, Wonder Woman	March 2002	Part of the storyline Just Imagine...Stan Lee Creating the DC Universe
Legion of Super-Heroes Secret Files and Origins #1	Apparition, Brainiac 5, Chameleon, Cosmic Boy, Element Lad, Gates, Invisible Kid, Kinetix, Live Wire, M'Onel, Saturn Girl, Spark, Star Boy, Triad, Ultra Boy, Umbra, Violet, XS	January 1998	
Legion of Super-Heroes Secret Files and Origins #2	The Blight, Brainiac 5, the Elements of Disaster, Fallen Heroes (the Hall of Fallen Heroes (Atom'X, Blast-Off, Kid Quantum, Leviathan), Shanghalla (G'dath of the Silvans, the Science Police Memorial, the Shrine to the Unknown Martian, S'tern Ro'g)), Ferro, Karate Kid, Kid Quantum II, Monstress, Pernisius, Sensor, Thunder	June 1999	
Legion Secret Files and Origins 3003	No profiles	January 2004	
Lego Batman Secret Files and Origins	Arkham Asylum, Batcave, Batman, Joker, the Penguin and Freeze, Robin and Nightwing, Two-Face	2006	Promo comic
New Gods Secret Files and Origins #1	Big Barda and Mister Miracle, Darkseid, Darkseid's Elite (DeSaad, Doctor Bedlam, Granny Goodness, Kalibak, Kanto, Steppenwolf, Virman Vundabar), Highfather, Metron, Mortalla, Orion, Takion	September 1998	
Nightwing Secret Files and Origins #1	Blockbuster (Roland Desmond), Blüdhaven Police Dept. (Amy Rohrbach, Mason "Mac" Arnot, Phillip Aswal Addad, Police Chief Francis Alexander Redhorn, Richard Grayson), Brutale, Double Dare, Haly's Circus, Lady Vic, Nightwing, Nite-Wing, Shrike, the Stallion, Supporting Cast (Amygdala, Bridget Clancy, Hank "Hero" Hogan, Tarantula, Michael "Mutt" Hogan), Torque	October 1999	
President Luthor Secret Files and Origins #1	Luthor's Cabinet (Amanda Waller, Frank Rock, Jefferson Pierce, Sam Lane), Pete Ross and Lana Lang, President Lex Luthor, Talia Head	March 2001	
Silver Age Secret Files and Origins #1	Agamemno, Challengers of the Unknown, Dial H for Hero, Doom Patrol, Flash (Barry Allen), Green Lantern (Hal Jordan), Injustice League, Justice League of America, Metal Men, Seven Soldiers of Victory (Silver Age), Teen Titans	July 2000	
Starman Secret Files and Origins #1	The Mist family (Mist (Kyle), Mist (Nash)); the O'Dare family; Scalphunter; Shade; Starman (Ted Knight) and Starman (David Knight); Starman (Mikaal Tomas); Starman (Jack Knight); Starmen (Starman of 1951), Prince Gavyn, and Will Payton	April 1998	
Superman Secret Files and Origins #1	Clark Kent, the Daily Planet, the Guardian, Jimmy Olsen, Lois Lane, Martha and Jonathan Kent, Metropolis Special Crimes Unit, Perry White, Scorn, S.T.A.R. Labs, Superman Red/Superman Blue	January 1998	
Superman Secret Files and Origins #2	The Anti-Hero, the Contessa, Dominus, Gog, Kismet, LexCom, Misa, Strange Visitor, Superman, Superman Robots, Supermen of America	May 1999	
Superman Secret Files and Origins 2004	Eradicator, Father Daniel Leone, Gog, Lupé Teresa Leocadio-Escudero, Mister Majestic, Preus, Replikon, the Shack, Supergirl (Kara Zor-El)	August 2004	
Superman Secret Files and Origins 2005	Blackrock, the Daily Planet staff (Geraldine "Gerry" Frank, Jimmy Olsen, Josef Schuman, Perry White, Ron Troupe), Lex Luthor, Lois Lane, Ruin, Superman	January 2006	
Superman Secret Files and Origins 2009 #1	Alura and the Guilds of New Krypton (the Artists Guild, the Labor Guild, the Military Guild, the Religious Guild, the Science Guild), Brainiac, the Daily Planet (Cat Grant, Jimmy Olsen, Lana Lang, Lois Lane, Perry White, Ron Troupe, Steve Lombard), Flamebird (Thara Ak-Var), General Zod/Commander Ursa/Non, the Guardian, Krypto, the Kryptonian Military Unit "Red Shard" (Aspirant Dal Kir-Ta, Aspirant First Class Jeq-Vay, "Aspirant" Non, Aspirant Sem-Re, Commander Gor, Lieutenant Asha Del-Nar), Lex Luthor, Metropolis, Mon-El, New Krypton, Nightwing (Chris Kent), Project 7734 (Atlas, Codename: Assassin, General Sam Lane, Metallo, Reactron), Superboy, Supergirl, Superman	October 2009	
Superman/Batman Secret Files and Origins 2003	Batman, Metallo, President Lex Luthor, Superman, the Superman/Batman "Families" (Batgirl, the Huntress, Krypto, Natasha Irons, Nightwing, Robin, Superboy, Supergirl (Cir-El), Talia Head	November 2003	
Superman: Metropolis Secret Files and Origins #1	Brainiac 13, the Daily Planet, the Eradicator, Hope and Mercy, Imperiex, La Encantadora, the Metropolis Special Crimes Unit, Prankster, Rose and Thorn, S.T.A.R. Labs, Steel, Superman and Lois Lane	June 2000	
Superman: Our Worlds at War Secret Files and Origins #1	Alien Allies (Adam Strange, Darkseid, Grayven, Massacre, Maxima, Mongal, Starfire), Earth Allies (Chemo, General Frank Rock, Hope and Mercy, the JLA, the JSA, Lobo, Manchester Black, Martian Manhunter, Mongul, Mr. Terrific, Nicole Stein, Nightwing, the Oracle, Plasmus, President Luthor, Shrapnel, Star-Spangled Kid, Supergirl, Superman, Young Justice), Krypto, the Zod Squad (Faora, General Zod, Ignition, Kancer)	August 2001	
Superman Villains Secret Files and Origins #1	Atomic Skull, Brainiac, Cyborg Superman, Doomsday, Lex Luthor, Mainframe, Maxima, Metallo, Mister Mxyzptlk, Obsession, Parasite, Riot, Rock, Silver Banshee, Toyman	June 1998	
Swamp Thing Vertigo Secret Files and Origins #1	Abby Holland, Agent Orange, Anton Arcane, Barnabas Tookoome, Daphne, Floronic Man, John Constantine, Kudzu, Matthew Cable, Molly Hayes Kilroy, Pilate, Swamp Thing, Tefé Holland	November 2000	
Team Superman Secret Files and Origins #1	Amanda Quick and Natasha Irons, Buzz and Linda Danvers, Comet, Crash, Doctor Villain, Fred and Sylvia Danvers, King Shark, Leesburg friends (Cutter Sharp, Dick Malverne, Mattie Harcourt), Project Cadmus, Scavenger, Skorpio, Steel, Superboy, Supergirl, Tana Moon and Roxy Leech, Twilight, Wally, the Wild Men	May 1998	
Teen Titans/Outsiders Secret Files and Origins 2003	Beast Boy; Cyborg; Deathstroke; Grace Choi; Indigo; Kid Flash (Bart Allen); Metamorpho; Nightwing, Jade and Arsenal; Raven; Robin; Starfire; Superboy; Thunder; Wonder Girl	December 2003	
Teen Titans/Outsiders Secret Files and Origins 2005	Batman and the Outsiders, Blackfire, Brother Blood, Donna Troy, Dr. Light, the Fearsome Five, Hawk and Dove (Holly and Dawn Granger), Ravager, Shift, Speedy (Mia Dearden), Superboy	October 2005	
Titans Secret Files and Origins #1	Argent, Arsenal, Cyborg, Damage, Damien Darhk, Flash, Goth, H.I.V.E., Jesse Quick, Nightwing, Starfire, Tartarus, Tempest, Titans supporting cast (Changeling, Deathstroke, Lian Harper, Lilith Clay, Raven, Supergirl), Troia	March 1999	
Titans Secret Files and Origins #2	Beast Boy, Bushido, Cyborg, Deathstroke, Epsilon, Flamebird, the Hangmen (Breathtaker, Killshot, Provoke, Shock Trauma, Stranglehold), Lian Harper, Matt Logan, the Titans	October 2000	
Wonder Woman Secret Files and Origins #1	The Amazons of Themyscira, Ares, Artemis, the Cheetah (Barbara Ann Minerva), Circe, Donna Troy, the Gods of Olympus, Helena Sandsmark, Herakles, Julia and Vanessa Kapatelis, Mike Schorr, Wonder Girl, Wonder Woman (Diana), Wonder Woman (Hippolyta)	March 1998	
Wonder Woman Secret Files and Origins #2	Ares' Children, Cronus and his Children (Arch, Disdain, Harrier, Oblivion, Slaughter, Titan), Devastation, the Dome Creatures (Chiron, Ladon, Pegasus, the Sphinx), the Gods of Olympus, Wonder Woman	July 1999	
Wonder Woman Secret Files and Origins #3	Ares, Artemis, Fury (Helena Kosmatos), the Gods of Olympus, Helena Sandsmark, Heracles, Hippolyta, Mount Olympus, Shim'Tar, Troia, Villains (the Cheetah (Sebastian Ballesteros), Circe, Doctor Psycho, the Silver Swan (Vanessa Kapatelis), Villainy Inc.), Wonder Girl, Wonder Woman, Wonder Woman supporting characters (Etta Candy Trevor, Julia Kapatelis, Steve Trevor, Trevor Barnes, Vanessa Kapatelis), Wonder Woman's weapons and equipment (Bracelets, Invisible Jet, Magic Lasso, Sandals of Hermes, Tiara)	May 2002	
Young Justice Secret Files and Origins #1	Arrowette, Bedlam, Impulse, Old Justice, Red Tornado, Rip Roar, Robin, Secret, Superboy, Wonder Girl	January 1999	
Young Justice: Sins of Youth Secret Files and Origins #1	The Agenda, Cissie King-Jones, Empress, Impulse, JLA Jr., the Junior Society of America, Klarion the Witch Boy, Lagoon Boy, Li'l Lobo, Marvel Family (Captain Marvel, CM3, Mary Marvel), the Point Men, Robin, Secret, Star-Spangled Kid, Superboy, Titans, Wonder Girl, Young Villains (the Junior Injustice League - Li'l Amazo, Li'l Black Adam, Li'l Manta, Li'l Pengy, Li'l Sphynx, Mini-Maxima, Private Cold)	May 2000	
