= Ray (Ray Terrill) =

The Ray
- Artwork for the cover of Justice League of America: The Ray Rebirth #1 (January 2017, DC Comics), art by Joe Prado and Ivan Reis.

Publication information
- Publisher: DC Comics
- First appearance: The Ray #1 (February 1992)
- Created by: Jack C. Harris (writer); Joe Quesada (artist)

In-story information
- Alter ego: Raymond C. "Ray" Terrill
- Species: Metahuman
- Team affiliations: Freedom Fighters; Justice League; Justice League International; Young Justice; Forgotten Heroes; Justice League of America II; Justice League Queer
- Abilities: Generation of light and solid light constructs; Conversion to energy form; Flight

The Ray (Raymond C. "Ray" Terrill) is a superhero in the DC Comics Universe. He is the second character to use the codename the Ray. Ray Terrill first appeared in The Ray #1 (February 1992), and was created by Jack C. Harris and Joe Quesada.

Ray Terrill appeared in The CW's fourth annual Arrowverse crossover event with Arrow, The Flash, the Legends of Tomorrow, and Supergirl titled "Crisis on Earth-X". He was played by Russell Tovey, who would also voice the character in the CW Seed series Freedom Fighters: The Ray. Tovey returned in a cameo in the crossover event Crisis on Infinite Earths.

== Publication history ==
Ray's debut miniseries was created by Jack C. Harris and Joe Quesada, edited by Jim Owsley.

== Fictional character biography ==
=== Origins ===
From a young age, Raymond Terrill is told by his father that exposure to direct sunlight will kill him. Privately tutored in his home, he is dubbed "Night Boy" by the media. At the age of eighteen, Ray learns the truth about his heritage while at the deathbed of his father, "Happy" Terrill. Happy admits that he was the Golden Age Ray, and that exposure to sunlight will activate Raymond's light-based superpowers.

At the funeral for "Happy" Terrill, Ray meets his cousin, Hank, who urges him to become a superhero like his father. When he refuses, "Happy" shows up alive, in his classic Ray costume and looking far younger than he should, to meet his son. He tells Raymond that he was in fact raised by his uncle, Thomas Terrill, and that he must use his newfound powers to save the Earth from a powerful cosmic light-entity. Raymond eventually decides to take up the mantle of "the Ray", defeats Doctor Polaris, and succeeds in dissuading the light entity from its destructive purpose.

=== Justice League ===
Ray's adventures continue, bringing him to battle with villains such as Brimstone, Neron, and Vandal Savage. Following the death of Superman, Ray is recruited into the Justice League for roughly a year of service. During this time, Ray has a brief romance with Black Canary. His tenure with the League takes place as the team was split into different factions, one led by Wonder Woman who consistently deferred to the team's United Nations mandate and the other, more hotheaded Captain Atom. Ray was present when fellow League member Ice was killed by the Overmaster, prompting a number of member departures and signifying the end of the League operating closely with the U.N. Ray is then asked to join the ranks of Justice League Task Force, led by Martian Manhunter. With the Task Force he shared a number of adventures, including repeated tangling with Savage. Ray eventually began to view fellow Task Force members Gypsy and Triumph as a family and viewed Martian Manhunter in more of a fatherly role than his actual father. This was complicated by Triumph's frequent conflicts for leadership with the Manhunter. Though Ray's own issues (as shown within his solo series, which ran concurrently with Justice League Task Force) caused him to leave the team, he would eventually leave to aid them in their last off-world mission to help the robot L-Ron, who was then inhabiting Despero's body. The last adventure of Justice League Task Force involved their traveling to the center of the Earth and into Skartaris, world of the Warlord. Ray's body was taken over by a mystic and used against the team until he was freed by his friends.

=== Solo series ===
Ray's own monthly comic, penned by Christopher Priest and drawn mainly by Howard Porter, ran for 28 issues from 1994 to 1996. In this series, Ray confronts several villains and anti-heroes, including an out of control child with powers similar to Ray's (who turns out to be his half-brother, Joshua), and a computer game villain known as Death Masque that has somehow become real. His relationship with his father is strained several times as he discovers the extent of Happy's manipulative streak, and the well-intentioned deceptions he had perpetrated concerning his own family. When Triumph, disregarding the orders of the Martian Manhunter, refuses to help Ray deal with Death Masque, Ray turns instead to Vandal Savage for help. Savage coaches Ray for some time, utilizing his little-used skill with computers and giving Ray a high business position. When Death Masque targets Ray's mother, he manages to re-program and then destroy the computerized villain for good. A woman claiming to be Ray's girlfriend from the future brutally attacks Savage to show Ray, who had begun to think of Savage on almost friendly terms, that Savage stole body parts from his many descendants whenever he was critically injured. This prompts Ray to sever his ties with Savage. When Ray's mother learns he is still alive (Happy led her to believe Ray died in childbirth) they share a happy reunion. He is also faced with glimpses of an unpleasant possible future which he may have averted by the series' conclusion.

After the disbanding of Justice League Task Force to make way for the newly formed JLA, Ray keeps a Justice League reserve-member status - but is rarely seen in DC Comics for several years. Ray also joins another team, the Forgotten Heroes, led by Resurrection Man. Brought together to take down Vandal Savage, the team eventually disbands and Ray presumably continues a solo hero career.

In The Final Night, Ray participates in making a secondary sun to try and fool the Sun-Eater. He also personally watches out for a small Mexican town, using his powers to make sure it is sufficiently heated. This task uses up most of Ray's power until he collapses, drained. A kiss from Fire provides enough power to rejuvenate Ray and with the help of Zatanna and Firestorm, the fate of the town is assured.

Around this time he is approached by the demon Neron, who attempts to gain his soul. Neron, despite being far beyond the concepts of gender, has to resort to pretending to be Circe after part of the plan involves a kiss and Ray comes to believe he has kissed a guy. In the end, Ray does not fulfill his part of the bargain and, as a result, does not lose his soul.

Ray later takes part in saving the universe against the might of an ancient weapon called Mageddon. Following this, Ray appears at a Titans West recruitment drive party in Los Angeles. Although he joins Green Lantern's Justice League of Air during the "Justice Leagues" crisis (wherein each member forms their own minor league), he soon is back adventuring on his own.

=== Young Justice ===
Ray joins Young Justice after saving a boy's life while the team rides a tram car to F.D.R. Island. He is with the team during their assault on Zandia on behalf of Empress and uses up his entire supply of energy to strike a crippling blow against the vampire Lady Zand. In the interests of expanding Young Justice, then leader Wonder Girl agrees to make the team part of a reality TV show. This backfires when Secret, having been corrupted, turns against Young Justice and the footage is broadcast on the Internet. After Darkseid removes Secret's powers, Ray leaves the team, which itself disbands soon afterward following the death of Donna Troy. Soon afterward, he meets the Nowhere Men, the deadly figments of a writer's imagination accidentally brought to life. With the goal of wiping out the individuality of the world, the Nowhere Men began by attacking superheroes. They use beams that cause a type of "suspended animation". Ray is caught in one of these beams, along with Elongated Man and Major Victory. After a long battle with Superman, the Nowhere Men are defeated and Ray and the others are freed.

=== Freedom Fighters and Infinite Crisis ===
Ray joins other JSA reserves to help contain the damage caused by the villainous trio of Mordru, Obsidian, and Eclipso. He later joins a new, government-sponsored Freedom Fighters team. However, the Freedom Fighters are ambushed and many of the team are murdered by the Secret Society. As he is dragged away by Psycho-Pirate, Ray is told that Luthor (Alexander Luthor Jr. of Earth-Three) needs him alive. Ray is captured for Alex's master plan, but later escapes during the battle in the Arctic along with Power Girl, Breach, Lady Quark and all the other prisoners attached to the reality altering tower created from the Anti-Monitor's corpse. There, Ray deduces that it was Psycho-Pirate responsible for manipulating Bizarro into beating the Human Bomb to death. Before managing to use his emotion-altering powers on Ray and Power Girl, Psycho-Pirate is killed by Black Adam.

=== One Year Later ===
At the beginning of DC's One Year Later event, Ray Terrill's whereabouts are unknown. In the Superman storyline "Up Up and Away", Ray tries to repower a weakened Superman along with the heroic Doctor Light, unsuccessfully.

Ray finally returns to action in Uncle Sam and the Freedom Fighters #7. Wearing a new costume, he encounters and defeats Stan Silver, who has taken the name "Ray" for himself. Ray Terrill then joins the new Freedom Fighters. Though captured by the villainous Red Bee, Ray and the rest of the Fighters eventually manage to turn the tables on the insect alien invaders, defeating them. To accomplish this, Ray's father Happy drank from the desert oasis of Neon the Unknown, vastly increasing his own powers and leading Happy to take the name Neon for himself. Ray and Happy are later shown at a baseball game, attempting to reconcile their rocky relationship.

=== Final Crisis ===
The Ray became an important part of the resistance against Darkseid and his Justifiers. He acted as a courier due to his ability to escape the Anti-Life Equation's powers and delivered the Daily Planet issues still being produced from Superman's Fortress of Solitude. When the Justifiers attacked the Justice League Watchtower, Ray turned into a carrier wave capable of teleporting most of the people there away, although Green Arrow chose to stay behind to buy them time. He later managed to create a massive Metron Emblem across Earth, disrupting the Anti-Life broadcast and crippling Darkseid's operation.

=== Blackest Night ===
In Blackest Night, Ray obtains a Black Lantern power ring at the behest of Simon Stagg and brings it to an underground lab for examination. The lab was then attacked by a swarm of Black Lanterns. Ray was last seen fighting a number of Western-themed Black Lanterns, including Super-Chief and Scalphunter. After ordering the other living humans out of the line of fire, Ray released enough power to bring down the underground complex. Despite this, neither of the two humans he bought time for managed to escape the town alive. His condition was, at the time, unknown, but he has since appeared alive and unharmed.

=== Outsiders ===
While escaping from a hostile attacking force, Black Lightning, Metamorpho, and Owlman are forced to take refuge in Simon Stagg's secret base previously seen partially destroyed during the attack of the Black Lanterns. After an initial fight with Stagg's employee Freight Train, Metamorpho is later attacked by Stagg's servant Java and merged with the chemical monstrosity Chemo. After Owlman and Freight Train defeat Chemo, they contact Stagg, who sends Ray, apparently still in the man's employment, to help separate Metamorpho from Chemo, though Ray confesses he has no idea how Stagg knew of Metamorpho's condition.

=== Uncle Sam and the Freedom Fighters ===
Throughout all of this, Ray remained affiliated with Uncle Sam and the Freedom Fighters as they continued to fight for America against such threats as the Living America, a superhuman prison break, and Jester and the Arcadians. Finally, the team was destroyed by the one foe they could not fight - government cutbacks.

=== DC Rebirth ===
Like the earlier version of the character, the DC Rebirth version of Ray Terrill was told that any exposure to direct sunlight will kill him. Running away from home as a teen, he soon discovered that exposure to light grants him light-based superpowers, including flight, light projection and invisibility. Ray eventually settles in Vanity, Oregon (previously seen in Aztek) where he saves a childhood friend from a supervillain hate-group. This version of the Ray is openly gay. He is later recruited into Batman's new Justice League of America which includes Atom, Vixen, Black Canary, Killer Frost, and Lobo. He also dates Xenos, the League engineer.

== Other versions ==
New Super-Man features a character named Sunbeam (an analog of the Ray).

In the comic book Countdown: Arena, Ray is revealed as an analogue of the Wildstorm Universe character Apollo, another light-based superhero.

== Powers and abilities ==
Ray absorbs, stores and processes light; uses the energy to fly and create destructive bursts of radiation. His energy capacity is virtually limitless. He is capable of manipulating light to create illusions and even solid light constructs, as well as render himself and others invisible. He can convert his body completely into any wavelength of the EM Spectrum. No physical harm from impact can come to him in this form (as demonstrated when Lobo punched Ray through his skull). This process can also be used to "reset" damage that his physical form has already sustained. As pure energy, he can travel at the speed of light and cross space unassisted.

== In other media ==
=== Television ===
- Ray Terrill / Ray makes non-speaking appearances in Justice League Unlimited as a member of the Justice League.
- Ray Terrill / Ray appears in media set in the Arrowverse, portrayed by Russell Tovey. This version is from Tulsa, Oklahoma on Earth-1 before he was transported to Earth-X, where he received his powers from his Earth-X counterpart, joined the Freedom Fighters in fighting the New Reichsmen, and entered a relationship with Citizen Cold.
  - He appears in the CW Seed animated series Freedom Fighters: The Ray, voiced by Tovey.
  - In the live-action crossover event "Crisis on Earth-X", he joins forces with heroes from Earth-1 and Earth-38 to defeat the New Reichsmen. Despite being offered to return to Earth-1, Ray elects to stay to defeat the New Reichsmen's remnants.
  - Ray makes an uncredited cameo appearance in the live-action crossover event "Crisis on Infinite Earths".

=== Film ===
Ray Terrill / Ray makes non-speaking appearances in Justice League: Crisis on Infinite Earths.

=== Miscellaneous ===
Ray Terrill / Ray makes non-speaking appearances in DC Super Hero Girls as a student of Super Hero High.
