= Match (DC Comics) =

- Match as depicted in Teen Titans (vol. 3) #43 (March 2007). Art by Tony Daniel.

Publication information
- Publisher: DC Comics
- First appearance: Superboy (vol. 4) #35 (January 1997)
- Created by: Ron Marz (writer); Ramon Bernado (artist)

In-story information
- Species: Metahuman clone (1997–2003); Human/Kryptonian hybrid clone (2003–present)
- Team affiliations: Titans East; The Agenda; Project Cadmus; Suicide Squad
- Notable aliases: Superboy; Superman; Kent Conner; Bizarro; Bizarro Superboy; Bizarro Boy; Ultraman
- Abilities: Tactile telekinesis; Kryptonian physiology; Superhuman strength, stamina, durability, speed, agility, reflexes, and hearing; Flight; Enhanced vision; X-ray vision; Microscopic vision; Telescopic vision; Heat vision; Wind breath; Voice manipulation

Match is a fictional character in the DC Comics Universe. He is a clone of Superboy (Conner Kent). Match appeared in the Superboy title, issues of Young Justice and the Sins of Youth and Joker's Last Laugh crossover events. Currently, he is a member of the Suicide Squad.

Match has made limited appearances in media outside comics, with Nolan North voicing him in the animated series Young Justice.

== Fictional character biography ==
Cover to Superboy (vol. 4) #36 by Ramon Bernado. Match's original appearance, including his blond hairstyle, was later changed to resemble Bizarro.

Match is a clone of Superboy who was created after he was kidnapped by Amanda Spence, an operative of the secret organization Agenda. Match is given implanted memories, like Superboy, but they include a greater host of information that Superboy did not have. He also has increased durability and greater control over his powers. In the resulting battle between the two clones, Superboy manages to come out on top and the reactor holding the Agenda's compound together explodes, destroying the base. Match is left alone and ailing.

Some time later, the Agenda kidnaps Superboy again and takes over Project Cadmus, with Match infiltrating Young Justice in Superboy's place. Cadmus is infiltrated by several clones loyal to the Agenda. Eventually, Superboy frees himself and joins the fight against Match and the Agenda to free Cadmus.

During the Last Laugh event, Match infiltrates Young Justice disguised as Superboy. While Match is unable to keep his plans secret from the girls, they believe he is Superboy pretending to be Match to try to lighten the mood after Robin and Impulse quit the group. Match leaves after accidentally making Wonder Girl confess her love for Superboy, causing Match to develop feelings for her as well.

=== Titans East ===
In the series Teen Titans, Superboy is established to be a clone of Superman and Lex Luthor, making Match a clone of them as well.

The criminal mercenary Deathstroke forms his own version of Titans East, a team created explicitly to take down the Teen Titans. Though he is a powerful physical asset to the team, Match's presence is more of a psychological ploy, due to Superboy's death during the Infinite Crisis event. Match's mind and body have decayed, making him behave more like a normal Bizarro clone. Match is defeated when Wonder Girl reflects his heat-vision back at him with her bracelets, after which Jericho possesses his unconscious body.

Jericho, still trapped in Match's body, escapes from S.T.A.R. Labs in visible distress and asking for his friends' help. The Titans attempt to separate the two, only for Match to break free. When Jericho and Match are finally separated, it is revealed that it was Match who was panicked, and that Jericho, whose mind had been corrupted by the time spent trapped inside Match, was in control of his body.

Match is later tracked down and killed by Superboy-Prime, who gives his body to scientist Doctor Calligan. Calligan dissects Match's body and uses it to reverse engineer three clones. During the ensuing battle, Robin and Ravager destroy the clones with a Kryptonite blade.

=== Infinite Frontier ===
Following the events of Dark Nights: Death Metal, Match returns to mainstream continuity as a member of the Suicide Squad. Believing himself to be the real Superboy, he eventually encounters Superboy and battles him. Afterwards, Match's squad mate Nocturna shows Match the Agenda's underground lab, which contains dozens of Superboy clones. Match is shaken by this revelation, but continues to work with the Suicide Squad. Additionally, he is given medication that enables him to speak normally while leaving his appearance unaltered.

== Powers and abilities ==
Match have superpowers similar to Superboy, but with greater control. They include personal telekinesis, which can mimic Kryptonian powers and could be used to disassemble machinery. He can also vibrate his vocal cords to speak at different frequencies, which he demonstrated while secretly communicating with Bolt.

== Other versions ==
Match appears in Tiny Titans #25.

== In other media ==
- Match appears in Young Justice, voiced by Nolan North. This version is a fully Kryptonian clone of Superman who was created by Lex Luthor and Cadmus Labs as part of "Project Match" and conditioned to respond violently to the sight of the Superman logo. Due to the difficulties involved in replicating Kryptonian DNA, Match is mentally unstable, placed in cryogenic storage, and replaced by Superboy.
- Match appears in the Young Justice tie-in comic. As of these comics, he is severely deformed and paler and joined Onslaught.
- Match appears as a character summon in Scribblenauts Unmasked: A DC Comics Adventure.
