= Arrowette =

- Bonnie King debuts as Miss Arrowette in World's Finest Comics #113.

Publication information
- Publisher: DC Comics
- First appearance: Bonnie King: World's Finest Comics #113 (November 1960); Cissie King-Jones: Impulse #28 (August 1997)
- Created by: Bonnie King: Dave Wood; Lee Elias; Cissie King-Jones: Tom Peyer; Craig Rousseau

In-story information
- Alter ego: Bonnie King; Suzanne "Cissie" King-Jones
- Species: Human
- Team affiliations: Cissie King-Jones: Young Justice; Justice League
- Partnerships: Bonnie King: Oliver Queen; Roy Harper; Cissie King-Jones: Tim Drake; Cassie Sandsmark; Bart Allen; Conner Kent; Greta Hayes; Red Tornado; Anita Fite; Li'l Lobo/Slo-bo
- Abilities: Olympic-level archery skills; Highly skilled martial arts

Arrowette is the name of two characters appearing in American comic books published by DC Comics. The first, Bonnie King, is a supporting character of Green Arrow who unsuccessfully tried to become his sidekick. The second, Cissie King-Jones, is King's daughter and a member of Young Justice.

== Publication history ==
The Bonnie King version of Arrowette appears in World's Finest Comics #113 and was created by Dave Wood and Lee Elias.

The Cissie King-Jones version of Arrowette appears in Impulse #28 and was created by Tom Peyer and Craig Rousseau.

== Biography ==
=== Bonnie King ===
The first Arrowette (properly known as Miss Arrowette) is Bonnie King, a would-be sidekick and general nuisance to Green Arrow. She first appears in World's Finest Comics #113 (November 1960).

When Bonnie was a child, her mother Millie put her through archery training and was controlling of her progress. Bonnie competes in the Olympic Games, where she wins a bronze medal. Bonnie's mother is disappointed in her for her failure to win a gold medal. Bonnie intends to use her skills in archery to serve as Green Arrow's sidekick, but turns out to be too clumsy to become a hero. Arrowette briefly dates Green Arrow in his civilian identity of Oliver Queen.

The adult Bonnie King appears in Young Justice.

Bonnie meets Bernell Jones, a journalist who remembers her from her time in the Olympic Games and is probably the only person to consider her a star. She nicknames him Bowstring because he is as thin as one and takes him briefly as her sidekick so he will give her publicity in his journal. Eventually, however, Green Arrow convinces Arrowette to give up heroism.

Bonnie is forced to give up archery due to being busy with her job as a secretary and suffering from carpal tunnel syndrome. She talks Bernell into marrying her and, one year later, she has a daughter named Cissie. Five years later, Bernell dies from fish poisoning. Hal Jordan gives Bonnie and Cissie a beneficiary check, which allows Bonnie to train Cissie in athletics. Cissie is overworked between the many fields she is trained in and comes to resent her mother deeply.

=== Cissie King-Jones ===
Cissie King-Jones appears in her original Arrowette costume.

Forced by her mother to adopt a version of her old costume, Suzanne "Cissie" King-Jones becomes the second Arrowette. Arrowette first appears in the pages of Impulse wearing a frilly costume and a bejeweled mask that apes her mother's old costume. Despite Arrowette's success as a heroine, Impulse's mentor, Max Mercury, is concerned by what he sees as Bonnie's exploitation of her daughter. Child welfare services gets involved, and Bonnie loses custody of her daughter, who is sent to the Elias School for Girls, a boarding school.

Arrowette next appears in the series Young Justice, where she is injured by the villain Harm. She manages to escape and contact Young Justice, later joining the team along with Wonder Girl (Cassie Sandsmark) and Secret (Greta Hayes).

After her school therapist—one of the few adults whom Cissie trusted—is murdered, Cissie tracks down the killers in a violent rage. She nearly kills one of them herself, but is stopped by Superboy. Cissie is so shaken by the incident that she vows never to be Arrowette again.

Despite leaving the team, Cissie remains close friends with her teammates and eventually reconciles with her mother, who convinces her daughter to try out for the Summer Games in Sydney (a reference to the 2000 Summer Olympics). Cissie ends up taking home the gold and becomes something of a celebrity. Now retired from heroics, Cissie never expresses any desire to return to her life as a superhero, despite the best efforts of several of her former teammates.

Cissie temporarily rejoins Young Justice debuting a new red hooded costume as part of a roster of back-up members alongside Aqualad, Spoiler, and Sideways. During the Dark Crisis event, she reconnects with Cassie – who reveals her resentment at Cissie for abandoning the team and her friends – while Impulse, Superboy, and Robin are trapped by Mickey Mxyzptlk.

== Skills and abilities ==
Cissie is a normal human with above average strength, stamina and agility for a girl of her age. She has exceptional hand-to-hand combatant ability, being highly skilled in judo, jeet kune do, and kickboxing with skills as an Olympic gold-medalist longbow marksman and possesses above average intelligence.

== Other versions ==
- An alternate timeline version of Cissie King-Jones / Arrowette appears in the Flashpoint tie-in Wonder Woman and the Furies as a member of the Amazons' eponymous Furies.
- An alternate universe version of Arrowette named Cissie King-Hawke appears in The Multiversity: The Just #1. This version is the spoiled and popular daughter of Connor Hawke who wishes to start her own superhero team called the Just over her father's disapproval.

== In other media ==
The Cissie King-Jones incarnation of Arrowette appears in Young Justice, voiced by Kelly Stables. This version is a member of the Team.
