= Greta Hayes =

Greta Hayes may refer to:

- Secret (Greta Hayes), a superheroine in DC Comics
- Greta Hayes (field hockey) (born 1996), Australian field hockey player
