= Fifth-week event =

Novelty comic book promotion

A fifth week event is a novelty comic book promotion. Comic publishers in the United States schedule releases in four-week cycles, releasing on a particular day of the week (e.g., every Wednesday). In the event that a month has more than four weeks (i.e., a fifth Wednesday), publishers must find ways to fill in the scheduling gap. These may include works produced especially for the week or issues that supplement larger events.

The fifth week event is less common in an age of longer crossovers, such as Blackest Night, which run for months at a time and span multiple ongoing series. In the 21st century, fifth weeks are now more commonly used to publish one-shots, spotlight certain titles, or balance a company's release schedule.

== History ==
In the 1990s, DC Comics published four monthly Superman titles. The interlocking stories created a weekly narrative that continued throughout the year, but that publishing schedule accounted for only 48 out of the 52 weeks per year. With four months each year containing a fifth Wednesday, DC introduced a fifth Superman title, Superman: The Man of Tomorrow, to fill in the skip weeks.

The first skip week events were linked to a range of existing (or proposed) titles with a shared theme: New Year's Evil focused on villains and GirlFrenzy on female characters from the participating titles.

In the midst of the DC vs. Marvel crossover, the two companies created Amalgam Comics, a jointly-published line of comics where DC and Marvel heroes combined into new characters. DC also created its own alternate universe with in-name-only versions of their major characters under the Tangent Comics line.

Vertigo Comics, a DC imprint, released a number of comics in the fifth week of December 1999 under the title V2K, which dealt with the approach of the new century.

In the 21st century, the fifth week event remains a factor in DC's publishing plans, as they may be used to launch or conclude events, or release a one-shot, an annual, or a themed quarterly anthology. Marvel Comics uses fifth weeks to release more titles in a five-week month, or to release popular ongoing titles in those weeks to ensure regular customer attendance. Other publishers may use fifth weeks to place focus on a given series, release event tie-in issues, or provide breathing room to creators whose monthly titles are behind schedule in production.

== Examples ==
- DC Comics
  - New Year's Evil (late 1997, cover-dated 1998, 8 one-shots)
  - GirlFrenzy (1998, 7 one-shots)
  - Young Justice: The Secret (1998)
  - The Kingdom (late 1998, cover-dated 1999, follow-up to Kingdom Come)
  - Amalgam Comics (published with Marvel Comics)
  - Tangent Comics (1997, 9 one-shots; 1998, 9 one-shots)
  - The Justice Society Returns (1999)
  - Sins of Youth (2000)
  - Green Lantern: Circle of Fire (2000)
  - Silver Age (2000)
  - Justice League of ? (2001, alternate meanings of JLA such as Justice League of Aliens, Justice League of Amazons, etc.)
  - Power Surge (2002)
  - V2K (Vertigo, 1999)
- Marvel Comics
  - Marvel Knights 2099 (2004)
  - Marvel Mangaverse (2001)
  - What If? (2006, 7 one-shots)
  - X-Men: Black Sun (2000)
