= Young Justice =

DC Comics superhero team

- Textless cover of Young Justice (vol. 3) #1 (January 2019). Art by Patrick Gleason.

Group publication information
- Publisher: DC Comics
- First appearance: Young Justice: The Secret #1 (June 1998)
- Created by: Todd Dezago (writer); Todd Nauck (artist)

In-story information
- Base(s): Justice League Cave; Catskill Mountain Hotel
- Member(s): Robin; Superboy; Impulse; Wonder Girl; Teen Lantern; Jinny Hex; Amethyst Previous members: Red Tornado (mentor); Arrowette; Secret; Empress; Li'l Lobo/Slobo; The Ray; Captain Marvel Jr.

Young Justice
- : Cover of the first issue of the ongoing series. Art by Todd Nauck.

Series publication information
- Schedule: Monthly
- Format: Ongoing series
- Genre: Superhero
- Publication date: (vol. 1); July 1998 – March 2003 (vol. 2); February 2011 – February 2013 (vol. 3); January 2019 – November 2020
- Number of issues: (vol. 1): 56 (including issue #1,000,000) (vol. 2): 28 (including issue #0, and 2 issues of Outsiders continuation) (vol. 3): 20

Creative team
- Writer(s): (vol. 1); Peter David (vol. 2); Greg Weisman, Kevin Hopps, Art Baltazar, Franco Aureliani (vol. 3); Brian Michael Bendis, David F Walker
- Penciller(s): (vol. 1); Todd Nauck (vol. 2); Mike Norton, Christopher Jones (vol. 3); Patrick Gleason, John Timms, Scott Godlewski
- Creator(s): Todd Dezago (writer); Todd Nauck (artist)

Young Justice is a superhero team consisting of teenage heroes appearing in American comic books published by DC Comics. The team was formed in 1998 when DC's usual teen hero group, the Teen Titans, had become adults and changed their name to the Titans. Like the original Teen Titans, Young Justice was centered on three previously established teen heroes: Superboy (Conner Kent aka Kon-El), Robin (Tim Drake), and Impulse, but grew to encompass most teenaged heroes in the DC Universe.

In the 2003 mini-series Titans/Young Justice: Graduation Day, both groups disbanded and members of each formed two new teams of Teen Titans and Outsiders.

The series was revived in 2019 under the Wonder Comics imprint for teen readers, reuniting most of the original core cast.

== Fictional history ==
Young Justice (circa 1998 - 2003). Promotional lithograph by Todd Nauck.

Robin, Superboy, and Impulse first join in a one-shot, part of the "GirlFrenzy" Fifth week event, called Young Justice: The Secret, written by Todd DeZago, where they first encounter the mysterious superheroine Secret and free her from captivity of the Department of Extranormal Operations. They next appear together in the Justice League miniseries, World Without Grown-Ups, also written by DeZago, in which a magical being, commanded by new child villain Bedlam, moves all adults to an alternate world. This is when they first stumble upon the abandoned Justice League Cave in Happy Harbor (formerly called "The Secret Sanctuary"), which would later become their headquarters, re-christened the "Justice Cave". After managing to thwart Bedlam's adolescent paradise, the three boys agree that they were effective as a team and should officially band together as their own group.

When the ongoing title, written by Peter David, begins in September 1998, the three heroes have formed a clubhouse in the Cave. However, in the first issue, they awaken the android superhero Red Tornado from a self-imposed dormancy; Red Tornado would remain a supporting character in the title, acting as a mentor/chaperone to the founding team, feeling that his interaction with the boisterous teens will help salvage what he felt was left of his humanity. In issue 4, the group doubles in number with the addition of three teen superheroines: the second Wonder Girl (Cassandra Sandsmark), struggling to make her mark as a serious crimefighter, the ethereal and mysterious Secret (Greta Hayes, but nicknamed "Suzie" throughout most of the series), and Arrowette (Cissie King-Jones), attempting to humiliate her estranged domineering mother, the retired Miss Arrowette, by outshining her own brief super-heroic career. The stern and calculating Robin and the cocky and brazen Superboy occasionally compete for leadership; Robin is the one most commonly deferred to, though routinely teased by the others for what they consider his over-pragmatic nature, initially refusing to share his face or his true identity with any of them; a slightly jealous Wonder Girl overcomes her initial distaste for Arrowette and the two quickly become close friends; Wonder Girl's schoolgirl crush on Superboy slowly begins to develop into genuine feelings shared between the two of them for one another; the team as a whole usually find the ability to trust in Impulse in spite of his whimsical character, yielding mixed results in various adventures; Secret, amnesiac to her true identity and history, is accepted for her innocent nature and forms a kinship with Wonder Girl and Arrowette, and later on in the series she develops a crush on Robin.

In their earliest adventures, the team mostly faced threats of varying severity; from the Mighty Endowed, an archaeologist named Nina Dowd ("N. Dowd") who was transformed into a top-heavy feline figure too well endowed to support her own weight, to the deadly Harm. This man was an aspiring super-villain bent on battling and killing young metahumans for "practice". Harm is later revealed to be William Hayes, Greta Hayes' adopted brother, who was responsible for her death and transformation into a spirit. Young Justice discovers and "adopts" the Super-Cycle, a sentient flying vehicle from New Genesis which they come to rely as their primary means of transportation. They are also persistently badgered by APES (All Purpose Enforcement Squad) Agents Donald Fite and Ishido Maad (loosely coined as "Fite n' Maad"). These men are acting on behalf of the Department of Extranormal Operations. They are seeking to recapture Secret; instead she leads a revolt that frees all of their other captives.

Red Tornado faces losing custody of his adoptive daughter, Traya. He flees the state with her, placing the team in a legal predicament because they assisted him. Traya is eventually returned to her mother after she is awakened from her coma by Secret, while Red Tornado is temporarily impounded. Arrowette suffers the murder of a close friend at her school and nearly kills the attacker. This places the team in further trouble with the government. It helps stir an already-ensuing media blitz aimed at all young super-heroes turning public sway towards the opinion that all teenage heroes are too reckless and more of an endangerment to society than a protection. This situation is further exacerbated when Young Justice, in an attempt to free Secret who had been taken captive by the DEO, inadvertently defaces Mount Rushmore. These events quickly give rise to building tensions between Young Justice and their adult counterparts in the Justice League, and a rising amount of petitioning in Washington against "underage" crime-fighters, spurred by the newly formed team of Golden Age sidekicks, Old Justice. Remorseful over her lack of restraint, and feeling burnt-out on a life that was mostly forced on her by her mother in the first place, Cissie retires as Arrowette and quits the team in the midst of these events, much to the dismay of her best friend Wonder Girl (who would go on to continually pester Cissie for some time later about rejoining the team). In the midst of these events, unbeknownst to the team, Superboy is taken captive and detained by the villainous Agenda, while his villainous counterpart, Match, is implanted within the team. Shortly after, they meet and are aided by a mysterious new heroine, Empress. She is later revealed to be Anita Fite, daughter of Donald Fite, one of the agents who had previously plagued the team up through this point. The team soon becomes targeted by a federally-operated group of metahumans known as the Pointmen, and is forced to flee their headquarters in Happy Harbor, now officially wanted by the government.

=== Sins of Youth ===
These developments spin off into one of the series' key events, Young Justice: Sins of Youth fifth week event in March 2000 (takes place between Young Justice issues #19 and 20), as the team's troubles come to a head when all members of Young Justice, the Justice League, the Justice Society, the Titans, and several other costumed heroes are, in a catastrophic chain of events involving Klarion the Witch Boy, are either aged to adulthood or de-aged to adolescence, thanks to the machinations of the Agenda, headed by former wife of Lex Luthor, Contessa Erica Alexandra Del Portenza, who had been manipulating events from the beginning in an attempt to discredit all costumed super-heroes, young and old alike, by targeting Young Justice and the teen heroes as the weakest link in the chain. During this crisis, as the heroes scatter to find a reversal to Klarion's magic, the DCU is given a glimpse of the quality of heroism that may one day arise from its youngest generation of super-heroes (much to the surprise of many within the super-heroic community, as well as a few members of Young Justice themselves), as well as a glimpse of its senior generations in their teen years or younger. Also during the event, or as indirect results of the event, Superboy's girlfriend Tana Moon is murdered by an agent of the Agenda, marking a turning point in his life, Wonder Girl began to bloom into her role as a hero, even abandoning her wig. Jack Knight (Starman), impressed with the competence and intelligence he witnessed in the then-adult Courtney Whitmore, the second Star-Spangled Kid, would later pass his Cosmic Rod and the Starman mantle on to Courtney, spurring the precocious heroine to later become Stargirl. It also marked the transition between the original six and the new cast, with Empress joining right after this storyline and a newly de-aged Lobo, or Li'l Lobo, being created by it.

In the aftermath of these events, negative public opinion against the young crime-fighters subsides, and the team reconciles with their friends and mentors in the Justice League and with the government. Superboy temporarily loses his powers, but regains his ability to age normally (as a result from an earlier story arc in his own title, Conner was permanently suspended in age as a 16-year-old). The team re-locates its headquarters to an abandoned hotel in the Catskills and takes a temporary leave of absence to recuperate, allowing for a substitute team consisting of Beast Boy, Flamebird, Batgirl, Captain Marvel Jr., and Lagoon Boy to fill in for one issue, as they intervene in a battle royale between Klarion and Li'l Lobo.

When Cissie is selected to represent the United States in the archery games for the 2000 Summer Olympics at the encouragement of her mother, the team accompanies her to Australia and thwarts an effort to sabotage the games by the criminal nation of Zandia. Cissie, a natural-born marksman, wins the gold medal for the US, effectively gaining her celebrity status without the need of her heroic identity. They team up once again with Empress, finally learning her true identity, much to Anita's chagrin. Young Justice quickly warms up to the young mystic and welcomes her within their ranks, though Cissie initially rejects Anita out of resentment towards feeling replaced.

The team later make an expedition to outer space at the behest of Doiby Dickles, former sidekick to Alan Scott, and former member of Old Justice, to free his previous homeworld Myrg from invading forces. In this adventure they encounter Li'l Lobo once again, who agrees to join them for the expectation of violence. Robin begrudgingly allows Young Justice to accept Lobo's help in this instance, primarily out of a desire for any chance of evening their odds for success. After liberating Myrg and returning home (after yet another brief excursion to New Genesis, in which Secret meets and unwittingly strikes up a rapport with the despotic Darkseid), Lobo continues to exercise his presence with Young Justice and participating in their adventures for no real reason that anyone within the group can discern; he is never officially accepted as a member. He develops an attraction for Empress; a mildly interested but mostly apathetic Anita obliges to go on a date with him at one point.

=== Our Worlds at War ===
During 2001's "Our Worlds at War" storyline, the universe is faced with the dual threat of impending annihilation at the hands of Imperiex and conquest/enslavement at the hands of Brainiac 13. Many tenuous alliances are formed, particularly between then-US President Lex Luthor and the Justice League, not to mention Earth and the dark world Apokolips. In the midst of intergalactic war, Young Justice is drafted into the combat strictly for search and rescue purposes. As a result of the aftermath of the JLA: Tower of Babel storyline, in which Batman had been revealed to be keeping extensive and invasive dossiers on his teammates in the Justice League for purposes of neutralizing and subduing in the event of any of them going rogue, similar suspicions of Robin had begun to circulate amongst his teammates in Young Justice. When the team crash lands and is left stranded on Apokolips after Superboy took control of their shuttle in an attempt to rescue Steel from the Black Racer, tensions explode between Superboy and Robin and those suspicions are brought to light, leaving the team divided; Superboy, Wonder Girl, Impulse, and Cissie all express concerns regarding whether Robin is capable of doing the same thing to them, but Secret reaffirms her faith in Robin while Empress acknowledges Batman's reasons for developing the strategies, with Lobo dismissing it as impossible for anyone to take him out so he does not care. The group agree to put the matter aside for the time being as they attempt to get off of Apokolips.

The team quickly begins drawing enemy fire; Impulse is left shaken and temporarily traumatized when one of his super-speed "scouts" (vibrational "clones" Impulse learned to make of himself that could function independently for short time periods) is killed in the line of fire, giving the lackadaisical hero a harsh confrontation with his own mortality; Li'l Lobo is all but annihilated by Parademons, ultimately finished off by the Black Racer. The rest of the team is taken captive and put into the care of Granny Goodness, where she and her Female Furies subject them to various cruel forms of mental torture. Secret is taken to confer with Darkseid, who had taken an interest in the powerful, yet naive young heroine the last time they had met. Secret, who had recently begun to learn more about her powers and her connections with the afterlife and who had consequently began to ponder her true nature, is informed by Darkseid that she is "evil." Young Justice eventually breaks free from Granny's captivity and lashes out at their tormentors before making another desperate attempt at escape. Due to Li'l Lobo's ability to replicate clones of himself for every drop of his blood spilled, the team is aided by an army of Lobo clones who are unleashed on the Apokoliptian forces, as they lash out against everyone and everything around them before turning on each other and killing one another off to the last surviving Lobo. The team finally makes good their escape from Apokolips in the midst of the chaos, with the help of one additional genetically inferior teenage Lobo that had remained hidden from the fight in their spaceship. Ashamed of his perceived inferiority and cowardice, this less imposing, less threatening Lobo renames himself "Slo-Bo." The team, who had been listed as missing in action for some time finally return to Earth safely a few days after the Imperiex War had finally ended, collectively and individually jarred by their wartime experience.

In the aftermath of this adventure, for the first time frightened for his life, Impulse decides to quit the team, retiring from his super-hero life altogether. He is joined by Robin, who decides to sever ties with the team out of hurt feelings inflicted by teammates that he feels no longer trust him. After the loss of two founding members, they are joined by former Justice League mascot Snapper Carr, who agrees to assume Red Tornado's mentoring position; with his own unique form of counsel, Snapper attempts to help the remaining members get their feet back on the ground. To re-bolster their ranks, the team soon recruits the older Ray as its newest member. Meanwhile, in an effort to help Secret come to terms with her tragic past and assuage her concerns over what she considers her "true nature", Snapper arranges for Suzie to be taken in by the Spectre (Hal Jordan) in a mentoring capacity. The full details of her life and death are brought to light, as well as her role as a "gatekeeper" between the realm of the dead and the living. She is never shown divulging the information of her origin to her teammates, though she does supply them with her true name, Greta Hayes.

=== World Without Young Justice ===
All four series featuring Young Justice characters take part in the "World Without Young Justice" crossover in April 2002. The five-part story arc features old Young Justice opponent Bedlam from "World Without Grown-Ups" returning and once again recreating the world to suit his will. In this new reality, Young Justice consists of distorted, and in some cases amoral, parodies of their proper selves. Reunited with Bart Allen and Tim Drake, Young Justice manages to defeat Bedlam once again and restore reality to its rightful state.

With Young Justice once again in full force, the team decides to take a vote on who should become team leader, due to the feeling that despite Robin's return, they question whether or not he deserves the position of leader, particularly in light of having quit the team so abruptly. In the end, Wonder Girl, having blossomed into a competent, level-headed heroine since her more awkward days hiding under her wig and goggles, and also having stuck with the team through thick and thin since close to its beginning, wins the election, and is given full blessings from former leader, Robin. Though Robin loses his leadership position, he continues to act as the team's chief tactical mind, similar to Batman's role with the JLA.

Wonder Girl assumes responsibility just in time to lead Young Justice to its next challenge. When Empress's father is kidnapped and murdered by her super-villain grandfather, Agua Sin Gaaz, a prominent and powerful resident of the nation of Zandia, populated primarily with criminals, Young Justice assembles a legion of young heroes from across the DCU to assist in Gaaz's apprehension, including Stargirl, Jakeem Thunder, Lagoon Boy, Kid Devil, the Wonder Twins, and dozens of others. The assault on Zandia is met with an equally staggering assemblage of villains, resulting in an all-out battle royale. Empress confronts Gaaz, but the villain is defeated and murdered by Arrowette's mother, Bonnie King-Jones, who had been posnig as her. After Gaaz's demise, Empress is left to care for her parents, who were reincarnated as infants in Gaaz's laboratory.

The final storyline of the series witnesses the building subplot of Secret's dark side coming to light. As Young Justice prepares to boost its image and expand by agreeing to star in a new reality show, Secret learns that her father is to soon be sentenced to death for the murder of her brother, Harm. She pleas for her teammates help in breaking him out of jail. When they refuse and later condemn her after freeing her father anyway, a betrayed Secret erupts in a fit of anger, violently attacks her friends, and agrees to leave Earth for Apokolips with Darkseid, at last giving in to his offer of tutelage. With Secret now in service to one of humanity's greatest adversaries, and now in control of the power linking her to the abyss, the team apprehensively prepares to face their former friend. Impulse confesses his fear over his own lack of regard for his own life; Empress, now left to care for two newborn infants faces the possibility that her career as a super-hero may be over; Slo-Bo, with his physically inferior body, is slowly beginning to degrade; Cissie at last establishes peace with her mother; and Superboy and Wonder Girl finally confess their feelings for one another. When Secret finally attacks in a final confrontation condemning her friends for failing her, Robin admits their failings and appeals to Secret's reason and inner goodness. Upon breaking down in tears and giving up the people she had previously consumed, Secret is confronted and scorned by an angered Darkseid. Slo-Bo attempts to attack Darkseid, but is seemingly obliterated. Darkseid then strips Secret of her powers as punishment for her betrayal. The last page reveals that Slo-Bo was transported to the headquarters of the 853rd century Young Justice, petrified but left conscious.

=== Graduation Day ===
The team is next seen in the Titans/Young Justice: Graduation Day mini-series. A casual business meeting with a potential money source and the Titans goes awry when the two teams are attacked by the android Indigo, leaving Empress, Argent, Cyborg, and Jesse Quick hospitalized. Indigo activates a dormant Superman android that had been left in the care of S.T.A.R. Labs. The Superman android turns out to be hostile, and the resulting clash leads to the deaths of long-time Titans Lilith Clay and Donna Troy (who, unknown to the Titans and Young Justice, was resurrected by the Titans of Myth), leaving both teams devastated. Wonder Girl, enraged at being unable to save either of them and particularly saddened by the loss of her friend and predecessor, has come to see herself and Young Justice ineffective as heroes, and turns away from her teammates. Young Justice finally dissolves. The kids, choosing to shoulder the weight of the responsibility for the fiasco, drop out of communication with one another until Wonder Girl, Robin, Superboy, and Impulse are brought back together by Cyborg, Starfire, and Beast Boy to form the new Teen Titans.

Meanwhile, Ray joins the new Freedom Fighters, while Snapper Carr joins Checkmate. Greta Hayes attends school with Cissie and Wonder Girl. Empress also goes into semi-retirement but would occasionally re-don her costume during the Infinite Crisis, and during a brief team-up with Supergirl. She apparently came out of retirement in Final Crisis, joining Más y Menos and Sparx in forming a Teen Titans spin-off known as the "League of Titans". The League is easily defeated by Mirror Master and Arthur Light, and are last seen recuperating at the Hall of Justice. Red Tornado meanwhile later rejoins the Justice League. After over a year of inactivity, Lagoon Boy is recruited by Cyborg for his new Titans East roster, only to be severely injured and rendered comatose on the team's first training exercise. The Super-Cycle meanwhile has disappeared without a trace.

A short Young Justice story is added into Teen Titans #50, where Wonder Girl and Robin remembering their old Young Justice days, and in particular the recently deceased Bart Allen. The pair would share stories about how Bart would impulsively make mistakes such as causing an international incident in Gorilla City, failing to realize his teammates were badly-made robots and publishing the team's secret identities in a Young Justice comic book.

=== Unofficial reunions ===
In the Wonder Girl mini series, the then living remaining core members of Young Justice, consisting of Wonder Girl, Robin, Empress, and Arrowette, along with Hercules, teamed up to defeat Granny Goodness and her Female Furies.

In the first six issues of Adventure Comics (collected in Superboy: The Boy of Steel), Wonder Girl, Red Robin (Tim Drake), and Kid Flash come together in Smallville to offer Superboy support after an incident with Lex Luthor.

=== Wonder Comics ===
In the years following DC's The New 52 and DC Rebirth soft reboots, a new Young Justice series was launched in January 2019 as part of DC's teen-oriented Wonder Comics imprint, written by the imprint's curator Brian Michael Bendis. The first story arc featured the reunion of original team members Robin (Tim Drake), Superboy (Conner Kent), Wonder Girl (Cassie Sandsmark) and Impulse (Bart Allen). They were joined by new team members Teen Lantern (Keli Quintela), a young girl who managed to hack a Green Lantern Corps power battery; Jinny Hex, the descendant of Jonah Hex; and Amethyst, Princess of Gemworld. This series saw the reintroduction of the pre-New-52 Conner Kent and Bart Allen to the main DC continuity.

The team initially came together in Metropolis, when responding to an incursion from the forces of Dark Opal from Gemworld. Being drawn into Gemworld after the retreating invaders, the team were reunited with Superboy – who had been marooned on Gemworld for some time, and so had been unaffected by the cosmic reboots that had altered continuity since his last appearance – and introduced to Amethyst. After defeating the Dark Lord Opal, the team were set adrift in the multiverse and travelled through a variety of alternate realities in their attempt to get home. While on Earth-Three, on Impulse's encouragement Robin took up the new codename Drake.

Upon returning to their home reality, the team encountered Naomi McDuffie, main character of the Wonder Comics series Naomi. Soon afterwards, Superboy was again sent to an alternate reality by the villainous S.T.A.R. Labs scientists who had initially sent him to Gemworld, this time ending up on Skartaris. In their effort to find out what happened to him, Young Justice teamed up with Naomi, along with the Wonder Twins and Miguel and Summer Pickens from Dial H for Hero (both series also under the Wonder Comics imprint).

David F Walker became co-writer of the series as of issue #13. More allies were recruited for the mission to recover Superboy, including Spoiler, Aqualad (Jackson Hyde), Sideways, and original team member Arrowette. After the defeat of the S.T.A.R. Labs scientists and Superboy's return, the team decided to accept all their allies on the mission as new members, transforming Young Justice from a self-contained team into a broadly-connected network of young superheroes.

== All-ages series ==
The cover to issue #0 of the all-ages Young Justice title. Art by Mike Norton.

A second, unrelated Young Justice title was launched by DC in 2011, set within the continuity of the Young Justice animated series. The series was part of DC's kid-friendly all-ages line, which also included comics based on other popular series such as Batman: The Brave and the Bold and Ben 10. Issue #0 was written by TV series writers Greg Weisman and Kevin Hopps. Issues 1–6 and the 2011 Free Comic Book Day Special were written by Art Baltazar and Franco Aureliani. As of issue #7 TV series writers Greg Weisman and Kevin Hopps resumed writing the series. Mike Norton provided the art for issues 0–4 and the 2011 Free Comic Book Day Special, while Christopher Jones became the new artist as of issue #5. The series concluded with issue #25, less than one month before the animated series' apparent cancellation.

The series featured a team consisting of teen superheroes Superboy, Aqualad, Artemis, Robin, Miss Martian and Kid Flash. Issues #0-19 were set during the events of the first season of the animated series, with stories taking place between episodes. The final six-part story arc "Invasion", published over issues #20-25, was set one month before the beginning of the second season.

Issues #5 and #6 of the title feature the kids on a camping trip in homage to issue #7 of the original series, which featured a similar storyline.

In advance of the animated series returning for its third season after a six-year hiatus, the comic was also revived for a one-shot story titled "Torch Songs" intended to lead into the new season's first episode. The story was ultimately released digitally in two chapters, over the two days preceding the third-season premiere. Weisman returned as writer and Jones as artist.

== In other media ==
- On November 26, 2010, the Young Justice animated television series pilot premiered in the United States on Cartoon Network. Despite its title, the show is not an adaptation of the Young Justice series of comics, but rather, an adaptation of the entire DC Universe with a focus on young superheroes. The television series is based on a concept of a cross between Teen Titans and Young Justice, rather than a direct adaptation of one of them. It draws influences from the 1960s Teen Titans run and the 1990s Young Justice run, in addition to subsequent comics. The line-up includes the Conner Kent incarnation of Superboy, the Dick Grayson incarnation of Robin, the Wally West incarnation of Kid Flash, Miss Martian, Artemis, and a newly created version of Aqualad (Kaldur'ahm). Other members join and make appearances on an intermittent or permanent basis. On April 25, 2017, Warner Brothers announced that the third season would be titled Young Justice: Outsiders.
- The animated series incarnation of Young Justice appears in the Teen Titans Go! episode "Let's Get Serious".

== Awards ==
The 1,000,000 issue of the series was a part of the "DC One Million" storyline, which was a top votegetter for the Comics Buyer's Guide Fan Award for Favorite Story for 1999. Said story involved Justice Legion T, an 853rd Century trio of young heroes: Robin the Toy Wonder (a robotic Robin), Superboy OMAC (One Millionth Actual Clone, a play on the classic OMAC character) and Impulse (a Speed Force-influenced energy being, presumably either personified by the spirits of previous persons who used the heroic name, or else the living embodiment of random thoughts lost in the Speed Force, but most probably a time misplaced Scout of the original Impulse).

== Collected editions ==
Title	Contents	Publication Date	ISBN
Original series
Young Justice: A League of their Own	Young Justice #1–7, Young Justice Secret Files #1	September 2000	ISBN 9781563896262
Young Justice: Sins of Youth	Young Justice: Sins of Youth #1–2, Young Justice: Sins of Youth Secret Files #1, Superboy Vol. 4 #74, Sins of Youth: Batboy & Robin #1, Sins of Youth: Lagoon Man & Aqualad #1, Sins of Youth: JLA, Jr. #1, Sins of Youth: Kid Flash & Impulse #1, Sins of Youth: Starwoman & JSA, Jr. #1, Sins of Youth: Superman Jr./Superboy, Sr. #1, Sins of Youth: Wonder Girls #1, Sins of Youth: Secret & Deadboy #1	November 2000	ISBN 9781563897481
Young Justice Book One	Young Justice #1–7, #1,000,000, JLA: World Without Grown-ups #1–2, Secret Origins 80-Page Giant #1, Young Justice: The Secret #1, Young Justice: Secret Files #1.	May 2017	ISBN 9781401271169
Young Justice Book Two	Young Justice #8–17, Young Justice 80-Page Giant #1, Young Justice in No Man's Land #1, Supergirl #36–37; bonus material from Young Justice Secret Files #1.	February 2018	ISBN 9781401277666
Young Justice Book Three	Young Justice #18-19, Young Justice: Sins of Youth #1-2, Young Justice: Sins of Youth Secret Files #1, Superboy Vol. 4 #74, Sins of Youth: JLA Jr. #1, Sins of Youth: Aquaboy/Lagoon Man #1, Sins of Youth: Batboy and Robin #1, Sins of Youth: Kid Flash/Impulse #1, Sins of Youth: Starwoman and the JSA Jr. #1, Sins of Youth: Superman Jr./Superboy Sr. #1, Sins of Youth: Wonder Girls #1, Sins of Youth: The Secret/Deadboy #1.	December 2018	ISBN 9781401285104
Young Justice Book Four	Young Justice #20-32	December 2019	ISBN 9781401295004
Young Justice Book Five	Young Justice #33-43, Young Justice: Our Worlds At War #1; material from Impulse #77, Superboy Vol. 4 #91	October 2020	ISBN 9781779502216
Young Justice Book Six	Young Justice #44-55, Impulse #85, Robin Vol. 2 #101, Superboy Vol. 4 #99	November 2022	ISBN 9781779517227
Young Justice Omnibus Vol. 1	Collects Young Justice #1-19; Young Justice #1,000,000; JLA: World Without Grown-Ups #1-2; Young Justice: The Secret #1; Young Justice Secret Files #1; Secret Origins 80-Page Giant #1; Young Justice in No Man's Land #1; Supergirl #36-37; Superboy Vol. 4 #74; Young Justice: Sins of Youth #1-2; Sins of Youth Secret Files #1; Sins of Youth: JLA Jr. #1; Sins of Youth: Aquaboy/Lagoon Man #1; Sins of Youth: Batboy and Robin #1; Sins of Youth: Kid Flash/Impulse #1; Sins of Youth: Starwoman and the JSA #1; Sins of Youth: Superman Jr./Superboy Sr. #1; Sins of Youth: Wonder Girls #1; and Sins of Youth: The Secret/Deadboy #1.	August 2023	ISBN 1779526032
All-ages series (Earth-16)
Young Justice	Young Justice Vol. 2 #0-6	January 2012	ISBN 978-1401233570
Young Justice: Training Day	Young Justice Vol. 2 #7-13	November 2012	ISBN 978-1401237486
Young Justice: Creature Features	Young Justice Vol. 2 #14-19	February 2013	ISBN 978-1401238544
Young Justice: Invasion	Young Justice Vol. 2 #20-25	December 2013	ISBN 978-1401242886
Young Justice: The Animated Series Vol. 1: The Early Missions	Young Justice Vol. 2 #0-13, Young Justice/Batman: The Brave and the Bold Super Sampler #1	October 2019	ISBN 978-1779501417
Wonder Comics series
Young Justice Vol. 1: Gemworld	Young Justice Vol. 3 #1-6	Hardcover: October 2019; Softcover: May 2020	Hardcover: ISBN 9781401292539; Softcover: ISBN 9781401299972
Young Justice Vol. 2: Lost in the Multiverse	Young Justice Vol. 3 #7-12	Hardcover: June 2020; Softcover: December 2020	Hardcover: ISBN 9781779500380; Softcover: ISBN 9781779504579
Young Justice Vol. 3: Warriors and Warlords	Young Justice Vol. 3 #13-20	January 2021	ISBN 9781779504586

Additionally, selected Young Justice comics were reprinted as part of the "DC Comics Presents: Young Justice" series. Each issue was square-bound with approximately 100 pages each, in the "100-Page Spectacular" format.

- DC Comics Presents: Young Justice #1 (published October 2010): collects JLA: World Without Grown-Ups #1–2
- DC Comics Presents: Young Justice #2 (published November 2010): collects Young Justice Secret Files and Origins #1, Young Justice in No Man's Land, and Young Justice: The Secret.
- DC Comics Presents: Young Justice #3 (published December 2010): collects Secret Origins 80-Page Giant #1, Young Justice #7
