= Rex Leech =

- Rex Leech as depicted in Superboy (vol. 4) #12 (February 1995). Art by Tom Grummett (penciler), Doug Hazlewood (inker), and Tom McCraw (colorist).

Publication information
- Publisher: DC Comics
- First appearance: Superman: The Man of Steel #20 (February 1993)
- Created by: Karl Kesel; Tom Grummett; Doug Hazlewood

In-story information
- Alter ego: Rex Leech
- Supporting character of: Superboy

Rex Leech is a fictional character in the DC Comics universe. He first appeared in Superman: The Man of Steel #20 in July 1993 and for a time was a regular supporting character in the Superboy line of comics.

== Fictional character biography ==
Rex Leech is introduced in the aftermath of "The Death of Superman" event. During Superman's funeral procession, Leech attempts to buy the rights to Jimmy Olsen's picture of Superman dead. Jimmy punches Leech in the face. Leech has his goons threaten to shoot Jimmy in the knees before Robin stops the incident.

Vincent Edge of WGBS uses Leech to recruit a supervillain for the new Superboy to fight, with Edge intending to gain a higher rating on his television station. In exchange, Leech becomes Superboy's sole representative. Superboy is reluctant to hire Leech as his manager, having already been offered a deal by Lex Luthor, until he meets Leech's daughter Roxy, who falls in love with him. Leech manages to secure the exclusive rights to Superman's name and symbol in exchange for half of all profits from merchandising being given to charity.

Leech pushes Superboy's merchandising as far as he could, even attempting to create an animated series based on him. Leech uses most of his money on bad investments, leaving him unable to pay back Mr. Gamboni, whom he owes a large sum. Gamboni sends Copperhead after Leech, but Superboy manages to save both Leech and Roxy.

== Powers and abilities ==
Rex Leech is a shrewd businessman and a fast-talker. His talents lie in the areas of entertainment management, cross-promotion, and copyright law.
