= Secret (Greta Hayes) =

Superhero in DC Comics

- Secret as depicted in Young Justice Secret Files & Origins #1 (January 1999). Art by Todd Nauck.

Publication information
- Publisher: DC Comics
- First appearance: Young Justice: The Secret #1 (June 1998)
- Created by: Todd Dezago (writer); Todd Nauck (artist)

In-story information
- Alter ego: Greta Hayes
- Species: Ghost (current); Human (former)
- Team affiliations: Young Justice
- Abilities: Flight; Teleportation; Intangibility; Possession; Shapeshifting

Secret (Greta Hayes) is a character appearing in American comic books published by DC Comics. Created by writer Todd Dezago and artist Todd Nauck, she was introduced in 1998 as a ghostly member of Young Justice who had no memory of her previous life. It is later revealed that Secret is the adoptive sister of Billy Hayes, who murdered her and became the supervillain Harm. Near the end of the Young Justice series in 2003, Secret is manipulated into serving Darkseid, who later resurrects her and removes her powers. After years of absence, Secret returns in the 2023 miniseries Stargirl: The Lost Children, where she is depicted as a Golden Age hero and sidekick of the Spectre.

Secret has made limited appearances in media outside comics, with Masasa Moyo voicing her in the animated series Young Justice.

== Fictional character biography ==
Secret first appeared in a one-shot comic, part of the Girlfrenzy fifth-week event, by Todd Dezago and Todd Nauck called Young Justice: The Secret, in which Robin, Impulse, and Superboy helped her to escape from agents of the Department of Extranormal Operations who were holding her captive.

Secret joins Young Justice along with Wonder Girl and Arrowette. She is often referred to as "Suzie" because her real name was unknown at the time. It is later revealed that Secret was once an ordinary girl named Greta who was killed by her adoptive brother Billy Hayes. Because of the manner of her death, Greta remained on the mortal plane, acting as a gateway between the living and the dead.

Secret eventually gave in to the darkness in her nature at the behest of Darkseid, whom she mistakenly called 'Doug Side'. In the last issue of Young Justice, Darkseid revives Secret as a powerless human. Finally having a life of her own, she attends the Elias School for Girls with Wonder Girl and Arrowette.

In "The New Golden Age" storyline, Secret is reimagined as the former sidekick of the Spectre who was captured by Childminder, a bird-like entity, and held on Orphan Island. After Childminder is defeated and regressed into an egg, Secret is among the Lost Children who Hourman brings to the present day, as allowing them to return to their native time period would cause a time paradox.

== Powers and abilities ==
As a ghost, Secret can fly, teleport, shapeshift, become ethereal, possess any sentient beings, and take souls to the "other side".

== In other media ==
- Secret appears in the Young Justice (2010) episode "Secrets", voiced by Masasa Moyo.
- Secret appears as a character summon in Scribblenauts Unmasked: A DC Comics Adventure.
- An alternate universe version of Secret makes a cameo appearance in Teen Titans Go! #48.
