= Wonder Girl (Cassie Sandsmark) =

Superhero

- Cassie Sandsmark on the variant cover of Wonder Woman (vol. 6) #13 (December 2024). Art by Stanley 'Artgerm' Lau Card.

Publication information
- Publisher: DC Comics
- First appearance: Wonder Woman (vol. 2) #105 (January 1996)
- Created by: John Byrne (writer & artist)

In-story information
- Alter ego: Cassandra "Cassie" Sandsmark
- Species: Human-Olympian Demigoddess
- Team affiliations: Teen Titans; Young Justice
- Partnerships: Wonder Woman
- Notable aliases: Wonder Girl
- Abilities: See list: Superhuman strength, speed, longevity, agility, stamina, and durability; Highly skilled hand-to-hand combatant; Accelerated healing; Flight; Immortality; Enhanced senses; Force field creation via armor; Utilizes Lasso of Lightning and indestructible bracelets; Multilingualism

Cassandra "Cassie" Sandsmark, one of the three characters known as Wonder Girl, is a superheroine appearing in American comic books published by DC Comics. She was created by John Byrne and first appeared in Wonder Woman (vol. 2) #105 (January 1996). The second Wonder Girl, Cassie is a sidekick of the superheroine Wonder Woman and has been featured as a member of the Teen Titans.

When Cassie was introduced, she was the daughter of an archaeologist, Dr. Helena Sandsmark, a friend of Wonder Woman's. To help Wonder Woman during an adventure, she borrowed magical artifacts which bestowed upon Cassie superpowers, with which she fought crime as Wonder Girl. Later, Zeus, king of the Greek gods, grants her real powers. Later revelations showed that Cassie was in fact a demigoddess and the daughter of Zeus and Dr. Sandsmark. Following the 2011 storyline Flashpoint, which rebooted DC's main comics universe, the newly-established New 52/Post-Flashpoint continuity retroactively changed Cassie's father from Zeus to a British demigod named Lennox, with Zeus being Lennox's father instead and now Cassie's grandfather.

== Publication history ==
Cassandra Sandsmark initially appears as a supporting cast member in Wonder Woman. She later appears as part of an ensemble in Young Justice and Teen Titans. She appeared in supporting roles in 52, Supergirl, and the 2006 relaunch of the Wonder Woman series. In September 2007, she appeared in the six-issue limited series Wonder Girl: Champion written by J. Torres and illustrated by Sanford Greene and Nathan Massengill.

== Fictional character biography ==
Cassie spent most of her time at her mother's place of work, the Gateway City Museum of Antiquities, where she had a penchant for getting into trouble. She quickly befriended her mother's new employee, Wonder Woman, and was eager to help her. During a fight with a Doomsday clone and another battle with Decay, she created a costume and used magical artifacts (the Sandals of Hermes and the Gauntlet of Atlas) to help Wonder Woman, much to her mother's horror. Cassie later had the opportunity to ask Zeus for a boon, and requested real superpowers. Zeus granted her request, but gave Dr. Sandsmark the ability to deactivate them. Dr. Sandsmark, however, reluctantly accepted her daughter's wish to be a superheroine and rarely, if ever, used this ability. Artemis was assigned as her teacher.

Even without her powers, Cassie was a problem child, and frequently had to change schools. Throughout her teens, she attended Holliday School for Girls, Brewer High School, Dennis Peterson High School, Gateway City High School, and eventually the Saint Elias School for Girls.

=== Young Justice ===
Cassie Sandsmark as depicted on the variant cover of Young Justice (vol. 2) #1 (January 2019). Art by Doc Shaner.

Cassie heavily idolized Donna Troy, the original Wonder Girl, and to that effect wore a black wig over her natural blonde hair (it also helped to conceal her identity). Donna gave Cassie the second costume she wore as Wonder Girl, but Cassie was afraid to wear it lest it were ruined. As Wonder Girl, Cassie joined Young Justice due to her crush on Superboy. She became close friends with Arrowette, Secret, and Empress. During her time with that group, the dark god Oblivion caused Wonder Woman's Wonder Dome palace to destroy Gateway City. Artemis ordered Cassie to help with crowd control instead of wasting time putting on her Wonder Girl disguise. Agreeing with her, Cassie revealed her secret identity before news cameras for the first time in her superhero career. Towards the end of the Young Justice series, Cassie became the leader of the team, beating Robin during an election for command due to inner-team tension following the recent revelation of Batman's security protocols against the rest of the Justice League, which made Young Justice uncomfortable that Robin had similar plans to use on them. Her secret identity was again publicly revealed when the second Silver Swan attacked her at her high school.

Young Justice was disbanded after the events of Graduation Day, a crossover with Titans. During these events, Optitron offered to fund both the Titans and Young Justice. Donna Troy was seemingly killed by a rogue Superman android, leaving Cassie shaken and causing both teams to disband.

=== Teen Titans ===
Cassie later joined some former members of Young Justice in the newest incarnation of the Teen Titans. Early on, she was gifted with a lasso by Ares, the Greek god of war and frequent enemy of Wonder Woman and the Amazons. Despite appearing similar to Wonder Woman's lasso, Cassie's expelled Zeus' lightning when used in anger. Over the course of the series, Ares often appeared to Wonder Girl to warn her about "the coming war". During her time with the Titans, Cassie also developed a relationship with Superboy, for whom she had harbored feelings before and throughout Young Justice.

In "Titans Tomorrow," the Titans were thrown 10 years into their future, where they encountered future versions of themselves. In this future, Cassie inherited the mantle of Wonder Woman after Diana was killed during "the Crisis." She was also referred to as "Ares' champion" and was in a relationship with Superboy. It was not revealed whether they were married or merely dating.

It was also during her Titans membership that she was revealed to be Zeus' daughter, a fact both Zeus and her mother kept from her for most of her life. Cassie was originally told by her mother that her biological father had died. Wonder Woman knew about Cassie's link to Zeus but chose to hide this from Cassie as well at the request of Cassie's mother. In "The Insiders," she was beaten by Superboy as a result of his possession by Lex Luthor; though she recovered, Superboy secluded himself at the Kent farm in Smallville, and there was a strain on their relationship until the events of Infinite Crisis.

When the Teen Titans and the Outsiders learned that Donna Troy was still alive in The Return of Donna Troy, Cassie was among the heroes that traveled to the planet Minosyss to reunite with her. Having had false memories implanted by the Titans of Myth, Donna savagely beat Cassie until Cassie was able to restore her true memories.

=== Infinite Crisis ===
Teen Titans (vol. 3) Annual #1 Cover art by Ed Benes

During a battle against Brother Blood and a handful of zombie Titans, she acknowledged that her powers were fluctuating and sometimes disappearing altogether. Despite this, Cassie attempted to help Superboy after he was beaten to near-death by Superboy-Prime After saving him, Wonder Girl and the Titans infiltrated a LexCorp laboratory to find a way to cure Superboy. While the other Titans flew to Blüdhaven following an attack from the Society, Cassie remained at Titans Tower to watch over Superboy. When he awoke, the pair of them reconnected and remembered their past in Young Justice, which seemed so much happier and easier. Conner then took Cassie to Smallville, and, afraid that it would be their last night together, they consummated their love.

Ares again appeared to her and informed her that the reason behind her weakening power was that Zeus was taking back the powers he had granted to her as he left the mortal plane. Ares then offered Cassie some of his power in exchange for becoming his champion and acknowledging him as her brother. She joined Superboy and Nightwing up north, with powers returned, to assist in the assault on Lex Luthor's tower. Superboy sacrificed his life to defeat Superboy-Prime and destroy the tower.

=== The Cult of Conner ===
Directly after Infinite Crisis, the Teen Titans fall apart. Cassie, feeling abandoned by her best friends, leaves the Titans during the year in which 52 takes place, following Robin's departure. Cassie becomes involved in a cult heavily influenced by Kryptonian culture. She sets up an altar in Titans Tower with Kryptonian crystals and a gold figure with the Superman-insignia, which means "hope" in Kryptonian. Soon, Ralph Dibny approaches her because someone defaced the grave of his wife Sue with an upside down 'S' Shield, which in Kryptonian means "resurrection".

About five days later, Cassie and her fellow cult members meet with Ralph. Cassie mentions that it was another member, Dev-Em, who led her to join. Cassie explains that the goal of the cult is to resurrect Superboy. As a test of their process, they intend to resurrect Sue Dibny. Cassie and Ralph attend a ceremony designed to resurrect Sue, but Ralph grows suspicious and with the help of other superheroes, disrupts the ceremony, destroying the Kryptonite which was essential to the process. Cassie leaves with Dev-Em, blaming Ralph for destroying her chances to resurrect Superboy. After stopping Weather Wizard in Metropolis, Cassie meets Supernova and refers to him incorrectly as Kon-El, who actually turns out to be Booster Gold in disguise.

=== One Year Later ===
During "One Year Later", Wonder Girl is seen attempting to stop Gemini of the Brotherhood of Evil from escaping S.T.A.R. Labs with valuable technology, revealing that she had been following the Brotherhood for some time. She also sports a new costume influenced by that of the late Superboy. She now wears a Golden Age Wonder Woman-themed t-shirt and denim jeans.

She temporarily rejoins the team, under the suggestion of Cyborg so that they may combine forces to defeat the Brotherhood of Evil. After the Teen Titans and Doom Patrol defeat the Brotherhood of Evil, she decides to rejoin the team permanently. When she goes to tell Robin of her decision, she discovers his secretive and unsuccessful attempts to bring back Superboy. Though obsessed with having Conner back, Cassie reacts in horror and in an attempt to quell Robin's anger at Cassie, the two kiss. For a while the two refused to talk about the incident beyond coming to the agreement that it was a mistake, but they both have discussed it with others. With her life in disarray, Cassie has been having difficulty with her personal life, often having major confrontations with her mother. Cassie has gained a new friendship with the recently returned Supergirl, Kara Zor-El, who has shared with her in mourning the loss of Superboy and Paradise Island.

Cassie was also still very furious at Wonder Woman following the events of Infinite Crisis, due to her belief that Wonder Woman abandoned her after Conner's death to play secret agent in a new civilian identity that Batman created for her after Infinite Crisis. She was also not pleased that Robin was aware of Diana's whereabouts during the year after Infinite Crisis and did not inform her about it. Diana and Cassie have not been able to discuss their past differences, leading to Cassie to turn to Supergirl and the now resurrected Donna Troy instead for emotional support dealing with Conner's death.

Following the resurrection of Jericho at the hands of Raven, Wonder Girl and Robin request that Raven use the same ceremony to resurrect Superboy. Raven calmly explains that is not possible, because Jericho's resurrection was a special case: Jericho's soul was still on Earth, imprisoned inside of a computer disk, while Conner's has moved on to the afterlife. In the middle of this conversation with Robin and Raven, Wonder Girl is captured by Deathstroke's villainous Titans East after an attack by Inertia and Match. Each member of Titans East has been recruited to negate a specific Titan. Deathstroke selected Match, a Bizarro-type clone of Superboy, to counter Wonder Girl due to his strength and his warped visage as being a psychological edge against her.

The Titans battle furiously against the Titans East, during which they are able to convince Batgirl and Duela Dent to switch sides. Unfortunately the team is defeated by Slade's team a second time. However, Raven, Cyborg, and Duela Dent manage to get aid from Nightwing, Donna Troy, Beast Boy, and Flash (Bart Allen). Together the Titans defeat Slade, who along with Inertia, manages to escape. During the fight, Jericho possess Match, and the team is reluctant to release Match due to the danger he poses.

In the Countdown limited series, Cassie attends Bart Allen's funeral and during a heated and controversial eulogy, she vows to get revenge for Bart's death.

Cassie then becomes involved in the Amazon's attack on Washington D.C. Supergirl and Wonder Girl discover that their friends and family have been placed in an internment camp due to their ties to the Amazons. After a failed attempt to aid them, the two heroes agree to bring the U.S. President to Hippolyta to stop the war. They are ambushed by a group of Amazons in the process, which causes the President to become mortally wounded. The actions of the Amazons and Wonder Girl's own involvement cause public outcry against all those who have followed in Wonder Woman's footsteps. Ultimately Cassie declares that despite her training and past that she is not an Amazon, preferring her ties to the Teen Titans over that of the Amazons. Accepting her decision, Artemis wishes her well and leaves Cassie to her devices. Wonder Girl celebrates by sharing another kiss with Robin in front of her teammates.

In the months following the kiss, Cassie and Tim continue to go through 'will-they-won't-they' moments in which they both continue to question the validity of their relationship. Then following a battle against an army of future Titans, the pair decided at last to date. Unfortunately, their relationship is short-lived, as after their first official date Cassie ends the relationship, because she feels she is using Tim. This has resulted in a growing animosity between the pair, which has begun to bleed into their relationships with the other Titans.

==== Huntress ====
Cassie in her Amazon armor. Art by Aaron Lopresti.

Wonder Girl recently appeared in a six-issue self-titled mini-series written by J. Torres and with art and covers by Sanford Greene and Nathan Massengill. In this series, Wonder Girl attempts to make up for the mistakes made by the Amazons on her own. Cassie adopts a secret identity, taking up the name "Drusilla" (the same name used by Wonder Girl in the '70s Wonder Woman television series). However, as she attempts to apprehend a group of mystical beasts left over from the Amazons' attack, she finds herself confronted by her half-brother Hercules, who claims to want to help her become a true champion of the gods and to rebuild Olympus. Cassie is reluctant to trust him. Hercules persists and chases after Cassie, taking the form of Superboy to get her attention.

Together, Hercules and Cassie try to discover who is attacking the remaining Olympian gods. Soon into their search they are attacked by the Female Furies. Hercules stops the fight by explaining that he has allied with the Furies in hopes of rescuing the gods, or, failing that, starting a new pantheon with them. The Furies have their own plans and are only using Hercules to get to Wonder Girl. The Furies soon betray Hercules, with Bloody Mary using her bite to gain power over Hercules, forcing him to do what the Furies want. The Furies then kidnap Cassie's mother to lure her into a trap. Aided by the Olympian, Wonder Girl goes into battle, being forced to fight her own brother. The Teen Titans, Empress, Arrowette and Wonder Woman show up to help. After Bloody Mary is murdered by the New Gods killer, Hercules is freed from her spell and immediately saves Wonder Girl from being kidnapped by the Furies. Hercules goes free after he reveals he is now a demi-god and that Zeus released him to help stop "the Great Disaster". Hercules then leaves to perform certain "labors".

The series ends with Cassie reconciling with Wonder Woman, who tells Cassie that she has become her own woman.

Cassie is later attacked by her nephew Lycus, the son of Ares. He attempts to take her title as Ares' avatar, along with her power. Although he is successful in stealing Cassie's powers derived from Ares, Cassie discovers that she no longer needs to be blessed with powers from the gods as she willed her own innate power to surface. Cassie now possesses a high level of super-strength all her own.

Robin ultimately makes the decision to leave the Teen Titans for an undetermined length of time in the aftermath of Batman R.I.P, leaving Cassie with the task of assembling and leading a new team. After an unsuccessful attempt at having Kid Devil recruit teen metahumans such as Klarion, Shining Knight, and the teen members of the Justice Society of America, Cassie eventually gains three new Titans in Static, Aquagirl, and Kid Eternity. Kid Eternity's ability to summon the spirits of the deceased briefly tempts Cassie, who considers having him summon Conner's spirit. However, she eventually decides against it, telling Eternity never to grant her such a request, even if she were to beg him.

Some months later, between the Final Crisis and the Blackest Night, Cassie becomes aware of Conner's rebirth by Brainiac 5's hand. Despite meeting him briefly at his return, Cassie decides to wait, until Martha Kent herself, now sheltering Conner at her place, invites Cassie for dinner, essentially granting Cassie and Conner a date. At first skeptical and fearing to end as Lana Lang, basically forgotten and replaced as Conner relocated to Smallville and gained a new circle of friends, she's touched by Conner opening his heart to her about her fears and dreams for their future life, and thus decides to tell Conner about herself and Tim Drake. Conner quickly forgives her, arguing that even if Cassie still loves him, she could not have known of his impending resurrection in the immediate aftermath of the Infinite Crisis, so she has nothing to blame. Happily, Cassie accepts to rekindle their relationship.

Due to personal responsibilities, neither Conner nor Bart return to the Teen Titans, though Wonder Girl still continues to lead. However, following the demise of Kid Devil, Cassie begins questioning her leadership and begins to make mistakes. During a massive battle with Cinderblock in downtown San Francisco, Wonder Girl refuses to let her team attack the villain directly, causing massive destruction to the area. The heroes continue in their fruitless stalemate until Beast Boy arrives and takes command of the team, leading to their victory. In the aftermath of the battle, Beast Boy tells Cassie that she has to stop dwelling on Devil's death or else more innocent people are going to get hurt, something she does not take kindly.

A few days later, Beast Boy makes the decision to move back into Titans Tower and replace Cassie as the head of the team, declaring that they need a more experienced leader to get back on track. Though Cassie initially says nothing about this, she ultimately becomes angry and tells Beast Boy that no one asked for his help, and that she can lead the team just fine. Beast Boy simply replies by saying that the Teen Titans need help, and that everyone, including Cyborg, think so.

=== Blackest Night ===
During the events of Blackest Night, Cassie joins Kid Flash and Beast Boy as part of a small group of past and present Titans who assemble at Titans Tower. Lacking assistance from Static, Miss Martian, Blue Beetle, Bombshell, and Aquagirl (each of whom are presumably defending other cities), the team barely survives the onslaught.

After Dawn Granger uses her abilities to destroy the Black Lanterns, Cassie and the others travel to Coast City to assist Barry Allen and Hal Jordan in their battle with Nekron, the leader of the Black Lantern Corps. To the horror of the gathered heroes, Nekron uses his abilities to transform several once-dead heroes into Black Lanterns, including Superboy, Kid Flash, Donna, and Wonder Woman. In the ensuing battle, Cassie is killed when Donna Troy violently tears her heart out. However, it is then revealed that the entire battle was an imagination of Wonder Woman, and Cassie is shown to still be alive. When Black Lantern Conner attacks Cassie, all the while attempting to break free from the Black Ring's control, Conner manages to break the control in temporary, short lapses, which he uses to alert Cassie about the solution to his Black Ring problem. The battle moves to the fortress, where Cassie realizes what Conner was referring to when he told them to move to the Fortress of Solitude Conner's corpse, placed where he awaits his resurrection in Legion of Three Worlds. The Black Ring, confused, leaves the living Conner and tries to attach itself to his corpse, but Conner awakens his freeze breath ability, which freezes the ring, and Cassie throws it into orbit. After reconciling, the pair heads back to Coast City for the final battle with Nekron's army.

=== Return of Conner ===
After this, Cassie travels to New York to confront Cyborg about Beast Boy's statements. He assures her that she is capable of leading the Titans, and she returns to the team and admits to them that she is done moping over Conner and Eddie. She then leads the team to the city of Dakota to rescue Static, who had been kidnapped by a superhuman gangster named Holocaust. After hearing about a battle between Static and Holocaust in downtown Dakota, Cassie arrives on the scene with Bombshell and Aquagirl. The three heroines are easily defeated and captured by Holocaust, who then informs them that he plans on killing them and weaponizing their powers to sell. Beast Boy and the other Titans arrive at the compound to retrieve their comrades, but end up being overpowered and defeated themselves. At the last second, Cyborg bursts into the compound with Superboy and Kid Flash, preparing to rescue the other Titans. Cassie is soon freed, and assists Superboy in holding off Holocaust while the other Titans make their escape. In the final battle, Cassie uses her lasso to bind the villain, allowing Kid Flash to finish him off by sending him plummeting into the Earth's inner core (though thanks to his superhuman durability, Static remarks that the core would not kill him). On the plane ride back to San Francisco, Conner remarks that Cassie seems to be ignoring him, and she simply responds by telling him that he is correct.

Cassie later travels to Gotham City alongside several of her fellow Titans after Ra's al Ghul begins targeting people close to Tim Drake. She attempts to rescue Barbara Gordon from members of the League of Assassins, but arrives to find that she has already defeated the men that attempted to kill her.

During the events of Brightest Day, Cassie confronts Osiris when he arrives at Titans Tower, looking for help from his former teammates. Cassie tries to convince Osiris to turn himself over to the police for the murdering the Persuader during 52, but he angrily brushes her off and flees before Cassie can contact the authorities. Blue Beetle asks if the Titans should go after him, but Cassie simply replies by saying that Osiris will return, and then rhetorically asks, "where else can he go?"

After a disastrous mission to another dimension to rescue Raven, the Titans are torn asunder. Miss Martian is rendered comatose, Static is left temporarily depowered, and Aquagirl and Bombshell are missing and presumed dead at sea. Despite her pleas for Static to stay, Wonder Girl is ultimately left with a roster consisting of only herself, Superboy, Kid Flash, Raven, and Beast Boy. A short time after this, the Titans rescue Bombshell and Aquagirl, who are both removed from the team by Wonder Girl. When asked about this decision (as well as the subsequent choice to invite the unstable Rose Wilson back into the team), Wonder Girl states that Kid Devil's death has forced her to realize that inexperienced teen heroes have no place on the team. At the same time, she admits to Conner that she is having trouble reconciling her knowledge as a leader with her fear of losing him again.

=== One-shot ===
In January 2011, Wonder Girl was given a one-shot, which was written by JT Krul, drawn by Adriana Melo, and covered by Nicola Scott.

=== The New 52 ===
In September 2011, The New 52 rebooted DC's continuity. In this new timeline, Cassie Sandsmark is reintroduced in the Teen Titans series. This version of Cassie, who dislikes being called "Wonder Girl", started out as a teenage thief, who started at the age of sixteen and lost touch with her mother, who stole a pair of enchanted bracelets from a temple before meeting Red Robin. Living in Hollywood surviving on a crime spree and bought a little house with the money she made. She first crossed paths with Red Robin after she was rescued from an organization called N.O.W.H.E.R.E., who were capturing young teenagers who were developing metahuman abilities for their own nefarious purposes. She caught the organization's attention when her exploits were attaching attention her from the media which they dubbed her "Wonder Girl". She stole a car but was later pulled by a police officer in the Pacific Coast Highway, the latter was revealed to be an agent of N.O.W.H.E.R.E. and tried to capture her but Red Robin intervened. Red Robin was tracking down N.O.W.H.E.R.E and news coverage of teenagers with abilities and their actions in a lecture by Lex Luthor about aliens on earth. She is later revealed to be the daughter of Helen, an archaeologist who reputation was destroyed when Cassie stole the bracelets which resulted in the death of one of Helen's colleagues, who was Cassandra's one time love interest and mentor in stealing, and Lennox Sandsmark, a British super-soldier, who left the family when Cassie was only four years old. As Lennox is a demigod son of Zeus, and also a half-brother of Wonder Woman, Cassie, for the first time, is related to Wonder Woman.

=== Rebirth ===
In the Super Sons of Tomorrow crossover, the version of Cassie Sandmark from the Titans Tomorrow future briefly arrived in the present timeline of Rebirth alongside other members of the Titans of Tomorrow.

In Young Justice #2, Zeus refers to Cassie as "the future of the pantheon of the gods". As part of her birthright, Zeus offers her a necklace that is said to contain immense powers. However, Cassie decides to hold off on taking this gift until she does something to truly earn it. Zeus calls her a "giant pain, just like her mother".

Cassie Sandsmark next appears in Yara Flor's new series Wonder Girl Volume 3 Issue 2, where she is tasked by Queen Hippolyta to find Yara Flor due to Yara Flor being part of a prophecy to destroy the Amazons.

== Powers and abilities ==
Cassandra originally received her powers from a number of mystical artifacts employed by Artemis during her time as Wonder Woman. These included the Gauntlet of Atlas and the Sandals of Hermes, which provided her with the powers of strength and speed/flight, respectively. She was eventually granted similar abilities by Zeus as "her fondest wish". Discouraged by previously shown arrogance in his children (Ares and Heracles), Zeus also blessed Cassandra's mother with the ability to take away her powers for a short time via a simple touch. Cassie later lost the powers given to her by Zeus when he abandoned the mortal realm, which her brother Ares replaced for her in exchange for becoming his champion, also bestowing upon her a magical lasso which channels Zeus's lightning. With Ares' backing, Cassie's strength and prowess became greater than before, until she displeased her patron. In rejecting Ares' gifts, however, she learned to tap into her own divine heritage, finally manifesting her own innate gifts of superhuman strength, speed, durabilty, reflexes, and flight.

Cassie was trained by the Amazon Artemis and trained in the use of various weapons in addition to martial arts. She also proved to be a very capable leader and strategist.

During the New 52 era, Cassie was initially reintroduced in Teen Titans as gaining her powers from the Silent Armor, a demonic suit of armour and infinitely extensible red lasso forged in the heart of a sun and connected to Trigon. Later, Wonder Woman comics established that she was a granddaughter of Zeus (not his daughter as previously), leading to Cassie learning to use her powers even without the Silent Armor and to resist its evil influence. Cassie's New 52 history was subsequently discarded, apart from the change to her parentage, with later Wonder Woman and Teen Titans comics reestablishing her pre-New 52 history with Wonder Woman.

== Other versions ==
- In Teen Titans: Earth One, Cassie Sandsmark is reimagined as a metahuman and enforcer of S.T.A.R. Labs alongside Kole and Wally West/Impulse.
- Cassie also has a recurring role on the Tiny Titans comic by Art Baltazar and Franco Aureliani. In the first issue, she is ridiculed by her cousin Donna Troy, Dick Grayson, Cyborg, and Kid Flash for wearing a T-shirt and jeans instead of a skirt with stars. However, when she returns, wearing a skirt with stars and a helmet, she finds the boys all wearing T-shirts and jeans. Her response to this is: "What? I did it first, y'know!"

== In other media ==
=== Television ===
Cassandra Sandsmark as she appeared in Young Justice.

Cassie Sandsmark / Wonder Girl appears in Young Justice, voiced by Mae Whitman. Introduced in the second season, Invasion, this version is a member of the Team's Beta Squad who goes on to date Tim Drake by the end of the season. In the third season, Outsiders, her relationship with Drake becomes strained after he leaves the Team. Despite this, she helps found the titular Outsiders. In the fourth season, Phantoms, she takes on a leadership role after the Outsiders' leader Beast Boy falls into depression following Superboy's presumed death.

=== Film ===
- Cassie Sandsmark makes a cameo appearance in Justice League: Throne of Atlantis.
- The Young Justice incarnation of Cassie Sandsmark makes a non-speaking cameo appearance in Scooby-Doo! WrestleMania Mystery.
- Cassie Sandsmark / Wonder Girl appears in Batman and Superman: Battle of the Super Sons, voiced by Myrna Velasco.

=== Video games ===
- Cassie Sandsmark / Wonder Girl appears in DC Universe Online, voiced by Mindy Raymond.
- Cassie Sandsmark / Wonder Girl appears in Young Justice: Legacy, voiced again by Mae Whitman. Additionally, Wonder Woman's outfit and Sandsmark's New 52 outfit appear as alternate skins.
- Cassie Sandsmark / Wonder Girl appears in Lego Batman 3: Beyond Gotham, voiced by Kari Wahlgren.
- Cassie Sandsmark / Wonder Girl makes a cameo appearance in Cyborg's ending in Injustice 2. This version is a member of the Teen Titans who was killed years prior.
- Cassie Sandsmark / Wonder Girl appears as a playable character in DC Legends.
- Cassie Sandsmark / Wonder Girl appears as a playable character in Lego DC Super-Villains.

=== Miscellaneous ===
- Cassie Sandsmark / Wonder Girl appears in Teen Titans Go!. This version is the obsessive head of her high school's Wonder Woman fan club. Amidst repeated attempts at getting the latter to visit her school, Sandsmark crashes an athletic tournament set up by Donna Troy on Paradise Island to find someone to succeed her as Wonder Woman's partner and steals two mystical artifacts that grant her superpowers. After defeating Trident, Troy offers Sandsmark membership into the Teen Titans once the latter's mother finishes punishing her.
- The Injustice incarnation of Cassie Sandsmark / Wonder Girl appears in the Injustice: Gods Among Us prequel comics as a member of the Teen Titans who survived the Metropolis disaster. She is tasked with spying on her teammate Superboy after Superman kills the Joker. Upon learning of Superboy's attempt to send Superman to the Phantom Zone, the Titans join him in fighting Superman, who mortally wounds Superboy, forcing the Titans to imprison themselves in the Phantom Zone to save him.
- The Injustice incarnation of Cassie Sandsmark / Wonder Girl appears in the Injustice 2 prequel comic. After Batman's Insurgency free the Titans from the Phantom Zone, the latter group join them in fighting Atrocitus and Starro until Wonder Girl and Superboy are captured, tortured, and left for dead by Brainiac and rescued by Booster Gold to help the Legion of Super-Heroes.
