= Empress (character) =

Publication information
- Publisher: DC Comics
- First appearance: Young Justice #16 (January 2000)
- Created by: Peter David; Todd Nauck

In-story information
- Alter ego: Anita Fite
- Team affiliations: Young Justice
- Abilities: Vocal coercion; Teleportation; Vodou practitioner

Empress (Anita Fite) is a superheroine appearing in American comic books published by DC Comics. She first appeared in Young Justice #16 (January 2000), and was created by Peter David and Todd Nauck.

== Fictional character biography ==
Anita Fite is the daughter of Donald Fite, of the All Purpose Enforcement Squad, one of the Young Justice team's early enemies. She grew up learning Haitian Vodou from her mother and grandmother. Her mother was killed when she was young by the villain Agua Sin Gaaz.

Empress first appears in Young Justice #16, where she saves Wonder Girl from dying of a poisonous snakebite.

Shortly afterward, during Young Justice's visit to the Olympics to support their former teammate, Cissie King-Jones (Arrowette), she meets the team out of costume. During this meeting, her father reveals to the team that Anita has been operating as a superhero under the name "Empress", a childhood nickname from her mother. Anita reveals she had been inspired to become a superheroine after witnessing Arrowette stop a thief. Anita was so impressed that she began to use her vodou skills to fight for good. After this, Empress joins Young Justice, remaining a member for the rest of the run.

In Young Justice #24 (October 2000), Agua Sin Gaaz returns and kills Empress' father, then retreats to the island Zandia, a haven for supervillains. Young Justice invades the island and successfully defeats Gaaz. Empress' parents are reincarnated into infant bodies during this arc, with Empress becoming a guardian to them.

In January 2006, Empress appears as backup in the fight to save Gotham City from wild magic in the Infinite Crisis special follow-up to Day of Vengeance. Anita appears again in Infinite Crisis #6, assisting the world's mystics at Stonehenge in summoning the Spectre.

Anita makes minor appearances in the Wonder Girl miniseries in 2007-2008, helping Wonder Girl come to terms with the death of Superboy. Toward the end of the mini-series, Empress appears in costume, assisting Wonder Girl and several other Young Justice alumni against the Female Furies.

Anita appears in Final Crisis along with Más y Menos and Sparx in a failed attempt to launch the League of Titans. The four are defeated by Mirror Master and Doctor Light. She next appears in Supergirl vol. 5 #33 (July 2008). After her parents (still in their infant bodies) are kidnapped, Empress seeks out Supergirl to help her retrieve them. It is revealed that Empress is leading Supergirl into a trap on the orders of the supervillain, in exchange for the safe return of her parents. Empress then double-crosses the villain and aids in saving her parents and Supergirl.

== Powers and abilities ==
Empress wields a portion of the Anti-Life Equation, which gives her limited mind-controlling abilities. Additionally, she is a skilled practitioner of vodou magic and wields a sword baton called the "Emperor's Stick".
