= Bart Allen =

Comics character

- Bart Allen as Impulse as he appeared on the cover of the trade paperback Impulse: Reckless Youth (April 1997). Art by Humberto Ramos.

Publication information
- Publisher: DC Comics
- First appearance: As Impulse: Cameo appearance: The Flash #91 (June 1994); Full appearance: The Flash #92 (July 1994); As Kid Flash: Teen Titans #4 (December 2003); As Flash: The Flash: The Fastest Man Alive #1 (May 2006)
- Created by: Mark Waid (writer); Mike Wieringo (artist)

In-story information
- Full name: Bartholomew Henry "Bart" Allen II; Bar Torr (The New 52 era)
- Species: Metahuman
- Team affiliations: Young Justice; Teen Titans; Legion of Super-Heroes; Justice League
- Partnerships: The Flash (various); Max Mercury
- Notable aliases: Impulse; Kid Flash; The Flash
- Abilities: See list: Genetic connection to the Speed Force grants: Immense superhuman speed, agility, and reflexes; Speed Force absorption, negation, and empathy; Air manipulation and temperature manipulation; Intangibility and invisibility via molecular vibration at high velocity; Vortex generation; Electricity generation; Time travel and dimensional travel via superluminal speed; Energy transformation; Light projection; Accelerated healing; Enhanced perceptions and senses; Time manipulation; Sonic shockwave projection; Genius-level intellect; Advanced hand-to-hand combatant

Bartholomew Henry "Bart" Allen II is a superhero appearing in American comic books published by DC Comics. A speedster, he first appeared under the alias Impulse and later became the second Kid Flash and the fourth Flash. Created by Mark Waid and Mike Wieringo, Bart first made a cameo in The Flash (vol. 2) #91 in 1994 before his full debut in issue #92. He has since been featured as the lead character in Impulse (1995–2002) and The Flash: The Fastest Man Alive (2006–2007). Bart also appears in the series Young Justice and Teen Titans as a member of both superhero teams.

Outside of comics, Bart has been portrayed by Kyle Gallner in the live-action television series Smallville. Jason Marsden voiced the character in the animated series Young Justice. Jordan Fisher portrays a variation of the character as the future son of Barry Allen and Iris West-Allen starting in the seventh season of The CW Arrowverse television series The Flash as a recurring character.

== Publication history ==
Initially, Bart Allen was the sidekick of Wally West. After Wally West's apparent death in the Infinite Crisis crossover event in 2006, Bart became the Flash. His tenure as the Flash was brief and concluded with his death in issue 13 of The Flash: The Fastest Man Alive. Series writer Marc Guggenheim stated that his death was an editorial decision, and that he was instructed that his five-issue run would have to end with Bart's death.

Bart remained dead for two years of publication before being resurrected in the 2009 series Final Crisis: Legion of 3 Worlds. During DC's The New 52 era, Bart Allen was reintroduced in Teen Titans as the alias of an amnesiac revolutionary from the future named Bar Torr; the character was later written out of comics, and his tenure erased from continuity by the subsequent DC Rebirth initiative. The original Bart Allen was brought back in the 2019 series Young Justice.

== Fictional character biography ==
Bart Allen's full debut as Impulse on the cover of The Flash (vol. 2) #92 (July 1994).

Bart Allen is the son of Meloni Thawne (a descendant of Eobard Thawne) and Don Allen (the son of Barry Allen), who relocated to the alternate universe of Earth-247. Due to his Speed Force abilities, Bart ages rapidly, causing him to appear to be twelve when he is chronologically only two years old. Bart is raised in a virtual reality world that adheres to his sense of time. When it becomes clear that this method is not working, Bart's grandmother Iris West takes him to the 21st century, where Wally West tricks Bart into overexerting his abilities and returning his metabolism to normal. Because he spent most of his childhood in a simulated world, Bart has no concept of danger and is prone to reckless behavior.

Bart proves to be more trouble than Wally can handle and is placed in the custody of Max Mercury. Bart joins the Teen Titans early in his career before becoming a founding member of Young Justice alongside Robin and Superboy. Following Max Mercury's disappearance, Bart is adopted by Jay Garrick, the first Flash, and his wife Joan. After Young Justice disbands, Bart rejoins the Teen Titans.

=== Kid Flash ===
Bart as Kid Flash. Interior artwork from Teen Titans vol. 3, 4 (December 2003) Art by Mike McKone.

Shortly after Bart joins the Teen Titans, he is shot in the knee by Deathstroke, who at the time was possessed by Jericho. While recovering, Bart reinvents himself as Kid Flash.

In the series Infinite Crisis, Bart pursues Superboy-Prime after he escapes prison, ending up in an alternate universe. Bart returns to his own universe, having sustained amnesia, and participates in the Battle of Metropolis. After regaining his memories, Bart attacks Superboy-Prime, who killed Superboy in battle. When the battle is over, Bart claims that he had used up the last of his speed, leaving him powerless.

=== The Flash: The Fastest Man Alive (2006–2009) ===
Bart Allen as the Flash. Variant incentive cover to The Flash: The Fastest Man Alive #1 (2006). Art by Andy Kubert and Joe Kubert.

Following the events of Infinite Crisis, Bart gets a job as a factory worker at Keystone Motors and tries to leave super-heroics behind. When his roommate Griffin Grey gains superpowers and becomes the supervillain Griffin, Bart assumes the mantle of the Flash.

During a battle with Bart, the Rogues use a machine built by Inertia, Bart's clone, to drain his powers. Inertia's machine proves unstable and threatens to destroy the West Coast if the Speed Force is not safely released from it. Bart battles the Rogues before chasing after Inertia, distracting them while Valerie Perez releases the Speed Force from the machine. In a panic, the Rogues kill Bart.

In the series Final Crisis: Legion of 3 Worlds, Bart Allen returns when Brainiac 5 frees him from the Speed Force as part of his plan to defeat Superboy-Prime and the Legion of Super-Villains. His resurrection is brought about by the activation of the "living lightning rod" first seen in The Lightning Saga. Brainiac 5 explains that Bart was destined to die one way or another, because his leap from child to adult had reactivated Bart's accelerated aging; had the Rogues not killed him, he would have been dead of old age within months. Soon after Bart's resurrection, the Legion also revive Superboy. Together, the pair aid the Legion in defeating Superboy-Prime.

=== Flashpoint ===
In the storyline "Flashpoint", Bart Allen is captured by Brainiac and loses his powers. He is confronted by Hot Pursuit and with her help, escapes from Brainiac. This Hot Pursuit reveals herself to be Patty Spivot, Barry Allen's assistant. Bart must find a way to get his super-speed back before being erased from existence. Bart learns that Patty stole Hot Pursuit's motorcycle and has taken his place. Bart allows himself to be recaptured by Brainiac and is placed into a stasis pod, destroying Brainiac's security program from the inside. Patty holds off Brainiac and breaks an energy projector, which returns Bart's powers. Bart then runs through time to the 21st century, promising Patty that he will return and rescue her. However, Bart becomes connected to the Black Flash and is forced to drain energy from other speedsters. Bart sacrifices himself by giving his energy to Barry Allen so that he can restore the timeline and is absorbed into the Speed Force.

=== DC Rebirth ===
Variant cover of Young Justice vol. 3 #1 (March 2019). Art by Derrick Chew.

In the DC Rebirth relaunch, Bart Allen returns after Wally West and Barry Allen break the barrier of the Speed Force. Once again wearing the Impulse costume, he emerges from the Speed Force and races through a city street, triumphantly declaring that he is back. Shortly afterward, he reunites with his teammates in Young Justice and the Teen Titans.

== Powers and abilities ==
Bart's primary power is superhuman speed, along with abilities common to speedsters, such as creating whirlwinds, running on water, and vibrating through matter. The latter ability results in "molecular taffy" if Bart does not concentrate; he also possesses an aura that protects him from friction. Bart does possess some abilities that other speedsters do not have. He has the ability to produce "scouts", Speed Force avatars that he can send through the timestream, but has used it infrequently. Bart has also displayed the ability to create powerful radio waves by rotating his arms at high speeds and using the resulting vibrations in conjunction with his teammate Static's electromagnetic abilities.

== Other versions ==
=== Bar Torr ===
Bar Torr as Kid Flash, on the cover to DC Universe Presents #12 (2012) Art by Jorge Jimenez.

After the DC universe was rebooted in 2011, a new character based on Bart Allen is introduced. Teen Titans (vol. 4) #1 opens with an amnesiac Bart six months prior to his first appearance, saving a mansion from a fire. He cannot explain how he is able to move at superhuman speeds, but he is certain that he has a connection to the Flash, and so begins to call himself "Kid Flash". Virgil Hawkins performs diagnostic tests on Bart and concludes that Bart is not from the 21st century, indicating that he may possibly be from the 30th century. Virgil presents Kid Flash with a new uniform that can keep his molecules aligned.

Kid Flash is later revealed to be Bar Torr, who was sent to the 21st century as part of a witness protection program. A reactionary from the planet Altros Prime in the far future, Bar was the son of a religious couple who were murdered by the Purifiers, agents of the planet's Functionary regime. Too young to kill any Purifiers himself, Bar joined their ranks instead. Following a space ship crash while smuggling contraband for the Purifiers, Bar discovered that by unknown means he had acquired healing abilities and superhuman speed. He assembled an army of reactionaries and began a full-scale rebellion against the Functionary, which lasted years until members of his rebellion injured his sister Shira, who grew up on the side of the Functionary. This prompted Bar to turn himself in. Seeking penance, he promised the Functionary he would take down his own rebellion from the inside. While the prosecution assembled its case against Bar, he was sent to the 21st century and had his memories overridden.

== In other media ==
=== Television ===
==== Animation ====
Impulse as he appears in the initial Justice League proposal.

- Bart Allen as Impulse appears in Kids' WB's original pitch for Justice League as a junior member of the eponymous team. While Impulse, among other characters, were cut to avoid making the series feel like Super Friends, the pitch was released as a bonus on the series' first season DVD.
- Bart Allen as Kid Flash appears in the Mad segment "That's What Super Friends Are For", voiced by Jason Marsden.
- Bart Allen as Impulse and Kid Flash appears in Young Justice, voiced again by Jason Marsden. This version originates from a Reach-controlled future in the year 2056. Introduced in the second season as Impulse, Bart and Neutron build a time machine so that Bart can change the future, despite knowing he will not be able to return to his own time. Over the course of his mission, Bart joins the Team, becomes Jaime Reyes' best friend, is adopted by Jay and Joan Garrick, and reluctantly becomes the new Kid Flash after Wally West's death. In the third and fourth seasons, Outsiders and Phantoms, Bart joins the Outsiders and is implied to be dating El Dorado.

==== Live-action ====
Kyle Gallner as Bart Allen in Smallville.

- Bart Allen as Impulse appears in Smallville, portrayed by Kyle Gallner. This version is a self-centered thief who initially uses his powers for personal gain. After helping Clark Kent save his father Jonathan Kent, Bart considers reforming and leaves to travel the world and find others like himself and Clark. As of the episode "Justice", he has assumed the codename "Impulse" despite not choosing it himself and joins forces with Green Arrow, among other heroes, to thwart Lex Luthor and LuthorCorp's plans. From the eighth season onwards, Bart makes minor appearances as a member of the Justice League.
- Bart Allen as Impulse appears in The Flash, portrayed by Jordan Fisher. This version is Barry Allen and Iris West-Allen's future son, younger brother of Nora West-Allen, and, according to showrunner Eric Wallace, is much older, funnier, charming than other incarnations, but with an edge.

=== Video games ===
- Bart Allen as Kid Flash appears as a character summon in Scribblenauts Unmasked: A DC Comics Adventure.
- Bart Allen as Kid Flash appears as a playable character in Lego Batman 3: Beyond Gotham.
- The Young Justice incarnation of Bart Allen / Impulse appears as a non-playable character in Lego DC Super-Villains.

=== Miscellaneous ===
- Bart Allen as Impulse appears in Adventures in the DC Universe #13.
- Bart Allen as Impulse appears in Legion of Super Heroes in the 31st Century #15.
- Bart Allen as Kid Flash appears in Injustice: Gods Among Us: Year Three #7 as a member of the Teen Titans who was killed by the Joker's nuclear bomb.
- The Smallville incarnation of Bart Allen / Impulse appears in Smallville Season 11. In the "Haunted" arc, Bart and Clark Kent seek Jay Garrick in defeating the Black Flash before Bart sacrifices himself to send the Black Flash into the Speed Force. Additionally, a young Bart appears in the "Legion" arc.

== Collected editions ==
Stories featuring Bart Allen from The Flash, Impulse and The Flash: The Fastest Man Alive have been collected into trade paperbacks:

Title	Material collected
Impulse: Reckless Youth	The Flash #92–94, Impulse #1–6
The Flash: Dead Heat	The Flash #108–111, Impulse #9–11
The Flash Presents: Mercury Falling	Impulse #62–67
The Flash The Fastest Man Alive: Lightning in a Bottle	The Flash: The Fastest Man Alive #1–6
The Flash The Fastest Man Alive – Full Throttle	The Flash: The Fastest Man Alive #7–13, DCU Holiday Special
The Brave and the Bold: Demons and Dragons	The Brave and the Bold #13–16, The Brave and the Bold #181, The Flash #107, Impulse #17
Flash/Impulse: Runs in the Family	The Flash #108–111, Impulse #1–12
