= Conner Kent =

DC Comics superhero

- Superboy as depicted in Teen Titans #20 (January 2005). Art by Tom Grummett.

Publication information
- Publisher: DC Comics
- First appearance: The Adventures of Superman #500 (June 1993)
- Created by: Karl Kesel; Tom Grummett

In-story information
- Species: Metahuman clone (1993–2003); Human/Kryptonian binary clone (2003–present)
- Team affiliations: Young Justice; The Ravers; Legion of Super-Heroes; Superman family Teen Titans; Justice League
- Partnerships: Superman; Krypto; Robin (Tim Drake)
- Notable aliases: Superboy; Kon-El; The Metropolis Kid; The Hero of Hawaii; Superman Prime; Experiment 13 "Superman"; The Boy of Steel; K-on
- Abilities: See list: Tactile telekinesis; Kryptonian physiology; Superhuman strength, stamina, endurance, speed, agility, reflexes, intelligence, longevity, and hearing; Invulnerability; Flight; Enhanced vision; X-ray vision; EM spectrum vision; Microscopic vision; Infrared vision; Telescopic vision; Heat vision; Ice and wind breath; Solar radiation absorption; Combat experience

Conner Kent is a superhero appearing in American comic books published by DC Comics. The character first appeared as a modern variation of Superboy in The Adventures of Superman #500 (June 1993), and was created by writer Karl Kesel and artist Tom Grummett.

From the character's debut in 1993 to 2003, Superboy was depicted as a genetically-engineered metahuman clone of human origin designed by Paul Westfield of Project Cadmus as a duplicate and equivalent of Superman, though released before he had fully matured. The character was retconned in Teen Titans (vol. 3) #1 (September 2003) as a human/Kryptonian binary clone made from the DNA of Superman and Lex Luthor. This has since become the character's most enduring origin story in later comic books and media adaptations. He later adopts the honorary Kryptonian name Kon-El and the private name Conner Kent.

The character made his live action debut in the series Smallville, portrayed by Lucas Grabeel, and has appeared in the series Titans, played by Joshua Orpin. Nolan North and Cameron Monaghan have voiced the character in animations.

== Publication history ==
Kon-El is depicted as a modern incarnation of Superboy, originally portrayed as an identity used by Clark Kent. Writer Karl Kesel and artist Tom Grummett envisioned a contemporary take on Superboy that would appeal to Generation X/Millennial readers as well as a character both creators would have fun working on, which they did. The concept of a modern Superboy was decided during the 1992 annual "Superman Summit", where DC teams gathered to plan the next year's worth of stories. Grummett stated Jon Bogdanove and Jackson Guice came up with the name Superboy and Grummett responded, "Don't call me Superboy!". After it was decided that Kesel and Grummett would oversee the character, Grummett sketched Superboy's fully-formed look on an airplane napkin on his flight home, adding Superboy's leather jacket when he returned to his home studio and faxed the design to editor Mike Carlin. Grummett said that he did not base Superboy off of one person or model and his design came spontaneously. Kesel and Grummett pitched their idea to DC Comics and the new Superboy debuted in The Adventures of Superman #500 (cover date June 1993). According to distributor estimates, Adventures of Superman #500 was likely the best-selling comic of 1993, while April (the month it was released to the public) had the highest monthly sales in comic-book history. Kesel bought a slang dictionary to assist with writing the teenaged Superboy.

The character was the first to which the Hypertime concept was applied, beginning in Superboy (vol. 4) #60 (cover date April 1999). Kesel viewed this story arc as the high point of his run on Superboy.

Volume 4 of Superboy ran for 100 issues, two specials, and four annuals from 1994 to 2002. Kesel and Grummett left the series after issue #26 citing Kesel's lack of new ideas but returned on issue #50 after Kesel experienced new inspiration for the character. The team left again after issue #80 but contributed some cover art. In 2002, Kesel and Grummett returned to work on the 100th issue series finale.

For the 30th anniversary of the Return of Superman in 2023, Kesel, Grummet, Doug Hazlewood and Glenn Whitmore, all of whom worked on Superboy's first appearance in The Adventures of Superman #500, were credited for The Metropolis Kid story, with Richard Starkings as letterer replacing Albert DeGuzman, who died in 2022.

== Fictional character biography ==
=== Origin ===
Superboy as depicted on the cover of Superboy (vol. 4) #1 (February 1994). Art by Tom Grummett.

After Doomsday kills Superman, Project Cadmus director Paul Westfield intends to create a clone replacement of Superman as a safeguard. After failed attempts to acquire Superman's DNA, Westfield decides to genetically alter a human clone to resemble Superman and make the clone to be the closest human equivalent to a Kryptonian as they could based on their research. While studying Superman's corpse, Westfield's scientists discover a bio-electric aura surrounding his body that provides some of his powers, including invulnerability and flight through a form of self-telekinesis. The aura is translated into a telekinetic field for a human that gives the clone the ability to simulate Superman's powers, known as "tactile telekinesis". After twelve failed attempts, the clone known as Experiment 13 is given implanted memories and artificially aged to match the age of the original Superman. However, he is released from his cloning tube early, possessing the appearance and mentality of a teenager. Superboy escapes Cadmus with the help of clones of the Newsboy Legion.

=== The Metropolis Kid (1993) ===
When Superboy arrives in Metropolis, he uses the name "Superman", but makes it clear that he is not the original Superman. This information is first revealed to Lois Lane, who is not interested. This prompts the Kid to turn to another reporter, Tana Moon, who breaks the story live on WGBS. Three other Supermen emerge simultaneously: "The Man of Tomorrow" (Cyborg Superman), "The Last Son of Krypton" (Eradicator), and "The Man of Steel" (Steel). After the original Superman returns, Superboy begins operating alongside him as an independent hero for a time, refusing to be called a sidekick.

=== The Hero of Hawaii (1994–98) ===
After a few weeks of traveling the country for a promotional tour, Superboy and Dubbilex arrive in Hawaii, joined by his new agent and manager Rex Leech and Rex's daughter Roxy Leech. After a battle with Sidearm on the beach, Superboy learns that Tana Moon had moved to Hawaii. Superboy, smitten with Moon, decides to stay on the islands, stylizing himself as the "Hero of Hawaii". He rejoins Cadmus and begins working as a field agent with Dubbilex and Guardian.

=== Young Justice (1998–2003) ===
Superman asks Superboy to come with him to the Fortress of Solitude. While there, Superboy visits Krypton via virtual reality and experienced the life of a Kryptonian soldier who saved the life of Superman's ancestor Van-L during a battle against the terrorist group Black Zero. Superboy later experiences the life of Kon-El, a descendant of the same Kryptonian soldier and a member of the second House of El established by his predecessor. Superman tells Superboy that he considered him his family and gives him the Kryptonian name Kon-El. After Cadmus is shut down, Superboy relocates to Metropolis and later to Smallville, living with Jonathan and Martha Kent.

Superboy is a founding member of Young Justice, alongside Robin (Tim Drake) and Impulse (Bart Allen). The three first work together to stop the machinations of Bedlam, a teenager with godlike powers who had transported all adults on Earth to another dimension. After the events of Titans/Young Justice: Graduation Day and the apparent death of Donna Troy, Young Justice disbands.

=== Teen Titans (2003–05) ===
Now based in Smallville with a new civilian identity as Clark Kent's cousin Conner Kent, Superboy is asked by Superman to accept Cyborg's invitation to join a new incarnation of the Teen Titans with his former Young Justice teammates Robin, Impulse, and Wonder Girl as well as Cyborg, Starfire, and Beast Boy. Superboy is retconned as a hybrid clone created from the DNA of Superman and Lex Luthor and gains Kryptonian powers while retaining his telekinesis.

Superboy later begins dating Wonder Girl. During their first date, Superboy is sucked through a portal to the 31st century. When Superboy reappears, it is revealed that he was mistaken for Clark Kent and taken to the 31st century, where he fought alongside the Legion of Super-Heroes. After assisting the Legion in battling a new threat, the team attempts to return to the present, but accidentally arrive ten years in the future instead of the present. In this alternate future, Conner has greater control of his powers and regards Lex Luthor as a father figure.

Not long after the Titans return to the present, Lex Luthor takes control of Superboy and forces him to attack the Titans. His mind is eventually restored, but he is horrified at what he has done to his team and friends. Conner takes a leave of absence from the Titans and secludes himself in the home of Jonathan and Martha Kent. He doubts whether he has a soul, but Raven shows him that he does.

=== Infinite Crisis, death, and return (2005–11) ===
In Infinite Crisis (2005), Superboy-Prime watches Conner during his seclusion in an alternate dimension. Along with Alexander Luthor Jr., another survivor of the previous Crisis, Superboy-Prime intends to reconstruct the universe in his image after determining that the heroes he has been observing do not meet his standards of heroism. Resentful of Conner, whom he claims has lower standards than his own despite a seemingly perfect life, Superboy-Prime attacks him. Superboy is killed during the battle and buried in Metropolis alongside the Superman and Lois Lane of Earth-Two.

In Final Crisis: Legion of 3 Worlds (2008), Starman recovers Conner's corpse and places him in a Kryptonian healing chrysalis, resurrecting him in the 31st century. Superboy battles Superboy-Prime before returning to the 21st century.

During the Blackest Night storyline, Conner is briefly recruited into Black Lantern Corps due to having previously died. Wonder Girl manages to free him by using the temporally-complex nature of his resurrection against his Black Lantern self, luring him to the Fortress so that his power ring can be removed and destroyed.

=== The New 52 (2011) ===
The New 52 Superboy with Krypto. Art by Ken Lashley.

In September 2011, The New 52 rebooted DC's continuity. In this new timeline, Superboy is introduced with a new origin story. He is a human-Kryptonian hybrid created by the mysterious organization N.O.W.H.E.R.E., which seeks to control the new generation of metahumans.

Following the "Forever Evil" storyline, Johnny Quick throws the Teen Titans forward in time. After he is separated from the Titans, Kon-El encounters Jon Lane Kent, the villainous future son of Superman and Lois Lane. Kon-El is revealed to be a clone of Jon created by Harvest, the founder of N.O.W.H.E.R.E., to find a cure for Jon's illness. During their battle, Jon is seriously injured and Kon-El falls through a portal. He is transported to Krypton's Argo City in the past, days before the planet's destruction. Kon-El sacrifices himself to lift Argo City off Krypton and ensure that Supergirl is transported to Earth, accepting himself as more than a weapon.

Meanwhile, Jon is recovered by Beast Boy and Rose Wilson and given Kon-El's costume. The present-day Teen Titans find Jon, who joins the group and pretends to be Superboy. It is later revealed that Kon-El survived and is serving a being called the Oracle, patrolling the past, present, and future.

=== DC Rebirth ===
Conner as Superboy in Young Justice (vol. 3) #1 (January 2019). Art by Jorge Jiménez.

Following the 2015 Convergence event, which restores the pre-Crisis on Infinite Earths multiverse, the New 52 version of Superboy does not appear. The mantle of Superboy is held by Jonathan Samuel Kent, the present-day son of Superman and Lois Lane.

Conner Kent is not reintroduced until the third volume of Young Justice in 2019, where Bart Allen encounters him while stranded in Gemworld. Conner is revealed to have been teleported to Gemworld during a confrontation at S.T.A.R. Labs. As a result, he was unaffected by the events of Flashpoint, which rebooted the main universe. After returning to his universe, Conner aids Superman and his family against Leviathan operatives. He decides to remain at the Kent farm in Smallville, as the Kents and Krypto are among the few who remember him.

=== Dawn of DC ===
Superboy begins to feel aimless living in a universe that no longer remembers him and flies into outer space, following a galactic distress signal. As of 2024, Superboy's appearance has largely returned to his 1990s look, though his 2003 retcon as a clone of both Superman and Lex Luthor remains canon. Superboy helped Superman fight Brainiac, and helps the Green Lantern Corps deal with the fractured emotional spectrum while also pursuing a relationship with a girl named Odyssey.

== Powers and abilities ==
Originally, Superboy's only superpower is "tactile telekinesis", a force field that surrounds his body and enables him to telekinetically manipulate objects via touch. Under Knockout's training, Superboy learned new ways to use his telekinesis such as projecting telekinetic force waves to blast pieces of ground and extending his field to another person. Superboy can also manipulate solid masses such as volumes of sand or dust, causing the individual particles to fly apart in an explosive manner. He can also create an air pocket around himself, enabling him to breathe in outer space. In addition, he demonstrated the ability to extend his telekinetic field around other people that he touches to make them invulnerable. In the series Teen Titans, Superboy was established to be a Kryptonian hybrid and developed Kryptonian powers while retaining his telekinesis.

== Other versions ==
- An alternate future version of Conner Kent appears in Titans Tomorrow. This version is known as Superman and regards Lex Luthor, his genetic donor, as a father figure.
- Spider-Boy, a composite character based on Superboy and Marvel Comics character Ben Reilly, appears in the Amalgam Comics universe. This version is a failed super-soldier created by Project Cadmus who possesses the ability to manipulate his own gravity, giving him a degree of superhuman strength and allowing him to run on walls.

== Legal dispute ==
A March 23, 2006 court decision returned the legal rights to Superboy to the family of Jerry Siegel, the co-creator of the character. The decision, issued six days before Superboy's death in Infinite Crisis #6 was published, states that the Siegel family have owned Superboy since November 17, 2004. As a result, Superboy was not referred to by that name for some time.

== Collected editions ==
Title	Material collected	Published date	ISBN
Superboy Book One: Trouble in Paradise	Superboy (vol. 4) #0-10	January 3, 2018	978-1401275136
Superboy: The Boy of Steel	Adventure Comics (vol. 2) #0-3, 5–6, and material from Superman: Secret Files and Origins 2009	May 17, 2011	978-1401227739
Superboy: Smallville Attacks	Superboy (vol. 5) #1-11	December 13, 2011	978-1401232511
Superboy Vol. 1: Incubation	Superboy (vol. 6) #1-7	August 7, 2012	978-1401234850
Superboy Vol. 2: Extraction	Superboy (vol. 6) #0, 8-12, Teen Titans (vol. 4) #10	May 29, 2013	978-1401240493
Superboy Vol. 3: Lost	Superboy (vol. 6) #13–19, Annual #1	December 31, 2013	978-1401243173
Superboy Vol. 4: Blood and Steel	Superboy (vol. 6) #20–25	July 2, 2014	978-1401246853
Superboy Vol. 5: Paradox	Superboy (vol. 6) #26–34, Superboy: Future's End #1	January 7, 2015	978-1401250928
Convergence: Zero Hour Book One	Convergence: Superboy #1-2 and Convergence: Justice League International #1-2, Convergence: Catwoman #1-2, Convergence: Green Arrow #1-2, Convergence: Suicide Squad #1-2	October 13, 2015	978-1401258399

== In other media ==
=== Television ===
==== Live-action ====
Lucas Grabeel as Alexander Luthor / Conner Kent in Smallville

Joshua Orpin as Conner / Subject 13 in Titans

- Conner Kent appears in the final season of Smallville, portrayed by Lucas Grabeel. This version is initially known as "Alexander Luthor" (portrayed by Jakob Davies and Connor Stanhope) as he tries to form a bond with Tess Mercer while corrupted by Lex's memories. As Conner, his powers manifest while mentored by Clark yet Lionel Luthor tries to corrupt him which Conner refuses before he enrolls at Smallville High and adopts the Kent surname.
- Conner appears in Titans, portrayed primarily by Joshua Orpin and by body double Brooker Muir in the episode "Dick Grayson". This version is also known as Subject 13. He escapes Cadmus' facility in Metropolis, kills several armed guards using heat vision and super strength, and rescues Krypto from experimentation. After saving Lionel Luthor from an armed robbery, he brutally attacks police officers, destroys vehicles, and severely injures Mercy Graves. Subjected to mind control, he later executes a violent assault on Titans Tower, leaving Jason Todd hospitalized. Eventually, he breaks free from Cadmus' control and assists the Titans in defeating Graves' forces, neutralizing several enemy operatives and shielding civilians during the final assault.

==== Animation ====
- Superboy appears in Young Justice, voiced by Nolan North. This version was created as part of Project Cadmus' "Project Kr", an attempt to create a living superweapon meant to replace or destroy Superman, with Lex Luthor's human DNA bridging missing sequences in the Kryptonian DNA to stabilize Conner and inhibit his full powers. He forms the Team with Kaldur'ahm, Dick Grayson, Miss Martian, and Wally West. Additionally, he develops romantic feelings for before entering a relationship with Miss Martian, who he later marries in the fourth season finale.
- The Young Justice incarnation of Superboy makes a non-speaking appearance in the Teen Titans Go! episode "Let's Get Serious".
- The 1993 comics incarnation of Superboy appears in the 2013 Superman 75th anniversary short produced by Zack Snyder and Bruce Timm.
- Superboy appears in Robot Chicken DC Comics Special 2: Villains in Paradise, voiced by Zac Efron. This version is implied to be the illegitimate son of Superman and Wonder Woman and is in a relationship with Lena Luthor.

=== Film ===
- Superboy makes a non-speaking appearance in the mid-credits scene of the DC Animated Movie Universe (DCAMU) film The Death of Superman.
- Superboy appears in the DCAMU film Reign of the Supermen, voiced by Cameron Monaghan. Following the events of The Death of Superman, Superboy is initially and publicly sponsored by Lex Luthor as the "official" Superman before they become disillusioned with each other as Luthor resents Superboy's grandstanding while the latter eventually learns of his true nature. His confidence buoyed by a discussion with Lois Lane, Superboy assists Steel and the Eradicator in reviving Superman before helping him fight Cyborg Superman. Afterwards, Superboy moves in with Jonathan and Martha Kent and takes on the name Connor.
- Superboy makes a cameo appearance in Teen Titans Go! To the Movies.
- Superboy makes a non-speaking appearance in the DCAMU film Justice League Dark: Apokolips War. He joins the Teen Titans in defending Earth from Darkseid's Paradooms until he is killed by them when one of them snaps his neck.

=== Video games ===
- Superboy appears as a playable character in The Death and Return of Superman.
- Superboy appears as a playable character in Lego Batman 2: DC Super Heroes.
- Superboy appears as a playable character in Young Justice: Legacy, voiced again by Nolan North.
- Superboy appears as a character summon in Scribblenauts Unmasked: A DC Comics Adventure.
- Superboy appears as a non-playable character (NPC) in DC Universe Online, voiced by Greg Miller.
- Superboy appears as a playable character in Lego Batman 3: Beyond Gotham, voiced by Scott Porter.
- Superboy makes a cameo appearance in Cyborg's ending in Injustice 2 as a member of the Teen Titans, most of whom were killed years prior, before Cyborg revives them.
- Superboy appears as a playable character in Lego DC Super-Villains, voiced by Yuri Lowenthal.

=== Miscellaneous ===
- Superboy appears in Superman Lives!, voiced by Kerry Shale.
- The Smallville incarnation of Superboy appears in Smallville Titans as a member of Jay Garrick's Teen Titans and boyfriend of Miss Martian.
- The Injustice incarnation of Superboy appears in the Injustice: Gods Among Us prequel comics as a member of the Teen Titans who survived the Joker's destruction of Metropolis. Upon learning Superman killed the Joker in retaliation, Superboy loses faith in the former and attempts to find a Phantom Zone projector, only to be defeated by Superman and sent to the Phantom Zone along with his fellow Titans.
- The Injustice incarnation of Superboy appears in the Injustice 2 prequel comic. While his fellow Titans are rescued from the Phantom Zone, Superboy opts to stay behind due to his injuries. Following General Zod's death, Batman, Doctor Mid-Nite, and Harley Quinn perform a heart transplant on Superboy using Zod's heart so he can leave the Phantom Zone and reunite with Jonathan and Martha Kent, who give him a Superman-inspired suit in the hopes that he will restore Superman's legacy. Superboy joins Batman's Insurgency in fighting Atrocitus and Starro, but he and Wonder Girl are captured and tortured by Brainiac before he leaves them to die in the vacuum of space, though Booster Gold rescues the pair so they can help the Legion of Super-Heroes.

== Reception ==
The Kon-El incarnation of Superboy has been ranked as the 196th greatest comic book character of all time by Wizard Magazine. IGN also ranked Superboy as the 83rd greatest comic book hero of all time, stating, "This genetic clone of Superman and Lex Luthor often bears the weight of the world on his burly shoulders. But over the years he's managed to carve his own legacy and win a large legion of fans." In 2013, ComicsAlliance ranked Superboy as #35 on their list of the "50 Sexiest Male Characters in Comics".

== See also ==
- Alternative versions of Superman
- Superman character and cast
