= List of Flash supporting characters =

This is a list of Flash supporting characters.

In chronological order with name, first appearance and description.

== Family tree ==
The Flash family tree

Hugo Thawne	Charlene Thawne
Bess Lynn; Miss Liberty	Nadine West	Ira West	Joan Garrick	Jay Garrick; The Flash	Henry Allen	Nora Allen
Libby Lawrence; Liberty Belle	Johnathan "Johnny" Chambers; Johnny Quick	Daniel "Danny" West; Reverse-Flash	Rudy West	Mary Brady-West	Iris Ann West-Allen	Bartholomew Henry "Barry" Allen; The Flash	Malcolm Thawne; Cobalt Blue; Thaddeus
Richard "Rick" Tyler; Hourman	Jesse Chambers; Jesse Quick / Liberty Belle	Wallace West II; Kid Flash / Impulse	Linda Jasmine Park-West	Wallace Rudolph "Wally" West I The Flash / Kid Flash	Jeven Ognats	Dawn Allen of the Tornado Twins	Don Allen of the Tornado Twins	Meloni Thawne	George "Digger" Harkness; Captain Boomerang
Iris “Irey” West II; Kid Flash / Thunderheart	Jai West; The Turtle / Surge	Wade West	Jenni Ognats; XS	Bartholomew Henry "Bart" Allen II; Kid Flash / Impulse / The Flash	Owen Mercer; Captain Boomerang
Male Allen; The Flash of the 23rd Century	Thaddeus Thawne II; Inertia / Kid Zoom
Sela Allen; The Flash of the 23rd Century	Adrian Thawne
Chardaq Allen; 23rd Century Cobalt Blue	Robern Thawne	Professor Eobard Thawne; Reverse-Flash / Zoom
Simogyn Allen
Blaine Allen; The Flash of the 28th Century
Jace Allen; 28th Century Cobalt Blue

== Golden Age ==
Character	First appearance	Description
Justice Society of America	All Star Comics #3 (Winter 1940)	A group of masked heroes that joined together to face a growing threat within America. Flash was a founding member.
Joan Williams	Flash Comics #1 (January 1940)	Jay Garrick's longtime girlfriend and, eventually, his wife.
Winky, Blinky, and Noddy	All-Flash #5 (Summer 1942)	Known as the "Three Dimwits" and several other variations, Winky, Blinky, and Noddy acted as comic relief for the Flash.
Worry Wart	All-Flash #15 (Summer 1944)	Ebenezer Jones was a man who worries too much. A family friend discovered it was actually due to a gene in Jones and made it contagious, using Jones to perform robberies. The Flash found an antidote for the so-called Worry Wart, though it would occasionally reappear.
Maria Flura	All-Flash #31 (October–November 1947)	A scientist the Flash befriended who helped him with Star Sapphire.

== Silver Age ==
Character	First appearance	Description
Dick Grayson	Detective Comics #38 (April 1940)	Serving with Wally West on the Teen Titans, Grayson would become West's best friend and act as best man at his wedding.
Iris West	Showcase #4 (September–October 1956)	A reporter and Barry Allen's girlfriend and eventual wife.
Ira West	Flash #134 (February 1963)	Iris's father and Wally's grandfather who is a bit of an absent minded professor.
Rudy West	Flash #116 (November 1960)	Wally's father, Iris's brother and Ira's son. Eventually revealed to be working for the Manhunters.
Henry Allen	Flash #126 (February 1962)	Barry Allen's father. He's a doctor.
Nora Allen	Flash #126 (February 1962)	Barry Allen's mother.
Solovar	Flash #106 (April–May 1959)	The king of Gorilla City for much of the dealings the Flash had with the culture.
Hal Jordan	Showcase #22 (October 1959)	Served with the Flash in the JLA where the unlikely pair became best friends.
Justice League of America	The Brave and the Bold #28 (February/March 1960)	Group of costumed heroes that protected the world against some of its worst threats. Barry Allen was a founding member.
Elongated Man	Flash #112 (May 1960)	A super hero and ally of the Flash who operated out of Central City.
Sue Dibny	Flash #119 (March 1961)	A socialite who dated and later married Elongated Man.
Daphne Dean	Flash #126 (February 1962)	An actress who grew up with and dated Barry Allen.
Mary West	Flash #133 (December 1962)	The mother of Wally West who moved in with him for a time.
Dexter Myles	Flash #138 (August 1963)	The curator of the Flash Museum.
Doralla Kon	Flash #145 (June 1964)	An alien from the planet Alkomar who arrived on Earth to learn while there she has super-speed.
Teen Titans	The Brave and the Bold #54 (July 1964)	A group that began as a team of sidekicks for the JLA and grew into a home for teen heroes. Wally West was a founding member.
Tornado Twins	Adventure Comics #373 (October 1968)	Don and Dawn Allen, twin son and daughter of Barry and Iris Allen who became heroes in the 30th century with their children Bart Allen and XS.

== Bronze Age ==
Character	First appearance	Description
Pied Piper	Flash #106 (May 1959)	A longtime member of the Rogues who later reforms and becomes Wally West's ally.
Fiona Webb	Flash #285 (May 1980)	A woman who dated and nearly married Barry Allen. On their wedding day, the Reverse-Flash masqueraded as the hero and nearly killed Webb, instead being killed himself by the Flash. Webb would suffer nervous breakdowns afterward at even the mention of Allen's name.
Patty Spivot	5-Star Super-Hero Spectacular (September 1977)	Barry Allen's assistant in the police lab.
Matthew Paulson	Flash #273 (May 1979)	A corrupt police chief who was Barry Allen's supervisor prior to Darryl Frye.
Darryl Frye	Flash #285 (May 1980)	A police captain for the Central City Police Department and Barry Allen's direct superior. In The New 52, Frye is Barry's foster father.
Frank Curtis	Flash #270 (April 1979)	A detective for the Central City Police Department and Barry Allen's friend.
Mack Nathan	Flash #285 (May 1980)	Mack is Barry Allen's African American neighbor and friend. His son Troy Nathan lives with him.
Cecile Horton	Flash #332 (May 1984)	Barry Allen's lawyer during his murder trial.
Cyborg	DC Comics Presents #26 (October 1980)	A close friend Wally West made from the Teen Titans.
Raven	DC Comics Presents #26 (October 1980)	Wally West had a crush on Raven which she used her magic to manipulate him to rejoin the Teen Titans. However, she would begin to have feelings for him which threatened to unleash the evil inside her.
Magenta	The New Teen Titans #17 (March 1982)	Wally West's girlfriend while he was Kid Flash, when he learned she could manipulate magnetism he tried to force her into becoming a super-hero. However, it instead pushed her growing mental illness into bipolar disorder. She would often be manipulated into acting as a super-villain and other times take part in destructive behavior on her own.
Connie Noleski	Flash Annual (vol. 2) #1 (1987)	A model who had an on-and-off again relationship with Wally West. She later dated and became engaged to Chunk.
Tina McGee	Flash (vol. 2) #3 (August 1987)	A scientist who studied Wally West and dated him for a time. She would reunite with her estranged husband and the pair work together for S.T.A.R. Labs.
Jerry McGee	Flash (vol. 2) #5 (October 1987)	Tina McGee's husband and a scientist researching how to enhance the human body. Performing tests on himself, he turned himself into a super-villain known as Speed McGee and Speed Demon. The Flash helped him get treatment and Jerry reconnected with his wife.
Red Trinity	Flash (vol. 2) #6 (November 1987)	A trio of super-heroes from Russia that formed the service Kapitalist Kouriers in the US. Their predecessor was Blue Trinity.
Lady Flash	Flash (vol. 2) ##7 (December 1987)	Formerly Christina of Blue Trinity, Vandal Savage made the villainess his slave via an addiction to cocaine and gave her a spare Flash costume wherein she took up the title "Lady Flash". When Savage ordered her to kill the Flash, she refused and joined the hero in taking the villain down. When Christina asked to become the Flash's partner however, he refused.
Chunk	Flash (vol. 2) #9 (February 1988)	A scientist who developed a long range teleportation device and, in an accident, merged with it. Forced to absorb mass such that his invention does not consume him, Chunk ran afoul of the Flash when these acts caused chaos. With the hero's help, Chunk was able to get his abilities under control, opening a waste removal business, and became a close friend to Wally West.
Mason Trollbridge	Flash (vol. 2) #15 (August 1988)	Once the sidekick to the vigilante the Clipper, Trollbridge was a neighbor to Wally West in New York, later becoming his friend (going so far as to move with Wally back to Keystone City). At one point, Trollbridge took up the mantle of the Clipper and his son became the supervillain Last Resort.
Linda Park	Flash (vol. 2) #28 (July 1989)	A reporter who dated and eventually married Wally West. They have two children, Iris (who became the hero Impulse) and Jai.

== Modern Age ==
Character	First appearance	Description
Max Mercury	National Comics #5 (November 1940)	A US Cavalry scout empowered by a Native American shaman with super-speed, Max Mercury is considered one of the foremost experts in the Speed Force. He bounced through time entering the force, appearing throughout history and mentoring speedsters.
Trickster	The Flash #113 (June–July 1960)	One of the Flash's most consistent rogues, the Trickster was brainwashed by the Top and joined the FBI. Trickster would later form a group of reformed Flash rogues to topple his current ranks of enemies until the Top removed his influence.
Top	The Flash #122 (August 1961)	One of the Flash's rogues, the Top was magically brainwashed by Zatanna into becoming a hero and would briefly be the Flash's partner. Unfortunately, his new programming clashed with his guilt over his past and he lost his mind. The Top would brainwash the Trickster, Pied Piper, and Heat Wave.
Heat Wave	The Flash #140 (November 1963)	One of the Flash's rogues, Heat Wave was brainwashed by the Top into becoming a hero and worked for Project Cadmus. He would end up at the FBI under the Trickster beside other reformed rogues before the Top removed his influence.
Keith Kenyon	Green Lantern (vol. 2) #38 (Summer 1965)	Formerly an enemy of the Green Lantern as Goldface, Kenyon reformed and became a Union boss in Keystone City.
Jesse Quick	Justice Society of America (vol. 2) #1 (August 1992)	The daughter of Johnny Quick and Liberty Belle, Jesse for a time acted as the Flash's partner and agreed to be his successor (though, this was revealed to be a ruse to inspire Bart Allen).
Argus	The Flash Annual (vol. 2) #6 (1993)	A federal agent who gained super powers, Argus became a hero and ally to the Flash in Central City.
Green Lantern (Kyle Rayner)	Green Lantern (vol. 3) #48 (January 1994)	Serving with Wally West in the JLA, the duo clashed but eventually became good friends.
XS	Legionnaires #0 (October 1994)	The granddaughter of Barry Allen and daughter of Dawn Allen of the Tornado Twins.
Preston Lindsay	Impulse #1 (April 1995)	The best friend of Bart Allen when he lived in Manchester, Alabama.
Carol Bucklen	Impulse #4 (July 1995)	Bart Allen's first love, who went to the future with him when Max Mercury was believed dead.
Mister Terrific	Spectre (vol. 3) #54 (June 1997)	Fellow Justice Leaguer and the third-smartest man in the world, who employs Wally West at his company Terrifitech.
Arrowette	Impulse #28 (August 1997)	The daughter of Miss Arrowette, Arrowette was a hero in Manchester where she befriended Bart Allen.
Young Justice	Young Justice: The Secret #1 (June 1998)	Largely made up of a new, younger generation of sidekicks to the JLA, Bart Allen was a founding member of the group.
Justice Legion Alpha	DC One Million #1 (November 1998)	The premier super hero team of the 853rd century, a time-traveling John Fox became that generation's Flash.
Angela Margolin	The Flash (vol. 2) #143 (December 1998)	A scientist who took over Barry Allen's position in the Central City police department after his absence. She would become romantically involved with the Dark Flash.
Fred Chyre	The Flash (vol. 2) #170 (March 2001)	Detective for the Keystone City police.
Jared Morillo	The Flash (vol. 2) #171 (April 2001)	A detective for the Keystone City police and Fred Chyre's partner for the Department of Metahuman Hostility. After a battle with the villain Cicada, Morillo develops an advanced healing factor that renders him nigh-immortal.
Gregory Wolfe	The Flash: Iron Heights (August 2001)	The warden of Iron Heights. He seems to have no tolerance for his inmates and is able to cause pain or comfort in others using his mind (so far as to kill dozens when pushed to his limit).
Hunter Zolomon	The Flash: Secret Files & Origins #3 (November 2001)	A talented former profiler for the FBI specializing in super-villains who became an asset for the Keystone City police. After being paralyzed from the waist down by Gorilla Grodd, Zolomon asked the Flash to go back in time and fix the agent's life (which he refused). Zolomon attempted to use the Cosmic Treadmill to go back in time himself but instead resulted in an accident turning him into the villain Zoom.
Peek-a-Boo	The Flash (vol. 2) #180 (January 2002)	A youth with the power to teleport, Lashawna Baez attempted to use her powers to steal a kidney for her ailing father. While she would be caught and battle the Flash again, she admitted she idolized the hero and wanted to also be a hero.
Ashley Zolomon	The Flash (vol. 2) #197 (June 2003)	The ex-wife of Hunter Zolomon, Ashley blamed herself for his transformation into Zoom. She took his place as the police's profiler in hopes Hunter could one day be rehabilitated.
David Singh	The Flash Secret Files and Origins #2010 (May 2010)	Barry's CCPD Crime Lab supervisor.
James Forrest	The Flash: Rebirth #2 (July 2009)	Scientist at the Central City Crime Lab.
Kristen Kramer	The Flash Secret Files and Origins #2010 (May 2010)	Intern at the Central City Crime Lab.
Owen Mercer	Identity Crisis #3 (October 2004)	The son of Captain Boomerang and half-brother of Bart Allen, Mercer largely has walked a fine line between hero and villain. He would join the Suicide Squad and helped apprehend the Rogues who killed Bart Allen.
Irey West	The Flash (vol. 2) #225 (October 2005)	Twins of Wally West and Linda Park raised in the Speed Force, with Jai getting super-strength and Iris getting speed powers. Also known as the modern "Tornado Twins".
Jai West	The Flash (vol. 2) #225 (October 2005)	Twins of Wally West and Linda Park raised in the Speed Force, with Jai getting super-strength and Iris getting speed powers. Also known as the modern "Tornado Twins".
Valerie Perez	The Flash: The Fastest Man Alive #1 (August 2006)	The daughter of Manfred Mota, Perez was once saved by Bart Allen and she would dedicate her life to studying the Speed Force. Studying him as an intern at S.T.A.R. Labs, the two would begin a romantic relationship. She would hold him in her arms as he died from his injuries at the hands of the Rogues.
The Renegades	The Flash (vol. 3) #1 (June 2010)	A police task force from the 25th century who believed Barry Allen murdered team member Mirror Monarch (which was in fact killed by the group's Top).
Wade West	The Flash #798 (May 2023)	Third child of Wally West and Linda Park, whose connection to the Speed Force was imbued in Linda while she was pregnant.
Foxy	The Flash (vol. 6) #13 (November 2024)	The dog-like offspring of the Deep Change, the embodiment of time. Foxy emanates Speed Force energy, allowing speedsters near him to maintain their powers even if they are drained.

== From alternate realities ==
Character	First appearance	Description
Vince Everett	The Flash TV Special #1 (January 1991)	A youth who broke into S.T.A.R. Labs and gained super-speed from an experiment replicating the accident that gave Barry Allen his powers. He would lose his powers as he raced the Flash around the city.

== In other media ==
Character	First appearance	Description
Henry Allen	The Flash: "Pilot" (September 20, 1990)	A retired police officer and the father of Barry Allen that was proud of his son Jay, a cop in the motorcycle division, and disappointed in his other son Barry for being a scientist. He often criticized Barry for his reliance on scientific procedure, claiming it didn't compare to actual police work.
Jay Allen	The Flash: "Pilot" (September 20, 1990)	Barry Allen's brother, Jay was a cop for the motorcycle division before his death at the hands of the Dark Riders, the motorcycle gang of Nicholas Pike, prompting Barry to become the Flash.
Julio Mendez	The Flash: "Pilot" (September 20, 1990)	Barry Allen's co-worker in the Police lab.
Michael Francis Murphy and Tony Bellows	The Flash: "Pilot" (September 20, 1990)	Partners for the police force who often appeared as comic relief.
Warren Garfield	The Flash: "Pilot" (September 20, 1990)	A police lieutenant and Barry Allen's boss.
Megan Lockhart	The Flash: "Watching the Detectives" (October 18, 1990)	A private detective who crossed paths with the Flash on occasion and the two shared an attraction.
Nightshade	The Flash: "Ghost in the Machine" (December 13, 1990)	Desmond Powell is the chief of staff of Central City Hospital and a former vigilante.
Alpha	The Flash: "Alpha" (May 11, 1991)	An android built by the US government intended to be an assassin but develops a conscience and escapes her masters. Alpha and Flash are forced to face Omega, another android tasked with capturing Alpha.
Green Lantern	Justice League of America (1997)	Barry Allen's roommate and teammate in the JLA.

== See also ==
- Flash (comic book)
- List of Flash enemies
- Rogues
