= Finish Line (comics) =

DC Comics comic book story line

- Publisher: DC Comics
- Publication date: August – September 2020
Title(s)
The Flash (vol. 5) #759–762 (4 issues)
- Main character(s): Barry Allen; Reverse-Flash (Eobard Thawne); Wallace West; Bart Allen; Iris West; Flash (Jay Garrick); Max Mercury

Creative team
- Writer: Joshua Williamson
- Artist(s): Rafa Sandoval; Scott Kolins; Christian Duce; Howard Porter
- Penciller(s): Rafa Sandoval; Christian Duce
- Letterer: Steve Wands
- Editor: Mike Cotton

"Finish Line" is a four-issue monthly American comic book story written by Joshua Williamson and illustrated by Howard Porter. The storyline was published by DC Comics and features characters from the Flash comics. The story appeared in issues #759–762 of The Flash (vol. 5), running from August to September 2020. The storyline received critical acclaim for the action, plot, art, and the ending. "Finish Line" was the final story written by Joshua Williamson before Kevin Shinick began his run on the title.

== Plot ==
=== Prelude ===
The Flash called on help from Eobard Thawne (who just killed Barry's mother Nora in the past) to help defeat a villain named Paradox who is causing damage to the Time Stream. Barry and Eobard free Godspeed from Paradox and the three of them manage to defeat Paradox, but Eobard kills Godspeed after revealing to him that he killed Godspeed's brother before escaping and creating his own Legion of Zoom. Eobard goes in the future and turns Barry's future children (the Tornado Twins) evil and the Legion of Zoom hold Barry down while Eobard vibrates into Barry, taking control of Barry's mind. Meanwhile, Barry is stuck in the Speed Force and sees zombified versions of Jesse Chambers and Max Mercury.

=== Main synopsis ===
Eobard (possessing Barry's body) meets up with Impulse (who is Eobard's ancestor) and takes him away from Young Justice to "fight" crime. Barry is about to disappear, but Jesse Chambers and Max Mercury grab a hold of Barry and Barry remembers them. Max says that they are not in the Speed Force but in a deeper plane of existence. Max and Jesse then teach Barry how to get his body back. Eobard and Impulse are fighting the Rogues when Barry briefly manages to take control of his own body. Trickster throws a bomb at Eobard, but Eobard catches it and throws it back at Trickster, shocking Impulse. Eobard insults Bart by reminding him how Bart in the past tried to be the Flash but got himself killed before leaving. It is revealed that Eobard set the whole crime up, and tells them to go find the items required to fully possess Barry's body.

Eobard meets up with Iris West, Kid Flash and Avery Ho, who were hiding from Eobard. Eobard tells them to go fight the Legion of Doom, but Impulse arrives and kicks Eobard in the face, saying that Barry Allen is never mean, and deduces Eobard as taking control of Barry Allen's body. Impulse meets with Wallace for the first time, and Iris remembers Impulse as her grandson which confuses Kid Flash due to time travel. Eobard gets back up and is about to attack when Jay Garrick arrives (due to him being free in Doomsday Clock).

Max tells Barry that his body is still tethered to Earth so he can bring him, Max, and Jesse back. Eobard defeats Impulse, Jay Garrick, Kid Flash, and Avery Ho and is about to kill Jay Garrick when Barry starts fighting back and Eobard runs off. Jay Garrick thinks that they can find Eobard due to Barry's body being connected to the speed force. The Legion of Zoom is disgusted that Eobard Thawne ordered them to extract Nora Allen's corpse. Eobard explains that Nora's body is important because her body has temporal energy, and if Eobard can extract the temporal body then Barry Allen will be gone forever. Meanwhile, Barry is attacked by a mental projection of Thaddeus Thawne (a twisted clone of Bart Allen from the future) but does not fight back, saying he feels sorry for him.

Barry realizes the only way to get back his body is to vibrate at the correct vibrational frequency. Jay Garrick, Iris, Avery, Impulse, and Kid Flash arrive at Nora's grave thanks to Trickster, and Eobard sends him back in time. Impulse successfully breaks control of the Tornado Twins brainwashing, and they fade away in the timestream. Barry successfully manages to break free of Eobard's mind control and expels Eobard out of his body, alongside Jesse Quick and Max Mercury. Eobard Thawne then goes to the past and brings many of Flash's enemies to the present to expand the Legion of Zoom, fight the Flash family, and destroy Central City.

In the 863rd century on Mercury, Kid Flash talks to another speedster (John Fox) about the Flash history, and says that on one specific day Barry and Eobard raced for one last time for unknown reasons. Barry tells Kid Flash to get Iris West to safety. Max Mercury meditates while Jay Garrick, Impulse, and Jesse Quick protect him. After a brief few seconds, a large flash appears and many speedsters from different timelines appear to help out. Impulse, Irey West, Kid Flash, and Avery create a plan to run around in circles so they can create a vibrational frequency that will return the villains go back to their timeline. Meanwhile, Eobard Thawne reveals to Barry that he was responsible for everything after researching Barry's entire life as he discovered a hypnotic frequency that allows him to manipulate anyone's thoughts he encounters, like turning Hunter Zolomon and August Heart evil, killing Nora, persuading Bart to delay his reunion with his family, manipulating Barry's personality to feel distrustful and pessimistic, trapping Jay Garrick in the timestream, causing Wallace West to exist and turning his father into the Reverse-Flash, making Kid Flash have an argument with Damian Wayne, and goading Wally West into deep despair and trauma resulting to his strained relationship with Barry and hiding evidence of his friends' death in the Sanctuary. Barry gets angry but Eobard overpowers Barry and just before he is about to kill him, a huge bolt of blue lightning hits both of them, with Barry hearing Wally's voice. Eobard is afraid, saying this has not happened in the timeline, and goes off in the Speed Force, with Barry chasing after him saying that he will kill him. Eobard tells Barry that he will go to the 25th century and try to find new ways to torture his family, stating that he and Barry will always be trapped in the loop. Eobard offers a solution: always run after him in the Speed Force, or kill him to break the loop.

Eobard tries to goad Barry into killing him again, but Barry tries something different and he forgives Eobard, which shocks him. Barry explains they're always in this loop because Eobard is stuck in the past, and Barry's hatred keeps him tethered. Eobard is angered and runs at Barry, but passes through Barry. Barry says he is sorry that he rejected Eobard when they first met, but he cannot let Eobard define his life. Barry explains he pulled in energy similar to Flashpoint and vibrated to let some of his speed go in Eobard Thawne. Thawne realizes that the only reason why he can exist in the past and still come back was that he was a paradox but Barry reset him, which causes him to disappear. Barry says goodbye to Eobard Thawne and runs off with Eobard disintegrating. This erases Eobard's experience of his life as the Reverse-Flash, leaving him as a tour guide in the Flash Museum of his home era and unaware of his villainous past. Barry goes to the 25th century to make sure before running off to the present. Barry goes to the time stream and returns the Tornado Twins, Renegades, the Rogues, and Gorilla Grodd to their place (while also erasing August Heart's tombstone) before talking to the Justice League and cleaning up Central City. Barry reveals the night Wally West returned, a woman named Heather Macy was killed and before he could investigate the Legion of Zoom attacked and the evidence was stolen, and Barry wonders why. Barry is looking at his childhood home when a woman walks up to him and starts chatting with him. Before leaving, she reveals her name is Heather Macy, but her husband's last name is Thawne (implying that she is the ancestor of Eobard Thawne) much to Barry's surprise. While everyone is having a party at Barry's house, Barry tells Iris that he heard Wally West's voice, and realizes he's alive. Iris tells Barry from Linda Park that Wally rescued their kids during his mission on rescuing the multiverse. Barry promises Iris that he will find him before getting a call from the Justice League and running off to protect the city while saying that he will always be the Flash.

== Reception ==
The overall storyline received critical acclaim for its pacing, action, art from Howard Porter and the conclusion between Eobard Thawne and Barry Allen. Michael Wayne from Comic Reviews wrote: "Overall, Finish Line was a good story that could've used some more work areas, but was an all around good read. It's got fantastic art, great storytelling, and a good ending to an epic Flash run by Joshua Williamson".

According to Review aggregator Comic Book Roundup, The Flash issue #759 received an average score of 8.7 out of 10 based on 12 reviews.

According to Comic Book Roundup, Issue 760 received an average score of 8.9 out of 10 based on 9 reviews.

According to Comic Book Roundup, Issue 761 received an average score of 9.1 out of 10 based on 11 reviews.

According to Comic Book Roundup, Issue 762 received an average score of 9.4 out of 10 based on 12 reviews.
