= The Flash: Rebirth =

American comic book limited series

- Cover for The Flash: Rebirth collected hardcover edition by Ethan Van Sciver and Alex Sinclair

Publication information
- Publisher: DC Comics
- Schedule: Monthly/Irregular
- Format: Limited series
- Publication date: April 2009 – February 2010
- No. of issues: 6
- Main character(s): Barry Allen; Iris West; Eobard Thawne; Wally West; Jay Garrick; Bart Allen; Max Mercury; Jesse Chambers

Creative team
- Written by: Geoff Johns
- Artist: Ethan Van Sciver

The Flash: Rebirth is a six-issue 2009 - 2010 monthly American comic book limited series written by Geoff Johns and illustrated by Ethan Van Sciver. The series was published by DC Comics, and features characters from throughout the nearly seventy-year-long history of Flash comics. The storyline follows the "rebirth" of the Silver Age character The Flash, Barry Allen, after his initial return in DC's 2008 crossover storyline "Final Crisis".

This is the second "rebirth" limited series issued by DC Comics, it was preceded by Green Lantern: Rebirth (2005), which reintroduced Green Lantern Hal Jordan into the DC universe. The first issue was published on April 1, 2009. The series was first planned to last for five issues, but was extended to six.

== Foreshadowing ==
In the third issue of Final Crisis: Rogues' Revenge, Libra tells the Rogues that "the Flash the Rogues first battled has come back to the land of the living". The Rogues regroup in the basement of the Flash Museum and lament the possibility of Barry Allen having returned to life, saying: "He ain't like the kid who took it up after him. He never gave us a break". Captain Cold ended the limited series by reflecting on and preparing for Barry Allen: "The Rogues can't outrun him. Once the skies are back to blue, the game's back on... and if the Flash is really back, there's no more rules in this universe to follow". The issue ends with an image of Barry Allen in his Flash uniform running extremely quickly, and the last line of the series is: "Coming next year: The Flash: Rebirth".

Ethan Van Sciver redesigned Wally West's costume for this series so that Wally and Barry could be visually distinct. Barry once again becomes the primary Flash in the mini-series. Bart Allen, the second Kid Flash and fourth Flash, was resurrected in the 31st century in Final Crisis: Legion of 3 Worlds #3 by Brainiac 5 to combat Superboy-Prime and the Legion of Super-Villains and has a large role in The Flash: Rebirth.

== Plot ==
Two forensics scientists in Central City are killed by a mysterious man wielding a spear with a lightning bolt-shaped tip. He rearranges containers of chemicals on shelves and, using the spear as a lightning rod, recreates the accident that gave Barry Allen—also known as The Flash—his powers, then escapes from arriving police officers. His thoughts indicate he is responsible for Barry Allen's return. In Central City and Keystone City, Linda Park-West announces that a celebration will be held for Barry's return. Members of the Flash family react to his return: at Justice Society headquarters, Jay Garrick recounts how Barry inspired him to return to superheroics; at Titans Tower East, Wally West remembers Barry with fondness and respect; at Titans Tower West, Bart Allen views his grandfather's return with skepticism; and Iris West-Allen waits happily for her husband to come home. However, Iris receives a phone call from Police Captain Frye, who asks for Barry's help.

Barry is visiting the Flash Museum, trying to catch up with events that occurred during his absence, when he meets Green Lantern (Hal Jordan). Barry's memories from his time in the Speed Force are fading. He feels he was not supposed to come back, and that the Speed Force is trying to draw him back in. Barry tells Hal that he will not attend the festivities in his honor, and runs off. When Barry was a child, his mother was murdered and his father was arrested for the crime, despite proclaiming his innocence. The evil super-speedster Savitar materializes out of the lightning from Barry's run. As soon as Barry catches Savitar, he receives some feedback from Savitar's energy and the villain crumbles into dust. At the same moment, all of the heroes connected to the Speed Force experience a sudden, painful discharge of energy.

Jordan quarantines Savitar's remains upon arrival, and Barry hurries home to talk to Wally about the deceased villain. In his eye, Barry sees a police car outside Wally's Aunt Iris' house and remembers the day they first met—the same day he gained his powers—after the trial of Sam Scudder. In a flashback it is revealed that even after the death of his father in prison, Barry continued investigating his mother's murder and hoped to prove his father's innocence. Barry arrives and meets with Captain Frye. Thanks to Wonder Woman and her government connections, the public believes that Barry has been in witness protection during the years he was missing. Barry receives a phone call from Wally and learns of the "speed seizures" the other super-speedsters have experienced.

Barry and Wally investigate a mysterious lightning storm in Fallville, Iowa, and discover the remains of the Black Flash. The pair are attacked by Lady Flash, but she disintegrates in the same fashion as Savitar as Barry touches her. Barry's costume begins to transform into that of the Black Flash. At the Justice Society's headquarters, Jesse Chambers is contemplating a statue of her parents, Johnny Quick and Liberty Belle. Her husband Rick Tyler confronts her, an explosion occurs in front of them, and an image of Johnny Quick materializes, begs Barry Allen not to hurt Jesse, then vanishes.

In Fallville, the Justice League, the Justice Society, and other heroes have built a containment chamber for Barry, whose personal energy field has become tainted with a black aura that burns through speed energy. The heroes plan to disconnect Barry from the Speed Force to save his life. Iris acts as Barry's "lightning rod" to prevent him from being reabsorbed into the Speed Force. After remembering their first date, Barry's energy field overloads and destroys the chamber. Green Lantern creates a new chamber with his ring and carries Barry away from the other Flashes. Barry breaks out, achieves a safe distance from the other speedsters, and begins to run. He plans to run back into the Speed Force to spare his friends and family. Despite Superman's attempt to stop him, Barry achieves the speed he needs to escape the material plane.

As Barry re-enters the Speed Force, he sees past events of his life in reverse, but begins to lose his memories and his individuality. With help from a mysterious voice, Barry regains his memories and fully enters the Speed Force. Barry discovers Max Mercury and Johnny Quick, who are imprisoned in the Speed Force. Johnny grabs Barry's wrist and pleads with him not to let the force hurt Jesse. Barry's energy kills Johnny. Before he and Max are pulled into a red area of the Speed Force, Max tells Barry that he is not responsible for the deaths of the speedsters. The true villain reveals himself: Professor Eobard "Zoom" Thawne, the Reverse-Flash, boasts that he has shifted Barry into reverse.

When Barry questions Zoom's return, the villain says that he will be resurrected in a near-future event—as Zoom's corpse is still buried in the present. As Zoom beats Barry and Max, he reveals that the red energy field is a "negative Speed Force" created by Thawne's kinetic energy, and is poisoning the normal Speed Force. Zoom reveals his plan: after Barry briefly returned to aid Kid Flash against Superboy-Prime during the Infinite Crisis, Zoom sent a subliminal pulse into the Speed Force to draw back the remains of Barry's self-awareness, which led to Barry's reappearance during the Final Crisis. Zoom then transformed himself into a new kind of speedster—the mysterious murderer seen at the beginning of the story—and created his negative Speed Force to contaminate Barry and the other heroic speedsters. Zoom fades away.

In Fallville, Wally decides to enter the Speed Force to retrieve his uncle. At the Wests' home, Irey wants to help save Barry. After an argument with her brother Jai, she runs downstairs and encounters the reappearing Zoom. At the Justice Society's headquarters, Hourman is tending to Jesse, who has been repeating her father's Speed Formula. As Wally ventures deeper into the Speed Force, Max tells Barry that it was Allen who created the speedsters' source of power. Barry unknowingly created the Speed Force using kinetic energy throughout his career. Zoom seizes Jai and Irey and begins to mainline the pair's distorted connections to the Speed Force. Linda calls for help, and Jay Garrick and Bart Allen attack him but Zoom overpowers them. In the Speed Force, Wally reaches Barry and Max. Max is unconvinced he can escape due to his lack of a "lightning rod". Barry convinces Max that he is like family to them, and the three begin to escape.

Jesse Chambers, now crackling with Speed Force energy, stops repeating the Speed Formula. As the heroic speedsters are recharged with energy, Barry, Wally, Jay, Max, and Bart charge towards Thawne and battle Zoom. Irey and Jai are painfully wracked with speed energy. Irey realizes that their powers are unstable because they have been sharing the same connection to the Speed Force. She absorbs her brother's speed energy into herself and passes out. Jesse Chambers arrives and revives Irey by reciting her Speed Formula. Jesse and Iris join the battle against Zoom, Irey now displays traditional super-speed. Wally uses his connection to the Speed Force to rejuvenate the speedsters and repair their suits: Barry, Jay, Max, and Bart retain their normal costumes, while Wally slightly modify his with a new cowl and emblem, Jesse wears a costume based on her father's, and Irey becomes the new Impulse.

Despite being outnumbered, Zoom remains confident and notes how the Speed Force affects the aging of the Flash family. He boasts of being responsible for all the tragedies of Barry's life, including the murder of his mother and the framing of his father. Zoom says that Barry's parents had been happy together in the original timeline. Thawne claims that his negative Speed Force gave him the ability to alter the past. Zoom begins to travel through time again, and announces his intention to kill Iris before her first date with Barry. By doing so, he hopes to wipe all memory of Iris from Barry's history. Barry and Wally chase after Thawne. Wally tells Barry to push hard to break the time barrier. They reach Thawne and become the lightning bolt that turns Barry into the Flash and stop Thawne from killing Iris. They chase Thawne, who to dissuade Wally, tells him that one of his children will make his life miserable in the future. Barry and Wally push Thawne back through time. Barry and Wally return to the present where the other superheroes have built a device for Thawne. Barry tosses Thawne into it and Jay activates the device, which severs Thawne's connection to the Negative Speed Force. Barry and Wally tie-up Thawne. Iris discovers Thawne's weapon in the past and keeps it. With the threat ended, everyone celebrates and welcomes back Barry and the speedsters.

Dr. Alchemy escapes from Iron Heights Penitentiary, where Hunter Zolomon talks to Thawne, hoping they can work together. In Gorilla City, an ape warns that Thawne has done something horrible to their jungles. In Central City Police Precinct, Barry closes the case on his mother's death and opts to take all the other cold cases. Elsewhere, the Rogues prepare to deal with Barry. Barry spends some time with Iris then goes to Washington to celebrate his return with the Justice League.

== Aftermath ==
With Barry Allen retold origin and his continuity, The Flash: Rebirth sets the stage for Flashpoint where Barry travels back in time to save his mother's life which alters the timeline, resulting in New 52 reboot and DC Rebirth continuity. Following his retelling origin, The Flash: Rebirth made historical changes to Flash's mythos following his first appearance in Showcase #4 to his sacrificial death on Crisis on Infinite Earths up to his time travel impact on Flashpoint. The Flash serves at the forefront of the DC universe following his revival of the Flash mythos. The origin of the Speed Force was created by accident when Barry got struck by a bolt of lightning gaining super-speed proving that Barry is the main source to all speedsters from past, present, and future. Thawne was aware of Barry's existence and that without Barry's presence, Thawne would be erased from the timestream which explains why he chose to spare Barry and instead ruined his life following the death of Barry's mother.

The origin of Thawne's grudge against Barry Allen was later retconned including his early life which led down his path to becoming Flash's greatest enemy. With the creation of the Negative Speed Force and his presence on Flashpoint, Thawne later becomes the living paradox, a being without a past or future. He usually resurrected himself after suffering multiple deaths.

During Joshua Williamson's run on the Flash Age storyline, the villain named Paradox is well aware of Flash's altering timeline and accuses him of his transformation, planning to destroy him and his timeline. Aftermath, Thawne successfully alters Paradox's history and restores the timeline. In Finish Line event, Barry forgives Thawne and apologizes for his suffering, in which he alters Thawne's timelines and erases him from his history as the Reverse-Flash.

== Reception ==
The first printing of The Flash: Rebirth issue #1 sold out at Diamond Comic Distributors on the first day of its release. A second printing with a variant cover was immediately commissioned to be released on April 29, 2009. Third and fourth printings were later announced, followed by a fifth printing. The second issue has also had a second printing commissioned.

The first issue, and the whole series, received positive reviews. Newsarama said that Johns' take on Barry Allen as particularly interesting: "Johns' main strength in Flash is the same he had with Green Lantern: he knows what makes Barry Allen tick. While Hal is a study in recklessness and charismatic defiance, Barry is a little more down-to-earth. This man refused to believe the line between good and evil blurred like the scarlet and gold he wore. Me thinks this might be a theme, one that may even be as resonant as overcoming fear".

The series has been subject to criticism due to several delays in release. While issues #1, 2 and 3 all came out as scheduled, issue #4 was subject to nearly a month of delays and was released about 12 weeks after issue #3. The fifth issue experienced similar delays, and was released in late November 2009. The final issue was then rescheduled for release in late December 2009, then was delayed until late January 2010, and again delayed until March 24, 2010. It was rescheduled with a release date of February 24, 2010.
