= Flash War =

Series by Williamson & Porter (2018)

The Flash: Rebirth

Publication information
- Publisher: DC Comics
- Schedule: Monthly
- Format: Limited series
- Publication date: May – July 2018
- No. of issues: 7
- Main character(s): Barry Allen; Wally West; Wallace West; Bart Allen; Hunter Zolomon; Iris West

Creative team
- Written by: Joshua Williamson
- Artist: Howard Porter (artist)

Flash War is a seven issue monthly American comic book limited series written by Joshua Williamson and illustrated by Howard Porter. The series was published by DC Comics, and features characters from the Flash comics. The story is from Flash Vol 5 Issue 45 to 50, with the epilogue being Flash Vol 5 Issue 51. The series ran from May to July 2018. The storyline received generally positive reviews for the plot, action, and art.

== Synopsis ==
=== Road to Flash War ===
Wally West managed to break free from Doctor Manhattan and reunited with Barry Allen and his Titans teammates. During Dark Nights: Metal storyline, Batman saw visions of Barry Allen and Wally West fighting. In a previous storyline, Eobard Thawne was resurrected by the Negative Speed Force, beat Wallace West up, and took Iris West to the future where she learns about Barry's life as the Flash. After Barry was infected by the Negative Speed Force and nearly kills Eobard Thawne, Iris West took a weapon and vaporized Eobard Thawne, seemingly killing him.

In The Lazarus Contract, Wallace West learns more about Wally West and his connection to Barry and Iris. During The Perfect Storm storyline, after the Flash family save Central City from Gorilla Grodd, Wally finally meets up with Iris and Iris remembers Wally as her nephew (the son of her brother Rudy). When Iris asked Wally what happened to his kids, Wally gets a seizure where he remembers his children Irey West and Jai West. Wally starts running around but after talking with Barry he calms down. Meanwhile, Hunter Zolomon has secretly manipulated the Renegades to go after Iris West after she killed Eobard Thawne because he believes that he can make both Flashes better if they go to war.

=== Main plot ===
While Iris, Barry, Wally, and Wallace are in the garage, the Renegades (heroic counterparts of Barry's Rogue gallery) arrive and demand the arrest of Iris West for killing Eobard.

Wally takes Iris and runs, which leads to a chase. During the fight, Golden Guardian (heroic counterpart of Golden Glider) sends out fear constructs of Eobard Thawne, Hunter Zolomon, and Daniel West. This causes Wally to have a Temporal Seizure and a brief feedback calms the group down. Commander Cold (heroic counterpart of Captain Cold) offers to help, as long as Iris also comes. Everyone agrees to go and they arrive in the 25th Century. They all arrive to the Temporal Courts, but during travel, Wally seemingly gets separated from the rest and ends up at the Flash Museum, where he meets Zoom (Hunter Zolomon).

Back in the Flash Museum, Hunter tells Wally he wants to help him. Wally learns of Hunter's part in his previous life and suspects Hunter has taken his kids. Hunter assures him he is a changed man and hasn't done anything wrong. Back at the Temporal Courts, Barry believes someone is after his family and begins a pursuit after them.

Hunter continues to try to persuade Wally and, with the arrival of Barry, proves successful. Hunter tells him others are trapped in the Speed Force, and Wally believes him. Hunter says the only way to free them is to break the Speed Force. Despite Barry's disapproval, Wally agrees. He runs off and Barry follows.

While being surrounded by Commander Cold, Iris West and Wallace West, Hunter shows his true colors by deceiving Commander Cold and teleporting away, causing the 25th Century to begin to crumble. Barry catches up to Wally. The two start an argument about what to do; Barry disapproving of his methods and Wally persisting. Barry says that there has to be another way, but Wally says that if Barry does not help him, he will make sure Barry will never run again. Wally then runs away and Barry runs after him, starting a race between the two.

As Barry and Wally race across the world, Steve Trevor and Amanda Waller call on the Justice League to stop their feud. Superman tries catching up to them, but he is too slow while Hal Jordan creates a construct that vibrates at the right moment in order to slow them down, but the Flashes easily break through the construct while heavily damaging Green Lantern's ring. Wally continues to believe Hunter, and Barry is helpless to dissuade him. Around the world, the natural forces are wreaking havoc.

The two run as fast as they can (with Wally outrunning Barry at the last moment) and soon cause a massive disruption in the Speed Force. They meet up with the Justice League and Titans as they are soon taken out by Zoom. He explains he lied to Wally to get them both to break the force barrier so he can get more power. He says he has seen the future and needs a hero to be there to save everyone from it. He shows off the brand new Strength Force and Sage Force he acquired, puts on Barry's old flash suit, and claims himself as "The Flash".

Hunter Zolomon fights off Barry and Wally, blaming them for his misfortunes. Hunter Zolomon says he broke the Flash family, and runs in the Speed Force to go back in time and fix everything. Wallace West, Iris West and Commander Cold are in a pocket dimension after the 25th century Central City is gone, and Wallace starts running. While chasing after Hunter, Wally nearly gets distracted by the past but Barry makes him focus. They arrived in the 25th century, and Barry is shocked that Iris, Wallace, and Commander Cold are gone. Hunter Zolomon beats up the Flashes and nearly kills Wally, but Wally uses his temporal seizure to harm Hunter Zolomon while saying that they used to be friends.

Barry realizes that Wally's temporal seizures hurt Hunter Zolomon, and Wally says he does not know if he can catch up to Hunter, as well as afraid that he will lose his memories of his family. Barry tells Wally that he should embrace his memories of his family, his connection to his past is his greatest gift, and Wally is the fastest man alive. This gives Wally enough power to catch up to Hunter Zolomon and beat him. Barry lands back in present day Central City where Wallace West arrives with Iris and Commander Cold. Wallace is angry at Barry for leaving them alone in the 25th century, while Commander Cold says the Force Barrier is a mess, which means the Speed Force isn't stable and no one can go back in time. Wally West lands in Mount Hood, Oregon where Barry finds him, where Wally realizes that Hunter Zolomon won. Wally West, angry at himself, starts running to get his mind of what happened, and Bart Allen emerges from the Speed Force.

==== Epilogue ====
Wally West has been running non-stop, with Iris and Barry worrying for him. Wallace West leaves Barry to live with Damian Wayne at Titans headquarters because Wallace is still angry that Barry did not tell him that he did not exist after Flashpoint, and is a "product" of his mistake. Barry and Iris sit on a bench and wait for Wally. Wally arrives in front of them after running for three days non-stop, and has a breakdown. After some talking with Barry and Iris, they convince Wally to go to the Sanctuary where he can hopefully rehabilitate. Superman and Wonder Woman arrive to take him there, and Wally says goodbye to Barry and Iris.

== Reception ==
The story received generally positive reviews due to the action, plot, and art.

- According to Comic Book Roundup, Issue 45 received an average score of 8.8 out of 10 based on 15 reviews.
- According to comic book roundup, Issue 46 received an average score of 8.3 out of 10 based on 20 reviews.
- According to Review aggregator Comic Book roundup, Issue 47 received an average score of 8.4 out of 10 based on 21 reviews.
- According to Comic Book Roundup, Issue 48 received an average score of 9 out of 10 based on 18 reviews.
- According to comic book roundup, Issue 49 received an average score of 8.3 out of 10 based on 19 reviews.
- According to Comic book roundup, Issue 50 received an average score of 8.6 out of 10 based on 23 reviews.
- According to Comic Book Roundup, Issue 51 received an average score of 8.2 out of 10 based on 19 reviews.
