= Eobard Thawne =

DC Comics supervillain

- Splash art from The Flash #761 (September 2020). Art by Howard Porter.

Publication information
- Publisher: DC Comics
- First appearance: The Flash #139 (September 1963)
- Created by: John Broome; Carmine Infantino

In-story information
- Full name: Eobard Thawne
- Species: Metahuman
- Team affiliations: Secret Society of Super Villains; Injustice League; Legion of Doom; The Rogues; The Acolytes of Zoom; Legion of Zoom
- Notable aliases: Reverse-Flash; Professor Zoom; Zoom; Black Flash; Adrian Zoom; Barry Allen; The Flash
- Abilities: Genius-level intellect Negative Speed Force grants: See list: Superhuman speed; Time and dimensional travel; Cellular regeneration and accelerated healing; Intangibility; Sonic shockwave projection; Vortex generation; Memory and speed absorption; Age alteration; Electrokinesis; Power absorption; Cosmic awareness; Molecular acceleration; Reality alteration; Retrocognition

Eobard Thawne, also known as the Reverse-Flash or Professor Zoom, is a supervillain appearing in American comic books published by DC Comics. Created by John Broome and Carmine Infantino, the character first appeared in The Flash #139 (September 1963) and has since endured as the archenemy of Barry Allen / The Flash. Eobard Thawne, as introduced by name in The Flash #153, is the first and most well-known character to assume the Reverse-Flash mantle, and is additionally a descendant of Malcolm Thawne and ancestor of Bart Allen, Thaddeus Thawne and Owen Mercer.

In his post-Crisis on Infinite Earths comic book appearances, Professor Eobard Thawne is depicted as a scientist from the 25th century who originally idolized the Flash. He replicated the accident that gave the Flash his powers, but was driven insane and became obsessed with ruining the Flash's life upon learning that he was destined to become his greatest enemy–the Reverse-Flash. Fueled by jealousy and hatred, Thawne travels throughout time to torment and destroy the Flash's life. He has been established as one of the fastest speedsters in the DC Universe. Thawne has frequently died, but has made multiple returns through resurrections and time travel.

The character has been adapted in various media incarnations, including films, television series, and video games. Tom Cavanagh and Matt Letscher portrayed the character in The CW's Arrowverse franchise, most notably in the television series The Flash.

== Fictional character biography ==
Eobard Thawne's debut as seen on the cover of The Flash #139 (September 1963).

Eobard Thawne found a time capsule in the 25th century containing a costume of the Flash and with a Tachyon device amplified the suit's speed energy, giving himself speedster abilities. Reversing the costume's colors, he adopted the moniker of "Professor Zoom the Reverse-Flash" and went on a crime spree. However, the time capsule also contained an atomic clock which, due to the effects of time travel, altered into an atomic bomb. To prevent its detonation, Barry Allen pursued and defeated Zoom, hoping he knew where the clock was. He did not, but Barry later found the clock, detonated it safely, and destroyed Thawne's costume.

Blaming the Flash for his defeat, Thawne became obsessed with "replacing" Barry and traveled back in time to exact his revenge. Iris West rejected his romantic pursuits, so Thawne killed Iris. After Barry had found love again, Thawne threatened to kill Fiona Webb (Barry's fiancée) on their wedding day. Fearful that history was repeating itself, Barry killed Thawne by breaking his neck.

=== Post-Crisis and Zero Hour origin ===
Prior to discovering the time capsule containing the Flash's costume, the Post-Crisis extended origin storyline "The Return of Barry Allen" revealed that Thawne was once a scientist obsessed with his idol, even undergoing cosmetic surgery to resemble his hero. Obtaining the Cosmic Treadmill from an antique shop, Thawne gained all of the Flash's powers after replicating the electrochemical accident behind the Flash. Seeking to use the Cosmic Treadmill to travel back in time and meet his idol, Thawne arrived at the Flash Museum several years after Barry's death, discovering that he was destined to be "Professor Zoom, the Reverse-Flash" and die at his idol's hands. As a result, the unstable Thawne convinced himself that he was Barry Allen (based on his intimate knowledge of his idol's life from his reading of an as-yet-unpublished biography) and subsequently attacked Central City for "forgetting him". Wally West ultimately tricked Thawne into returning to the 25th century with no memory of the incident. Despite this, Thawne still managed to bring the remains of his older self's costume with him, cluing him further into his destiny.

After the events of Zero Hour: Crisis in Time!, it is revealed that Malcolm Thawne is a distant ancestor and Barry's long-lost twin brother, meaning that Barry is Eobard's great-uncle, many generations removed.

=== The Flash: Rebirth ===
In 2009, Thawne was re-imagined as a major villain in the DC Universe by writer Geoff Johns in The Flash: Rebirth. His resurrection is foreshadowed to occur in a near-future event. It is later revealed that Thawne's recreation of the accident behind Barry's powers made Thawne able to lure Barry out of the Speed Force during Final Crisis and temporarily turn his nemesis into the Black Flash.

When Thawne reappears, he murders the revived Johnny Quick, before proceeding to trap Barry and the revived Max Mercury inside the negative Speed Force. Thawne then attempts to kill Wally's children through their Speed Force connection in front of Linda Park, only to be stopped by Jay Garrick and Bart Allen. Thawne defeats Jay and prepares to kill Bart, but Barry, Max, Wally, and Jesse Quick arrive and stop him. In the ensuing fight, Thawne reveals that he is responsible for every tragedy that has occurred in Barry's life, including Nora Allen's death. Thawne then decides to destroy everything Barry holds dear by killing Iris before the two even meet.

As Barry chases after Thawne, Wally joins Barry in the time barrier. The two Flashes reach Thawne and in doing so, they become the lightning bolt that turns Barry into a speedster as they are able to stop Thawne from killing Iris. The two Flashes push Thawne back through time, showing his past and future while the two return to the present, where the Justice League, the Justice Society, and the Outsiders have built a device originally intended to disconnect Barry from the Speed Force as the Black Flash. Barry tosses Thawne in and Jay activates the device, severing his connection to the negative Speed Force. As the Flashes tie him up to stop him from running, Iris discovers Thawne's weapon back in the past, which Iris keeps.

In the present, he is imprisoned in Iron Heights Penitentiary. Hunter Zolomon speaks to him, saying they can help each other be better. In Gorilla City, one of the apes warns that he has done something horrible to their jungles, but just what he has done is something even they do not know.

=== Blackest Night ===
In the 2009–2010 storyline "Blackest Night", the pre-Crisis version of Thawne is reanimated as a member of the Black Lantern Corps. The black power ring downloaded the corpse's memories, resulting in him not knowing of Barry's death and resurrection. Declaring himself the "Black Flash", he hunts down and attacks Barry who manages to elude him for the moment. When the Black Lantern Rogues attack Iron Heights, the living Thawne is encountered and the Black Lanterns' rings malfunction, displaying a strange symbol. When Thawne's corpse approaches his living counterpart, he stops moving and is frozen by Captain Cold's "cold grenade". Thawne's corpse is brought back to life by the white light of creation, and manages to escape.

In the follow-up "Brightest Day" storyline, the present Professor Zoom is still imprisoned in Iron Heights. When Deadman activates the White Power Battery, the Life Entity speaks to the 12 heroes and villains resurrected in "Blackest Night" and tells each of them of their mission that must be accomplished to restore 'life' to the universe and prevent the Blackest Night from ever reoccurring. Thawne becomes the first to inadvertently fulfill his mission, which occurred in the events of The Flash: Rebirth when he freed Allen from the Speed Force following the resurrection. The Entity proclaims Thawne has completed his task and his life is restored. Thawne is released from Iron Heights by Captain Boomerang who had hoped to better understand his version of the Entity's message. Thawne does not answer him directly, giving a cryptic response and eventually escaping as Captain Boomerang is confronted by the rest of the Rogues.

=== Post-Infinite Crisis origin ===
Thawne uses his powers to completely rewrite his own history; he erases his younger brother from existence and kills his parents when they try to interfere with his research. Thawne later falls in love with Rose, a reporter who had been hired to interview him, thus his future self wipes all of the reporter's romantic interests from existence. After finding out his would-be love interest did not return his affections, Thawne's future self traumatized the reporter as a child, causing the woman to be mute and institutionalized so that they never met each other. He later had his younger self find the time capsule containing his idol's costume to make himself the Flash of the 25th century. He sheds a tear as his altered past self runs past him while saying "It won't last long. You will never find love. You will never be the Flash. Barry Allen destroyed my future. It's time I destroyed his".

=== Flashpoint ===
In the 2011 Flashpoint storyline, a new timeline is created through the alteration of history. Thawne reveals that his body is permanently connected to the Speed Force, enabling him to create a negative version, with which he escaped prison. He was unable to alter Barry's transformation into a speedster, however, as that would effectively erase himself from existence. Instead, Thawne decides to ruin his nemesis's life during Barry's childhood, killing Nora Allen. Thawne later reveals that the Flashpoint timeline was created when Barry went back in time to stop him from killing Nora. After Thawne is killed by this reality's Batman with a sword stab through the chest, Barry travels back in time to stop Barry's younger self from altering history but instead, under Pandora's manipulations, a third, new timeline is created, in which DC Comics' continuity takes place from 2011 onward.

=== DC Rebirth origin ===
Thawne's origin is revised once again in the DC Rebirth relaunch. An only child when his parents died in an accident, Thawne grew up obsessed with the Flash. After finding a time capsule with the speedster's costume, he uses traces of the Speed Force in it to turn himself into a version of the Flash. Due to a lack of threats in the 25th century, Thawne creates his own by endangering people, before "saving" them. He is overjoyed when Barry travels to his time and teaches him new tricks, but this deceit is soon found out. After Barry defeats him and has him arrested, Thawne promises to rehabilitate himself, to that end undergoing therapy and being a professor. He also eventually becomes the curator of the Flash Museum. Seeking to show Barry how much he's changed and be a partner, Thawne travels to the past. However, he is enraged after he witnesses Barry give Wally a talk on how "every second is a gift", similar to one that Barry gave him, and realises that he was not treated specially by Barry. Still seeking to spend time with Barry and be a friend, Thawne becomes the Reverse-Flash, vowing to making Barry's life a living hell until his nemesis learns to "make time" for him.

=== The Button ===
Textless cover of Batman (vol. 3) #22 (July, 2017). Art by Jason Fabok (pencils/inks) and Brad Anderson (colors).

Leading up to the 2017 The Button crossover, Thawne returns with his pre-New 52 memories restored after a mysterious wave of energy strikes his alternate self, and he recalls being killed by Thomas Wayne during Flashpoint. Seeking revenge, Thawne attacks Bruce Wayne in the Batcave and destroys Thomas's letter. Thawne beats and taunts Bruce before picking up the Comedian's smiley-face pin, which teleports him to an unknown location. Thawne is teleported back to the Batcave, having been bathed in radiation by a mysterious entity. As he collapses, Thawne says "God...I saw...God." Batman and Barry later come across Thawne in possession of the Button shortly before his apparent death, and follow him in an attempt to prevent it. As he follows the traces leading to the entity, Thawne muses that he may go back in time to raise his nemesis as a "family friend" after killing Nora, but is killed by Doctor Manhattan and teleported back to the Batcave.

In the aftermath of The Button, Thawne's corpse is taken to S.T.A.R. Labs, but he is resurrected via his connection to the Negative Speed Force and returns to the future, to examine the difference between the pre and post-Flashpoint timelines. He is present at Iris's house when Iris arrives with Ace West, who Thawne beats and denounces as a fake, before kidnapping Iris and bringing her to the 25th century. Barry arrives and is quickly beaten by Thawne, who reveals his identity as the Flash to Iris. Thawne subsequently shows the couple's future and tricks Barry into being trapped in the Negative Speed Force, but his nemesis gets connected to it and escapes. Thawne implores Barry to "ditch the loser sidekicks" and become his friend and partner, but Barry refuses and strips him of his speed. Nevertheless, Thawne vows to regain his powers and keep coming back to torment Barry, before being killed by Iris with a vaporisation gun.

=== Flash War and return to Flashpoint ===
In the 2018 event Flash War, Hunter Zolomon sends the Renegades to arrest Iris for Thawne's death, as part of a plan to instigate a conflict between Barry and Wally. It is revealed that, after being freed from prison by Captain Boomerang in Brightest Day, Thawne broke Zolomon out of prison and took him to the 25th century, accepting his offer to work together. The pair secretly took over the Temporal Courts and formed the Renegades, but eventually had a falling out over a difference in motives, culminating in Thawne returning to the past. Thawne's repeated deaths infuriated Zolomon, triggering a change in his own motives. Zolomon discovers Thawne had given the gun to the Clown, thus Thawne was responsible for his successor's transformation into Zoom.

It is later revealed that Thawne pulled Thomas out of the Flashpoint timeline just as Manhattan erased it, to torment Thomas with the reality where Bruce is Batman. Thawne is briefly resurrected again in the 2022 storyline Flashpoint Beyond, when Bruce restores the Flashpoint timeline. Thawne seeks out Thomas, who had also been sent back to that timeline, but is murdered by Martha Wayne / Joker shortly afterwards.

Barry is forced to recruit Eobard Thawne and Godspeed to fight a villain named Paradox. He then kills Godspeed while revealing that he was the one who killed his brother before escaping and taking over Barry's body. In the final battle, Godspeed reveals that he subtly influenced Wally's actions during Flash War and Heroes in Crisis. Barry eventually defeats Eobard seemingly permanently by forgiving Eobard for his mother's death to let go of the toxic cycle. Barry phases when Eobard tries to attack him, transferring some of his speed force to Eobard which nullifies Eobard's ability to change the timeline without consequences. This erases Eobard's experiences as Reverse Flash, leaving him as a tour guide in the 25th century.

=== DC All In ===
In Simon Spurrier's run on Flash, there is an entity called the Crown of Thawnes which is a manifestation of all Reverse Flashes from different universes who want Wally to destroy the timeline. With the help of the Flash family, Wally is able to stop the Crown of Thawnes for good.

== Powers and abilities ==
Eobard Thawne already possessed genius-level intellect by the standards of the 25th century even prior to gaining his metahuman abilities, making him possibly one of the smartest individuals when in the 21st century. The Flash: Rebirth revealed that duplicating the accident behind Barry Allen's powers corrupted the Speed Force which created a negative version. The Reverse-Flash is therefore able to travel at superhuman speeds faster than the speed of light, deliver blows of extreme force by hitting the victim hundreds of times a second, run on water, generate vacuums, create afterimages ("speed mirages") of himself, and vibrate his molecules to pass through solid objects. Unlike original Speed Force users, Thawne has the ability to travel through and manipulate time, being able to drastically alter history and completely erase people from existence (other speedsters cannot change the past without dramatic consequences). Thawne developed numerous new powers in the events leading up to Flashpoint, including the ability to cross over to other dimensions, create shock waves across time and space at the snap of his fingers, absorb another's memories via physical contact, and alter the age of anyone or anything. Thawne has also displayed superhuman strength, as well as electrokinetic abilities. The presence of his lightning is able to disrupt and fry nearby electronics, in addition to allowing him to manipulate magnetism. The events of Flashpoint turned him into a "living paradox", making him immune to timeline alterations and unable to be erased from existence. In the DC Rebirth relaunch, Thawne also gains the abilities to possess others, by phasing into their bodies, and to hypnotize others, by whispering at hyperspeed to implant subconscious suggestions into their minds.

== Other versions ==
- Several alternate universe versions of Eobard Thawne appear in Impulse #35, such as one who became a scientific advisor to dictator Julian Tremain, one who joined a rebellion against Tremain, and one who was a gorilla in a modern society identical to that of ancient Egypt.
- An alternate universe version of Eobard Thawne appears in The New 52. This version gained the ability to manipulate time after being struck by lightning. Believing himself to have been "chosen" by the Speed Force as the Flash's replacement, Thawne dons a costume similar to the hero's and begins to terrorize the Gem Cities.
- An alternate universe version of Eobard Thawne who became the leader of the Legion of Zoom appears in Finish Line. Barry infuses him with Speed Force energy, rewriting history so that he never became a villain and is instead the curator of the Flash Museum.
- An alternate universe version of Zoom from the Dark Multiverse appears in Tales from the Dark Multiverse.
- Eobard Thawne / Reverse-Flash appears in DC X Sonic the Hedgehog.
- An alternate universe version of Eobard Thawne appears in Absolute Flash. This version was a mad scientist from the 1940s who disappeared while conducting experiments on a pocket dimension called the Still Point. In the present, his granddaughter Dr. Elenore Thawne is the lead scientist of a government program called Project Olympus and, in the one-shot Absolute Evil, joined the Justice League. Additionally, Eobard eventually returns, having absorbed the Still Point's energy over the decades and transformed into a monster.

== In other media ==
=== Television ===
- Eobard Thawne / Professor Zoom appears in the Batman: The Brave and the Bold episode "Requiem for a Scarlet Speedster!", voiced by John Wesley Shipp.
- Eobard Thawne / Reverse-Flash appears in series set in The CW's Arrowverse, portrayed by Tom Cavanagh in the form of Harrison Wells, and Matt Letscher in his original likeness. The character is introduced and featured most prominently in The Flash. He also appears in the spin-off series Legends of Tomorrow and the crossover events "Crisis on Earth-X" and "Elseworlds".
- Eobard Thawne / Professor Zoom appears in Robot Chicken, voiced by Seth Green and Tom Cavanagh.
  - Thawne also appears in Robot Chicken DC Comics Special 2: Villains in Paradise and Robot Chicken DC Comics Special III: Magical Friendship, voiced by Matthew Senreich in the former and with no dialogue in the latter. This version is a member of the Legion of Doom.
- Eobard Thawne / Reverse-Flash makes non-speaking cameo appearances in Harley Quinn as a member of the Legion of Doom.

=== Film ===
- Eobard Thawne / Professor Zoom appears in films set in the DC Animated Movie Universe, voiced by C. Thomas Howell.
  - First appearing in Justice League: The Flashpoint Paradox, he attempts to kill the Flash via the Rogues, but is thwarted by his nemesis and the Justice League. Despite this, Zoom taunts the Flash over Nora Allen's death before Superman takes the former to prison. After the Flash creates the "Flashpoint" timeline and fails to restore the original, Zoom returns to reveal that as long as he is alive, the Flash cannot draw enough energy from the Speed Force to travel through time again. However, Batman shoots Zoom, allowing the Flash to undo the "Flashpoint" timeline.
  - In Suicide Squad: Hell to Pay, immediately after Batman shot him, Zoom drew energy from the Speed Force to slow down the moment of his death and survive into the new timeline the Flash created. As this limited the use of his speed, Thawne recruits Silver Banshee, Blockbuster, and Killer Frost to help him acquire a "Get Out of Hell Free" card so he can cheat death, only to encounter the Suicide Squad who defeat him and send him to die in the "Flashpoint" timeline.
- Eobard Thawne / Reverse-Flash appears in Lego DC Comics Super Heroes: The Flash, voiced by Dwight Schultz.
- Eobard Thawne / Reverse-Flash makes a cameo appearance in Injustice.

=== Video games ===
- Eobard Thawne / Professor Zoom appears in DC Universe Online.
- Eobard Thawne / Reverse-Flash, based on Tom Cavanagh's portrayal, appears as a playable character in the mobile version of Injustice: Gods Among Us.
- Eobard Thawne / Professor Zoom appears as a character summon in Scribblenauts Unmasked: A DC Comics Adventure.
- Eobard Thawne / Reverse-Flash appears as an unlockable playable character in Lego Batman 3: Beyond Gotham, voiced by Liam O'Brien.
- Eobard Thawne / Reverse-Flash appears as a "premier skin" for the Flash in Injustice 2, voiced again by Liam O'Brien. This version was stranded in the 21st century after being trapped in a paradox due to the Regime killing one of his ancestors, leading to him joining Gorilla Grodd's Society to seek revenge on the Flash, who previously supported the Regime.
- Eobard Thawne / Reverse-Flash appears in Lego DC Super-Villains, voiced again by C. Thomas Howell. This version is a member of the Legion of Doom.

=== Miscellaneous ===
- Eobard Thawne / Reverse-Flash appears in Justice League Adventures #6.
- Eobard Thawne / Reverse-Flash appears in the Death Battle! episode "Goku Black VS Reverse-Flash".

== Reception ==
IGN ranked Eobard Thawne as the 31st Greatest Comic Book Villain Of All Time in 2009 and #2 on their Top 5 Flash Villains list in 2015.
