= Valerie Perez =

Fictional character in DC Comics

- Valerie Perez, in The Flash: The Fastest Man Alive #12 (July 2007), art by Tony Daniel.

Publication information
- Publisher: DC Comics
- First appearance: The Flash: The Fastest Man Alive #1 (August 2006)
- Created by: Tony Daniel; Art Thibert

In-story information
- Alter ego: Valerie Perez
- Team affiliations: S.T.A.R. Labs
- Supporting character of: Bart Allen

Valerie Perez is a fictional character, a DC Comics supporting character and love interest for Bart Allen when Bart was the Flash.

== Fictional character biography ==
Valerie Perez is the daughter of Manfred Mota, an enemy of the Flash. Valerie's life was saved from a riot at her high school by Bart Allen when he was Kid Flash. After being rescued, Valerie idolized Bart and devoted her life to studying the Speed Force. After graduating from high school, Valerie works as an intern at S.T.A.R. Labs in Keystone City. Managing to earn Bart's trust, the two kiss during a lab test.

Valerie is fired from S.T.A.R. Labs after her relationship to Mota is discovered. Later, Mota visits Valerie at her home, having been transformed into an energy being. Mota captures Valerie and takes her to an unknown location, hoping to use her DNA to restore his appearance, and use Valerie as bait to take revenge on Bart, with Inertia's aid.

Inertia leads Bart to Valerie, revealing that she has been wired to a bomb. Faced with the choice of saving Valerie or all of Las Vegas, Bart deactivates the bomb and leads the bolt from the cannon around the world to destroy itself. After aiding Las Vegas in recouping from the power loss of the cannon firing, Bart returns to the penthouse to find Valerie safe.

Valerie plans to rejoin S.T.A.R. Labs, with the help of Bart's newfound fame as the Flash. Despite this, Valerie loses her job anyway, being seen more as a liability than as an asset, implying in a conversation with Bart that her fall of grace greatly depended by her having a relationship with Bart - an active, accident-prone metahuman.

While Valerie attempts to patch things up, opening up to Bart about her feelings and concerns, Bart tells her about Sue Dibny's death, believing that Valerie would be hurt or killed. Deeply hurt, Valerie breaks up with Bart.

Having a change of heart about Bart's concerns about her, Valerie follows Bart to the Police Academy, hoping to restart their relationship. Bart, having been forewarned by his grandmother Iris West about a battle awaiting him in the near future, spurns Valerie, hoping to spare her the pain of his probable death.

Despite this, Iris Allen shows up to call Bart's bluff to her, asking for Valerie's help in foiling Inertia's plan to strip the Speed Force out of Bart and leave him to die at the hands of the Rogues. Valerie complies, but is unable to stop the Rogues from killing Bart.
