= Hunter Zolomon =

Comic book supervillain in DC Comics

- Cover art to The Flash (vol. 2) #197 (June 2003) by Scott Kolins

Publication information
- Publisher: DC Comics
- First appearance: As Hunter Zolomon: The Flash: Secret Files & Origins #3 (November 2001); As Zoom: The Flash (vol. 2) #197 (June 2003)
- Created by: Geoff Johns; Scott Kolins

In-story information
- Full name: Hunter Zolomon
- Species: Metahuman
- Team affiliations: Keystone Police Department; F.B.I. Injustice League; Secret Society of Super Villains
- Notable aliases: Zoom, Reverse-Flash, Judge
- Abilities: Genius-level intellect, Expert in criminology and psychology Skilled investigator, tactician and hand-to-hand combatant Personal time manipulation in reference frame grants: Immense Superhuman speed; Superhuman strength, durability and reflexes; Sonic shockwave generation; Power distribution; Chronokinesis; Energy Projection

Hunter Zolomon, otherwise known as Zoom and the Reverse-Flash, is a supervillain appearing in American comic books published by DC Comics. Created by writer Geoff Johns and artist Scott Kolins, the character first appeared in The Flash: Secret Files & Origins #3 (November 2001). The second character to assume the Reverse-Flash mantle, he serves as the archnemesis of Wally West and an enemy of Barry Allen.

In 2009, Zoom was ranked as IGN's 37th-greatest comic book villain of all time.

Zoom appeared in the live-action Arrowverse television series The Flash, portrayed by Teddy Sears and voiced by Tony Todd.

== Publication history ==
Created by Geoff Johns and Scott Kolins, Hunter Zolomon made his debut in The Flash: Secret Files & Origins #3 in November 2001. He first appeared as Zoom in The Flash (vol. 2) #197 in June 2003.

== Fictional character biography ==
=== Origin and transformation into Zoom ===
Hunter Zolomon as he initially appeared before his transformation into Zoom. Art by Scott Kolins.

Hunter Zolomon is the son of a serial killer who is inspired to become a criminologist and psychologist after learning of his father's identity. He later joins the Federal Bureau of Investigation (FBI) with his wife Ashley, where he quickly makes a name for himself as a criminal profiler. His life changes after an encounter with the Clown. Zolomon assured Derek Fox, Ashley's father, that the crook would not be armed. Despite Ashley urging caution, Zolomon and Derek directly confront The Clown, and are caught off-guard when he pulls a gun. The Clown kills Derek and shoots Zolomon in the leg, permanently crippling him and forcing him to walk with a cane. Ashley divorces Zolomon, he is fired from the FBI, and he subsequently becomes a profiler in Keystone City. During his time working with Keystone City's Metahumans Unit, he became close friends with Wally West.

Zolomon is later injured in an attack by Gorilla Grodd and rendered paraplegic. He begs Wally to use the cosmic treadmill to change his history for the better, but he refuses, fearful of what will happen to the timestream. Zolomon breaks into the Flash Museum and attempts to use the treadmill himself. The resulting explosion cures Zolomon's paralysis and gives him superhuman speed. Zolomon becomes the supervillain Zoom and Ashley assumes his old job.

=== Rogue War ===
Zoom is freed from imprisonment by Cheetah (Barbara Minerva), seeking to recruit him into the Secret Society of Super Villains. Although the two share a minor attraction and romance, Zoom still considers himself married to Ashley.

Zoom infiltrates the Rogue war between Captain Cold's Rogues, the Trickster's reformed Rogues, and the Top's brainwashed Rogues. After spiriting Ashley out of danger to Linda's home, Zoom returns to the battlefront to dispatch Captain Cold whom he believes is wasting the Flash's time. As Wally and Kid Flash (Bart Allen) attempt to contain the battle, Zoom threatens to snap Bart's neck in a manner reminiscent of what Barry had done to Eobard Thawne. Before Zoom can kill Kid Flash, however, Thawne arrives on a cosmic treadmill with Jay Garrick chained to it.

A battle ensues between the three Flashes and the two Zooms. Zolomon and Thawne capture Wally and jump onto the treadmill. Zolomon forces Wally to repeatedly experience their first fight in which Linda was severely injured, feeling that West should be made to focus on feelings of sorrow and loss to become a better hero. However, Barry arrives on his own cosmic treadmill in search of Thawne. Barry subsequently saves Wally and returns Thawne to the predecessor's proper place in the timeline. The enraged Zoom then begins running around the world, building up speed to collide with and kill Linda. Wally catches up with Zoom and pushes him, causing the villain to fall forward into the sonic boom that he himself used to kill Linda's twins, thus creating a "fissure in time" that restores Linda's pregnancy. Wally grabs Zoom and uses the treadmill to return to the present. Zoom recognizes his mistreatment of Wally and briefly apologizes before slipping into the timestream. He is later seen as a ghostly figure apologizing to Ashley.

Zoom returns during the 2005–2006 "Infinite Crisis" storyline as the Secret Society of Super Villains' chief speedster. He serves as a member of the Society's strike force, scarring Damage with super-speed punches and massacring the Freedom Fighters.

=== "One Year Later" ===
During the 2007 story, "One Year Later", Zoom appears at the sacking of Rome. It is unknown whether he travelled to this time period himself, or if he became stranded there after his last encounter with Wally. Zoom is asked by Bart's grandmother to help protect Bart from a tragedy plotted by the villain Inertia. He is also pursued by the Justice League who seek to locate Sinestro after Batman and Green Lantern learn of the Sinestro Corps' existence. Zoom is chased by the Justice Society of America to Atlanta. Damage, seeking revenge on Zoom, takes the villain hostage during a scuffle until being talked down by Liberty Belle. Disappointed that Damage is not "improving", Zoom throws a sharp pipe to kill Damage. Liberty Belle uses super-speed to catch it and toss it back, knocking Zoom unconscious. Zoom later becomes a member of Libra's Secret Society of Super Villains.

=== Final Crisis ===
In the 2008 story Final Crisis: Rogues' Revenge, Zoom frees Inertia from the paralysis inflicted by Wally, hoping to make an apprentice out of Inertia by teaching how to "improve" both his own life and the lives of others by inflicting tragedies. Kid Zoom learns this lesson too well and ultimately betrays the Flash's Rogues and Zoom himself, revealing his own desire to make the heroes suffer whereas Zoom wanted them to work through their pain. Inertia then uses his mentor's time-manipulating powers against him, unraveling Zoom's timeline and reverting him to the crippled, powerless Zolomon.

=== The Flash: Rebirth ===
Zolomon makes a cameo in the 2009 - 2010 miniseries The Flash: Rebirth when he approaches the resurrected and imprisoned Thawne at Iron Heights Penitentiary, stating that they can help each other to be better.

=== DC Rebirth ===
In DC's 2011 relaunch of its monthly titles DC Rebirth relaunch, when Iris West seemingly kills Eobard in the 25th century, a cloaked figure called the Judge sends the Renegades back in time to arrest Iris. The hooded man is revealed to be Zolomon proclaiming that the only way to make the Flashes better heroes is to pit them in a war where they will experience tragedy. Zolomon muses that he sees Wally as the 'true' Flash, reflecting that Barry's ability to accept death is the crucial difference between Barry and Wally as the Flash (feeling that Wally goes into situations determined to survive) and musing that this difference is how he will provoke his planned war.

It is revealed that Thawne brought Zolomon into the 25th century as part of Zolomon's prior suggestion in Flash: Rebirth that they could help each other be better, the two manipulating the Renegades and agreeing on the need for the Flashes to take a different approach, but they soon parted ways because Thawne felt that, in the end, Zolomon still had faith that the Flashes could be what he imagined them to be whereas Thawne had given up on that idea. After Thawne's 'death', Zolomon finally concedes to Thawne's ideas, returning to his appearance as Zoom and proclaiming that he will provoke the Flashes to war if they will not cooperate with his vision themselves. He subsequently draws Wally to him, claiming that he has lost his powers and regained his sanity, and provokes Wally's memories of lost children, convincing Wally that the Speed Force must be sacrificed to release the other speedsters—including Impulse (Bart Allen) and Max Mercury—who are trapped within it, provoking Barry and Wally to war against each other due to their conflicting views on Zolomon's advice. The situation escalates when Barry and Wally's conflict breaks the Speed Force, allowing Zolomon to draw on the energies of the Strength Force and the Sage Force as The Flash. When he tries to use these powers to set history to his own design, he is pursued by the Flashes and lost when he breaks the Speed Force, leaving his location unknown and rendering the Flashes unable to travel through time.

=== Death to the Speed Force ===
Now the only Speedster capable of multiversal travel, Zolomon kills Flashes across dimensions and terrorizes Gorilla City. After assimilating the Still Force, Zolomon reveals to Barry that the combined forces create the Forever Force, which gives him omniscience. However, Barry convinces Zolomon to sacrifice himself to repair the Speed Force and defeat the Black Flash.

In a 2023 storyline, it is revealed that Zolomon survived, but was imprisoned in the Speed Force. There, he was forced to relive his past before escaping, resuming his mission to torment Wally.

== Powers and abilities ==
While most speedsters in the DC Universe draw their powers from the Speed Force, Hunter Zolomon can alter time relative to himself, manipulating the speed at which time flows around him which is later revealed to be the Forever Force. With every step he takes, he uses time travel to control his personal timeline; he slows it down to move faster and speeds it up to move slower, effectively allowing Zolomon to run at "superhuman speeds". He can also create powerful sonic booms and electrical shockwaves by snapping his fingers, and is able to grant a form of "super-speed" to other beings by giving them the ability to control their relative timelines through himself; a connection that Zoom can shut down at will. Due to his slowed perception of time, Zolomon's strength and physical attributes have been heightened to superhuman levels, allowing him to effortlessly react to danger and be able to withstand punches from speedsters while sustaining no serious injuries. The temporal nature of Zoom's powers renders him unaffected by the usual problems and hindrances encountered by other speedsters, such as friction and perception when moving at heightened velocities.

Zolomon possesses a keen mind, as he was once an investigator specialising in the study of criminology and psychology. Zolomon is also an expert in many forms of hand-to-hand combat, including the martial arts form Taekwondo, and an avid cross country runner and jogger even prior to gaining metahuman powers.

== In other media ==
=== Television ===
Zoom in a promotional image of The Flash (left) and Teddy Sears as the Earth-2 Hunter Zolomon unmasked (right)
- Hunter Zolomon / Zoom / Black Flash appears in TV series set in the Arrowverse:
  - Zolomon is introduced and featured most prominently in the second season of The Flash, portrayed by Teddy Sears as an adult and by Octavian Kaul as a child in flashbacks while Zoom's disguised appearance is voiced by Tony Todd and initially portrayed by Ryan Handley. This version is a speedster from Earth-2 who produces blue lightning while running and wears a black leather bodysuit with clawed gloves and a demonic mask resembling a face restraint. After being forced to watch his father kill his mother, he became a serial killer until he was sent to a mental asylum and underwent electroconvulsive therapy while Harry Wells's particle accelerator exploded, with the dark matter released granting Zolomon super-speed. He used his powers as Zoom to subjugate Earth-2 and created various "Velocity" serums to further augment his Speed Force connection which left him slowly dying, while publicly masquerading as "Jay Garrick", the Flash of Earth-2, to give its inhabitants a false sense of hope. After ending up on Earth-1, Zolomon tricks Barry Allen / Flash into strengthening his own Speed Force connection in order to steal it and develops a romance with Caitlin Snow before eventually attempting to destroy the multiverse except for Earth-1, only to be thwarted by Allen and dragged out of reality by Time Wraiths. Afterwards, Zolomon makes sporadic appearances as the Black Flash in the third season as well as with past versions of himself involving time travel in the fifth and ninth seasons. He makes a final appearance in the ninth season, summoned by Eddie Thawne, alongside Eobard Thawne, Savitar, and Goodspeed to help kill the Flash and his friends and allies, but the group is thwarted by Team Flash.
  - Zolomon as the Black Flash appears in the second season of Legends of Tomorrow.

=== Film ===
Hunter Zolomon / Zoom was planned to appear in David S. Goyer's cancelled film Flash.

=== Video games ===
- Zoom appears as a boss in Justice League Heroes: The Flash.
- Zoom appears in DC Universe Online, voiced by Robert Dieke.
- Zoom appears as a character summon in Scribblenauts Unmasked: A DC Comics Adventure.
- The Arrowverse incarnation of Zoom appears in Lego DC Super-Villains via the "DC TV Super-Villains" DLC pack.

=== Merchandise ===
- Funko released two POP! vinyl figures of Hunter Zolomon in The Flash television series tie-in toyline. The first is a regular version as Zoom and the second is a "Legion of Collectors" exclusive of his impersonation of Jay Garrick.
- DC Collectibles released a 7-inch Zoom figure based on his Arrowverse appearance.
