= Godspeed (character) =

Fictional character, a supervillain in the DC Universe

- Godspeed as seen on the textless cover of The Flash (vol. 5) #6 (November 2016). Art by Carmine Di Giandomenico.

Publication information
- Publisher: DC Comics
- First appearance: Cameo appearance: The Flash: Rebirth #1 (August 2016); Full appearance: The Flash (vol. 5) #3 (September 2016)
- Created by: Joshua Williamson; Carmine Di Giandomenico

In-story information
- Alter ego: August Heart
- Species: Metahuman
- Place of origin: Central City
- Team affiliations: Central City Police Department; Rogues
- Abilities: Superhuman speed, agility, reflexes, strength, durability, stamina.; Self-duplication; Electrokinesis; Vortex creation; Speed Force conduit, aura, theft; Accelerated healing; Enhanced senses; Intangibility and phasing; Speed scout; Energy construct creation; Time-space manipulation

Godspeed (August Heart) is a fictional character appearing in American comic books published by DC Comics. Created by writer Joshua Williamson and artist Carmine Di Giandomenico, Heart was established as a detective and one of Barry Allen's best friends on the police force. When his brother is murdered and the man he suspects is exonerated, he becomes vengeful and eventually gains speed-based superpowers. Donning the identity of Godspeed, he becomes a vigilante bent on killing criminals instead of incarcerating them, serving as an antithesis to the Flash. He has been portrayed as both a supervillain and an antihero in the comic books and adapted media since his introduction in 2016.

The character made his live-action debut in The Flash, voiced by BD Wong in seasons five and six and portrayed by the Canadian actor Karan Oberoi in seasons seven and nine.

== Fictional character biography ==
August Heart is a colleague of Barry Allen from the Central City Police Department. Heart's brother was murdered by a career criminal and his killer was let free due to the evidence being destroyed when Barry's lab was struck by lightning. When August confronts Black Hole, a group who had stolen a van containing equipment from S.T.A.R. Labs, he recognizes their symbol as the same one spray-painted near his brother's crime scene. August is shot at but before the bullet could hit him or Barry could save him, August is struck by lightning from a Speed Force storm. Now a speedster, August knocks out his shooter. After Barry reveals himself to be the Flash, August creates his own costume and becomes Barry's partner, intending to solve his brother's murder. After defeating Black Hole, the two witness another Speed Force storm strike more citizens, turning them into speedsters. August helps Barry round up any new speedsters who use their newfound powers as criminals. The two meet Meena Dhawan, a new speedster who has helped create a Speed Force training center to help the new speedsters control their powers. When Barry and Meena return after recruiting more speedsters, they find the injured August, who tells them that a new speedster called Godspeed killed the speedster criminals and took their speed. A recovered August brings two of the recruits with him in order to storm the Speed Force-infused Joseph Carver. After Barry and Meena's 'day off', Godspeed arrives at the training center, where he is confronted by Meena. As Avery Ho, one of the speedster recruits, escapes to get the Flash, Godspeed kills Meena and two of the recruits and takes their speed.

When Godspeed kills Billy Parks, the main suspect in August's brother's murder, Barry realizes that August is Godspeed. Barry confronts him and August reveals that he is indeed Godspeed and had given up on the justice system, deciding to become judge, jury and executioner, killing his brother's murderer. August reveals that when he was near the speedster criminals, he could feel the Speed Force within them connecting with him. He decided to take their powers from them, resulting in their deaths and August being injured. After realizing that it was possible to siphon another speedster's speed without killing them, August tried it again on Meena and the two recruits. However, it had the same results as the first time. With his increased speed, August reveals he can create a double of himself and be at two places at once, though it takes a physical toll on him. Barry uses this to his advantage and escapes. August proceeds to interrogate the other Black Hole members about his brother's death, but kills them all when he receives no information. When the speedster recruits safely give their speed to Barry and Wally to stop Godspeed, August arrives and is able to take Avery's speed. Barry chases after Godspeed who reveals that he will head to Iron Heights and do the one thing Barry could not, kill his enemies, including Eobard Thawne. Ace West intervenes and helps the Flash in taking down Godspeed, who is later incarcerated in Iron Heights. It is not known whether August still maintains a connection to the Speed Force, as it was hinted that all who were hit during the Speed Force storm will eventually lose their powers.

August later teams up with the Flash and the Reverse-Flash to stop the villain Paradox from erasing all of the Flash's history. After Paradox is defeated, August asks Thawne if, given the latter's extensive future knowledge of the Flash, he knows who killed August's brother. Thawne gleefully admits being his brother's killer and snaps August's neck, killing him. When Reverse-Flash is defeated, Godspeed's death is undone.

Godspeed later appears in the storyline "One Minute War", where he takes down a group of villains (The Fraction) and saves civilians. He appears in Simon Spurrier's Flash series, where he is captured by Wally and Ace.

== Powers and abilities ==
In addition to abilities shared with other speedsters, Godspeed has the ability to forcibly take another speedster's speed. This is done by running around a speedster (or speedsters) at extreme speed, resulting in Godspeed gaining their speed, but at the cost of injuring himself and killing any victim or victims not willing to give up their speed. However, Godspeed was able to take Avery's speed without killing her, and Barry and Wally were able to take the speed from several speedsters safely.

Godspeed also has the ability to create a clone of himself by dividing the Speed Force in him. However, extended use of this clone will result in intense pain, and the copy will then destabilize, with its portion of the Speed Force returning to the original Godspeed. Like other speedsters, Godspeed can run up to 10 times the speed of light by entering the Speed Force.

== In other media ==
August Heart / Godspeed appears in The Flash, portrayed by Kindall Charters in the fifth season, Ryan Handley in the sixth season, and Karan Oberoi in the seventh and ninth seasons, and voiced by BD Wong in the fifth and sixth seasons and Rick D. Wasserman in the seventh season. This version is a scientist from the year 2049 whose abilities are derived from tachyon technology that replicates the Velocity drug's effects.
