= Jesse Chambers =

DC Comics superhero

- Interior artwork from Justice League of America vol. 2, 57 (May 2011 DC Comics); Art by Brett Booth

Publication information
- Publisher: DC Comics
- First appearance: Justice Society of America (vol. 2) #1 (August 1992)
- Created by: Len Strazewski, Mike Parobeck

In-story information
- Full name: Jesse Belle Chambers
- Species: Metahuman
- Team affiliations: Teen Titans; Justice Society of America; Justice League
- Notable aliases: The Flash, Liberty Belle, Jesse Quick
- Abilities: Superhuman speed, agility, and reflexes; Speed force connection; Superhuman strength, stamina, and durability; Accelerated healing; Enhanced senses; Flight by using her super speed; Genius-level intellect; Advanced hand-to-hand combatant and martial artist

Jesse Belle Chambers is a superhero appearing in American comic books published by DC Comics. Chambers, who mainly uses the superhero name Jesse Quick and briefly Liberty Belle, is the daughter of Golden Age heroes Johnny Quick and Liberty Belle. She inherited both of her parents' powers of superhuman speed and super-strength, and, unlike other speedsters, is also capable of flight. She was initially a scholar of superheroes who was recruited into the Justice Society of America after aiding them. She is a longtime ally of the Flash, despite their often difficult relationship, and has been a core member of the Justice Society of America, Titans and Justice League.

A version of Jesse Chambers renamed Jesse Wells appeared as a recurring character on The CW television series The Flash, portrayed by Violett Beane.

== Publication history ==
The 1992 limited series Armageddon: Inferno re-introduced the Justice Society of America after their disappearance into and re-emergence from the limbo dimension of Ragnarok (where they had been trapped since 1986's The Last Days of the Justice Society). Subsequently, a new Justice Society of America series (vol. 2) debuted. The series' first issue introduced the character of Jesse Chambers. Thereafter, Jesse became a supporting character in The Flash (vol. 2) as Wally West's partner, Jesse Quick. She also spends a brief run on Booster Gold's team The Conglomerate, when he leaves the JLA.

In 1999, Jesse was featured in a lead role in writer Devin Grayson's series Titans, which ran until 2002. After 50 issues, Titans was cancelled and ultimately relaunched in writer Judd Winick's Titans/Young Justice: Graduation Day limited series. Jesse was not part of the new roster of Titans introduced after Graduation Day.

Following Graduation Day, Jesse played a small supporting role in Geoff Johns and David Goyer's JSA series, where she served as Rick Tyler's love interest. When the book relaunched in 2006 as Justice Society of America (vol. 3), Jesse was featured as one of the main characters, now going by the name of Liberty Belle. She served primarily under the Liberty Belle name until Johns' 2009 limited series, Flash: Rebirth, where she returned to the Jesse Quick identity. She continued to feature as one of the leads in Justice Society until late 2010, when she was brought over to the writer James Robinson's revamp of the Justice League of America (vol. 2) series.

In addition, the character was the star of the Liberty Belle & Hourman back-up feature in JSA All-Stars from issue #2 of the series. Written by Jen Van Meter and drawn by Travis Moore, the series was an action/romance feature which chronicled the adventures of Jesse and her husband Rick as they battled the villainous couple of Tigress and Icicle. The series had its finale in JSA All-Stars #10 in October 2010.

== Fictional character biography ==
=== Origin and early career ===
In hopes of creating a successor, Johnny Quick taught the formula that gave him his enhanced speed to his daughter, Jesse. The formula worked on Jesse as well and she gained super-speed. However, rather than becoming a superhero as her father had intended, Jesse instead opted to continue her education as her mother requested.

While Jesse was studying at Gotham University, the superhero team her parents had been colleagues with, the Justice Society of America, reemerged following a long absence. Her thesis topic became "The Impact of Superheroes on Society" and she began to follow the returned heroes, cataloging their adventures. When her father asked her to deliver some documents to the Society, the encounter would result in her aiding the team as Jesse Quick, finally living up to her father's dream of her being a costumed crime fighter.

It was during that time that she met Wally West, the Flash, who would later ask her to be his replacement if something were to happen to him. It was all an elaborate plan on his part, trying to force Bart Allen, Impulse, to take his role in the legacy of the Flash more seriously and be Wally's successor. Although she felt betrayed, she would end up saving Wally's life, though her leg was hurt in the process. When Wally returned from the mythical Speed Force, he healed her leg, and the earlier deception was largely forgiven but not forgotten.

When, shortly after, Jesse lost her enhanced speed, the person she blamed was Wally who had been directly using the Speed Force energies instead of simply tapping them like the other speedsters did. In fact, it turned out to be the villain Savitar who was the cause, having severed her connection to the Speed Force, as well as multiple other speedsters. Nonetheless, Wally chose the depowered Jesse to accompany him to Savitar's lair where she succeeded in regaining her powers. During the following battle with Savitar, her father gave his life to protect his daughter from one of Savitar's forces and merged with the Speed Force. Although Wally would ultimately triumph over the villain, Jesse was left to mourn her father.

=== Titans ===
Jesse accepted the reins of managing her father's corporation, Quickstart Enterprises, while also operating as Jesse Quick, even joining the members of the Titans to stop a nuclear threat. When the Titans were later going through a reorganization, Wally, a founding member, selected Jesse to join the roster, hoping to soothe their old wounds. After initially declining the offer, she ultimately joined the Titans, but was only on the team for a short time, feeling herself to be second-best to Wally.

Nightwing, another founding member, persuaded Jesse to return to the Titans. Later, Jesse became involved in a murder mystery involving her own widowed mother, Libby Lawrence. The victim was Philip Geyer, Libby's fiancé. An investigation by the Titans revealed not only the killer but also an ongoing affair between Philip and Jesse which had contributed to his death. Although Jesse attempted to reconcile with her mother, the saddened Libby found it hard to forgive her daughter although she apparently did, as in later appearances the two had returned to their friendly relationship. The Titans were disbanded not long afterwards, as members Lilith Clay and Donna Troy were killed in an attack by a rogue Superman robot in the limited series Titans/Young Justice: Graduation Day.

=== Powerless ===
Jesse saving Wally West during the battle with Zoom.

Following that disbanding of the team, Jesse threw herself back into her responsibilities at Quickstart Enterprises, finding little time for a social life. When Wally would later need assistance to defeat the villain Zoom who was capable of moving at speeds surpassing any of Earth's other speedsters, Jesse lent Wally a portion of her special abilities, temporarily boosting Wally's speed so that he was moving almost faster than light and allowing him to defeat Zoom, but leaving her powerless and unable to remember the formula to access her powers. Although Wally knew the formula, she told him not to remind her, reminding him that he had earlier told her that she needed to slow down anyway.

After that, she worked as business manager for a newly reformed Justice Society of America. The JSA successfully rescued her mother, who had returned to her role as Liberty Belle, but whose powers had gone out of control. In that same adventure, mother and daughter reconciled.

=== One Year Later ===
Jesse had become a member of the Justice Society, carrying on her mother's legacy as the new Liberty Belle. She is now married to fellow second-generation hero Rick Tyler, also known as Hourman.

In an encounter with Zoom, it is revealed that Jesse has retained her speed powers by repeating her father's formula. This adds to her super-strength, which means she inherited both of her parents' powers. In the same encounter, she talks the hero Damage out of murdering Zoom.

In The Flash: Rebirth miniseries, an explosion suddenly occurs in front of the pair. Jesse is shocked to see her father Johnny Quick is alive in the Speed Force, as he materializes and begs Barry Allen not to hurt Jesse before vanishing (but he dies later by Professor Zoom's actions). Hourman is tending to Jesse, who (since seeing her father) has begun repeating her father's speed formula over and over. Jesse, now crackling with Speed Force energy, stops repeating the Speed Formula. She reveals that she has finally solved the equation: "Jesse Quick. Max Mercury. Jay Garrick. Wally West. Bart Allen. Barry Allen. The Speed Force".

When Wally West's twins Jai and Iris are struck with crippling pain thanks to Professor Zoom, Iris takes Jai's connection to the Speed Force and nearly kills herself doing so. Jesse arrives and recites the now-revealed Speed Mantra to revive Iris, telling Jai and Linda West that Iris is the next generation of speedsters. The two join the battle between the revealed Professor Zoom and the combined forces of the three Flashes (Jay, Wally, and Barry), Max Mercury, and Kid Flash. With the speedsters reunited, Wally uses a trick with the Speed Force, revitalizing the speedsters and transforming his, Jesse's, and Iris's outfits. Jesse dons a uniform patterned after her father's.

She returns to her Liberty Belle outfit for a few adventures leading up to the Blackest Night storyline, but switches to her Jesse Quick identity and costume when she is attacked by the reanimated corpse of her father. Liberty Belle is found by her father, Johnny Quick, who claims that Jesse's love for him was the reason he came back. Jesse says that she has a uniform like his and quickly changes into it by reciting the mathematical formula that her father originally used and calls herself Jesse Quick. The two speedsters then run off. While she is running across the globe with her father trying to enjoy the time she's spending with him, she thinks she should rather be with her husband, the modern-day Hourman. Jesse continues to run with her father, remembering her childhood memories of when they used to jog together around their neighbourhood and Johnny would let her win, feeling thankful that she was able to spend only a few moments with him again. Later, Black Lantern Johnny Quick is destroyed by Mr. Terrific's machine that turned off the Black Lanterns' connection to their rings.

When the JSA splits into two teams, Jesse remains with the JSA, while her husband Rick went to the JSA All-Stars. However, Rick and Jesse remain happily married, although her teammates and the public at large believe otherwise, forcing Rick to explain their condition as "a working couple working in different offices".

At Wonder-Con, writer James Robinson announced that Jesse would be joining the Justice League of America as part of DC's Brightest Day event. This development occurred at the conclusion of the JLA/JSA crossover, The Dark Things, with Batman asking Jesse to join the JLA to fill her old friend Wally West's role as the team speedster.

During her tenure with the JLA, Jesse gradually begins to lose her speed abilities, and it is eventually revealed that this is due to her being pregnant. The League disbands shortly after this, and Jesse leaves to be with Rick. Jesse later gives birth during the Convergence mini-series.

=== The New 52 ===
After the Flashpoint when Barry resets the timeline, Jesse is among those erased by Doctor Manhattan's machinations when "The New 52" rebooted the DC universe. However, it is later revealed she is trapped in the Speed Force, in an area called the Starting Line with Max Mercury.

=== DC Rebirth ===
In 2016, DC Comics implemented a relaunch of its books called "DC Rebirth" which restored its continuity to a form much as it was prior to "The New 52". In "Doomsday Clock", Jesse in her Liberty Belle outfit is seen with the Justice Society when Doctor Manhattan undoes the experiment that erased the Justice Society of America and the Legion of Super-Heroes. This was later revealed as a failed attempt by Manhattan to repair the timeline.

After his body is possessed by Eobard Thawne, Barry finally meets Jesse and Max. Initially his guilt warps his perception, seeing them as nightmarish monsters. Once he regains control of his body, Barry frees Jesse and Max from the Speed Force to finally be reunited with the Flash family. Jesse helps defeat the Legion of Zoom thereafter.

Jesse later unites with the Flash Family to search for a missing Barry Allen, jumping into a portal that transports herself and Max to a post-apocalyptic wasteland. There they meet an alternate Barry, the fastest driver in his universe.

== Powers and abilities ==
Just like her father, Jesse has powers of flight and accelerated speed, resulting from the state of mind achieved from the visualization of the speed-formula: 3X2(9YZ)4A. Her powers are linked to the Speed Force. She also has her mother's super-strength, enabling her to lift great weights, such as a car, with ease. As with her mother, the mechanism of her super-strength remains unexplained, which irritated her father. She attributes her powers to a "mantra" like the formula used by her father to unlock his speed. She also has superhuman stamina, superhuman reaction/reflexes and superhuman agility. She heals much faster than a normal human, thus, having super healing.

== Other versions ==
- A teenage version of Jesse Chambers appears in the anime-inspired Ame-Comi universe as its version of the Flash.
- On Earth-11, an adult Jesse Quick became the Flash, a member of the Justice Guild, and the aunt/mentor of Jess Chambers / Kid Quick.

== In other media ==
Jesse Quick as she appears in The Flash.

- Characters based on Jesse Chambers appear in The Flash.
  - Jesse Chambers Wells / Jesse Quick appears in the second, third, fourth seasons, portrayed by Violett Beane. This version is a native of Earth-2 and daughter of Harry Wells who Zoom kidnapped to force him to steal Barry Allen's speed. After Barry and his allies rescue Jesse, who enters a relationship with Wally West, she is exposed to dark matter energy and temporarily falls into a coma amidst "Team Flash's" efforts to restore Barry’s speed. Barry later uses the Speed Force to revive her and defeats Zoom before she and Harry return to Earth-2, where Jesse becomes a speedster amidst her father's hesitation over her being a superhero. Eventually, he accepts her decision, gives her a super suit, and allows her to return to Earth-1 to study under Barry. Additionally, she protects Earth-3 for Jay Garrick while he is trapped in the Speed Force. As of the fourth season, Jesse returned to Earth-2, where she recruited a team to help her combat the last of Zoom's forces, and breaks up with West to focus on her work.
  - Jess Chambers appears in the series finale "A New World" Pt. 4, portrayed by Hana Destiny Huggins. She is chosen by Barry to become a speedster.
- Jesse Quick makes a cameo appearance in the Flash's ending in Injustice 2.
- Jesse Quick appears in Teen Titans Go! #52 as an alternate alias of Robby Reed after his H-Dial borrows Kid Flash's powers.
