= Daniel West (character) =

Character appearing in DC Comics

- Daniel West / Reverse-Flash as depicted in The Flash #23 (November 2013). Art by Francis Manapul and Brian Buccellato.

Publication information
- Publisher: DC Comics
- First appearance: The Flash #0 (November 2012)
- Created by: Francis Manapul; Brian Buccellato

In-story information
- Alter ego: Daniel West
- Species: Metahuman
- Place of origin: Keystone City
- Team affiliations: Suicide Squad
- Partnerships: Ace West (son)
- Notable aliases: Reverse-Flash
- Abilities: Superhuman speed, agility, stamina, and reflexes; Time travel; Can sense and absorb the Speed Force from its users

Daniel "Danny" West is a fictional character appearing in American comic books published by DC Comics. The character was created by writers-artists Francis Manapul and Brian Buccellato, and first appeared in The Flash #0 (November 2012). He is the most recent character to take up the Reverse-Flash mantle. Furthermore, he is the younger brother of Iris West and father of Ace West.

== Publication history ==
Daniel West first appeared as a teenager in The Flash #0 (November 2012). The story was set five years before the present and he was only identified on-panel as Danny.

Francis Manapul and Brian Buccellato first revealed that Reverse-Flash would appear in The Flash in November 2012. According to them, the inclusion of Reverse-Flash in the series was not due to them wanting to include the character, but because they felt it was the "natural place to go". Manapul stated that originally, they planned on not using the character until later in the series, but decided to include him due to where the story and characters were heading.

== Fictional character biography ==
Daniel West is the younger brother of Iris West, whose mother died while giving birth to him. Their mother's death drives their father William to become an alcoholic and abusive towards his children, blaming Daniel for his mother's death. At the age of 12, Daniel pushes William down the stairs in response to his actions, crippling him.

Five years later, by the time he is 18, Daniel has become a small-time thug and joined a stickup crew. His first big job involves his crew stealing money from a bank, with him acting as the lookout and driver. Before the robbery, Daniel seeks Iris out in an attempt to reconnect, telling her he intends to use the money to secure both of them financially. Iris rejects his offer and tells him to make amends with their father. While the robbery is successful, the gang's escape plan is foiled by the Flash (Barry Allen), and Daniel is sentenced to five years in prison.

Daniel is paroled and released from prison around the same time Gorilla Grodd invades Central City. During the invasion, Daniel attempts to contact Iris and ensure her safety. He visits Iris' apartment, only to discover that she has been missing for three months. While running away from the gorillas and attempting to save some civilians, Daniel is captured. Daniel is saved by the Rogues, who take him and several other captured civilians to the Mirror Master's Mirror World. Daniel attempts to escape from the Rogues, but crashes into a car powered by a Speed Force battery. Daniel is riddled with shrapnel from the crash and infused with Speed Force energy, which morphs the shrapnel into armor that fuses with his body.

Daniel dubs himself the Reverse-Flash and begins killing those with Speed Force abilities to drain their speed so he can travel back in time and kill his father. Daniel's plan to kill his father is backfired when he sees his younger self and Iris come home. Daniel attempts to kill his father while the Flash defends the young Daniel and Iris. The Flash convinces Daniel to not kill his father and so he gives up his Speed Force energy to the Flash to fix his mistake. The two return to the present and Daniel is sent back to Iron Heights Penitentiary.

Daniel is recruited into the Suicide Squad while also discovering that his powers have returned. The Squad have discovered a time bomb in a Turkish village which they refuse to remove. Daniel throws the time bomb into the ocean, where it detonates. While running back to the group, Daniel trips over on the water and is killed after being sucked into a vortex.

== In other media ==
Elements of Daniel West are incorporated into an alternate version of Wally West who appears in The Flash, portrayed by Keiynan Lonsdale.
