= List of DC Comics characters: Q =

== Moira Queen ==
Moira Queen is the mother of Oliver Queen/Green Arrow. She and her husband Robert were killed by lions during a safari in Africa.

=== Moira Queen in other media ===
Moira Queen appears in Arrow, portrayed by Susanna Thompson. This version was killed by Deathstroke before being resurrected following the changes to history during "Crisis on Infinite Earths".

== Robert Queen ==
Robert Henry Queen is the father of Oliver Queen/Green Arrow. He was created by Chuck Dixon and Rick Burchett, first appearing in Green Arrow (vol. 2) Annual #7 (1995). He and his wife Moira were killed by lions during a safari in Africa.

=== Robert Queen in other media ===
- Robert Queen appears in the Smallville episode "Traveler", portrayed by Jonathan Scarfe. This version was killed by Lionel Luthor.
- Robert Queen appears in Arrow, portrayed by Jamey Sheridan. This version was killed in the shipwreck that stranded Oliver Queen on Lian Yu.
- Henry Queen makes a non-speaking appearance in a flashback in Batman: The Doom That Came to Gotham. This version helped found Gotham City centuries prior, gaining wealth and longevity through dark magic.

== Johnny Quick ==
Johnny Quick is the name of two characters appearing in DC Comics.

=== Johnny Chambers ===
Johnny Quick is a Golden Age DC Comics character with the power of superhuman speed. The character first appeared in More Fun Comics #71 (September 1941). After his More Fun run ended in issue #107 (January–February 1946), he was moved to Adventure Comics with issue #103 (April 1946). He remained as a regular feature in Adventure until issue #207 (December 1954).

Johnny Chambers is a newsreel photographer for Sees-All/Tells-All News. He invokes his power by reciting a mathematical formula ("3X2(9YZ)4A") taught to him by his childhood guardian, Professor Gill, who had in turn derived it from inscriptions found in a Pharaoh's tomb.

During World War II, Johnny joins the All-Star Squadron. Johnny meets Liberty Belle, Plastic Man, Doctor Mid-Nite, Hawkman, Robotman, and Atom, and they are all tasked with preventing Japan from attacking the mainland United States following the attack on Pearl Harbor. During the war, Johnny meets other speedsters, the Flash and Quicksilver (Max Mercury). Quicksilver becomes a mentor for Johnny, though Johnny does not always take his advice easily. In the 1950s, Johnny retires.

Thanks to his abilities, Johnny's age is slowed, keeping him young and vigorous despite his true age. After the Justice Society of America returns following a long absence, Johnny assists them occasionally. Together with the Justice Society, Johnny faces the villain Extant during the event Zero Hour: Crisis in Time!. Like the other heroes present, Johnny is aged considerably by the villain. Despite his age, Johnny refuses to retire. His daughter Jesse Quick, who inherited his superhuman speed, becomes a superhero as well. Johnny also becomes a mentor to the time-displaced Bart Allen.

Some time afterwards, Johnny meets with Iris West, who warns him that trouble is forthcoming for users of the Speed Force. Johnny refuses to believe his power is not his own until he loses his powers to Savitar and is grudgingly forced to accept the Speed Force's existence. In the final battle with Savitar, Johnny sacrifices himself to save his daughter's life and runs into the Speed Force, merging with it.

== The Quiz ==
The Quiz is a character appearing in American comic books published by DC Comics.

Sachiko is a member of the Brotherhood of Dada gathered by Mr. Nobody, taking the name of the Quiz. She is able to manifest any power imaginable as long as it was not named by others. For example, she had exihibited powers such as flight, mimicking appearances, turning people to glass, turning back time, dematerialization, making things large, turning people into toilets filled with flowers, and manifesting escape-proof spirit jars. Due to her irrational fear of dirt, she wears a gown and gas mask decorated with question marks. Originally unnamed, the character was named Sachiko in post-Rebirth continuity after her counterpart from the Doom Patrol television series.

=== The Quiz in other media ===
The Quiz appears in the third season of Doom Patrol, portrayed by Gina Hiraizumi.

== Quiz Kid ==
Quiz Kid (Raghu Seetharaman) is a character appearing in American comic books published by DC Comics. He was introduced in the storyline "The New Golden Age" as one of several forgotten sidekicks of Golden Age superheroes.

Raghu Seetharaman is a child prodigy whose intelligence earned him the nickname Quiz Kid. While he was participating in a trivia competition, it was interrupted by the Spirit King, who took everyone there hostage. Mister Terrific defeated Spirit King and challenged Raghu to a friendly competition, which lasted for 12 hours before ending in a draw. Raghu went on to become Mister Terrific's sidekick. By 1946, Quiz Kid mysteriously vanished while Mister Terrific was investigating the similar disappearance of Betsy Ross and Molly Pitcher.

Quiz Kid is among the lost sidekicks who were captured by Childminder and held on Orphan Island. After Boom frees all the Lost Children, Quiz Kid and Robbie the robot dog work on reprogramming Hourman, who had been acting irrationally and intended to take the sidekicks from Childminder. Hourman brings Quiz Kid and the Lost Children to the lost day, stating that returning them to their own times would cause a time paradox.

== Qwsp ==
Qwsp is a character appearing in American comic books published by DC Comics. His name was originally spelled 'Quisp' in his first appearances, but was retconned to Qwsp when he reappeared in JLA #30.

Qwsp is an imp from the 5th Dimension, the same dimension as Mister Mxyzptlk, with whom he shares a liking for warping reality for his own amusement. Qwsp was for many years a valued ally of Aquaman, starting with helping Aquaman fight the Fire Trolls.

Inspired by Aquaman's sudden change in appearance and outlook, Qwsp becomes a deadly threat to Earth, starting with manipulating the fight between the princes Yz and Lkz. Captain Marvel and Green Lantern petition the 5th Dimension Imps to take action against Qwsp. Qwsp is trapped in an eighth-dimensional maze for his actions.

When Spectre throws Jakeem Thunder and Johnny Thunderbolt into the 5th Dimension, they unknowingly free Qwsp, who possesses Jakeem and incites a war in the 5th Dimension. Saradin, the first human to control Thunderbolt, figures out that Jakeem is possessed by Qwsp, pulls him out of Jakeem, and binds Qwsp to his capsule of life's blood before getting away.

In the series JSA, Qwsp appears as a member of the Injustice Society, having been masquerading as Light.
