= Kid Flash =

DC Comics character

- Wally West as the first Kid Flash, as depicted in The Flash #110 (December 1959). Art by Carmine Infantino.
- Publisher: DC Comics
- First appearance: The Flash #110 (December 1959)
- Created by: John Broome (writer); Carmine Infantino (artist)
- Characters: Wally West; Bart Allen; Wallace "Ace" West
- See also: The Flash; Impulse (DC Comics)

Kid Flash is the name of several superheroes appearing in comic books published by DC Comics, originally created by John Broome and Carmine Infantino, as a junior counterpart to DC Comics superhero The Flash. The first version of the character, Wally West, debuted in The Flash #110 (1959). The character, along with others like the first Wonder Girl, Aqualad, and Speedy, was created in response to the success of Batman's young sidekick Robin. These young heroes would later be spun off into their own superhero team, the Teen Titans. As Kid Flash, Wally West made regular appearances in Flash related comic books, CW's The Flash series and other DC Comics publications from 1959 through the mid-1980s until the character was reinvented as the new version of The Flash.

Later, well after Wally West had made a name for himself as the new Flash, the character of Bart Allen, grandson of the Flash Barry Allen, was brought into the past from his home in the future and served as the young hero Impulse. In 2003, with writer Geoff Johns' relaunch of a new Teen Titans volume, Bart donned the mantle of Kid Flash after being nearly killed by the assassin Deathstroke. As Kid Flash, Bart appeared in Teen Titans and The Flash (vol. 2) regularly until the Infinite Crisis event, where he became the fourth Flash after Wally West's disappearance. Bart was killed by the Rogues, but was resurrected in the 31st century by Legion of Super-Heroes member Brainiac 5 and retook the mantle of Kid Flash. Following a 2011 reboot, DC introduced a new interpretation of Wally West as its latest Kid Flash in 2014, who was later established as being the original Wally's younger cousin Ace West.

The Wally West Kid Flash was first adapted for live action in the Arrowverse series of TV shows, portrayed by Keiynan Lonsdale.

== Fictional character biographies ==
=== Wally West ===
Wally West in his second Kid Flash costume, in The New Teen Titans # 31 (May 1983). Art by George Pérez.

Outside of Iris West, Kid Flash was the first person to whom Flash revealed the secret of his double-identity (The Flash #120 (May 1961)). In that story, the two speedsters are inadvertently thrown 25 million years into the past, where they battle a race of golden humanoids. It is only the first of many time-trips for the pair, who teamed up next to try out Flash's Cosmic Treadmill.

Shortly after meeting Flash's friend Elongated Man, Kid Flash receives his own unique costume. The Flash, who had been toying with a new design for Wally, is inspecting an alien mind over-matter machine when, in a burst of light, the new costume springs from his mind and onto the body of his protégé. Since the new outfit exposes Wally's red hair, Flash provides his costume-storage ring with a special instant-dye spray with which he could easily change his hair color to brown.

Wally first meets Robin and Aqualad in The Brave and the Bold #54 (June–July 1964), in an adventure that would predicate the formation of the Teen Titans shortly thereafter. Kid Flash remains a member in good standing of that team, though his participation limits his involvement in solo adventures considerably. At 18, Wally revealed his alter-ego to his parents Bob and Mary for the first time, chooses his university (Taggart), and confides to the Flash his intentions to retire from heroics upon graduation to live a normal life.

Prior to his retirement, Wally leaves the Teen Titans for personal reasons, including a desire to devote more time to studying, to his new girlfriend Frances Kane, and because, as a result of his changing metabolism, he was beginning to lose his powers. He comes out of retirement to fight in Crisis on Infinite Earths, and is deeply impacted after Barry Allen sacrifices himself to save the multiverse. A blast from the Anti-Monitor reduces Wally's top speed to that of sound, but cures his metabolism. This, combined with the desire to honor his mentor and friend, causes Wally to discard his Kid Flash identity and adopt the name and costume of Flash. Wally becomes faster than Barry and acquires unique abilities such as sharing and stealing speed and accessing the Speed Force itself, allowing time travel. When Barry is resurrected, Wally takes on his own version of the Flash costume, fighting alongside Barry and Barry's grandson Bart Allen.

=== Bart Allen ===
Bart as Kid Flash. Interior artwork from Teen Titans vol. 3, 4 (Dec, 2003) Art by Mike McKone.

Bart Allen is Barry Allen's grandson from the future, known as the hero Impulse. He was brought to the present day to cure his metabolism, which caused him to age rapidly. After Max Mercury disappears into the timestream, Bart takes up residence in Keystone City with Jay Garrick, the original Flash, and Jay's wife Joan.

A mysterious android from the future known as Indigo attacks the Titans and Young Justice, resulting in the deaths of Donna Troy and Omen. At Donna's funeral, Nightwing disbands the Titans. The members of Young Justice, especially Wonder Girl, feel responsible for Donna and Omen's deaths. This leads Wonder Girl, Robin, Impulse and Superboy to form a new group of Teen Titans under the guidance of the more experienced Cyborg, Starfire, and Beast Boy. Despite Wally West's misgivings, Bart accepts an invitation to join the new Teen Titans.

Bart is later injured after being shot in the leg by Deathstroke, who has been possessed by his son Jericho. His accelerated healing enables a handful of surgeons to replace his kneecap with an artificial one. Bart recovers within hours, but the effects of this encounter are much more than physical. Feeling unsure and tired of being underestimated, Bart goes to a local library and reads every single book in the building. With a renewed sense of confidence, Bart returns to the team as Kid Flash.

When Superboy-Prime runs amok during Infinite Crisis, Kid Flash and the other speedsters race to stop his rampage. While running to subdue Prime, Wally West disappears in a burst of lightning. Meanwhile, the speedsters defeat Prime, but severe their connection to the Speed Force in the process. Bart returns to warn the heroes of Prime's escape. But while mere moments had passed in the present, Bart returns from his time-bending journey four years older. Bart hands his grandfather's costume to Jay Garrick, claiming he used up all his speed powers during the final battle.

Bart retains his powers, but retires due to his guilt over Superboy-Prime's escape. He takes a job as a factory worker in Keystone City, but soon realizes he must use his abilities to protect innocents. Although Bart finds new challenges in harnessing the speed force, he becomes the latest incarnation of the Flash. In his efforts to tame the Speed Force, Bart turns to S.T.A.R. Labs intern Valerie Perez, with whom he falls in love.

After accepting the mantle of the Flash, Bart moves to Los Angeles, California and enrolls in the Police Academy. Robin asks him to join the Titans, but Bart declines, saying he would ather work towards membership in the Justice League of America. Shortly after resuming the mantle, Iris Allen warns Bart that if he fought the newly formed league of Rogues, he would not survive. Inertia, in a plan to steal the Speed Force for himself, manipulates the Rogues into battle with Bart, during which Bart is killed.

Later on New Earth, during the Final Crisis storyline, Superman is called to the 31st century to assist the Legion of Super-Heroes in fending off Superboy-Prime, who was thrown to the future in the aftermath of the destruction of Earth-51 and the Sinestro Corps War. Prime, raging about his minor place in history as a Superman rival, releases the Legion of Super-Villains from the prison planet Takron-Galtos and wages war on Earth and the Legion. In response to this, Brainiac 5 summons the Legions of Three Worlds (alternate earths) to combat Prime's forces. Revealing that the Legion had captured "living lightning" in the Legion's last trip to present Earth in The Lightning Saga, Brainiac 5 has Legionnaire XS run on the cosmic treadmill while the three Lightning Lads activates the "lightning rod" to release the living lightning, resurrecting Bart.

When the New 52 universe began, the Kid Flash working with the Titans was known as Bart Allen. He ended up with a different backstory, and eventually was written out of the storyline. He was later replaced as Kid Flash by Wally's cousin, Wallace West.

=== Wallace West ===
Wallace "Ace" West is the third Kid Flash of the main DC Comics Universe. He first appeared in The Flash (vol. 4) Annual #3. He is the son of the fifth Reverse Flash, Daniel West, and cousin of the first Kid Flash and third Flash, Wally West. Originally intended as a reinterpretation of Wally for the New 52, he was established as a separate character in DC Rebirth.

== In other media ==
=== Television ===
- The Wally West incarnation of Kid Flash appears in The Superman/Aquaman Hour of Adventure, voiced by Tommy Cook.
- The Wally West incarnation of Kid Flash appears in Teen Titans, voiced by Michael Rosenbaum.
- The Wally West incarnation of Kid Flash appears in Batman: The Brave and the Bold, voiced by Hunter Parrish.
- The Wally West and Bart Allen incarnations of Kid Flash appear in Young Justice, voiced by Jason Spisak and Jason Marsden respectively.
- The Bart Allen incarnation of Kid Flash appears in the Mad episode "That's What Super Friends Are For", voiced again by Jason Marsden.
- The Wally West incarnation of Kid Flash appears in Teen Titans Go!, voiced by Will Friedle.
- The Wally West incarnation of Kid Flash appears as a non-speaking cameo in DC Nation Shorts.
- The Wally West incarnation of Kid Flash appears in the Robot Chicken episode "Bring a Sidekick to Work Day", voiced by Seth Green.

==== Arrowverse ====
A character based on Wally and Wallace West named Wallace F. "Wally" West appears in media set in the Arrowverse, portrayed by Keiynan Lonsdale. Introduced in and primarily appearing in The Flash, he also appears in the third season of Legends of Tomorrow and the crossover "Crisis on Earth-X".

=== Film ===
- The Wally West incarnation of Kid Flash makes a non-speaking appearance in Justice League: The New Frontier.
- The Wally West incarnation of Kid Flash appears in a flashback in Teen Titans: The Judas Contract, voiced again by Jason Spisak.
- The Wallace West incarnation of Kid Flash appears in Justice League Dark: Apokolips War.
- The Wally West incarnation of Kid Flash makes a non-speaking appearance in Batman and Superman: Battle of the Super Sons.

=== Video games ===
- The Wally West incarnation of Kid Flash appears as a playable character in Young Justice: Legacy, voiced again by Jason Spisak.
- The Wally West and Bart Allen incarnations of Kid Flash appear as character summons in Scribblenauts Unmasked: A DC Comics Adventure.
- The Bart Allen incarnation of Kid Flash appears as an unlockable playable character in Lego Batman 3: Beyond Gotham.
- The Wallace West incarnation of Kid Flash makes a non-speaking cameo appearance in the Flash's ending in Injustice 2.
- The Wallace and Wally West incarnations of Kid Flash appear as playable characters in Lego DC Super-Villains, voiced by Jason Linere White.

=== Miscellaneous ===
The Bart Allen incarnation of Kid Flash appears in the Injustice: Gods Among Us prequel comic.
