= Black Flash =

- Black Flash, as appeared in The Flash #140 (June 1998). Art by Pop Mhan (pencils), Chris Ivy (inks), Tom McCraw (colors)

Publication information
- Publisher: DC Comics
- First appearance: The Flash vol. 2 #138 (June 1998; cameo); The Flash vol. 2 #141 (September 1998; full)
- Created by: Grant Morrison; Mark Millar; Ron Wagner

In-story information
- Species: Meta-Zombie
- Team affiliations: Rogues
- Notable aliases: Black Flash, Flashback, Backflash, Slow Lightning
- Abilities: Speed Force includes: Immense superhuman speed, agility, durability and reflexes; Time manipulation, role as psychopomp to speedsters; Immortality; Molecular acceleration; Energy absorption; Dimensional travel; Time travel; Electrokinesis; Intangibility

The Black Flash is a comic book character from DC Comics. Created by writers Grant Morrison and Mark Millar, and artist Ron Wagner, the character had cameos in The Flash vol. 2 #138 (June 1998), before appearing in full in The Flash vol. 2 #141 (September 1998).

== Fictional character background ==
=== Original depiction ===
The Black Flash essentially fulfills the same role as Death for those who possess super-speed in the DC Universe, returning the speedster to their power source: the Speed Force. The Black Flash represents the Speed Force's dark aspect, with his connection to death being limited to those connected to the Speed Force.

The Black Flash comes for Wally West to draw back to the Speed Force, but instead takes Linda Park, who is struck by the lightning that was intended to kill Wally. The Black Flash later returns to try to take Wally again, freezing time except for those who possess a connection to the Speed Force. Wally defeats the Black Flash by racing him to the end of time, to a point where death has no meaning, causing the Black Flash to dissipate.

The Black Flash appears to Bart Allen when he loses his powers while battling the Rogues at the Getty Center. Shortly afterward, Bart is killed in battle with the Rogues.

The Black Flash is sent hunting after the Force Barrier's destruction, killing Psych and attacking Steadfast and Fuerza. Hunter Zolomon, enhanced with the Sage Force, Strength Force, and Still Force, takes Barry Allen into the Forever Force. The Black Flash chases down Barry and Zoom, hoping to heal the Speed Force. Zoom sacrifices himself to heal the Speed Force, trapping the Black Flash.

=== Barry Allen ===
The second Black Flash is Barry Allen, who was transformed due to Eobard Thawne altering the Speed Force.

=== Eobard Thawne ===
The third Black Flash is Eobard Thawne, who was resurrected and equipped with a power ring as a member of the Black Lantern Corps.

== Other versions ==
An original incarnation of the Black Flash, Jesse Quick, appears in Ame-Comi Girls: Featuring Duela Dent #3.

== In other media ==
=== Television ===
An original incarnation of the Black Flash, Hunter Zolomon, appears in the Arrowverse series The Flash (2014).

=== Video games ===
- The original Black Flash appears in Justice League Heroes: The Flash.
- The original Black Flash appears in Scribblenauts Unmasked: A DC Comics Adventure.
- The Eobard Thawne incarnation of the Black Flash appears as an alternate skin for Barry Allen / Flash in Injustice: Gods Among Us.
- The original incarnation of the Black Flash appears in DC Legends.

=== Miscellaneous ===
The Black Flash appears in Smallville Season 11 #12. It seeks out Impulse and Jay Garrick's souls, but comes into conflict with the former and Superman. The Black Flash primarily focuses its attention on Impulse, who sacrifices himself to destroy it.
