= Max Mercury =

Fictional character

- Quality Comics' Quicksilver, retooled as Max Mercury. Art by Nick Cardy.

Publication information
- Publisher: Quality Comics; DC Comics (current owner)
- First appearance: As Quicksilver: National Comics #5 (November 1940); As Max Mercury: Flash (vol. 2) #76 (May 1993)
- Created by: Jack Cole, Chuck Mazoujian; Revamped by: Mark Waid

In-story information
- Alter ego: Maxwell Crandall
- Species: Metahuman
- Team affiliations: Freedom Fighters; All-Star Squadron; Justice League
- Partnerships: Wally West; Bart Allen
- Notable aliases: Ahwehota, Windrunner, Whip Whirlwind, Lightning, Bluestreak, Quicksilver, Buckshot, The Zen Master of Speed
- Abilities: Super speed Molecular control Time and dimensional travel

Max Mercury (Maxwell Crandall), also known as Windrunner, Whip Whirlwind, and Lightning, is a DC Comics superhero similar to Quality Comics' Quicksilver. Initially an obscure speedster, the character was rebooted by Mark Waid in 1993 in the pages of The Flash and made a mentor to Wally West and Bart Allen.

Max Mercury appears in the television series The Flash, portrayed by Trevor Carroll.

== Publication history ==
=== Quality Comics ===
He first appeared in Quality's National Comics #5, cover dated November 1940, as Quicksilver. Comics historian Don Markstein calls Quicksilver "probably the first imitator of the Flash's super-speed schtick".

Almost nothing was revealed about the character except that he possessed super-speed and had previously worked as a circus acrobat. In fact, after about a third of his feature's run, his superhuman speed was downplayed, or phased out altogether. He appeared in National Comics until issue #73 (Aug 1949). He also made an appearance in Uncle Sam Quarterly (Winter 1941).

=== DC Comics ===
Due to Quicksilver's indistinct background, Mark Waid was able to reinvent the character in The Flash without contradicting previously established continuity. The character was renamed Max Mercury to avoid confusion with Marvel Comics' Quicksilver.

== Fictional character biography ==
In Waid's origin of the character, he was originally a scout with the US Cavalry in the 1830s. A friend of the local Indian tribes, he was shocked and dismayed to find them massacred on the orders of his commanding officer. Enchanted by a dying Indian shaman, he gained superhuman speed. In the years that followed, he became known to the Indians as Ahwehota ("He Who Runs Beyond The Wind"), and to everyone else as Windrunner.

Mercury has repeatedly traveled through time, seeking to enter the so-called Speed Force. He usually bounces off and finds himself decades in the future. His first attempt left him in the 1890s, where he created a new identity for himself as Whip Whirlwind. Later, he traveled ahead again, and was active in the 1930s and 1940s as Quicksilver, where he acted as a mentor to the fledgling Golden Age Flash and Johnny Quick.

According to Jess Nevins' Encyclopedia of Golden Age Superheroes, "Quicksilver fights the Axis mesmerist Baron Hoff, the circus aerialists the Black Cats, the mad scientist Dr. Morlo, the Human Fly, the Screaming Skull, the Witch Doctor, and the Speed Demons, whose super-speed is derived from special pills".

In 1948, he had an affair with the wife of a doctor who had saved his life. When the doctor learned of this and his wife returned to her husband's side, Max fled into the future once more. He then reappeared in the early 1960s, where he battled Savitar and was bounced still further forward in time. He spent some years in hiding, but was persuaded by Garrick to return to action against Professor Zoom (who was posing as Barry Allen). Max Mercury has been the mentor of first Wally West and later Bart Allen (alias Impulse). He taught West about the Speed Force, and helped him to access his full speed by encouraging him to break a mental block he had placed on his powers—stopping Wally from being as fast as Barry because he would then have really replaced his uncle as the Flash. He also attempted to teach Impulse a measure of patience with varying results. While living with Bart, Max met an aged physician named Helen Claiborne, who turned out to be his daughter from his earlier affair.

In Impulse #88 (2002), Max is possessed by the spirit of a Golden Age supervillain: the Rival. While still in Max's body, the Rival escapes to an unknown place in time.

In Infinite Crisis (2006), Max appears in the Speed Force, where his spirit was imprisoned after the Rival possessed him. Max assists Johnny Quick, Bart Allen, and other speedsters in taking Superboy-Prime to a realm beyond the Speed Force.

Max later appears in The Flash: Rebirth (2009), where Barry Allen frees him from the Negative Speed Force controlled by Professor Zoom.

== Powers and abilities ==
Max is a human granted superhuman speed by ancient Native American rituals. His speed is enough that he can accelerate well beyond the standard Mach 1 super-speed limit, or the speed of sound; though he cannot reach escape velocity. Over time, he tried to find the fuel for his powers (and those of other speedsters): the Speed Force. Though he never quite entered it nor obtained its energies to power his speed, his attempts allowed him to travel forward through time.

Among his peers, Max is unique in his attempts to understand the Speed Force in a mystical way (referred to by other characters as "Zen"). He also differs from other speedsters because of his agility; he cannot run as quickly as the Flashes, but he has a greater ability to perform acrobatic stunts and finely coordinated actions.

== Other versions ==
An alternate universe version of Max Mercury from the Flashpoint timeline appears in the Flashpoint tie-in Kid Flash Lost. After becoming connected to the Black Flash, Bart Allen kills Mercury to give Barry Allen enough power to undo the Flashpoint timeline.

== In other media ==
- Max Mercury appears in The Flash episode "A New World" Pt. 4, portrayed by Trevor Carroll. This version was chosen by the Flash to become a speedster.
- Two Max Mercury figures were released as a part of HeroClix's "The Flash" set.
- DC Direct released a six-inch figure of Max Mercury in 2000.
- Maxwell Crandall as Whip Whirlwind and Max Mercury makes a cameo appearance in Superman via a mural.
