= Ace West =

- Ace West, the fourth Kid Flash in the DC Rebirth era. Art by Jim Lee.

Publication information
- Publisher: DC Comics
- First appearance: The Flash (vol. 4) Annual #3 (June 2014)
- Created by: Van Jensen; Robert Venditti; Ron Frenz; Brett Booth; (inspired by Wally West/Kid Flash by John Broome and Carmine Infantino)

In-story information
- Alter ego: Wallace Daniel "Ace" West
- Species: Metahuman
- Team affiliations: Flash Family; Teen Titans; Defiance; Justice League; Speed Force
- Partnerships: Speedster partners: Avery Ho; Barry Allen; Wally West; Other hero partners: Deathstroke; Damian Wayne; Emiko Queen
- Abilities: See list: Superhuman speed, reflexes, agility, stamina, and durability; Speed force aura conduit connection; Phasing; Accelerated healing; Molecular acceleration; Dimensional travel; Time travel; Aerokinesis; Electrokinesis; Electro-blast; Electromagnetism; Energy construct creation; Light projection; Speed force absorption and negation; Enhanced senses; Energy absorption; Energy transference; Speed Force constructs; Frictionless speed force aura; Speed steal; Telekinesis; Astral projection; Vortex creations; Basic hand-to-hand combatant

Wallace Daniel "Ace" West is a superhero appearing in American comic books published by DC Comics. Originally introduced as a biracial interpretation of Wally West as part of DC's The New 52 relaunch, the comic DC Rebirth #1 later established that he is actually a new character of the same name, being Wally's cousin and the son of the Reverse-Flash (Daniel West), both named after their great-grandfather. To avoid confusion, the character was renamed in later comics as Wallace West, and later simply as Ace West. Forming the speedster duo "Speed Force" with his love interest Avery Ho, the two serve as the main characters of the ongoing series Speed Force.

The character was inspired by a desire to feature an African-American iteration of Wally West in the Arrowverse series The Flash following the similarly black Jesse L. Martin's and Candice Patton's respective castings as Joe and Iris West. Ultimately, Keiynan Lonsdale was cast as the character, depicted as West's long-lost brother. Lonsdale reprised the role in Legends of Tomorrow and Supergirl.

== Publication history ==
The "reintroduction" of this character to DC Comics following its 2011 The New 52 reboot, which removed Wally West from continuity, was first announced in January 2014. Originally conceived as a biracial reinterpretation of the classic Wally West character. Wallace/Ace is stated in his introductory comics and creators as being the son of Iris West's brother Rudy, as in pre-New 52 stories. However, the original interpretation of Wally West, having been the starring character in the Flash for many years, was still missed by DC's fans, and so the company decided to bring the original Wally back into continuity in Geoff Johns' DC Rebirth #1 (2016). Rebirth retroactively established that the character's father was not Rudy, as previously stated; he was the son of Iris's other brother, Daniel West / Reverse Flash. Following his cousin's reintroduction, the character was depicted as going by their full name "Wallace", and later a new nickname, "Ace", becoming the love interest of fellow speedster Avery Ho (the Flash of China), with the duo serving as the main characters of the ongoing series Speed Force.

== Fictional character biography ==
Wallace "Ace" West (then-referred to as simply "Wally") first appears in The Flash (vol. 4) Annual #3 (June 2014) in a story set twenty years in the future, when a jaded, older Flash (Barry Allen) reads about the character's funeral and vows to change history. Tying in with the ongoing story The New 52: Futures End, the story The Flash: Futures End #1 depicts an encounter between Barry of five years in the future (when Wallace is supposed to die) and the Barry of 20 years in the future, who is out to prevent it. In the course of the story, Wallace ends up learning that Barry is the Flash and absorbs part of the Speed Force — the source of the Flash's abilities — during the battle between Barry and his future counterpart. He becomes a speedster but his hero career is short-lived; he sacrifices himself to fix a wound in the speed force. Due to the effects of time travel, however, this has implications for Wallace earlier in his history. Around the same time, in the present-day narrative of The Flash, Barry meets Wallace for the first time through Iris. He is struck by lightning and acquires super-speed abilities; an apparition of his future explains that, as a consequence of how his future-self had died repairing the Speed Force, all the power within him was able to travel back in time and use Wallace's lightning accident as a catalyst. Wallace's first act as a speedster is to use his powers to protect a classmate from a bully, using the same artistic elements as Professor Zoom's powers.

DC Rebirth #1, part of a company-wide event of the same name, marked DC's attempts to restore much of what it lost in the New 52 reboot, both in tone and in the stories of its characters. It features Wally West watching his younger cousin, Wallace, from outside of time, proud and amazed that he too has become a speedster, and reflecting on how they are both named for the same grandfather. Wally is brought back to reality by Barry, who remembers him for the first time since the events of Flashpoint. Teen Titans Rebirth #1, shows Wallace joining the Teen Titans superhero team as Kid Flash.

Wallace, as Kid Flash, meets Wally West, as the Flash, when assisting Barry in dealing with a bridge accident, although Wally does not explicitly introduce himself to his cousin, simply identifying himself as an ally of Barry, although Wallace accepts him after they work together to save Barry from a temporary infusion of Speed Force energy.

On meeting the Flash of China Avery Ho, Ace and Avery fall in love, and the two form the superhero speedster duo/team Speed Force.

== Powers and abilities ==
Ace possesses all the abilities typical of a Speed Force conduit including superhuman speed that enables him to run at speeds exceeding the speed of light. He also possesses other abilities such as superhuman durability, accelerated healing, and electrokinesis.

== Alternate versions ==
=== Futures End ===
In The Flash: Futures End #1, the Flash from 20 years in the future prevents Wallace's death by killing Daniel West. After the Future Flash cripples his younger self in their fight and disappears into the past, Barry finds that Wallace has been imbued with the Speed Force. He makes Wallace promise to stop his future self and Wallace dons a silver and red Flash suit, becoming the new Flash, and trains for years to travel back and stop the Future Flash.

In The Flash (vol. 4) #35, Wallace arrives to see the Future Flash fight the present Flash. Wallace is badly injured when he shields the younger Flash from high-speed rocks that the Future Flash flung. Wallace absorbs the excess Speed Force energy that is tearing apart the present Flash and tells him to not give up and that he only learned to be a hero because of him. Wallace dies and releases a blast of Speed Force energy that closes the rupture, but unintentionally traps the present Flash in the Speed Force.

== In other media ==
=== Television ===
Wallace F. "Wally" West appears in media set in the Arrowverse, portrayed by Keiynan Lonsdale. This version is the younger brother of Iris West and son of Joe and Francine West, with the latter having raised Wally away from the rest of his family before Iris and Joe learn of him following Francine's death. Additionally, Wally is described as "a bit of a wayward kid who has some attitude problems and some authority issues and is quick with a sassy remark".

- Introduced as a civilian in the second season of The Flash, Wally becomes Kid Flash in the third season, originally due to Barry Allen creating and undoing the "Flashpoint" timeline before Doctor Alchemy restores the former's powers to free his master Savitar from the Speed Force. Despite this, Wally becomes Barry's partner in crime-fighting and briefly dates Jesse Quick until she breaks up with him in the fourth season. Following this, he would temporarily join the Legends (see below) and eventually leaves for Keystone City to find himself.
- Wally also appears in the third season of Legends of Tomorrow and the crossover "Crisis on Earth-X".

=== Film ===
Ace West / Kid Flash makes a non-speaking cameo appearance in Justice League Dark: Apokolips War as a member of the Teen Titans who is killed by Paradooms.

=== Video games ===
- Ace West / Kid Flash makes a cameo appearance in the Flash's ending in Injustice 2.
- Ace West / Kid Flash appears as a playable character in Lego DC Super-Villains, voiced by Jason Linere White.
