= Reverse-Flash =

Rivals of the Flash

The Reverse-Flash is a name used by several supervillains appearing in American comic books published by DC Comics. Each iteration of the character serves as a foil and an enemy of the Flash.

== Characters ==
=== Edward Clariss ===
Edward Clariss
- The Rival (a proto-version of the Reverse-Flash) by Stephen Sadowski (penciller), Michael Bair (inker), and John Kalisz (colorist)

Publication information
- Publisher: DC Comics
- First appearance: Flash Comics #104 (February 1949)
- Created by: John Broome; Joe Kubert

In-story information
- Team affiliations: Injustice Society
- Notable aliases: Rival
- Abilities: Flash

Edward Clariss (also known as the Rival and the Rival Flash) first appeared in Flash Comics #104 (February 1949), and was created by John Broome and Joe Kubert.

==== Publication history ====
Edward Clariss first appeared in Jay Garrick's final appearance in Flash Comics #104 (February 1949), and was created by John Broome and Joe Kubert as an evil counterpart of Garrick during the Golden Age of Comic Books. He would be revived by Geoff Johns and David Goyer in a story called "Injustice Be Done" from the Justice Society of America comic books through the Modern Age of Comic Books.

==== Fictional character biography ====
A precursor of the Reverse-Flash, Dr. Edward Clariss was a professor at the university attended by the Golden Age Flash, and had recreated the formula which was behind Jay Garrick's speed. He hears Joan Williams talking about how the Flash's own speed was given to another student, which helped him develop the formula. Bitter at the scientific community's rejection of his claims, Clariss becomes a criminal. He uses a similar darker version of the Flash with a mask over his head, and gives the formula to other criminals. The Rival's version of the formula is temporary, and he is captured and jailed. Later stories have indicated a possible link between his formula and the Velocity 9 created by Vandal Savage, but no such link has been conclusively proven.

JSA #16 (November 2000) contains a flashback to a battle between the Rival and the Flash several months after the former's first appearance. Now that he has inexplicably regained super-speed, Clariss reaches light speed during the fight and vanishes into the Speed Force. After the Justice Society of America's reformation 50 years later, Johnny Sorrow retrieves Clariss from the Speed Force and invites him to join the Injustice Society. Driven insane in the Speed Force, the Rival races across the country on a killing spree. The Flash realizes that the Rival's path across the country spells out Clariss's name and the final murder victim will be Joan; Jay absorbs the Rival's speed before he can kill Joan.

A robot of the Golden Age Reverse-Flash was seen in one panel of The Flash (vol. 2) #134 (February 1998), where he is defeated by Garrick.

The Rival returns in Impulse #88 (September 2002), posing as Joan's doctor. Now pure speed energy, he possesses fellow Golden Age speedster Max Mercury. After battling Jay and Impulse, Max time-travels to an unknown destination. In The Flash: Rebirth #4, Max escapes from the Speed Force and is rejuvenated by Wally West's energy, which allows Max to return to Earth in a new body.

==== Return ====
After the events of Doomsday Clock, Clariss returns to continuity, having faced Garrick in the 1940s. Later, in a flashback to Jay's origin, it is revealed that Clariss was a fellow student and peer of Jay's at Midwestern University who was almost picked by Professor Hughes to help him in his experiments with hard water vapors until Hughes decided to go with Garrick because he thought Clariss would question him too much about the true purpose of the experiment.

=== Eobard Thawne ===
Professor Eobard Thawne (commonly known as Professor Zoom) is the archenemy of Barry Allen, as he is the first supervillain to be called the Reverse-Flash. While other speedsters cannot change the past without dramatic consequences, his ability to travel and manipulate time is able to drastically alter history and completely erase people from existence is due to having corrupted the Speed Force which created a negative version.

=== Wally West ===
Wally West briefly impersonated Professor Zoom, a.k.a. the Reverse-Flash.

=== Hunter Zolomon ===
Hunter Zolomon (also known as Zoom) is the archenemy of Wally West and the second Reverse-Flash. Unlike all other speedsters, he gained his powers from an accident with the Cosmic Treadmill rather than the Speed Force. Zolomon can control the rate at which he moves in time via the Forever Force.

=== Thaddeus Thawne ===
Thaddeus Thawne (a.k.a. Inertia and later Kid Zoom) first appeared in Impulse #51 (August 1999), and was created by Todd Dezago and Mike Wieringo. Another character called the Reverse-Flash, he is a clone of Bart Allen. When asked who created Inertia, Ethan Van Sciver wrote that he could only accept five percent of the credit; the remaining credit belonged to Mike Wieringo (20 percent), Grant Morrison (25 percent), and Todd Dezago (50 percent). According to Van Sciver, Inertia's appearance is an inverted depiction of Impulse.

Inertia appears in Teen Titans (vol. 3) as part of Titans East. The storyline concluded with issue #46 (April 2007). When Bart aged five years after Infinite Crisis and became the Flash, Inertia battles Bart again, ultimately killing him alongside the Rogues. Wally West takes revenge by draining Inertia's powers, paralyzing him.

Inertia remains disconnected from the Speed Force after Infinite Crisis and uses the drug Velocity 9 to regain his powers. In Final Crisis: Rogues' Revenge, Libra and Zoom use Inertia in an attempt to get the Rogues to join the Secret Society. Inertia steals Zoom's powers and calls himself Kid Zoom, only to be killed by the Rogues, who blame him for making them kill Bart.

Inertia is later resurrected, but is trapped in the Speed Force. Inertia tries to stop Barry Allen, Max Mercury, and Jesse Quick from escaping the Speed Force, revealing that Eobard Thawne promised to release him and let him take over Bart's body once the former succeeded in his plans. After Barry tries to appeal and talk sense into him, Inertia stops his attacks and runs off.

=== Daniel West ===
Daniel "Danny" West first appeared in The Flash (vol. 4) #0 (November 2012). The most recent individual to be called the Reverse-Flash, he is the younger brother of Iris West, the father of Ace West, and an enemy of Barry Allen.

== Other versions ==
Reverse-Flash / Lia Nelson in Tangent Comics

An original incarnation of the Reverse-Flash appears in Tangent Comics: The Flash #1 (December 1997). This version is an evil, negative ionic energy-based duplicate of her Earth's Flash, Lia Nelson, who was created by an evil government agency to disperse Nelson's photon-based form. However, Nelson destroys the Reverse-Flash.

== In other media ==
=== Television ===
- An android replica of the Flash, based on the Reverse-Flash's design, appears in the Justice League Unlimited episode "Divided We Fall".
- Three variations of individuals who have used the Reverse-Flash moniker in the comics and one original incarnation appear in The Flash (2014).
  - Eobard Thawne / Reverse-Flash primarily appears in the first season and sporadically throughout subsequent seasons, portrayed by Tom Cavanagh and Matt Letscher.
  - Hunter Zolomon / Zoom primarily appears in the second season, portrayed by Teddy Sears and voiced by Tony Todd.
  - Edward Clariss / The Rival appears in the third season, portrayed by Todd Lasance. This version is a black-suited speedster and archenemy of Kid Flash in the Flashpoint timeline. After the Flash restores the original timeline, "Alchemy" restores Clariss's powers. He subsequently tries to kill the Flash, only to be defeated by the latter and later murdered by Savitar.
  - The Reverse-Flash identity is temporarily assumed by Barry Allen due to the "Reverse-Flashpoint" timeline in the eighth season.
- The Eobard Thawne incarnation of the Reverse-Flash makes non-speaking cameo appearances in Harley Quinn.

=== Film ===
- The Eobard Thawne incarnation of the Reverse-Flash appears in Lego DC Comics Super Heroes: The Flash, voiced by Dwight Schultz.
- The Eobard Thawne incarnation of the Reverse-Flash makes a cameo appearance in Injustice.

=== Video games ===
- The Eobard Thawne incarnation of the Reverse-Flash appears in the mobile version of Injustice: Gods Among Us.
- The Eobard Thawne incarnation of the Reverse-Flash appears as a playable character in Lego Batman 3: Beyond Gotham, voiced by Liam O'Brien.
- The Eobard Thawne incarnation of the Reverse-Flash appears as a "premier skin" for the Flash in Injustice 2, voiced again by Liam O'Brien.
- The Eobard Thawne incarnation of the Reverse-Flash appears in Lego DC Super-Villains, voiced by C. Thomas Howell.

== See also ==
- Blur, a White Martian/human hybrid who appeared in the Son of Vulcan miniseries
- Johnny Quick, the Flash's evil counterpart from Earth-3 and member of the Crime Syndicate of America
- List of Flash enemies
