= Speedster (fiction) =

Type of superhero possessing superhuman speed

Cover to The Flash #750 (March 2020), showing the title character with fellow speedsters

A speedster is a character, primarily in superhero comics, whose powers primarily relate to superhuman speed (also known as superspeed). The primary abilities shared by all speedsters include running at speeds far in excess of human capability (to varying degrees) and resistance to the side effects of such velocities (air resistance, inability to breathe, dynamic shock resulting from contact with objects at high speed, etc.). In almost all cases, speedsters can physically attack opponents by striking them at high speed, imparting great kinetic energy without themselves being harmed or at times even affected at all. A variety of other powers have been attributed to speedsters, depending on the story, their power's origin, and their universe's established continuity and rules.

== Plausibility and artistic license ==
The use of speedsters in fiction requires artistic license due to the laws of physics that would prohibit such abilities. Moving at the speed of sound, for example, would create sonic booms that are usually not heard in such stories, and generate substantial heat. An enormous amount of energy would also be required to achieve such speeds, and speedsters would need to consume massive amounts of calories to sustain their energy.

The Official Handbook of the Marvel Universe states that the character Nova maintains speeds which can be considered "modest", especially when carrying a passenger. It also concedes that a solid object moving in the Earth's atmosphere at several times the speed of sound or faster would wreak havoc on the planet, and that moving at such speeds would prohibit Northstar from breathing, while the generated wind/friction would ravage his body. On the other hand, it states that the character Quicksilver was born with adaptations that make high speeds possible, such as enhanced cardiovascular, respiratory, musculature, and digestive systems, a more efficient metabolism, better lubricated joints, tendons with the tensile strength of spring steel, unidentified bone composition that can withstand the dynamic shock of his feet touching the ground at speeds over 100 miles an hour, and a brain that can process information fast enough for him to react to his surroundings at high speed.

Writer John Byrne maintained modest abilities for the speedster character Danny Hilltop in his series Next Men. Although Danny can keep pace with a race car, the friction generated by his speed melts any footwear he wears, burning his feet. As a result, Danny runs barefoot, having toughened the soles of his feet through a regimen of pounding increasingly harder materials.

== In other media ==
Speedster characters appear in other media such as film, video games, anime and manga, the most notable being the video game character Sonic the Hedgehog and supporting characters, and Looney Tunes characters Speedy Gonzales and the Road Runner.

Others include:

- Characters in the My Hero Academia franchise, Deku, All Might, and Tenya Ida/Ingenium have been noted to have super speed thanks to their "Quirks" or genetic mutation powers that grant them super human abilities. In the Vigilantes spin-off series, No. 6 has more traditional speedster powers. His "Quirk" was stolen from a hero named O'clock; No. 6's idol and blatant reference to the Flash. However, the series protagonist (Koichi Haimawari/The Crawler) is eventually able to surpass him in speed.
- The Streak in The 7th Portal possesses superhuman speed.
- Characters in the Dragon Ball franchise including Goku and Frieza.
- Speed from Sky High.
- Daphne Millbrook from the NBC television superhero drama Heroes.
- Characters in the manga One-Punch Man, including Saitama, Flashy Flash, and Speed o' Sound Sonic.
- Dash Parr from the Pixar motion picture The Incredibles.
- Bree Davenport, the bionic hero from the Disney XD television series Lab Rats.
- Mr. Quick, a recurring character from the Disney XD television series Mighty Med.
- Billy "Kid Quick" Thunderman, a main character from the Nickelodeon television series The Thundermans.
- Characters in the comic book The Boys and its television adaptation, including A-Train, Shockwave, and Mister Marathon.
- Race Noble from the comic book Noble Causes.
- Josef / Red Rush from the comic book Invincible and its television adaptation.
