= Iris West =

DC Comics character

Iris June-Allen
- Iris West-Allen in The Flash vol.5 #70 (May 2019). Art by Howard Porter.

Publication information
- Publisher: DC Comics
- First appearance: Showcase #4 (October 1956)
- Created by: Robert Kanigher; Carmine Infantino

In-story information
- Full name: Iris Ann West-Allen
- Team affiliations: Galaxy Broadcasting System; Central City Picture News
- Supporting character of: The Flash

Iris Ann West-Allen is a fictional character, a supporting character appearing in American comic books published by DC Comics. She has been the main love interest and later wife of Barry Allen, the alter ego of the Silver Age version of the superhero The Flash, and the aunt and grandmother, respectively, of the Modern Age variations of the characters Wally West and Bart Allen.

On television, she has appeared in various adaptations in other media; the character has been portrayed by Paula Marshall in the 1990 CBS television series and by Candice Patton in the 2014 The CW television series along with appearances in other Arrowverse shows. In the DC Extended Universe feature films, she was portrayed by Kiersey Clemons in Zack Snyder's Justice League (2021) and The Flash (2023).

== Publication history ==
Created by Robert Kanigher and Carmine Infantino, the character made her first appearance in Showcase #4 (October 1956).

== Fictional character biography ==
Iris West works as a reporter for Picture News, based in Central City, and is the fiancée of Barry Allen, who is secretly the Flash. Prior to Barry becoming the Flash, Iris often chides Barry for his frequently being late due to his repeatedly being lost in thought at work as a forensic scientist, a tendency which continues even after he becomes a superhero. When Iris and Barry marry, Iris learns that, not only is Barry the Flash, but her nephew, Wally West, is Kid Flash. She is not told by Barry, but discovers her husband's secret on their wedding night when Barry talks in his sleep. She reveals this to him on their first wedding anniversary. It is later revealed that Iris was born in the 30th century.

After years as a prominent presence in the Flash's life and in Central City, Iris is killed by Professor Zoom during a costume party. Iris' biological parents, the Russells, send her infant future self to the past, where she is adopted by Ira West. Iris' death causes a temporal paradox that is resolved after the Russells place her consciousness into a new body.

Barry and Iris spend a month in the 30th century, during which Iris gives birth to the Tornado Twins, Don and Dawn Allen. Don marries the descendant of Professor Zoom, Meloni Thawne, hoping to end the feud between the two families. They have a son, Bart, whose powers manifest at an early age and cause him to age at an accelerated rate. Dawn marries Jeven Ognats of Aarok and has a daughter, Jenni. Jenni inherits her father's Speed Force abilities and joins the Legion of Super-Heroes as XS. Don and Dawn are killed while saving Earth from an invasion by the Dominators.

=== One Year Later ===
In Final Crisis: Rogues' Revenge, Iris has moved to her old home in Central City where she is seen looking over photographs of Barry, when his disembodied voice calls out to her. Iris later joins a resistance against Darkseid along with Black Lightning, Green Arrow, and Linda Park. Soon after, Iris is corrupted by the Anti-Life Equation, but Barry breaks its hold over her by enveloping her in the Speed Force.

=== The New 52 ===
In September 2011, The New 52 continuity reboot, Iris and Barry are acquaintances rather than lovers. During DC Rebirth, when Iris and Ace West are attacked by Eobard Thawne, Iris receives glimpses of her pre-Flashpoint life with Barry and begins to remember their past together.

== Other versions ==
=== The New Frontier ===
An alternate universe version of Iris West appears in DC: The New Frontier. This version is engaged to Barry Allen. Iris later deduces Barry's secret identity, but does not reveal her knowledge until she convinces Barry to come out of retirement.

=== Amalgam Comics ===
An alternate universe version of Iris West, amalgamated with Roxanne Simpson, appears in the Amalgam Comics one-shot Speed Demon.

=== Flashpoint ===
An alternate universe version of Iris West appears in Flashpoint. This version is unmarried and in a relationship with John, her co-worker at the Central City Citizen.

== In other media ==
=== Television ===
- Iris West appears in The Flash (1990), portrayed by Paula Marshall. This version is a computer graphic artist.
- Iris West appears in Young Justice, voiced by Nicole Dubuc. This version is a reporter for the Galaxy Broadcasting System (GBS).
- Iris West appears in series set in the Arrowverse, portrayed by Candice Patton. This version is African-American, a trait which other portrayals of the character would adopt. Her Earth-2 counterpart, who is a detective, appears as well. Introduced in The Flash (2014), Iris makes subsequent appearances in the crossovers events "Crisis on Earth-X" and "Crisis on Infinite Earths".

=== Film ===
- Iris West appears in Justice League: The New Frontier, voiced by Vicki Lewis. This version is aware of Barry Allen's secret identity, having deduced it herself.
- Iris West appears in Justice League: The Flashpoint Paradox, voiced by Jennifer Hale. In the alternate Flashpoint timeline, she is uninvolved with Barry Allen, and married and had a child with someone else.
- Iris West appears in films set in the Tomorrowverse, voiced by Ashleigh LaThrop.
  - Introduced in Justice Society: World War II, this version is African-American and Barry Allen's girlfriend who he proposes to by the end of the film.
  - West appears in Justice League: Crisis on Infinite Earths.
- Zoe Kazan was going to portray Iris West in Justice League: Mortal prior to its cancellation.

==== DC Extended Universe ====
- Kiersey Clemons was cast as Iris West in Justice League, though her scenes were cut. Her scenes were restored in the director's cut Zack Snyder's Justice League, in which Barry Allen saves Iris from a traffic accident.
- Clemons reprises her role in The Flash (2023), which is a part of the DC Extended Universe.

=== Miscellaneous ===
- Iris Allen appears in the Justice League novel Flash: Stop Motion written by Mark Shultz.
- Iris West appears in the Injustice: Gods Among Us prequel comic.
