= List of Flash enemies =

t This article list all the known enemies of the Flash, a fictional character.

== Golden Age ==
The Golden Age Flash enemies were all villains of the first Flash, Jay Garrick, later portrayed as living on Earth-Two after the introduction of the Silver Age Flash.

In chronological order (with issue and date of first appearance):

Villain	First appearance	Description
Shade	Flash Comics #33 (September 1942)	A villain who makes use of a special cane that enables him to cast complete darkness at will. Reformed in the 1990s Starman (vol. 2) series.
Rag Doll	Flash Comics #36 (December 1942)	Peter Merkel was born "triple-jointed", which enable him to flex farther than a normal human. His son, Peter Merkel Jr., possesses similar abilities and is a member of the Secret Six.
Eel	Comic Cavalcade #3 (June 1943)	"Eel" Madden was a criminal who had a grease gun, which made it almost impossible for anyone to catch him.
Thinker	All-Flash #12 (September 1943)	Clifford DeVoe, a former DA, was a villain who used a specially designed "thinking cap" as an aid in conjuring up and performing various crimes, and a founding member of the Injustice Society of the World, in which position he captured the Flash. He later became friends with the Flash before dying from cancer; however, his Thinking Cap technology had become a computer program that became an independent villain.
Turtle	All-Flash #21 (January/February 1946)	A villain who used slowness-related weapons against the Flash. He later resurfaced, gaining the ability to take away speed from people. In post-Flashpoint continuity, Turtle is a conduit of the Still Force and is able to nullify any form of motion.
Dmane	Flash Comics Miniature Edition (April 1946)	A criminal from the 70th century who is accidentally sent to 1946 by a time travel experiment. The Flash is finally able to send him back just before his execution.
Changeling	Flash Comics #84 (June 1947)	Nothing is known of the life of Erik Razar before he became a small-time gangster in Keystone City. In the early 1940s, Razar ran a small mob that was taken over by gangster Topper Hull. Hull framed Razar and had sent him to prison. In the summer of 1947, Razar hatched a plan to escape by sabotaging the prison power generator. His plan had an unforeseen side effect, charging Razar with enormous amounts of electricity and giving him the ability to transform into animals.
Rose and Thorn	Flash Comics #89 (November 1947)	Rose Canton had an alternate personality, Thorn, who was a villain and used thorn-themed weapons. She married Alan Scott, the first Green Lantern, had two children named Jade and Obsidian, and later committed suicide. Her suicide was undone by Flashpoint and she is now depicted as a schoolgirl.
Fiddler	All-Flash #32 (January 1948)	Isaac Bowin was a villain who used a violin to perform crimes, usually by using the violin to hypnotize people or cause vibrations which could shatter objects after learning skills from a fakir he was in prison with, before murdering him. He first tried to frame his brother, but was defeated and pretended to commit suicide. Fiddler later joined the Secret Six, but when he failed a mission, he was killed by Deadshot on the orders of their leader, Mockingbird. After his death, a woman found his violin and is now using it, calling herself Virtuoso.
Star Sapphire	All-Flash #32 (January 1948)	A queen of the Seventh Dimension, she tried to take over the Earth twice but failed. She is now trapped in the Gem.
The Rival	Flash Comics #104 (February 1949)	Dr. Edward Clariss, a professor at the university attended by Jay Garrick, believed he had recreated the formula that gave Garrick his speed which he called "Velocity 9". However, this formula was only temporary and he was defeated despite trying to use different fumes to take away the Flash's speed. Later, he escaped from jail, but went into the Speed Force itself. He is now pure energy from the Speed Force.

== Silver Age ==
The Silver Age Flash enemies all lived on Earth-One and started out as enemies of the second Flash, Barry Allen, as well as the third Flash, Wally West, and the fourth, Bart Allen, after the death of Barry Allen. The Silver Age is when some enemies started to use the name "Rogues". Originally, the Rogues were just a few of the Flash's enemies teaming together, but since then they have formed a lasting team, and usually a Rogue will not commit a crime by himself. The original eight Rogues were Captain Cold, the Mirror Master, Heat Wave, the Weather Wizard, the Trickster, the Pied Piper, the Top, and Captain Boomerang. The current incarnation of the Rogues includes Captain Cold, the Weather Wizard, Heat Wave, the third Mirror Master, and the second Trickster.

In chronological order (with issue and date of first appearance):

Villain	First appearance	Description
Mazdan	Showcase #4 (October 1956)	A criminal from the 38th century, who the authorities decide to exile to the 50th century when Earth is desolate. He is accidentally sent to the 20th century and tries to steal equipment needed to repair his time capsule, such as gold to coat it, and get back to the future to exact revenge, using advanced heat-based weapons. The Flash discovers this and captures Mazdan, who escapes using a contact lens that fires lasers and a "magnetic rod" that focuses heat; the Flash discovers that if Mazdan escapes using his time capsule, it will destroy everything within a radius of at least 10 miles, killing thousands. He uses his super-speed to break through the time barrier with Mazdan, who survives and returns to the 38th century.
Captain Cold	Showcase #8 (June 1957)	Leonard "Len" Snart was a criminal who wanted a chance to get rid of the Flash. Seeing an article about a weapon that might disrupt the Flash's speed, Snart made a gun and exposed it to radiations. However, due to the fact Snart was not experienced in the use of the device and activated it incorrectly, instead of slowing the Flash down, the gun could freeze anything to absolute zero, which he discovered when he accidentally used it on a watchman. Calling himself Captain Cold, Snart started out on a criminal career. He is the leader of the Rogues. Known for being a sympathetic villain, Cold has a sense of honor. Cold has strict rules on how the Rogues should act, such as no drugs and not to kill unless they have to. He also has a sense of loyalty to his team and watches out for them.
Doctor Alchemy	Showcase #14 (June 1958)	Albert Desmond suffered from a split personality, one a good person and the other evil. Originally calling himself Mr. Element and using element-themed devices before being captured by the Flash, he changed it to Dr. Alchemy when he found the Philosopher's Stone, which could transmute elements after hearing of it from a cellmate, and was able to transmute elements, although the effects only lasted for about 20 minutes. Soon it was found out that there were two Desmonds, Albert, the good one and Alvin, the bad, and that they shared a mental link. Alvin was destroyed, but Albert became Dr. Alchemy again.
Mirror Master	The Flash #105 (March 1959)	While working in a prison workshop, Samuel Scudder accidentally stumbled upon a mirror that could project holograms. When he escaped, he made more mirror gadgets, and became the Mirror Master. He has created many different mirrors that can do various things like travel into other dimensions. He was killed during Crisis on Infinite Earths; however, there have been two others who assumed his identity.
Gorilla Grodd	The Flash #106 (May 1959)	Grodd was an inhabitant of Gorilla City, a peaceful society of super-intelligent gorillas of which Grodd was the only evil one. A mastermind in his early years with vast mental powers, he has become more savage and stronger recently, to the point where he wants to "feast on the bones" of the Flash.
Pied Piper	The Flash #106 (May 1959)	Hartley Rathaway was born deaf, but was cured after his parents sought a way to make him hear. Once he could hear, he became obsessed with music and sound, and made many sound-based weapons. Originally a criminal, he reformed and came out as being gay the same time. He became a friend of Wally West, even when the Top revealed he had changed the personality of some of the Rogues (the Pied Piper included) to make them reform; the Pied Piper was able to fight off the Top and stay good.
Weather Wizard	The Flash #110 (December 1959/January 1960)	Mark Mardon escaped from prison to his brother's house. His brother had just made a wand that could control the weather. Mark wanted the weapon and he and his brother got into a fight, and his brother was killed (although Mardon said he was dead when he got there, he has since told the truth to Captain Cold).
Trickster	The Flash #113 (June/July 1960)	James Montgomery Jesse, a circus performer who came from a family of trapeze artists, invented shoes that used compressed air to "walk" on air, originally using them for tightrope walking. Inspired by Jesse James, James made other weapons and became the Trickster, robbing planes until Flash tracked him down in the circus. He was captured, but became a member of the Rogues. Once reformed, but it was revealed that was because the Top made it so, and he returned to the Rogues, but contemplated whether to be a hero or a villain.
Captain Boomerang	The Flash #117 (December 1960)	George "Digger" Harkness was a master of boomerangs, which he learned how to use in the Outback. When a mascot was needed for a boomerang company, Harkness was hired, but used the costume and boomerangs to commit crimes and he had many trick boomerangs. Originally, he pretended someone else was using his identity to trick the Flash, but finally the deception was revealed.
Top	The Flash #122 (August 1961)	Roscoe Dillon used many top-themed weapons to commit crimes, eventually learning how to spin himself at great speeds, increasing his intelligence and allowing him to deflect bullets. Although he died, Dillon's mind was so powerful that it took over the minds of many people to keep on living. He was killed again by Captain Cold when Dillon tried to take over the Rogues during the Rogue War. During this time, it was revealed that Dillon had made some of the Rogues reform, and during the war, he made them criminals again. He was also a victim of the JLA mindwipes; he was made a good person, but overpowered the mindwipe and again became a villain.
Abra Kadabra	The Flash #128 (May 1962)	A magician from the 64th century named Citizen Abra who was exiled from his time period and sent to the 20th century for his crimes. He used his technology to pose as a magician. Originally separate from the Rogues, he recently began joining forces with them occasionally.
Professor Zoom the Reverse-Flash	The Flash #139 (September 1963)	Eobard Thawne is a speedster from the 25th century, who occasionally used the alias Adrian Zoom. He was a fan of the Flash and gained his powers, but went insane on discovering he would become a villain. Once just a simple villain, he became more well known when he killed Barry Allen's wife Iris Allen (although her consciousness was transported to the 30th century at the last possible instant). This action made him Barry Allen's arch-nemesis. Later, when Barry was about to marry Fiona Webb, Thawne tried to kill her but, in a fit of rage, Barry killed him by breaking his neck, thus putting the Flash on trial for murder, where he was found guilty. He was returned to life and was the one behind Flashpoint.
Heat Wave	The Flash #140 (November 1963)	Mick Rory is obsessed with heat, and at a young age, burned down his house, killing his family. He then made a heat gun and used fire to rob and kill. Rory was one of the Rogues the Top made reform, and when that was taken away, Rory became a Rogue again. Even during his reformed life, his mind was already starting to turn to crime.
Golden Glider	The Flash #250 (June 1977)	Lisa Snart, the younger sister of Len Snart (Captain Cold), did not want to be a villain, but when her lover, the Top died, she swore revenge on the Flash. Using sharp ice skates which made ice, she battled the Flash, and got the approval of her brother. She was killed by Chillblaine, a villain whom she gave ice powers to. Captain Cold has since gotten revenge for her death by killing Chillblaine.
Clive Yorkin	The Flash #270 (February 1979)	Clive Yorkin, a criminal spending life in prison, agreed to take part in a prison experiment. The experiment went wrong and it drove him mad and able to kill someone by touching them. It was thought he killed Iris West, but he was innocent. The real culprit being Professor Zoom the Reverse-Flash.
Rainbow Raider	The Flash #286 (June 1980)	A colorblind painter, Roy G. Bivolo had true talent in composition and detail, but his lack of ability to see color made his work unpopular. His father made a pair of goggles for him that could project colors on a person; each color represented a different emotional mood. Roy became a criminal who stole paintings and joined the Rogues. He was later killed by Blacksmith.

== Modern Age ==
In addition to the Silver Age Rogues, there have been many other Flash villains created in the past few years. The special issue Flash: Iron Heights was the first appearance of many of them. Some of the "new breed", as the original Rogues call them, made a team called the New Rogues, led by Blacksmith. They tried to take away the allies of the Flash so he would fight them alone, but the Flash beat them anyway. These villains are not part of the current Rogues, which are still the Silver Age villains. Also, new versions of the Mirror Master, the Trickster, and Captain Boomerang were introduced and did become members of the Rogues.

Villain	First appearance	Description
Magenta	The New Teen Titans #17 (March 1982)	Frances Kane was a one-time girlfriend of Wally West, who gained magnetic powers which killed her family. Not knowing her purpose in life, she became a villain and first joined the Cicada cult and the New Rogues before reforming.
Mirror Master	Animal Man #8 (February 1989)	Evan McCulloch grew up in an orphanage, and after killing a bully, he escaped and became a mercenary. On one hit, he unknowingly shot and killed his father, and later found out his mother had died of grief. Then, he was hired by the government to be the third Mirror Master, and he got the original Mirror Master's costume and equipment. Instead of working for the government, McCulloch became a member of the Rogues, taking the place of the original Mirror Master. He also has a drug problem, of which Captain Cold does not approve.
Manfred Mota	Flash 50th Anniversary Special (1990)	Manfred Mota is a villain who has multiple versions of the Flash, each time in a different form. He is also the father of Valerie Perez, girlfriend of Bart Allen. Also known as "Atom Smasher", "Professor Fallout", and "Fusionn".
Chillblaine	The Flash Annual (vol. 2) #5 (August 1992)	Chillblaine is the name used by a series of super-villains who have been boyfriends to Golden Glider. She recruits them as her crime partners using cold gun technology designed by her brother Captain Cold. Because of this they are usually strong and handsome but not very smart. The original Chillblaine was killed when Glider became possessed by Eclipso. The second and third Chillblaines had very brief careers before they were abandoned as lovers. The fourth Chillblaine was the last to use the title as he killed Glider and stole her technology. Eventually Captain Cold murdered him in revenge.
Razer	Flash (vol. 2) #84 (November 1993)	Razer is a villain who was a mercenary for hire who wears a suit coated completely with lubrilon, an experimental near-frictionless chemical polymer. He nearly destroyed a mall, though the Flash got almost everyone out. Razer later escaped and began working for Data Highways, Inc.
Inertia	Impulse #50 (July 1999)	Inertia is a clone of Bart Allen. He originally fought Bart when he was Impulse, and then when Bart aged five years after Infinite Crisis and became the Flash, Inertia fought him again. Inertia was responsible for the death of Allen, and when Wally West returned, he took revenge by stripping Inertia of all movement and putting him in the Flash Museum. During Final Crisis: Rogues' Revenge, he was used by Libra and Zoom to try to get the Rogues to join the new Secret Society of Super Villains. He stole Zoom's powers, called himself Kid Zoom, and was killed by the Rogues, who blamed him for making them kill Bart.
Folded Man	The Flash (vol. 2) #153 (October 1999)	Edwin Gauss is a criminal who uses a suit to shift from 3D space to 2D and 4-D space. He created Avernus, a graveyard in 4-D space for fallen Flash enemies.
Plunder	The Flash (vol. 2) #165 (October 2000)	Jared Morillo is an assassin from a mirror universe, a copy of a police officer of the same name in the comic's main timeline. Plunder later joined Blacksmith's Rogues and began working with them in their plan to eliminate the Flash's allies, but was later sent back to his reality by Hunter Zolomon.
Brother Grimm	The Flash (vol. 2) #166 (November 2000)	The ruler of another realm, Brother Grimm blames Wally West for driving him to kill his brother and assume the throne. He possesses powerful magical abilities and is able to "sense" the Speed Force, thus forcing Wally to limit himself to normal speed in any fight with him.
Cicada	The Flash (vol. 2) #171 (April 2001)	During a thunderstorm sometime in the early 20th century, David Hersch murdered his wife. Regretting what he had done, he sought to end his own life, only to be struck by lightning. He had a vision that he had been chosen to live forever, and he would bring his wife back as well. Starting a cult, his followers killed people who had been saved by the Flash, and Cicada used the energy of these people to live forever.
Tar Pit	The Flash (vol. 2) #174 (July 2001)	Joey Monteleone was the brother of a drug dealer, and while in prison discovered he could put his mind into inanimate objects. However, his mind got stuck inside a mass of tar.
Murmur	The Flash: Iron Heights (2001)	A surgeon who went insane, Michael Amar now seeks sadistic ways to kill the voices he hears in his head. His distinctive criminal act is to remove a victim's tongue early during the torture he inflicts. He also has a virus called Frenzy that will turn a person's lungs to mud in 90 minutes.
Blacksmith	The Flash: Iron Heights (2001)	Blacksmith is a Ferro-kinetic crime lord who was once married to Goldface. She founded her own rendition of the Rogues, and created the Network, an underground hideaway for the Rogues that had been in operation for years without anyone knowing about it. However, she and her Rogues were defeated by Wally West.
Fallout	The Flash: Iron Heights (2001)	Neil Borman was a stonemason who was hired to do some additional work on a nuclear power plant he and his team had helped construct. During a series of tests an explosion destroyed the floor that Borman and his workmates were working on, and they fell into the reactor's cooling system. His co-workers died, but Borman survived as his body's molecular structure shifted, transforming into a man composed of high-energy electrons. Unfortunately, Borman had brought his wife and son to work to show them around the plant. Contact with his new body killed them, and in the same way he inadvertently killed several people. Genuinely remorseful, he was imprisoned in Iron Heights Penitentiary, where he was used to power the prison with his new abilities.
Girder	The Flash: Iron Heights (2001)	Tony Woodward was shoved into a vat of molten steel from S.T.A.R. Labs during a riot after he assaulted a female coworker. He survived, but became composed of scrap metal. He joined the New Rogues and took part in the Rogue War.
Double Down	The Flash: Iron Heights (2001)	Jeremy Tell lost a card game and then killed the man who won. After this, the cards in the dead man's pocket flew out and covered Tell, becoming his skin. He can use the razor-sharp corners of the cards as weapons by peeling them off of himself.
Zoom	(as Hunter Zolomon); The Flash Secret Files and Origins #3 (November 2001) (as Zoom); The Flash (vol. 2) #197 (June 2003)	Hunter Zolomon was once a friend of the Flash who worked at the police station. When visiting Iron Heights Penitentiary, he was caught in an escape attempt by Gorilla Grodd, who broke Zolomon's back. He survived and asked for the Flash to go back in time and stop it from happening. The Flash told him that he cannot change history, even for a friend. Zolomon got very mad at the Flash, and decided to try to do it himself. However, the Cosmic Treadmill exploded during the process, and Zolomon gained superhuman speed not coming from the Speed Force, but from time itself, making him even faster than the Flash. Zolomon set out to make the Flash a better hero by letting him deal with loss, and killed his unborn twins. This event has since been rectified due to time travel.
Peek-a-Boo	The Flash (vol. 2) #180 (January 2002)	Lashawn Baez has the power to teleport, and used the power to try to steal a liver for her father who needed a new one. She was stopped by the Flash and her father died. She is now a villain.
Trickster	The Flash (vol. 2) #184 (April 2002)	After the original Trickster reformed, teenager Axel Walker found his equipment and stole it, becoming the new Trickster. He joined the Rogues, and took the place of the first Trickster (even though most of the Rogues thought of him as too young and impulsive). During the Rogue War, James Jesse, the original Trickster, became a Rogue again and took back what was his. After Jesse was killed by Deadshot in Countdown to Final Crisis, Walker rejoined the Rogues as the Trickster in the Final Crisis: Rogues' Revenge miniseries.
Captain Boomerang	Identity Crisis #3 (October 2004)	Owen Mercer is the son of the original Captain Boomerang and Meloni Thawne (making him Bart Allen's maternal half-brother). He did not know his father until he was an adult. The two practiced together, and Owen found he had bursts of super-speed. When his father died he joined the Rogues, but One Year Later he reformed and is now a member of the Suicide Squad.

== One Year Later ==
Villain	First appearance	Description
Griffin	The Flash: Fastest Man Alive #1 (August 2006)	Griffin Grey was a friend of Bart Allen until he was caught in an explosion at work; he found out he had enhanced speed and strength, and he became a hero, but only for the glory of it. However, the powers made him age faster, and he looked like an old man in days. He tried to find the secret of what kept Jay Garrick young, but could not. He then became a villain, and during a fight with Bart, he was overpowered and died.
Spin	The Flash (vol. 2) #238 (May 2008)	A mysterious villain with the ability to magnify fears and make them reality. Spin is actually Dantley Walker, a person in authority either at KN News or its parent company. Spin's secret headquarters, located below the television station's office, conceals an emaciated captive telepath, plugged into machines and used to track public anxiety so that he can more reliably manipulate it.

== The New 52 ==
Villain	First appearance	Description
Mob Rule	The Flash #1 (August 2011)	A group consisting of dozens of duplicates of Barry Allen's old friend Manuel Lago. Mob Rule first came into existence when Lago was tortured by a criminal organization called Basilisk. They cut off his fingers one by one and discovered that because of a CIA experiment, he could regrow lost limbs and each severed limb could grow into a duplicate of Manuel. Initially, the duplicates worked with Manuel in his "one-man" crusade against Basilisk. When they began to die for no reason in the same order in which they were "born", their new mission became to find a doctor who can find a cure so they could continue to live.
Turbine	The Flash #8 (August 2011)	Roscoe Hynes, also known as Turbine, is a former Tuskegee airman who led a fleet of prototype war planes on its first combat mission during World War II. However, when he broke formation to test the plane's capabilities, he and his plane completely disappeared inexplicably. Roscoe Hynes and the plane ended up being trapped in the Speed Force and now, for the past 70 years, he has been trapped within the Speed Force. However, now with the recent arrival of the Flash, who is in search of his friend Iris West, Roscoe Hynes has found his way home.
Elsa Mardon	The Flash #9 (July 2012)	Elsa was married to Marco Mardon's brother Claudio who was also a criminal in Central City. She was killed by lightning by Marco Mardon when she revealed to him that she killed his brother Claudio.
Reverse Flash	The Flash #0 (November 2012)	Daniel West is the brother of Iris West. His mom died while giving birth to him and his dad, an alcoholic, blamed Danny for his mother's death. One day, Danny's father killed the crickets Danny had been collecting and he was so mad he pushed his father down a flight of stairs. This crippled Danny's father and Danny ran away from home in anger and fear, leaving his sister Iris to live alone with their abusive dad. Fast forward about 15 years and Danny is trying to rebuild his relationship with Iris. Iris, however, is not interested, as she is still mad at him for leaving her. Danny is upset by this and blames his dad for his lack of a relationship with his sister, the only person he has ever loved and the only friend he has ever had. Later that day Danny, who is struggling financially, decides to turn to crime, but is stopped by the Flash on his first robbery. He is later released from prison, only to be kidnapped by the Rogues. He attempts to escape, but ends up crashing a car into a Speed Force battery, which gives him superhuman speed and the ability to drain the Speed Force from anyone he touches.
Spitfire	The Flash #26 (February 2014)	Spitfire pulls heists on high-value targets and tries to do them in impossible ways.
Black Mold	The Flash #31 (June 2014)	Black Mold uses mold spores to kill people.
Lummox	The Flash #41 (August 2015)	Lummox is a thief who uses a mechanical super suit during his jobs.
Folded Man (Xolani)	The Flash Annual #4 (September 2015)	Xolani was a low class thief who operated in the Southern part of Africa in the year 1883 until he was time-traveled to the present to oppose the Flash.

== DC Rebirth ==
Villain	First appearance	Description
Godspeed	The Flash Vol. 5 #1 (2016)	August Heart's brother got shot by criminals. August Heart soon got super-speed and killed thugs. The Flash beat him in a fight. Godspeed is currently imprisoned in Iron Heights.
Papercut	The Flash Vol. 5 #5 (August 2016)	Benedict Booker is a metahuman criminal who can manipulate wood.
Sand Blaster	The Flash Vol. 5 #14 (March 2017)	Sand Blaster is a metahuman criminal who can conjure and shoot sand from his hands.
Bone Dry	The Flash Vol. 5 #14 (March 2017)	Bone Dry is a metahuman criminal who can absorb the moisture out of anyone's body. He has worked with Papercut and Sand Blaster in the past.
Bloodwork	The Flash Vol. 5 #28 (August 2016)	Dr. Ramsey Rosso is a hemophiliac and self-made metahuman with the ability to control blood and transform his body.
Gemini	The Flash Vol. 5 #58 (January 2019)	Santino and Belladonna are two lovers who obtained power-absorbing gauntlets.
Psych	The Flash Vol. 5 #61 (March 2019)	A conduit of the Sage Force with telekinesis and telepathy.

== Enemies created for Hostess ==
In the 1970s and 1980s, Hostess Brands ran advertisements for their products in DC and Marvel comics. These advertisements were a one-page comic featuring a DC hero and a villain. The Flash appeared in four Hostess advertisements, each with an original villain.

Villain	First appearance	Description
The Bureauc-Rat	Flash Meets the Bureauc-Rat	The Bureauc-Rat was a traffic official in Central City until budget cuts meant his job was gone. He created a "red-tape" ray gun to slow everything in the city down. He was eventually stopped by The Flash when he used Hostess Pies to distract the Bureauc-Rat.
The Destroyer	A Flash in the Dam	The Destroyer wanted to make everyone depressed like him, so he plotted to destroy the Doover Dam. The Flash repaired the dam and proved to the Destroyer that there is happiness in life inside a Hostess Twinkies cake.
Dr. Sorcery	Marathon Madman	Dr. Sorcery attacked the Central City Police Marathon using the Philosopher's Stone. He destroyed a bridge that was part of the marathon in order to make it more challenging. The Flash stopped Dr. Sorcery by distracting him with Hostess Cup Cakes.
Medusa	The Stony-Eyed Medusa	Medusa had the power to turn anyone she stared at into stone and used this to threaten a Central City parade. The Flash stopped her by distracting her with Hostess Fruit Pies and tying her up.

== Enemies created for other media ==
The Flash villains "created" in other media, with no appearances in previous or subsequent comics. Those sharing the names of comic villains, but bearing no other similarities, are noted:

Villain	Media	Actor/Actress
Prank	The Flash (1990)	Corinne Bohrer
"Deadly" Nightshade	The Flash (1990)	Richard Burgi
The Trachmann	The Flash (1990)	Charley Haywood
The Ghost	The Flash (1990)	Anthony Starke
Nicholas Pike	The Flash (1990)	Michael Nader
Matthew Norvok	The Flash (2014)	Mark Sweatman
Ultraviolet	The Flash (2014)	Alexa Barajas
Sunshine	The Flash (2014)	Natalie Sharp

== See also ==
- Rogues
- List of Superman enemies
- List of Batman family enemies
- List of Wonder Woman enemies
- List of Green Lantern enemies
- List of Aquaman enemies
