= Top (character) =

The Top
- The Top as depicted in The Flash #219 (December 1972). Art by Irv Novick (pencils) and Joe Giella (inks).

Publication information
- Publisher: DC Comics
- First appearance: The Flash #122 (August 1961)
- Created by: John Broome; Carmine Infantino

In-story information
- Alter ego: Roscoe Neyle Dillon
- Species: Metahuman
- Team affiliations: Rogues; Black Lantern Corps; Legion of Zoom
- Notable aliases: Thomas O'Neill
- Abilities: Increased intelligence; Mental powers; Use of gimmicked tops; Ability to spin at incredible speeds and induce vertigo in others

The Top (Roscoe Neyle Dillon) is a supervillain appearing in American comic books published by DC Comics.

The character has made limited appearances across DC-related media while a female version appeared in the live-action television series The Flash, portrayed by Ashley Rickards.

== Publication history ==
Top first appeared in The Flash #122 (August 1961) and was created by John Broome and Carmine Infantino.

== Fictional character biography ==
Roscoe Dillon is a small-time crook who turns his childhood obsession with tops into a criminal persona. Roscoe taught himself how to spin around fast enough to deflect bullets and produce other semi-useful effects. Top soon discovers that the spinning increased his intelligence as well (because his body and thus his mind are spinning at super human speeds), allowing him to create a variety of trick tops. He tried to blackmail the world with an atomic top that would destroy half the world when it slowed down and imprisoned the Flash inside it, but the Flash vibrated out of it and sent it into space. His unique gimmick and moderate success in crime soon makes him a respected member of the Flash's Rogues Gallery. He dates Golden Glider, Captain Cold's sister, while coaching her on ice skating. Eventually, Top develops immense psionic powers, as years of spinning moves dormant brain cells to the outer areas of his brain, endowing him with mental powers.

However, the newly activated brain cells are destroyed by close proximity to the Flash's superspeed vibrations. Top dies within days from the injuries sustained by his brain, but not before he plants a series of powerful bombs to destroy Central City as a final revenge. In addition, he prepared a recording explaining his terminal condition and scheme to spitefully challenge his comrades to attempt to find and defuse the explosives which must be done by gathering them all by committing the same crimes he did and then stacking them on top of each other, knowing that the Flash would surely stop at least one of the attempts and doom the city. Certain that the superhero would never believe them if they tried to warn him of the crisis, the Rogues desperately attempt to find the bombs despite the Flash's unwitting opposition. Fortunately, the Flash eventually realizes the situation and aids in stopping the scheme in time.

When Barry Allen's parents were in a car accident, Dillon's spirit is somehow able to take possession of the vacant body of his father, Henry. Realizing who Barry Allen is, he, along with Golden Glider, plot to kill the Flash and take over his body. He fails when he tries to take over the Flash's body while Flash is alive, leaving Henry's spirit to repossess his body.

=== Brainwashing ===
About a week after, Roscoe Dillon takes possession of another comatose body and begins wreaking havoc on anyone Barry Allen knew. The final straw comes when he digs up the grave of Iris West. After knocking him out, Barry takes Dillon to the Justice League Watchtower and asks Zatanna to alter his mind to make him a hero. It works at first, but Dillon is soon driven insane with guilt for all the trouble he has caused. His villainous nature comes into conflict with the spell Zatanna put on him, driving him mad. During that time, he uses his mental powers to "fix" the other rogues by implementing mental programs to make them reform. Some of them reject the programming altogether, such as Captain Cold, Weather Wizard, and Captain Boomerang, while others, including Pied Piper, Heat Wave, and the original Trickster, either seem to remain under the programming or truly reform, at least until Dillon reveals his reprogramming.

Dillon apparently returns to his villainous ways after inhabiting the body of Thomas O'Neill, a vice-presidential nominee. He plans to become president by setting Piper up to assassinate his running mate after they win, but is stopped by the new Flash, Wally West. Dillon is imprisoned after this, causing him to become more disoriented and insane than before. His powers evolve to being able to induce vertigo in others.

During the events of Identity Crisis, Wally receives a note from Barry about what he did to Top's mind and asks Wally to restore Top's mind back to its original state. With Zatanna, he manages to find Top behind an old toy factory and repair his mind. Now sane, Top tells them about his "fixing" of the Rogues and swears to remove their mental programming and return them back to their villainous ways.

While Captain Cold and his Rogues are warring against Trickster and the reformed Rogues, Top forms his own group of Rogues, having altered their brains. After removing Heat Wave's programming, he declares himself the new leader of the Rogues and has his group of reprogrammed Rogues attack Flash. Captain Cold flash-freezes Top and shatters his body in retaliation.

In Blackest Night, Top is resurrected as a Black Lantern.

=== The New 52 ===
In The New 52 (a 2011 reboot of the DC Comics universe), a version of Top exists under the name of Turbine. Roscoe Hynes was a Tuskegee Airman who led a squadron of prototype planes on its first combat mission during World War II. During the battle Hynes breaks formation to test the prototype plane's flight capabilities, and disappears into thin air. It is later revealed that Hynes was absorbed into the Speed Force dimension and trapped there for about seventy years. Driven insane due to isolation, he tried desperately to escape using his newfound ability to control the wind, but this only served to create massive wormholes that pulled people and objects (including an entire ship) into the Speed Force. The Flash, trying to save the ship's passengers, enters the Force. Turbine confronts him, and their battle ends with both being sent back to Earth. An amnesic Hynes later reappears in Central City; he recovers his memories upon hearing The Flash being mentioned and promises to tell Patty Spivot (who believes Barry Allen is dead) where Barry is. Hynes is later killed by Captain Cold while imprisoned in Iron Heights.

A separate character named Roscoe Dillon appears later in The New 52 as one of the "Acolytes of Zoom". This version also has the ability to control centrifugal force, having created a tornado in his hometown prior to being found by Zoom.

== Powers and abilities ==
Top is able to spin at incredible speeds. The spinning also gave him increased intelligence, as his brain was also moving at incredible speeds. The Top's spinning eventually gives him powerful telekinetic and telepathic powers due to the stimulation of his brain cells. Since his soul returned from Hell, he has developed a new mental ability that allows him to induce severe disorientation and vertigo in his victims. Top also uses spinning tops with gimmicks to them such as glue, explosives, oil and gases. He once built a massive "atomic grenade top" that could have destroyed half of the world.

== Other versions ==
An unidentified, heroic, future incarnation of the Top from the 25th century appears in The Flash (vol. 3). This version is a police officer and member of the Renegades whose abilities are derived from a suit. Due to the organization refusing to admit members whose relatives have committed crimes, the Top works to prevent Barry Allen from indirectly sending his ancestor to jail and protect his place on the Renegades, only to be defeated by him and arrested by his former comrades.

== In other media ==
=== Television ===
- The Top makes cameo appearances in Justice League Unlimited as a member of Gorilla Grodd's Secret Society.
- The Top makes minor non-speaking appearances in Batman: The Brave and the Bold.
- A female version of the Top named Rosalind "Rosa" Dillon appears in The Flash, portrayed by Ashley Rickards. This version is in a romantic relationship with Sam Scudder, whom she aided in multiple heists until they were betrayed by Leonard Snart three years prior. Shortly after, Scudder and Dillon were exposed to dark matter released by S.T.A.R. Labs' particle accelerator, with the resulting shockwave trapping Scudder inside a mirror and turning Dillon into a metahuman who can induce vertigo via eye contact. Scudder later escapes in the present and breaks Dillon out of Iron Heights Penitentiary, after which they go on to fight the Flash and Jesse Quick and join Black Hole before Scudder is killed by Mirror Monarch and Dillon is arrested.

=== Film ===
The Top appears in Justice League: The Flashpoint Paradox, voiced by an uncredited Dee Bradley Baker. This version is a member of the Rogues.

=== Video games ===
- The Top appears in DC Universe Online, voiced by Robert S. Fisher.
- The Top appears as a character summon in Scribblenauts Unmasked: A DC Comics Adventure.

=== Miscellaneous ===
The Top appears in The Flash: The Fastest Man Alive #3.
