= Pied Piper (DC Comics) =

Hartley Rathaway Pied Piper
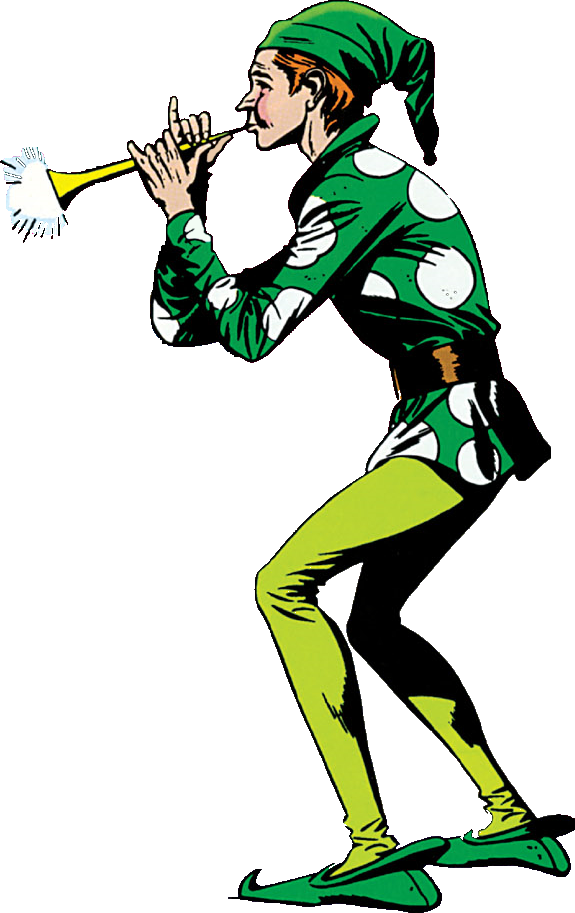
- Pied Piper as depicted on the cover of The Flash #106 (May 1959). Art by Carmine Infantino (penciller) and Joe Giella (inker).

Publication information
- Publisher: DC Comics
- First appearance: The Flash #106 (May 1959)
- Created by: John Broome (writer); Carmine Infantino (artist)

In-story information
- Alter ego: Hartley Rathaway
- Species: Human
- Place of origin: New Earth
- Team affiliations: Rogues
- Notable aliases: Thomas Peterson, Henry Darrow
- Abilities: Genius-level intellect; Enhanced hearing; Sound manipulation; Master musician; Utilizes hypnotic flute

Pied Piper (Hartley Rathaway) is a supervillain turned superhero appearing in American comic books published by DC Comics, and is commonly associated with the superhero the Flash. The character was created by writer John Broome and artist Carmine Infantino, and made his first appearance in The Flash #106 (May 1959).

Piper was originally introduced as a foe of the Flash / Barry Allen and eventually became a member of the Rogues, a criminal association led by Captain Cold which often battled the Flash. During the crossover event Crisis on Infinite Earths, most of the Multiverse was destroyed, which resulted in the DC Universe being rebooted; moreover Barry died, and Wally West took up the mantle of the Flash. Following the events of Crisis, Piper was re-introduced in The Flash (vol. 2) #20 (December 1988) as having reformed and become a champion for the poor. Soon afterward, he became an ally and personal friend of Wally, and an integral member of the Flash family.

Following the events of Flashpoint, DC Comics rebooted its universe once again and relaunched its titles in 2011, during The New 52 event. Here, Piper is portrayed as a former member of the Rogues, who has given up being a vigilante and is dating David Singh, Barry's Director at the Central City Police Department. Although an ally of Barry, Piper was unaware of his double life as the Flash and has a smaller role. Following Infinite Frontier, Wally again became the main Flash—Barry's role being diminished—and Piper was once-more depicted as aware of his friend's secret identity and member of the Flash family.

The Pied Piper appeared in the first, second, sixth and ninth seasons of The Flash, portrayed by Andy Mientus.

== Publication history ==
Created by John Broome and Carmine Infantino, the character made his first appearance in The Flash #106 (May 1959).

Following the events of Crisis, Piper was revealed to be gay in The Flash (vol. 2) #53 (August 1991).

== Fictional character biography ==
Hartley Rathaway was born deaf and received assistive technology in the form of hearing implants thanks to research funded by his wealthy father (later it was revealed that the implants were made by Dr. Will Magnus). He became obsessed with sound, and pursued little else in life; experimenting with sonic technology, Rathaway eventually invented a technique of hypnotism through music, and a way to cause deadly vibrations. Growing bored with his lifestyle, he turned to crime as the Pied Piper and frequently clashed with Barry Allen, the second Flash.

=== Reform ===
Rathaway, as appeared in The Flash vol. 2, 190 (November 2002). Art by Scott Kolins.

After Allen's death during Crisis on Infinite Earths, Hartley retired from crime to become a socialist champion of the poor and underprivileged. He also came out as one of DC's first openly gay characters, and joked that this was ironic, as he was one of the few villains to have ever "gone straight". He first realized he was gay when he became attracted to Rod Lauren when watching The Crawling Hand. Rathaway becomes a good friend of the Flash, Wally West, and his wife Linda, whom he helps with scientific problems.

Sometime later, Piper was arrested for the murder of his parents. Wally was sure Piper could not have committed such an act, but Piper himself seemed to believe himself guilty. Wally eventually discovered that the true murderer was Mirror Master. Unaware of Wally's discovery, Piper broke out of Iron Heights and struck a deal of some sort with former Rogue and FBI agent James Jesse (Trickster). During this time, Flash asked the Spectre to erase everyone's memories of his secret identity, due to his wife suffering a miscarriage from an attack by Zoom.

It was later revealed that Barry Allen had Zatanna tamper with the mind of supervillain the Top, turning him into a hero (the Top had gone on a murderous rampage and Allen believed this was the only way to stop him from causing more harm). As a hero, the Top went insane over the guilt of his earlier deeds. After Allen had died, Wally received a letter from Barry asking him to restore Top's mind if he ever returned. After Wally had Zatanna restore the Top's mind, the Top revealed that when he had been a hero he had attempted to reprogram many of the other Rogues into heroes as well, including the Pied Piper.

When the 'good' Rogues went after the remaining 'bad', Top returned to undo his brainwashing on the redeemed Rogues. When the Piper battled the Flash, West unmasked himself, triggering a flood of memories of their friendship and causing the Piper to pass out as his mind repaired itself. When he awoke, Piper appeared to be his old self again and came to Linda's aid. Piper remains the only Rogue to no longer be a villain, save for Magenta. He later had all charges for murder cleared.

=== One Year Later ===
In Countdown to Final Crisis, Pied Piper and the original Trickster (James Jesse) go on the run after the other Rogues murder Bart Allen. After attending Bart's funeral in secret, Piper and Trickster are captured by Deadshot and Multiplex and handcuffed together with a chain and cuffs that will explode if tampered with. They manage to escape from their captors, but remain shackled together. The two are eventually tracked down by Deadshot, who kills Trickster. Pied Piper survives and escapes on the train. Unable to destroy the cuffs, Piper chops off Trickster's left hand. Pied Piper is later transported to Apokolips, where he is freed from Trickster's hand and destroys Apokolips in retaliation for Trickster's death. He escapes the destruction of Apokolips via a Boom Tube.

=== Final Crisis ===
Pied Piper returns in the Final Crisis: Rogues' Revenge mini-series. He invades the police precinct and retrieves Trickster's will, which is actually a fake that contains information on the other Rogues, written in invisible ink. Piper later steps into the middle of the fight between Inertia, Zoom, and the Rogues, using his flute to paralyze the combatants and attacking Mirror Master. However, Libra appears and stabs Piper in the shoulder with his spear. Although wounded, Piper helps the Rogues kill Inertia by paralyzing him with his flute. Piper is later mentioned to have turned himself into the Central City Police Department.

=== The New 52: The Flash and Forever Evil: Rogues Rebellion (2011–2016) ===
In September 2011, The New 52 rebooted DC's continuity. In this new timeline, Hartley Rathaway is now the conductor of Central City's orchestra, and it is said that he is a 'reformed vigilante'. He is in a relationship with David Singh, the director of the crime lab at the Central City Police Department.

== Powers and abilities ==
A genius of sonic technology, by the age of sixteen Rathaway had crafted a sophisticated flute capable of hypnotizing anyone within range of its sound. He can make anyone do what he wants, and can even make himself 'invisible' to the perception of others. Although he focused obsessively on sound-based technology in his early years, he later expanded his scope to more general mechanical tinkering. Initially, he employed his mind control techniques almost exclusively on humans (and occasional animals), but during his incarceration in Iron Heights he became infatuated by the prison's ubiquitous rats and incorporated them into his gimmick, adding another similarity to his namesake. He is able to use nearly anything that can create tones for his sonic manipulations, including touch-tone telephones and grass blade whistles. According to DeSaad, Rathaway's power is based on the manipulation of the Anti-Life Equation. Rathaway also employs a number of devices that can generate or amplify sound for destructive or protective purposes.

== Other versions ==
- An alternate universe version of the Pied Piper from Earth-S appears in Captain Marvel Jr. (1942) as an enemy of the eponymous character.
- An alternate timeline version of the Pied Piper appears in the Flashpoint tie-in Citizen Cold. This version is a hero and childhood friend of Wally West whose vocal cords were ripped out by the eponymous Citizen Cold, forcing the Pied Piper to take on a cybernetic replacement.
- An alternate universe version of Hartley Rathaway appears in the DCeased tie-in Hope at World's End. This version lives in an apartment with David Singh while battling the "Anti-Living".

== In other media ==
=== Television ===
- An original incarnation of the Pied Piper named Hamlin Rule appears in a self-titled episode of Wonder Woman, portrayed by Martin Mull. This version hypnotizes women to rob the venues at which he performs.
- The Pied Piper makes a non-speaking cameo appearance in the Justice League Unlimited episode "Flash and Substance".

Andy Mientus as Hartley Rathaway / Pied Piper in The Flash.

- The Pied Piper appears in The Flash, portrayed by Andy Mientus. This version is a former S.T.A.R. Labs employee and protégé of Harrison Wells before he was fired for attempting to expose the dangers of the latter's particle accelerator. When the accelerator exploded, Rathaway gained superhuman hearing that left him in constant agony. In retaliation, he developed sonic-wave weaponry to exact revenge on Wells by targeting his new protégé, the Flash, as well as implants for himself that serve both as hearing aids that dull sound and as discreet weapons. In the first season, Rathaway attempts to get revenge on Wells for ruining his reputation. Though he is captured, he later manages to escape. In the second season episode "Flash Back", the Flash travels back in time to defeat Zoom. Along the way, he prevents Rathaway's escape and joins forces with him to defeat a Time Wraith that followed the Flash through time. As a result of these timeline changes, Rathaway reforms. Due to changes made to the multiverse following the crossover "Crisis on Infinite Earths", Rathaway became a sonokinetic metahuman and returned to being a criminal and an enemy of the Flash, who discovers that in an altered version of one of their original fights, he accidentally destabilized Rathaway's henchman/boyfriend, Roderick's, molecules. Due to this, Rathaway grew to resent the Flash. After they reconcile and join forces to stop Godspeed, they are able to save Roderick. In the ninth season, Rathaway joins the Flash's Rogues to combat the Red Death.
- The Pied Piper makes a cameo appearance in The Sandman.
- The Pied Piper appears in Beast Boy: Lone Wolf.

=== Film ===
- The Pied Piper was reportedly featured in David S. Goyer's script for a Green Arrow film project titled Escape from Super Max as an inmate of the eponymous prison.
- The Flashpoint incarnation of the Pied Piper makes a non-speaking appearance in Justice League: The Flashpoint Paradox as a member of Cyborg's group who work to stop the war between Aquaman and Wonder Woman's forces.

=== Video games ===
The Pied Piper appears in DC Universe Online, voiced by Jim Canning.

=== Miscellaneous ===
- The Pied Piper appears in All-New Batman: The Brave and the Bold #16.
- The Pied Piper makes non-speaking appearances in DC Super Hero Girls as a student of Super Hero High.
- The Pied Piper appears in Injustice: Gods Among Us: Year Five #2.
- Hartley Rathaway / Pied Piper appears in Wonder Woman '77 Special #3
