= Final Crisis: Rogues' Revenge =

- Cover art for Final Crisis: Rogues' Revenge #2. Art by Scott Kolins.

Publication information
- Publisher: DC Comics
- Schedule: Monthly
- Format: Mini-series
- Genre: Superhero
- Publication date: September - November 2008
- No. of issues: 3
- Main character(s): The Rogues; Libra; Zoom; Inertia; The Pied Piper

Creative team
- Written by: Geoff Johns
- Artist: Scott Kolins
- Letterer: Nick Napolitano
- Colorist: Dave McCaig
- Editor(s): Joey Cavalieri; Chris Conroy

Collected editions
- Hardcover: ISBN 1-4012-2333-8
- Paperback: ISBN 1401223346

Final Crisis: Rogues' Revenge is a three-issue 2008 mini-series produced by DC Comics. The series is a tie-in to Final Crisis, and is written by Geoff Johns and penciled by Scott Kolins. This reunites the creative team for the first time since their run on The Flash (vol. 2) in 2001–2003.

== Plot ==
After escaping from Cygnus 4019 during the events of Salvation Run, Captain Cold, Mirror Master, Weather Wizard and Heat Wave return to Keystone City, only to find that it has been invaded by a gang led by the Trickster (Axel Walker). After driving the gang out, Cold declares that the Rogues will disband, having broken their rule against killing by killing Bart Allen. Meanwhile, as Jared Morillo and Ashley Zolomon investigate Bart's murder, they are attacked by the Pied Piper. Piper steals the will of the first Trickster, James Jesse, which contains information on the Rogues.

Meanwhile, Gregory Wolfe prepares to transfer a paralyzed Inertia to Iron Heights. However, Inertia escapes after Zoom restores who wants him to become the new Kid Flash. When they learn of Inertia's escape, the Rogues decide to break their number one rule one last time before retirement, and to kill Inertia in revenge.

The fight is then interrupted by Libra, who chastises Piper for his blasphemy in claiming he was a messenger from New Genesis and then gives Weather Wizard an ultimatum - join him or he will kill his son. Weather Wizard says that if he was capable of killing his own brother, there's no way he would not kill his son. Libra calls his bluff, but before this could be resolved Inertia kills the child and proclaims himself Kid Zoom. The Rogues and Piper rally and attack Inertia all at once, killing him. Libra then tells them that after killing two speedsters (Inertia and Bart), they are ready to take on the returned Barry Allen in the name of Darkseid. The Rogues are stunned to learn of Barry's return, but turn down Libra, saying they want no part in what is sure to be Libra's defeat; as they leave, Libra shouts at them that evil will win the fight.

Afterwards, Piper turns himself in to the police and the Rogues' deliver Inertia's corpse to the police with a note to the Flash that they were now even. Back at their hideout, Captain Cold scoffs at the idea of evil winning, stating he did not believe in true evil, merely different shades of gray. He then decides to put off retirement claiming that the game is back on because of Barry Allen, to which all the other Rogues agree.

== Reception ==
Dan Phillips of IGN praised the series, giving the issues a 7.9, 9.3, and 9.2 respectively. While originally calling the first issue somewhat of a "letdown", Phillips would call the series a "homerun" by the third issue.

Comic Book Resources gave the last issue three-and-half stars out of five, claiming the series "is a worthy successor to his [Geoff Johns] best "Flash" stories of yesteryear", but was critical to Scott Kolins' art, saying it "looks sloppy in individual panels".

== Collected editions ==
The series was collected into a single volume:

- Final Crisis: Rogues' Revenge (collects Final Crisis: Rogues' Revenge #1–3 and The Flash vol. 2 #182 and #197, 144 pages, hardcover, July 2009, ISBN 1-4012-2333-8; paperback, July 2010, ISBN 1-4012-2334-6)
