= Abra Kadabra (character) =

- Abra Kadabra as depicted in Flash Secret Files #1 (November 1997). Art by Oscar Jimenez and Anibal Rodriguez.

Publication information
- Publisher: DC Comics
- First appearance: The Flash #128 (May 1962)
- Created by: John Broome; Carmine Infantino

In-story information
- Alter ego: Citizen Abra
- Species: Human
- Team affiliations: The Rogues; Secret Society of Super Villains; Legion of Zoom
- Notable aliases: Abhararakadhararbarakh; Dr. Petrou; Professor Zoom
- Abilities: Magic; Expertise in gadgetry and prestidigitation

Abra Kadabra (Citizen Abra) is a supervillain appearing in American comic books published by DC Comics. Created by John Broome and Carmine Infantino, he first appeared as the primary antagonist of the Flash in The Flash #128 (May 1962).

Abra Kadabra has made several animated appearances and appeared in two episodes of the live-action Arrowverse series The Flash, portrayed by David Dastmalchian.

== Fictional character biography ==
The Flash #133 (December 1962), cover art by Carmine Infantino

Citizen Abra is from the 64th century, at a time when science has made stage magic obsolete. He desires a career as a performing magician so he goes back in time to find an audience to entertain, stealing a time machine and inventing a device to paralyze the guards, and soon clashes with the Flash (Barry Allen). He has a hypnotic device that makes people clap regardless of their thoughts; he uses the device to force applause from audiences even when they do not appreciate his magic tricks. He nevertheless finds that his magic is being overlooked, so decides to involve himself in important events. When the Flash tries to stop a crime he is committing, he forces the Flash to clap, enabling him to escape. He is able to send the Flash into space after challenging him to a fight at the theatre, but the Flash is able to change the course of the planetoid he is on so he is sent back to Earth, and finds Kadabra took his left-behind costume, meaning he can follow the impulses, and Kadabra is jailed. But he hypnotizes the Governor using a ray from a device made out of pots and pans, to let him out, and starts staging a puppet show where the Flash is defeated by a puppet called Captain Cream-Puff. When the Flash passes a poster advertising Kadabra, he is turned into a puppet and used in the performance. The Flash is able to restore himself slightly using the organic matter in his brain, which was not transformed, and then reverse Kadabra's ray so he is restored completely. He again defeats Kadabra.

In one of his many confrontations with the Flash, Abra Kadabra's technology is damaged and his body becomes insubstantial and wraith-like. After his body is returned to normal, he is captured by a bounty hunter named Peregrine and returned to his native century to serve a death sentence, although he is saved by the Flash before he can be executed.

Shortly after returning to the 21st century, during the Underworld Unleashed storyline, he forgoes his technological implements and tricks five Rogues into selling their souls to Neron so he can gain genuine magical powers while becoming an actual magician. Abra Kadabra kidnaps Linda Park, the girlfriend of Wally West (Barry Allen's protégé and successor), during their wedding and erases her from history, though he is ultimately defeated with the help of Walter West, Wally's counterpart from an alternate dimension.

In Infinite Crisis, Abra Kadabra becomes a member of the Secret Society of Super Villains.

In "One Year Later", he and several other Rogues are approached by Inertia with a plan to kill the Flash (Bart Allen). Though Inertia is defeated, Kadabra and the other Rogues successfully beat Bart to death, though not before Kadabra recognizes that Bart is too young to be the Flash they are used to dealing with.

=== Salvation Run ===
Abra Kadabra is one of the exiled villains featured in Salvation Run, along with his fellow Rogues: Captain Cold, Heat Wave, Weather Wizard, and Mirror Master. Upon coming across Cygnus 4019's local pygmies, Abra Kadabra deciphers their language and uses it to locate a "safe zone" for himself and the other Rogues before leading the other villains dispatched there to it.

He was a member of the Rogues who joined Libra's Secret Society of Super Villains; however, the rest of the Rogues left the Society.

He was last seen in The Flash: Rebirth off-panel, being attacked by Professor Zoom the Reverse-Flash. In the final issue of the miniseries, Kadabra is seen to have survived Zoom's attack and says Zoom should have made sure he was dead.

=== DC Rebirth ===
Abra Kadabra makes his Post-DC Rebirth debut in the Titans series. He first appears as a bumbling and terrible party magician known as Mister Hocus Pocus. When Lilith forms a psionic link with Wally West to try and uncover who or what removed 10 years of history from everyone's memories, she accidentally awakens Abra Kadabra from within Mister Hocus Pocus. Abra Kadabra reveals he is the one who made Wally disappear and he will now destroy him.

Abra Kadabra creates younger puppet duplicates of the Titans and has them fight the Titans. When the puppet Lilith finds Linda Park and tells Abra Kadabra of her importance to Wally, Abra Kadabra realizes that history is broken, knowing that Wally and Linda will not meet years from now. Abra Kadabra realizes that his plans must be sped up, and before he can contemplate this any further, he is attacked by Garth. Abra tries to kill him, but only succeeds in injuring Garth due to Wally's interference. Abra Kadabra reveals to Wally that he removed the latter from time and recollection because he always managed to thwart Abra Kadabra's plans, and disappears with his puppet Titans afterwards. At the theater, Abra Kadabra tries to receive evaluations of the Titans from his puppets. Abra Kadabra reveals his origin (which is similar to his pre-Flashpoint origin) to his puppets, revealing that he is from the future and traveled back in time to become famous, but his plans were always thwarted by the Flash (Barry Allen) and Kid Flash (Wally West). Abra Kadabra then used almost all of his power to throw Wally into the time stream, but it removed his memories in the process. Intrigued as to why history has been knocked askew, due to the fact Wally knows Linda (even hinting that he knows the true perpetrator), Abra Kadabra begins to craft an even greater trick and kidnaps Linda in front of Wally.

He then attempts to force Wally into a position where Wally will run himself into the Speed Force, believing that Wally will be unable to return without Linda as his 'lightning rod', but Wally is able to return by using the Titans as his own lightning rod after talking with a representation of his memories of Linda in the Speed Force, which assures him that he can still win Linda back. With Abra Kadabra defeated and sending him into the time stream, Lilith notes that she cannot understand Abra Kadabra's madness, but picked up a key word in his thoughts as "Manhattan".

== Powers and abilities ==
Typically possessing no inherent magical abilities, the bulk of Abra Kadabra's powers are derived from advanced 64th century science ("techno-magic") to perform feats such as teleportation, telepathy, telekinesis, time manipulation and other abilities that make him appear truly magical and can be performed with and without a wand. His forte includes being able to perform physical transformations on his foes.

In DC Rebirth, his scientific abilities are originate from his M-Metal wand, a technological wand suffused with reality-altering that can simulate magical feats. At times, Abra has sought and conferred true magic to perform similar feats, first by a magical bargain deal with Neron before reverting. He also gained magical powers from a Fifth Dimensional imp analogue modelled after himself.

== Other versions ==
=== Elseworlds ===
In the Elseworlds story Conjurors, Abra Kadabra is among the magic-users gathered by Jonathan Arcane.

=== Flashpoint ===
An alternate timeline version of Abra Kadabra appears in the Flashpoint tie-in Flashpoint: Secret Seven. This version is a television presenter and a member of the eponymous team.

== In other media ==
=== Television ===
- Abra Kadabra makes a non-speaking cameo appearance in the Justice League Unlimited episode "Flash and Substance".
- Abra Kadabra appears in Batman: The Brave and the Bold, voiced by Jeff Bennett.
- Abra Kadabra appears in Young Justice, voiced again by Jeff Bennett.
- Abra Kadabra appears in The Flash, portrayed by David Dastmalchian. This version, also known as Phillipe, is a cyborg whose powers are derived from nanotechnology. In his self-titled episode, Kadabra is pursued by Gypsy for crimes he committed on Earth-19 and arrives on Earth-1 to steal components for a time machine so he can return to his own time. However, he is defeated by the Flash, Kid Flash, Vibe, and Gypsy. Before Gypsy takes him back to Earth-19 to be executed, Kadabra taunts the Flash by withholding his knowledge of Savitar's true identity, knowing Savitar kills Iris West by his time and relishing being able to do so by proxy. In the episode "Central City Strong", Kadabra returns to build an anti-matter bomb to destroy Central City in retaliation for his family being erased from existence following the events of "Crisis on Infinite Earths". While the Flash talks him down and sympathizes with him as he also lost a loved one during the Crisis, they are attacked by a monster, later called "Fuerza". After it absorbs the bomb's anti-matter energy, Kadabra tries to save the Flash, but is killed by Fuerza.

=== Video games ===
- Abra Kadabra appears in DC Universe Online's "The Lightning Strikes" DLC, voiced by Christopher Loveless.
- Abra Kadabra appears as a character summon in Scribblenauts Unmasked: A DC Comics Adventure.

=== Miscellaneous ===
Abra Kadabra appears in the novel The Flash: The Tornado Twins.
