= Trickster (DC Comics) =

Fictional characters, DC Comics supervillains of the Flash

- The Trickster (James Jesse) makes his debut in The Flash (vol. 1) #113 (June–July 1960), evading the Flash.

Publication information
- Publisher: DC Comics
- First appearance: (Jesse); The Flash #113 (June–July 1960) (Walker); The Flash (vol. 2) #183 (April 2002) (Kaiyo); Batman/Superman #2 (September 2013)
- Created by: (Jesse); John Broome; Carmine Infantino (Walker); Geoff Johns; Scott Kolins (Kaiyo); Greg Pak; Jae Lee

In-story information
- Alter ego: Giovanni Giuseppe; Axel Walker; Kaiyo
- Species: Human
- Team affiliations: (Both); Rogues (Jesse); Secret Society of Super Villains; Black Lantern Corps; Justice League of Anarchy
- Notable aliases: James Montgomery Jesse
- Abilities: (Jesse); Skilled acrobat and con artist Above-average intelligence (Both); Utilize gadgets that give a variety of abilities, like walking on air

The Trickster is a moniker used by three supervillains who appeared in American comic books published by DC Comics, two of whom are enemies of the Flash. Both have been members of the Rogues.

Both the James Jesse and Axel Walker incarnations of the character have been substantially adapted into television productions of DC Comics work. Actor Mark Hamill is most closely associated with the role, having played Jesse in two live-action television series and voiced the character in several animated and video game appearances. Devon Graye portrayed Walker in The Flash television series.

== Creation and publication history ==
James Jesse first appeared in The Flash #113 (June–July 1960) and was created by John Broome and Carmine Infantino. Infantino originally designed the character for the issue's cover, which became the basis of its plot and the character's history.

Axel Walker debuted in The Flash (vol. 2) #183 (April 2002) and was created by Geoff Johns and Scott Kolins.

== Fictional character biography ==
=== James Jesse ===
The original Trickster (real name Giovanni Giuseppe) is the practical joker and con man whose favorite occupation is damaging enemies like the Flash with items such as explosive teddy bears.

Giuseppe, also known as James Jesse, is a circus acrobat who decided to become a criminal like his "reverse namesake" Jesse James. He created shoes that allowed him to walk on air to first help him in the trapeze shows his family was in, as every member of his family was a trapeze expert and his father wanted him to be one also, and other dangerous gag gadgets for his crimes. After Barry Allen's death, the Trickster relocates to Hollywood, where he spends some time working in special effects.

In the miniseries Underworld Unleashed, Neron tries to create Hell on Earth. When Jesse tricked his way into Neron's domain, it was only to find himself an expected visitor. Neron made vague promises to Jesse, and seemed to keep Jesse in his confidences. Trickster manages to trick Neron and defeat him with Captain Marvel's help. Upon finding himself back on Earth, Trickster laments that he had engineered "the greatest sting of all time" and no one had witnessed it. Trickster begins using his con artist skills for good, collecting the weapons of incarcerated supervillains because such things were too dangerous to be left lying around and could fall into the wrong hands.

In the series Countdown to Final Crisis, Trickster and Pied Piper go on the run after the other Rogues murder Bart Allen. After attending Bart's funeral in secret, Piper and the Trickster are captured by Deadshot and Multiplex and handcuffed together with cuffs that will explode if they are tampered with, separated by a five-foot chain. They manage to escape from their captors, but remain shackled together. The two are eventually tracked down by Deadshot, who kills Trickster. Pied Piper survives and escapes on the train. Unable to destroy the cuffs, Piper chops off Trickster's left hand after carrying his corpse as far as he can. Pied Piper is later transported to Apokolips, where he is freed from Trickster's hand and destroys Apokolips in retaliation for Trickster's death. He escapes the destruction of Apokolips via a Boom Tube.

In Blackest Night: The Flash #1, Trickster is reanimated as a Black Lantern. He was later resurrected following the DC Rebirth relaunch.

=== Axel Walker ===
The second Trickster (Axel Walker)

While the first Trickster was working for the FBI, teenager Axel Walker stole all of Jesse's gadgets and shoes and became the new Trickster. He joins Blacksmith's Network and is given new "toys" in addition to Jesse's originals. After the defeat of Blacksmith, he is invited to join the new Rogues led by Captain Cold, and accepted. He remains with the new Rogues until the "reformed" Rogues attempted to stop Cold. While the two Tricksters were fighting, the Top gave Jesse's memory back. The original Trickster defeats his successor and forces him into retirement.

With James Jesse dead, Walker returns as the Trickster in the series Final Crisis: Rogues' Revenge. Throughout the series, Walker is taught what it takes to be a true Rogue. At the end of the series, Trickster participates in the murder of Inertia.

In September 2011, The New 52 rebooted DC's continuity. In this new timeline, Trickster is reintroduced as a member of the Black Razors, the team responsible for dealing with the Daemonites' invasion. He is later seen as a part of Glider's Rogues, and rescues Captain Cold. He attempts to reason with an invading Gorilla Grodd, which leads to him losing his right arm. Trickster is later equipped with a prosthetic limb.

=== Kaiyo ===
Another Trickster appears in Batman/Superman as part of the New 52 continuity. A trickster god from Apokolips, Kaiyo is an agent of Darkseid with the power to move between worlds at will. She pursues Batman, Superman, and their counterparts on Earth-2 prior to that world's destruction and is responsible for the first encounter between the Man of Steel and the Dark Knight. Her appearance on Earth-2 leads to Darkseid's discovery of and later siege upon that world, while she also leaves behind a relic which will contribute to the resurrection of Damian Wayne.

== Powers and abilities ==
The Trickster has a number of trick items that he employs. This includes itching powder, potato head bombs, exploding rubber chickens and yo-yos, sharpened jacks, hard shell candy, and various other joke-themed weapons.

The Trickster wears a pair of shoes that allow him to fly for up to 10 hours.

== Other versions ==
- An alternate timeline version of Axel Walker / Trickster called the Trixter appears in the Flashpoint tie-in Citizen Cold. This version is an ally of the eponymous Citizen Cold and successor to an unnamed Trickster. Initially imprisoned in Iron Heights Penitentiary, Trixter takes advantage of a mass breakout to join Mirror Master's Rogues despite not being invited to join them to secretly sabotage them while they attempt to seek revenge on Citizen Cold. After revealing his ruse, Mirror Master kills Trixter.
- A heroic, futuristic incarnation of the Trickster called the Trixster appears in The Flash (vol. 3) as a police officer and member of the Renegades from the 25th century.
- A genderbent incarnation of James Jesse / Trickster named Jesse James appears in Absolute Flash. This version was a corporal in the U.S. Army before she, along with her unit the Rogues, was dishonorably discharged for taking bribes from a foreign government. They were subsequently approached by Project Olympus, who recruited them and equipped with experimental technology.

== In other media ==
=== Television ===
- The James Jesse incarnation of the Trickster appears in The Flash (1990), portrayed by Mark Hamill. This version, also known as James Montgomery Jesse, is a wanted criminal psychopath who has committed mass killings in various states. In his self-titled episode, Jesse develops a psychotic obsession with and kidnaps private investigator Megan Lockhart (portrayed by Joyce Hyser), and labels her as his sidekick "Prank" before he is ultimately apprehended by the Flash with Lockhart's help. In the series finale, "The Trial of the Trickster", Jesse escapes from his trial with help from Zoey Clark (portrayed by Corinne Bohrer), the wealthy owner of Clarx Toys and fan of his. After convincing him she was always Prank, they kidnap and brainwash the Flash, but Jesse leaves her for the police while the Flash regains his identity and apprehends him once more. In 1995, the two episodes were edited together into a film and released on VHS as The Flash II: Revenge of the Trickster. Had the show been renewed for a second season, the producers had plans for a team-up episode with Captain Cold and Mirror Master.
- The James Jesse incarnation of the Trickster appears in the Justice League Unlimited episode "Flash and Substance", voiced by Mark Hamill. This version is designed to resemble Hamill's previous portrayal and is depicted as being aware of his psychosis. He attempts to aid the Rogues in their vendetta against the Flash, but they disagree with his outlandish plan and abandon him. Disgruntled by this, Trickster heads to a supervillain bar where the Flash, Batman, and Orion arrive to interrogate him for information on the speedster's assassins. Batman and Orion attempt to use force, but the Flash takes over and politely convinces Trickster to tell them about the Rogues' plans in exchange for Trickster turning himself in and returning to the hospital.
- The James Jesse and the Axel Walker incarnations of the Trickster and Zoey Clark / Prank appear in The Flash (2014), portrayed again by Mark Hamill, Devon Graye, and Corinne Bohrer respectively. This version of Jesse terrorized Central City twenty years prior before he was imprisoned in Iron Heights Penitentiary. Additionally, Walker is his and Clark's son and the former's protégé.
  - An Earth-3 incarnation of James Jesse / Trickster makes a cameo appearance in the episode "The Present", also portrayed by Hamill.
- The James Jesse incarnation of the Trickster appears in the Justice League Action short "Missing the Mark", voiced again by Mark Hamill.
- The James Jesse incarnation of the Trickster appears in the Scooby-Doo and Guess Who? episode "One Minute Mysteries!", voiced again by Mark Hamill.

=== Film ===
- The Axel Walker incarnation of the Trickster appears in Lego DC Comics Super Heroes: Justice League: Attack of the Legion of Doom, voiced by Mark Hamill.
- The Axel Walker incarnation of the Trickster makes a non-speaking cameo appearance in Lego DC Comics Super Heroes: The Flash.
- An unidentified Trickster makes a non-speaking cameo appearance in Justice League Dark: Apokolips War.
- The Axel Walker incarnation of the Trickster makes a non-speaking cameo appearance in Injustice.

=== Video games ===
- The James Jesse incarnation of the Trickster appears in The Flash (1993).
- The James Jesse incarnation of the Trickster appears in DC Universe Online, voiced by Paul Wensley.
- The James Jesse and Axel Walker incarnations of Trickster appear as character summons in Scribblenauts Unmasked: A DC Comics Adventure.
- The Axel Walker incarnation of the Trickster appears as a playable character in Lego Batman 3: Beyond Gotham, voiced by Troy Baker.
- The Axel Walker incarnation of the Trickster appears as a playable character in Lego DC Super-Villains, voiced again by Mark Hamill.
