= Golden Glider =

Fictional character by DC Comics

- Golden Glider as depicted in Who's Who: The Definitive Directory of the DC Universe #9 (November 1985). Art by Irv Novick.

Publication information
- Publisher: DC Comics
- First appearance: The Flash #250 (June 1977)
- Created by: Cary Bates; Irv Novick

In-story information
- Alter ego: Lisa Snart
- Species: Human (Pre-Flashpoint); Metahuman (Post-Flashpoint)
- Place of origin: Central City
- Team affiliations: Rogues; Black Lantern Corps; Legion of Zoom
- Notable aliases: Lisa Star, Goldie, Glider
- Abilities: Olympic-level figure skater Skilled inventor of jewel-themed gadgets and weaponry Wears experimental skates (The New 52): Astral form that grants: Flight; Ribbon-like tendrils Ability to move at extreme speeds

Golden Glider (Lisa Snart) is a supervillain appearing in American comic books published by DC Comics. She is the younger sister of Captain Cold and enemy of the Flash.

Lisa Snart appeared in the first and second seasons of The Flash, portrayed by Peyton List, as well as the third season of Harley Quinn and the spin-off series Kite Man: Hell Yeah!, voiced by Cathy Ang and Stephanie Hsu respectively.

== Publication history ==
Created by Cary Bates and Irv Novick, the character made her first appearance in The Flash #250 (June 1977). Editor Julius Schwartz was also involved in the character's creation, and may have been responsible for the name Golden Glider.

== Fictional character biography ==
Lisa Snart is a figure skater, known by the alias Lisa Star, who has help in her career from her secret coach and lover, the Top, a foe of Barry Allen / Flash who dies after being injured in a battle with him. Furious over his death, Snart vows revenge, adopting an orange ice-skater's costume, a mask, and ice skates which create their own ice flow, which allow her to effectively skate on air. She also has diamonds and jewels that can be used as explosives or hypnotic devices. Golden Glider seeks revenge against Allen for several years and frequently collaborates in her heists with her brother, who is very protective of her.

After Barry Allen's death, Snart retires from crime and becomes a mercenary alongside Captain Cold. Eventually she returns to crime, with a series of partners, all code-named Chillblaine, whom she supplies with a replica of her brother's cold gun. The final version of Chillblaine is described as more intelligent and ruthless than his predecessors. He kills Snart with the weapon she gave him, then holds Keystone City for ransom with the aid of Doctor Polaris. Flash barely manages to defeat them. Chillblaine is then killed by Cold in retaliation. Her death has been a constant source of grief for her older brother.

In Blackest Night, Golden Glider is revived as a Black Lantern before being killed by Cold.

=== The New 52 and Rebirth ===
In The New 52 continuity reboot, Lisa Snart's murder is no longer in continuity and she is alive. In this continuity, she is dying of a brain tumor; she survives after the tumor is removed, but expresses shame over her brother's actions. Later, she mysteriously appears in South America, going by the name "Glider" and having gained metahuman abilities. She is shown recruiting Weather Wizard for an unknown purpose after his battle with the Flash. She recruits Heat Wave, the Trickster, and Mirror Master to join her faction to exact revenge on Flash, but is stopped with the help of Pied Piper and her brother.

Lisa and the Rogues later make peace with Snart as they help him stop Gorilla Grodd, which leads the U.S government to pardon them. Lisa is revealed to be in a relationship with Mirror Master, whom she managed to bring back to their dimension at great risk to herself. Afterwards, she ends up in a deep coma until Pied Piper revives her to come to the Rogues' aid when The Secret Society of Super Villains and the Royal Flush Gang attack.

Lisa and the Rogues make their first cameo appearance, in the DC Rebirth storyline, in The Flash (vol. 4) #3 watching a news report about the many newly created speedsters appearing throughout the city. They later make their first full-length appearance in The Flash (vol. 4) #15, attempting to steal a valuable golden statue of the god Mercury from Corto Maltese. The Flash arrives to stop them, but they turn out to be mirror constructs created to distract him.

== Powers and abilities ==
Golden Glider is an Olympic-level figure skater who possesses experimental skates that can create their own ice, allowing her to skate on any surface and in mid-air. She also wields jewel-themed gadgets and weaponry.

In The New 52 continuity, Golden Glider is a metahuman capable of flying, becoming intangible, and generating sharp, ribbon-like tendrils.

== Other versions ==
- An alternate timeline version of Lisa Snart appears in the Flashpoint tie-in Citizen Cold. After killing her abusive father, she was arrested and incarcerated in Iron Heights Penitentiary, where she is kidnapped by the Rogues. Her brother Citizen Cold tries to save her, only to learn that Rogues member Fallout had killed her.
- An alternate universe version of Lisa Snart, simply called Glider, appears in Absolute Flash. This version was a sergeant in the U.S. Army before she and her unit, the Rogues, were dishonorably discharged for taking bribes from a foreign government before being recruited by Project Olympus, who equipped them with experimental technology. Additionally, she lost her legs in the line of duty and received high-tech prosthetics from Project Olympus.

== In other media ==
=== Television ===
Peyton List as Lisa Snart / Golden Glider on The Flash.

- Lisa Snart / Golden Glider appears in The Flash, portrayed by Peyton List. This version is a wild child who is eager to prove herself to her older brother Leonard Snart / Captain Cold and wields a "gold gun" capable of transmuting anything into gold.
- Golden Glider appears in Harley Quinn, voiced by Cathy Ang. This version is Kite Man's new love interest and possesses the New 52 incarnation's powers. In her most notable appearance in the episode "The 83rd Annual Villy Awards", she and Kite Man encounter Harley Quinn and Poison Ivy at the titular award show, where Glider later bonds with Ivy over their social anxiety.
  - Golden Glider appears in Kite Man: Hell Yeah!, voiced by Stephanie Hsu as an adult and Araceli Prasarttongosoth as a child.

=== Video games ===
- Golden Glider appears as a character summon in Scribblenauts Unmasked: A DC Comics Adventure.
- Golden Glider appears as an unlockable playable character in Lego DC Super-Villains, voiced by Catherine Taber.

=== Miscellaneous ===
- A teenage supervillain inspired by Golden Glider named Ice Kate appears in Teen Titans Go! #53.
- Golden Glider appears in the Injustice: Gods Among Us prequel comic as a member of the Rogues, who work with Batman's Insurgency to stop High Councilor Superman by attacking the latter's bases, and is in a relationship with Mirror Master. During one of their missions, they are intercepted by Bizarro, who kills Heat Wave and Weather Wizard. Glider's abilities help her survive until the Trickster distracts Bizarro long enough for Glider and Mirror Master to escape. The pair later hold an informal memorial service for the fallen Rogues and allow the Flash to join them after he promises not to turn them in to Superman.
