= List of DC Comics characters: Y =

== Yankee Doodle Dandy ==
Yankee Doodle Dandy (John Dandy) is a character appearing in American comic books published by DC Comics. He first appeared in Doom Patrol (vol. 2) #52 (January 1992), and was created by writer Grant Morrison and artist Richard Case.

Dandy is a government operative who works for the Pentagon and stole the formula for "pseudoderm" (used in the Question's mask) from its inventor, Aristotle Rodor. This enables him to appear faceless and makes him a master of disguise.

== Yo-Yo ==
Yo-Yo is the name of two characters appearing in American comic books published by DC Comics.

The first incarnation is an unnamed henchman of the Joker in the Flashpoint timeline, resembling Harley Quinn. She first appeared in Flashpoint (vol. 2) #1 (2011), and was created by Geoff Johns and Andy Kubert.

In 2011, The New 52 rebooted the DC universe. Chang Jie-Ru uses the name as a member of the Suicide Squad. He has the ability to increase and decrease his mass. At Belle Reve, Yo-Yo is caught up in a supervillain prison riot, tasked alongside Deadshot and El Diablo with quelling the inmate rebellion. He is ordered by Amanda Waller to retrieve King Shark from his holding cell. Yo-Yo uses his ability to slip through the bars, where King Shark kills him.

=== Yo-Yo in other media ===
The Flashpoint incarnation of Yo-Yo appears in Justice League: The Flashpoint Paradox, voiced by Hynden Walch.

== Yuda ==
- First appearance: Krypton Chronicles #3
- Aliases: Mistress of the Moons

Yuda is a character appearing in American comic books published by DC Comics.

The character first appeared in Krypton Chronicles #3 (November 1981), and was created by E. Nelson Bridwell and Curt Swan.

Yuda is one of the chief deities of ancient Krypton, associated with love and marriage. She also represented the two moons of Krypton and was commonly known as "the Mistress of the Moons". For this reason, when the moons Mithen and Wegthor came together in the sky, they were believed to represent marriage.

Her worship ended when Jaf-El introduced the monotheistic worship of Krypton's sun god Rao. Despite this, she was remembered in folklore and a statue of her was used in certain festivities.

=== Yuda in other media ===
Yuda Kal appears in Supergirl, portrayed by Sofia Vassilieva via her host Olivia. This version is a Kryptonian goddess of life and birth worshipped by the Juru, the first people of Krypton. However, she was erased with Rao and the ways of science by modern Krypton, becoming feared as a dark, evil deity.
