= Underworld Unleashed =

1995 DC Comics multi-title comic book crossover event

- Cover of Underworld Unleashed #1 (November 1995) featuring Neron (top), Doctor Polaris, Lex Luthor, the Joker, Circe, and Abra Kadabra (bottom, left to right), art by Howard Porter.

Publication information
- Publisher: DC Comics
- Format: Miniseries
- Genre: Superhero; Crossover
- Publication date: November 1995 – late December 1995
- No. of issues: 3, plus several tie-in issues and four one-shot issues
- Main character(s): Justice League America; Neron; Trickster

Creative team as of November 1995
- Created by: Mark Waid; Howard Porter
- Written by: Mark Waid
- Artist(s): Howard Porter; Dan Green; Chris Eliopoulos; Dennis Janke; John Nyberg; Rick Taylor; Heroic Age (a.k.a. Pat Garrahy)
- Penciller: Howard Porter
- Inker(s): Dan Green (issues #1–2); Dennis Janke (issue #3); John Nyberg (issue #3)
- Letterer: Chris Eliopoulos
- Colorist(s): Rick Taylor (colorist); Heroic Age (a.k.a. Pat Garrahy; color separator)
- Editor(s): Brian Augustyn (editor); Stephen Wacker (assistant editor)

Underworld Unleashed was a multi-title American comic book crossover event released by DC Comics in 1995.

The main theme of Underworld Unleashed involved the new ruler of Hell, a demon-lord named Neron, offering first many of the DC Universe supervillains and then a number of the DC Universe superheroes various deals in exchange for their souls.

== Plot ==
Neron dupes five of the Rogues who typically battle the Flash: Captain Boomerang, Captain Cold, Heat Wave, the Mirror Master, and the Weather Wizard. He promises them a chance to go down in history as five of the greatest villains if they each engage in a specific destructive act. He does not tell them that it will cost them their lives and unleash him onto the Earth. Lex Luthor, the Joker, Circe, Doctor Polaris, and Abra Kadabra become his Inner Council.

Neron sends magical candles to many supervillains. When they are all lit, they transport the villains to Neron's underworld realm. Many villains accept his offer in exchange for their souls, but some do not. The newly empowered villains are sent back to Earth to wreak havoc while Neron turns his attention to the superheroes. Along the way, the Trickster comes to Neron, but does not make a deal with him. Instead, he helps Neron betray his Inner Council.

When the heroes come to Neron's realm looking to defeat him, they are corrupted by the influences of that realm. Trickster works out how Neron can be stopped, and instructs Captain Marvel to beat Neron at his own game by offering the demon his soul for purely selfless reasons. Unable to even touch the offer, Neron's work is reversed: breaking that one deal also broke all his others.

== Tie-in issues ==
Underworld Unleashed crossed over into nearly every DC Comics title that was being published at the time. Each tie-in issue mentioned the crossover event's title on the top of its front cover and pitted the respective series' title character or group against one or more different super-villains.

- The Adventures of Superman #530 — Hellgrammite
- Aquaman (vol. 5) #14 — Major Disaster
- Azrael #10 — Faux-Azrael
- Batman #525 — Mister Freeze
- Catwoman (vol. 2) #27 — Gorilla Grodd
- Damage #18 — Copperhead
- Detective Comics #691-692 — Spellbinder
- Extreme Justice #10-11 — Star Sapphire
- Fate #13 — Lady Blaze
- The Flash (vol. 2) #107 — Shadow Thief
- Green Arrow (vol. 2) #102-103 — Tezcatlipoca
- Green Lantern (vol. 3) #68-69 — Mister Freeze and Purgatory
- Guy Gardner: Warrior #36-37 — Blackguard, Earthworm, Cheetah and Evil Star
- Hawkman (vol. 3) #26-27 — Scarecrow and Neron
- Impulse #8 — Blockbuster
- Justice League America #105-106 — Killer Elite (Bolt, Chiller, Deadline, Deadshot and Merlyn)
- Justice League Task Force #30 — Brimstone, Shrapnel and Sledge
- Legion of Super-Heroes (vol. 4) #75 and Legionnaires #32 — Chronos
- Lobo (vol. 2) #22 — Bugmeister
- Manhunter (vol. 2) #11-12 — Psycho-Pirate
- Primal Force #13 — Lord Satanus
- The Ray (vol. 2) #18-19 — Atomic Skull
- R.E.B.E.L.S. '95 #13 — Ice Man
- Robin (VOL. 2) #23-24 — Killer Moth / Charaxes
- Spectre (vol. 3) #35-36 — Neron, Louis Snipe (the soul of a dead ordinary criminal)
- Starman (Volume 2) #13 — Doctor Phosphorus
- Steel #21 — Metallo
- Superboy (vol. 4) #22 – Killer Frost
- Superman: The Man of Tomorrow #3 — Lex Luthor

== Collected editions ==
- The three-issue miniseries Underworld Unleashed, together with the one-shot issue Underworld Unleashed: Abyss - Hell's Sentinel #1, was collected as a trade paperback called Underworld Unleashed (DC Comics, March 1998, 158 pages, ISBN 1-56389-447-5).
- In 2020, a new hardcover graphic novel, Underworld Unleashed: The 25th Anniversary Edition, was published, containing the three-issue miniseries plus the four one-shot issues Underworld Unleashed: Abyss - Hell's Sentinel #1, Underworld Unleashed: Apokolips - Dark Uprising #1, Underworld Unleashed: Batman - Devil's Asylum #1 and Underworld Unleashed: Patterns of Fear #1 (DC Comics, November 2020, 304 pp., ISBN 978-1779505781)).
