= David Singh (character) =

- Interior artwork from The Flash Secret Files & Origins 2010 (May 2010) DC Comics. Art by Francis Manapul.

Publication information
- Publisher: DC Comics
- First appearance: The Flash Secret Files and Origins 2010 (May 2010)
- Created by: Geoff Johns; Francis Manapul

In-story information
- Alter ego: David Singh
- Team affiliations: Central City Police Department
- Abilities: Detective skills; Forensic science

David Singh is a fictional character who appears in various DC Comics publications. He is the crime lab director for the Central City Police Department, who takes Barry Allen into his lab on Captain Darryl Frye's orders.

Singh appeared as a recurring cast member on The CW Arrowverse television series The Flash, portrayed by Patrick Sabongui. This version is initially a captain and later chief of police of the Central City Police Department. The character also guest starred in an episode of the fifth season of Arrow. Sanjeev Bhaskar portrayed Singh in the DC Extended Universe film The Flash.

== Fictional character biography ==
David Singh is the director of the crime lab at the Central City Police Department. When he takes over, the lab begins to emphasize the quantity of cases solved over quality, which resulted in the alienation of some longtime scientists, such as Patty Spivot. Barry Allen is back working for the C.C.P.D. and Captain Fyre has put him under Singh's charge. On his first day back Singh give him the case of the murdered Mirror Monarch. Singh later catches Barry looking through the files of Jason Hicks, a case that had been closed and already went to trial. Barry explains that Jason's mother came to him for help and accuses Singh of pretending to care about his job.

Singh is about to argue back but James Forrest calls him to his computer. Singh has Forrest check the Mirror Monarch's body for clues and Forrest finds blood that did not belong to the victim on his glove. The blood matches Barry Allen, but instead of accusing Barry, Singh yells at him for contaminating the crime scene. He then belittles Barry saying, if he wants to accuse people of being sloppy he should make sure his cases are clean first.

Later Singh notices the Hicks files are missing and so is Barry. Unknown to Singh, Barry gave the file to Iris West, who does research and learns that the real murderer was Rory Tork. Once Jason Hicks is freed, Singh re-examines his job and realizes that he may have closed cases in haste. In response, he reopens all closed cases from the past six months.

=== The New 52 ===
After the DC event Flashpoint, the entire DC Universe was altered into a five-year timeline. Singh is depicted as homosexual and in a relationship with the Pied Piper.

== Other versions ==
An alternate universe variant of David Singh appears in Flashpoint.

== In other media ==
- David Singh appears in series set in the Arrowverse, portrayed by Patrick Sabongui. This version is the CSI director in arrow season 2 episode 8 but later gets changed to captain, and later chief of police, in the Central City Police Department. Primarily appearing in The Flash (2014), Singh also appears in Arrow and Supergirl. Furthermore, an alternate universe variant of Singh from Earth-Two who became a criminal appears in the episode "Welcome to Earth-2".
- David Singh appears in The Flash (2023), portrayed by Sanjeev Bhaskar.
