= Weather Wizard =

- Weather Wizard as depicted in The Flash vol. 2 #175 (August 2001). Art by Scott Kolins and Doug Hazlewood.

Publication information
- Publisher: DC Comics
- First appearance: The Flash #110 (December 1959).
- Created by: John Broome; Carmine Infantino

In-story information
- Alter ego: Mark Mardon; Marco Mardon
- Species: (Mark): Metahuman (Marco): Human
- Place of origin: New Earth
- Team affiliations: Secret Society of Super Villains; Rogues
- Abilities: (Mark): Weather manipulation; Genius-level intellect; (Marco): Wand proficiency; Mechanical aptitude

Weather Wizard (Mark Mardon) is a supervillain appearing in American comic books published by DC Comics.

Weather Wizard made his first live-action appearance in the television specials Legends of the Superheroes (1979), played by Jeff Altman. The character later appeared in the television series The Flash, portrayed by Liam McIntyre. Additionally, his brother Clyde Mardon appeared in the 2014 pilot episode of The Flash, portrayed by Chad Rook.

== Publication history ==
Created by John Broome and Carmine Infantino, the character made his first appearance in The Flash #110 (December 1959).

== Fictional character biography ==
Mark Mardon is the brother of Clyde Mardon, a scientist who discovered a method to control weather before dying of a heart attack. It is later implied that Mardon murdered his brother and either lied about or blocked out the memory of finding his body. Mardon takes Clyde's notes and used them to make a wand to generate weather, becoming the criminal Weather Wizard.

The Weather Wizard, in his original costume, on the cover of The Flash #145 (June 1964). Art by Carmine Infantino (pencils) and Murphy Anderson (inks).

After Barry Allen's death during Crisis on Infinite Earths, the Weather Wizard went into semi-retirement for a while, until, during Underworld Unleashed, he teamed up with other Rogues which included Captain Cold, Heat Wave, Captain Boomerang, and Mirror Master, as part of a ploy for greater power. This ends with the Rogues being killed and the demon Neron being released. They were later resurrected as soulless demons by Neron to use against Barry Allen's successor, Wally West, who manipulateds Neron into returning the Rogues' souls.

Weather Wizard joined up with Blacksmith and her Rogues. Through her, he learns he has a son from a one-night stand with Keystone City police officer Julie Jackham. Their son, Josh, had exhibited internalized weather-controlling abilities and Mardon wanted to have the same ability without the use of his wand. He tried to kidnap Josh from Wally's wife, Linda, and dissect him to understand how his son gained that ability, but hesitated to harm the child. He was stopped by Flash and sent to Iron Heights, but escaped. After Blacksmith's group disbanded, the Weather Wizard, along with Mirror Master and Trickster, joined up with Captain Cold, who declared himself the leader of the Rogues. Mardon was also the representative of the Rogues for the Secret Society of Super Villains.

In One Year Later, Inertia approaches the Rogues with a plan to kill the Flash (Bart Allen). He destroys Weather Wizard's wand and removes the mental blocks that prevent him from using his powers without it. Though Inertia is eventually defeated, the other Rogues beat Bart to death. Weather Wizard is horrified to discover that they killed a child.

In Final Crisis: Rogues' Revenge, Weather Wizard and the rest of the Rogues reject Libra's offer, wanting to stay out of the game. Before they can retire, they hear of Inertia escaping and work together to kill him.

=== The New 52 ===
In The New 52 continuity reboot, Weather Wizard is a Latino crime lord named Marco Mardon. After his father's death, Marco runs away, eventually becoming the Weather Wizard, but is called back after his brother Claudio's murder. The Flash, looking for Patty Spivot who had been kidnapped, later attacks and submits Mardon forcing Elsa, his brother's widow, to reveal she was the kidnapper and also Claudio's killer. This revelation drives Marco to the edge, making him attempt a suicide-murder by calling lightning to strike himself and Elsa, but he survives and is approached by the Golden Glider for an unknown plot.

== Powers, abilities, and equipment ==
Weather Wizard originally wields a wand that enables him to control weather patterns. He has utilized it to project blizzards, summon lightning bolts, fly via air currents, create fog, and generate winds. Essentially, he could produce any type of weather imaginable, as well as other phenomena such as tornadoes. Thanks to Inertia's 30th-century psychological therapies, his mental blocks were permanently removed. Weather Wizard can now manipulate the weather without his wand.

== Other versions ==
- Weather Weasel, a funny animal incarnation of Weather Wizard, appears in Captain Carrot and His Amazing Zoo Crew.
- An alternate universe version of Weather Wizard from Earth-33, a world populated by magicians, appears in Countdown to Adventure #3.
- An unnamed former prostitute equipped with one of Weather Wizard's wands named Weather Witch appears in "Gotham Underground" and Final Crisis: Rogues' Revenge as a member of the New Rogues.
- An alternate timeline version of Weather Wizard appears in the Flashpoint tie-in Citizen Cold. This version is a founding member of the Rogues who seeks revenge on Citizen Cold for murdering his brother Clyde before eventually being killed by him.
- A futuristic incarnation of Weather Wizard called Weather Warlock appears in The Flash (vol. 3) as a police officer and member of the Renegades from the 25th century.
- An alternate universe incarnation of Weather Wizard appears in Absolute Flash. This version acquired his powers after being experimented on by Project Olympus.

== In other media ==
=== Television ===
Liam McIntyre (left) and Chad Rook (right) portray Mark and Clyde Mardon respectively on The CW's The Flash.

- Weather Wizard appears in Legends of the Superheroes, portrayed by Jeff Altman. This version is a member of the Legion of Doom.
- The writers of The Flash (1990), Danny Bilson and Paul DeMeo, attempted to use Weather Wizard, but did not have enough money to do so and had to wait until they had a larger budget. Ultimately however, the plan failed to materialize after the show was canceled.
- A character based on Weather Wizard called Dr. Eno / Weatherman appears in Justice League of America, portrayed by Miguel Ferrer.
- Weather Wizard appears in Batman: The Brave and the Bold, voiced by Robin Atkin Downes. This version is a member of the Rogues and the Legion of Doom.
- Weather Wizard appears in Robot Chicken DC Comics Special 2: Villains in Paradise, voiced by Matthew Senreich. This version is a member of the Legion of Doom.
- Mark and Clyde Mardon appear in The Flash (2014), portrayed by Liam McIntyre and Chad Rook respectively. Introduced in the series pilot, these versions are bank robbers and the father and uncle of Joslyn "Joss" Jackam / Weather Witch respectively who were caught in a plane crash when S.T.A.R. Labs' particle accelerator exploded, giving them both the ability to manipulate the weather. After Joe West kills Clyde, Mark attempts to seek revenge, facing the Flash on several occasions along the way.
- Mark Mardon makes a non-speaking appearance in the second season of Vixen.

==== DC Animated Universe ====
Weather Wizard appears in series set in the DC Animated Universe (DCAU), voiced initially by Miguel Ferrer and subsequently by Corey Burton.

- Introduced in the Superman: The Animated Series episode "Speed Demons", this version is a former extortionist from Central City and brother of Ben Mardon. Weather Wizard takes advantage of Superman and the Flash's competition for the title of the "fastest man alive" to siphon their energy to power his weather-manipulating machinery and track their coordinates, both through arm bands the pair are wearing. However, the heroes discover Weather Wizard's plans and defeat him with Ben's help.
- Weather Wizard appears in the Justice League episode "Hereafter". He joins the Superman Revenge Squad to pursue their eponymous goal, only to be defeated by Batman.
- Weather Wizard appears in Justice League Unlimited as a member of Gorilla Grodd's Secret Society before being killed by Darkseid.

=== Film ===
- Weather Wizard appears in films set in the DC Animated Movie Universe (DCAMU).
  - He first appears in Justice League vs. Teen Titans, voiced by Rick D. Wasserman. This version is a member of the Legion of Doom.
  - Weather Wizard makes a non-speaking appearance in Justice League Dark: Apokolips War.
- Weather Wizard makes a non-speaking cameo appearance in Injustice.
- Weather Wizard appears in Justice League x RWBY: Super Heroes & Huntsmen, voiced by Travis Willingham.

=== Video games ===
- Weather Wizard appears in Batman: The Brave and the Bold – The Videogame, voiced again by Corey Burton.
- Weather Wizard appears in DC Universe Online, voiced by Brandon Young.
- Weather Wizard appears as a character summon in Scribblenauts Unmasked: A DC Comics Adventure.

=== Miscellaneous ===
- A second, unnamed Weather Wizard resembling the mainstream incarnation appears in issue #38 of the Justice League Unlimited tie-in comic book.
- Weather Wizard appears in the Injustice: Gods Among Us prequel comic as a member of the Rogues, who work with Batman's Insurgency to cripple Superman's Regime, until he is killed by Bizarro.
