= Heat Wave (character) =

Supervillain appearing in DC Comics

- Heat Wave on the cover to The Flash (vol. 2) #218. Art by Howard Porter, Inked by Livesay.

Publication information
- Publisher: DC Comics
- First appearance: The Flash #140 (November 1963)
- Created by: John Broome (Writer); Carmine Infantino (artist)

In-story information
- Alter ego: Mick Rory
- Species: Human
- Place of origin: New Earth
- Team affiliations: Rogues; Secret Society of Super Villains; Legion of Doom; Suicide Squad
- Notable aliases: Rory Calhoun
- Abilities: Criminal mastermind; Pyrotechnics and explosives expert; Utilizes handheld flamethrower and asbestos suit; New 52: Pyrokinesis; Expert burglar

Heat Wave (Mick Rory) is a supervillain appearing in comic books published by DC Comics. He is commonly as an enemy of the Flash and a member of the Rogues along with Captain Cold, among others.

Actor Dominic Purcell has portrayed Heat Wave in The CW's Arrowverse television series The Flash and Legends of Tomorrow.

== Publication history ==
Heat Wave was first introduced in The Flash #140, written by John Broome. He was first made to be a rival for Captain Cold. In later comics by Geoff Johns, Rory looks to Captain Cold to help him keep his obsession at bay, though Cold thinks he'll eventually become beyond help.

== Fictional character biography ==
Mick Rory, in his debut as Heat Wave, as he appeared on the cover of The Flash #140 (November 1963 DC Comics). Art by Carmine Infantino and Murphy Anderson.

Born on a farm outside Central City, Mick Rory became fascinated with fire as a child. This fascination turned into an obsession and one night, he set his family's home ablaze. His obsession was so great that he simply watched the flames engulf his house, instead of running to get help.

As a result, Rory went to live with his uncle. However, his pyromania continued when Rory set a schoolmate’s house on fire in retaliation for locking him in a frozen meat locker on a school trip to a slaughterhouse, which resulted in Rory developing cryophobia— an intense fear of cold.

He later took a job as a fire eater with a traveling circus, but this was not enough to satiate his obsession, and he ended up setting the circus on fire.

These tragedies and compulsive episodes made him desperate to fight his fire obsession, and after seeing the Rogues in action in Central City, he decided to direct his mania to supervillainy. He created a protective costume from asbestos (in a story written before the dangers of asbestos were known), built the Hot Rod, a hand gun-sized flamethrower, and became Heat Wave. As he was committing crimes in Central City, it was inevitable that he would run into the Flash, which he did quite regularly. Subsequently, he also ended up in jail quite regularly. He also became an adversary of Captain Cold, due to his aversion to cold temperatures. It was Captain Cold who introduced Heat Wave to the Rogues, and in his first appearance they teamed up to get rid of the Flash as they competed over a newscaster they had both fallen in love with and fought each other as they each tried to complete a larger crime spree, but the Flash jailed them both.

Eventually, Mick went straight, due largely to the manipulations of the Top. He took a job as a firefighting consultant, using his vast knowledge on fires and heat. He also became good friends with Barry Allen, whose secret identity as Flash was discovered by Rory years before. Years later without explanation, Rory returned as Heat Wave.

During the Underworld Unleashed storyline, Abra Kadabra tricks Heat Wave and four other members of the Rogues into sacrificing themselves to unleash the demon Neron. Neron returns the Rogues' soulless bodies to Earth in a plan to force Flash into a deal. The five Rogues each wreak havoc, death, and destruction before Flash forces Neron to halt his actions and return the Rogues' souls to their bodies.

Heat Wave would only briefly return to his criminal ways before abandoning them to study with Zhutanian monks. Afterwards, he worked for Project Cadmus as a backup agent, but eventually quit that too and moved to the Quad Cities, Illinois, area. He eventually got a job at the FBI, along with other reformed members of the Rogues. This was a spectacular failure and Rory became a villain once again after the Top arrived and undid the mental program that had kept him reformed.

In Infinite Crisis, Heat Wave joins the Secret Society of Super Villains.

=== One Year Later ===
One Year Later, Heat Wave is next seen being recruited by Inertia to team up against Bart Allen. He is one of the rogues who deliver the killing blow to Bart. He freaks out about what he and the Rogues have done and flees only to be captured by Captain Boomerang alongside Weather Wizard. He is sent to "hell planet" Salvation with the other Rogues. When the conflict starts, he sides with Lex Luthor. When they beat Martian Manhunter, he is worried about killing another hero, claiming that they will kill them with rusty razors. He returns to Earth with the villains who are still alive.

=== Salvation Run ===
Heat Wave is one of the exiled villains featured in Salvation Run along with his fellow Rogues Captain Cold, Weather Wizard, Mirror Master, and Abra Kadabra.

=== Final Crisis: Rogues' Revenge ===
He was seen as the member of Rogues who joined Libra's Secret Society of Super Villains. In Final Crisis: Rogues' Revenge, Heat Wave and the rest of the Rogues reject Libra's offer, wanting to stay out of the game. Before they can retire, they hear of Inertia escaping and decide to stick around long enough to get revenge for being used, particularly after they find that Paul Gambi, the Rogues' tailor, has been badly beaten by the 'New Rogues' organised by Libra. During the hunt for Inertia, Heat Wave also kills Burn- his own counterpart in the 'New Rogues'- when the two shoot their weapons at each other, Heat Wave noting that Burn's costume was of poorer quality than his own, allowing him to burn Burn to death while he is barely sweating while subjected to Burn's own weapons. Captain Cold later has him kill Cold's father, abducted by Libra as a hostage against Cold. While Libra tries to hypnotize the Rogues, Captain Cold tells Rory to watch a nearby fire to retain his focus. When they are fighting Inertia, Rory melts his boots, making him unable to move. He then helps the other Rogues kill Inertia.

Once the crisis is over, the unarmed Human Flame seeks out Heat Wave, hoping to purchase one of his signature flamethrower guns after his own equipment was lost in a confrontation with the Mafia. After learning that the Human Flame can only offer him $5,000.00, Heat Wave refuses, denouncing Human Flame as "pathetic". Noting that Captain Cold advised against this meeting and he only agreed to see what the other man had to offer, Heat Wave gives Human Flame a harsh beating, the fight concluding with Heat Wave blowing up the fireworks factory they were meeting in, noting that he had always wanted to do something like that.

=== The Flash (vol. 3) ===
Heat Wave and the Rogues visit Sam Scudder's old hideout and unveil a giant mirror with the words In Case of Flash: Break Glass written on it. Rory is still on the run with The Rogues.

=== The New 52 ===
In September 2011, "The New 52" rebooted DC's continuity. In this timeline, Heat Wave possesses innate fire abilities and is a rival of Captain Cold, blaming him for the breakup of the Rogues. Both villains are defeated by the Flash, but meet with Cold's sister Golden Glider, who recruits him for an unknown plot.

== Powers and abilities ==
In the Pre-52 continuity, Heat Wave had no metahuman abilities. He created a flamethrower that allowed him to project intense streams of flame that reach temperatures well over 900 degrees Fahrenheit. The flame that his weaponry projects is so hot that it has been able to melt Flash's friction proof boots that allow Flash to run at light speed. Heat Wave carries in-depth knowledge of fire and pyrotechnics.

In "The New 52" continuity, Heat Wave merged his DNA with his flamethrower through unknown means, thus granting him the ability to project and manipulate fire from his own body.

=== Equipment ===
Heat Wave carries a hand-held flamethrower that allows him to project a concentrated stream of fire at opponents. He wears an asbestos suit with a breathing mask that affords him protection against fire and heat. His suit was once shown to be able to project heat as well, capable of staving off an attack from Captain Cold's cold gun, neutralizing solid projectiles, or melting his way through walls. Heat Wave has a pipe attached to his left arm that can project a fire retardant which allows him to put out fires.

== Other versions ==
- An alternate timeline version of Heat Wave appears in the Flashpoint tie-in Flashpoint: Legion of Doom. After killing Jason Rusch in an attempt to steal his connection to the Firestorm matrix, he is defeated by Cyborg, incarcerated in Doom prison, and put on death row. Amidst a prison break organized by Eel O'Brian, Heat Wave betrays and seemingly kills O'Brian before hijacking the prison in the hopes of using it to destroy Detroit, only to be thwarted by Cyborg and transferred to Belle Reve, unaware that O'Brian is inhabiting his cellmate's body.
- A heroic, 25th century incarnation of Heat Wave called Heatstroke appears in The Flash (vol. 3) as a police officer and member of the Renegades.
- A heroic alternate universe version of Mick Rory from Earth-3 appears in "Forever Evil". This version is a police officer partnered with Leonard Snart.
- An alternate universe version of Heat Wave appears in Absolute Flash. This version was experimented on by Project Olympus and transformed into a lava monster.

== In other media ==
=== Television ===
==== Animation ====
- Heat Wave was originally going to appear in Challenge of the Superfriends as a member of the League of Evil before the group was changed to the Legion of Doom and Heat Wave, among others, was cut from the series.
- Heat Wave appears in Justice League Unlimited, voiced by Lex Lang. This version is a member of Gorilla Grodd's Secret Society. Prior to and during the events of the episodes "Alive!" and "Destroyer", Lex Luthor takes over the Society, but Grodd launches a mutiny to retake command. Heat Wave sides with the former before Darkseid attacks and kills most of the Society. Luthor, Heat Wave, and the other survivors subsequently join forces with the Justice League to repel Darkseid's invasion of Earth.
- Heat Wave appears in the Batman: The Brave and the Bold episode "Requiem for a Scarlet Speedster!", voiced by Steve Blum. This version is a member of the Rogues.
- A genderbent incarnation of Heat Wave appears in My Adventures with Superman, voiced by Laila Berzins. This version is a gang leader who wields Kryptonian armor and flamethrowers that she received from Livewire, who she later enters a relationship with.

==== Live-action ====
Dominic Purcell as Heat Wave on the television series The Flash

Mick Rory / Heat Wave appears in media set in The CW's Arrowverse, portrayed by Dominic Purcell. This version is a pyromaniac with burns covering half of his body. Additionally, Mitchell Kummen portrays the character as a teenager.

- First appearing in The Flash, he receives an experimental "heat gun" and reluctantly joins his ex-partner Leonard Snart and the latter's sister Lisa Snart in forming the Rogues and battling the Flash across the first and second seasons.
- Rory also appears in Legends of Tomorrow, in which Rip Hunter recruits him and Leonard, among others, to form the Legends and stop Vandal Savage from conquering the world. In the first season, Rory betrays the team and is abandoned by Leonard in an unspecified location, where the Time Masters take him in and turn him into their personal bounty hunter Chronos. Rory hunts his former teammates until they defeat and eventually rehabilitate him before he rejoins the Legends to help them kill the Time Masters. In the second season, Rory is manipulated into joining the Legion of Doom, but he regrets his decision and helps the Legends defeat the Legion. In the third through sixth seasons, Rory encounters a past version of his abusive father Dick Rory, discovers a talent for writing, becomes a semi-popular romance novelist under the pen name "Rebecca Silver", accidentally conceives a daughter with his old high school girlfriend Ali, attempts to care for his daughter Lita, hands off his authorial work to teammate Mona Wu, has 48 alien hybrid children with the Necrian Kayla, and leaves the Legends to care for them.
- An alternate universe version of Rory appears in the crossover "Crisis on Infinite Earths". This version is a former member of the Legends after most of them retired and one died.

=== Film ===
Heat Wave makes a non-speaking appearance in Justice League: The Flashpoint Paradox as a member of the Rogues.

=== Video games ===
- Heat Wave appears in the NES version of Batman: The Video Game.
- Heat Wave appears in Batman: The Brave and the Bold – The Videogame, voiced again by Steve Blum.
- Heat Wave appears as a playable character in Lego Batman 3: Beyond Gotham, voiced by Robin Atkin Downes.
- Heat Wave appears in DC Universe Online, voiced by David Jennison. This version works as a tech-based arms dealer in the Hall of Doom.
- Heat Wave appears as a playable character in DC Unchained.
- Heat Wave appears as a character summon in Scribblenauts Unmasked: A DC Comics Adventure.
- Heat Wave appears in Lego DC Super-Villains, voiced by Lex Lang. This version is a member of the Legion of Doom and the Rogues.

=== Miscellaneous ===
- Heat Wave appears in issue #21 of the Justice League Unlimited tie-in comic book series, in which he enters a relationship with Killer Frost.
- Heat Wave appears in the Injustice: Gods Among Us prequel comic as a member of the Rogues, who work with Batman's Insurgency to cripple Superman's Regime, until he is killed by Bizarro.
