= Tar Pit (DC Comics) =

- Tar Pit as depicted in The Flash Secret Files #3 (September 2001). Art by Liam Sharp.

Publication information
- Publisher: DC Comics
- First appearance: The Flash (vol. 2) #174 (July 2001)
- Created by: Geoff Johns; Scott Kolins

In-story information
- Alter ego: Joseph "Joey" V. Monteleone
- Species: Metahuman
- Team affiliations: Injustice League; Secret Society of Super Villains; Rogues; Legion of Zoom
- Abilities: Object possession In asphalt form: Superhuman strength and durability Malleability; Ability to trap people inside his body

Tar Pit (Joseph "Joey" V. Monteleone) is a supervillain in the DC Comics universe, primarily as an enemy of the Flash (Wally West). Created by Geoff Johns and Scott Kolins, the character first appeared in The Flash (vol. 2) #174 (July 2001).

Tar Pit made his live-action debut on the second season of the Arrowverse series The Flash, portrayed by Marco Grazzini. Josh Chambers portrayed the character in the ninth season.

== Fictional character biography ==
The younger brother of drug lord Jack Monteleone, Joey Monteleone was arrested for armed robbery. While serving time at Iron Heights Penitentiary, Joey discovered he was a metahuman with the ability to inhabit inanimate objects. Eventually, he became trapped in the form of anthropomorphic asphalt, while his real body remains unconscious in Iron Heights.

In Infinite Crisis, Tar Pit joins the Secret Society of Super Villains. He later joins the Injustice League and is one of the villains featured in Salvation Run, where he is exiled to the planet Cygnus 4017.

In the Blackest Night crossover, Tar Pit accompanies Owen Mercer in searching for his father George Harkness, who was resurrected as a Black Lantern. Tar Pit reasons that he will be of no interest to the Black Lanterns as his tar-based form has no heart for them to take.

In "The New 52", Tar Pit is shown about to attack Iris West following her defeating Folded Man when Flash appears. He thaws out the guards and sends the melted ice towards the villains.

During the "Forever Evil" storyline, Tar Pit is among the villains driven out of Central City by Gorilla Grodd at the time when the Crime Syndicate of America supposedly killed the Justice League. This led to Tar Pit joining up with the Secret Society of Super Villains as he is sent to deal with the rebellion of the Rogues. He and many other villains were sucked into the Mirror World by Mirror Master.

On the night before Christmas, Tar Pit's nephew and niece were kidnapped by criminals. Tar Pit had to rob a toy store to pay their ransom only to be defeated by Kid Flash. As Tar Pit is taken to Iron Heights, Kid Flash rescued the children and defeated the criminals.

== Powers and abilities ==
Tar Pit's body is made of molten asphalt and burns on touch. He is able to trap people in the substance of his body and can hurl flaming chunks of tar at his enemies. Due to his body being made of tar, Tar Pit is practically invulnerable.

Before becoming Tar Pit, Joey was able to project his consciousness into inanimate objects and animate them.

== Other versions ==
An alternate timeline variant of Tar Pit appears in the Flashpoint tie-in Flashpoint: Citizen Cold. Initially imprisoned in Iron Heights Penitentiary, he joins Mirror Master's Rogues and breaks out of prison to pursue revenge against Citizen Cold for seemingly stealing his family's money, only to be killed by him.

== In other media ==
- Tar Pit appears in The Flash, portrayed by Marco Grazzini in the second season and Josh Chambers in the ninth season. This version was pushed into a tar pit amidst the explosion of S.T.A.R. Labs' particle accelerator. After being freed by workers two years later, he gains the ability to transform into molten tar.
- Tar Pit appears as a character summon in Scribblenauts Unmasked: A DC Comics Adventure.
- Tar Pit appears in The Flash: The Fastest Man Alive #2.
