= Rogues (comics) =

Fictional group of supervillains appearing in DC Comics

- The Rogues as depicted in The Flash: Iron Heights (August 2001).

Publication information
- Publisher: DC Comics
- First appearance: The Flash #155 (September 1965)
- Created by: John Broome; Carmine Infantino

In-story information
- Member(s): Membership

The Rogues are a group of supervillains of the Flash, appearing in American comic books published by DC Comics. Known members throughout its incarnation are Captain Cold, Abra Kadabra, Mirror Master, Heat Wave, the Golden Glider, the Weather Wizard, the Trickster, the Pied Piper, the Top, and Captain Boomerang. This loose criminal association refers to themselves as the "Rogues", disdaining the use of the term "supervillain" or "supercriminal".

== Fictional team history ==
The Rogues, compared to similar collections of supervillains in the DC Universe, are an unusually social group, maintaining a code of conduct as well as high standards for acceptance. No Rogue may inherit another Rogue's identity while the original is still alive. Simply acquiring a former Rogue's costume, gear, or abilities is not sufficient to become a Rogue, even if the previous Rogue is already dead. The Rogues do not use drugs and refuse to kill unless it is necessary and rarely have ambitions beyond robberies.

The enemies of the Flash started to use the name the Rogues during the Silver Age of Comics. Originally, the Rogues were just the Flash's enemies teaming together after they were all broken out of jail by another Flash foe, the super-intelligent gorilla Gorilla Grodd, to distract the Flash during Grodd's latest attempt at world conquest. After their defeat by the Flash, they formed a lasting group, and usually a Rogue will never commit a crime by himself. The Silver Age Flash enemies who became Rogues were Captain Cold, Mirror Master, Heat Wave, Weather Wizard, Trickster, Pied Piper, Top, Captain Boomerang, Golden Glider and later, Rainbow Raider.

In the Modern Age, the graphic novel The Flash: Iron Heights introduced new characters, many of whom would later become a new band of Rogues under the leadership of Blacksmith. Some writers revamped classic Rogues, reinventing them through stories such as Underworld Unleashed, the Rogue War, or solo stories, while others reinvented a Rogue through new characters inheriting the identities.

=== The New 52: The Flash and Forever Evil (2011–2016) ===
The Rogues are referenced by Barry Allen to have previously been defeated by him and disbanded. Known members (so far) have been the Golden Glider, the Weather Wizard, Heat Wave, and the Mirror Master.

The Rogues appeared in The Flash (vol. 4) Annual #1 in a war against Captain Cold, the Flash, and the Pied Piper. Confirmed Rogues include the Golden Glider (Lisa Snart) as the current leader, the Weather Wizard (Marco Mardon), the Trickster (Axel Walker), Heat Wave (Mick Rory), and the Mirror Master (Sam Scudder).

A year prior, Captain Cold, Heat Wave, the Mirror Master, and the Weather Wizard underwent a procedure at an unknown facility that would merge them with their weapons, giving them superpowers. The procedure went awry and exploded. Cold's sister Lisa, who was also at the facility, was caught in the explosion. The five were given superpowers, but each in a twisted manner. Heat Wave gained pyrokinesis, but at the cost of his body being burned; the Weather Wizard became emotionally tied to his weather wand, causing constant depression; Lisa became an astral projection; and Mirror Master was trapped in the Mirror World. The Rogues blamed Cold for this and turned against him. However, they are forced to team up with the Flash, Cold, and the Pied Piper when Gorilla Grodd invades Central City. As of Forever Evil, they seem to be working together again.

== Membership ==
=== Silver Age Flash enemies ===
Villain	First appearance	Description
Captain Cold	Showcase #8 (May/June 1957)	Leonard Snart is a criminal who wanted a chance to get rid of the Flash and created a gun capable of freezing anything to absolute zero. He is considered to be the nemesis of both Barry Allen and Wally West, and the leader of the Rogues. Known for being a sympathetic villain, Captain Cold has a sense of honor and strict rules on how the Rogues should act, such as a rule against drugs and killing.
Mirror Master	The Flash #105 (February/March 1959)	While working in a prison workshop, Samuel Scudder accidentally created a mirror that could hold an image for a period of time. When he escaped, he made more mirror gadgets and became the Mirror Master. Mirror Master was killed during Crisis on Infinite Earths, though two other villains have taken his title.
Gorilla Grodd	The Flash #106 (April/May 1959)	Gorilla Grodd is a hyper-intelligent telepathic gorilla able to control the minds of others. He was a normal gorilla until an alien spacecraft (retconned from a radioactive meteor, which also empowered Hector Hammond) crashed in his African home. Grodd and his troop were imbued with superhuman intelligence by the ship's pilot. Grodd and fellow gorilla Solovar also developed telepathic and telekinetic powers.
Pied Piper	The Flash #106 (April/May 1959)	Hartley Rathaway was born deaf, but was cured after his rich parents sought a way to make him hear. Once he could hear, he became obsessed with music and sound, and made many sound-based weapons. Originally a criminal, the Pied Piper reformed and became a friend of Wally West. Around the same time, he came out as gay.
Weather Wizard	The Flash #110 (December 1959/January 1960)	Mark Mardon is a prison escapee whose brother was killed in a fight with him; it is left ambiguous as to whether he was responsible for his brother's death. Mardon stole a wand his brother created, which could control the weather, and used it to become a criminal.
Trickster	The Flash #113 (June/July 1960)	James Jesse, a circus performer coming from a family of trapeze walkers, invented shoes that used compressed air to "walk" on air, enabling him to become a successful aerialist. Inspired by Jesse James, James made other weapons and became the Trickster.
Captain Boomerang	The Flash #117 (December 1960)	George "Digger" Harkness was a master of boomerangs, which he learned how to use in the Outback. When a mascot was needed for a boomerang company, Harkness was hired, but used the costume and boomerangs to commit crimes. Had many trick boomerangs. He briefly became the second Mirror Master after the death of the original. During the Identity Crisis miniseries, he was sent to murder Jack Drake, with the two killing each other. Harkness has a son, Owen Mercer, who became the second Captain Boomerang and briefly worked in the Rogues. Harkness was resurrected following the events of Blackest Night.
Top	The Flash #122 (August 1961)	Roscoe Dillon used many top-themed weapons to commit crimes, eventually learning how to spin himself at great speeds, which increased his intelligence and enabled him to dodge bullets. He died, but his mind was so powerful that it took over the minds of many people to keep living, including Henry Allen and Senator Thomas O'Neill, whose body was reformed by Dillon to resemble his original body. The Top was later killed again by Captain Cold when Dillon tried to take over the Rogues. During this time, it was revealed that Dillon had made some of the Rogues reform with his mental influence, and during the war, he undid it, making them criminals again. The Top was resurrected following The New 52 reboot.
Abra Kadabra	The Flash #128 (February 1962)	Abra Kadabra is from the 64th century, at a time when science has made stage magic obsolete. However, he wants a career as a performing magician, so after he was exiled back in time he finds an audience to entertain and soon clashes with the Flash (Barry Allen). Kadabra wields futuristic technology that is so advanced that it appears to be magic. Kadabra later sold his soul to the demon Neron in exchange for true magical powers.
Heat Wave	The Flash #140 (November 1963)	Mick Rory is obsessed with fire and at a young age burned down his house, killing his family. He then made a heat gun and used fire to rob and kill. He was one of the Rogues that the Top forced to reform, and when that was undone, he became a Rogue again. Even during his reform, his mind was already starting to turn to crime.
Golden Glider	The Flash #250 (June 1977)	Lisa Snart, the younger sister of Len Snart (Captain Cold), did not want to be a villain. When her lover, the Top, died, she swore revenge on the Flash. Using sharp ice skates that made ice, she battled the Flash and got the approval of her brother. She was killed by Chillblaine, a villain to whom she had given one of Captain Cold's weapons. Golden Glider was resurrected following The New 52 reboot.
Rainbow Raider	The Flash #286 (June 1980)	Roy G. Bivolo dreamed of being an artist, but was colorblind. His dying father tried to find a cure, but instead gave him a pair of glasses that could create rainbow-colored light. Bivolo decided to turn to a life of crime and was a late addition to the Rogues. He died during the Blackest Night storyline, only to be resurrected. In The New 52, he went by the name of Chroma.

=== Modern Age Flash enemies ===
Villain	First appearance	Description
Mirror Master	Animal Man #8 (February 1989)	Evan McCulloch grew up in an orphanage, and after killing a bully, he escaped and became a mercenary. He was hired by government agents to become the third Mirror Master, receiving the original Mirror Master's costume and equipment. McCulloch ran with the equipment, becoming a criminal; then soon after, a member of the Rogues. He frequently deals drugs within the supervillain community and harbors his own cocaine addiction, both of which are a source of conflict with Captain Cold.
Double Down	The Flash: Iron Heights (August 2001)	Jeremy Tell lost a card game and then killed the man who won. After this, the cards in the dead man's pocket flew out and covered Tell, becoming his skin. He can mentally control the deck, sending cards flying and slicing at victims with razor-sharp edges.
Tar Pit	The Flash (vol. 2) #174 (July 2001)	Joey Monteleone was the brother of a drug lord, Jack Monteleone. While in prison, he discovered he could project his mind into inanimate objects. However, his mind became stuck inside a mass of tar.
Trickster	The Flash (vol. 2) #184 (April 2002)	After the original Trickster reformed, teenager Axel Walker found his equipment and stole it, becoming the second Trickster. He joined the Rogues, and took the place of the original Trickster. During the Rogue War, the original Trickster took back what was his. Since the death of James Jesse, Walker has tried once again to take on the Trickster title and his place among Captain Cold's Rogues.
Captain Boomerang	Identity Crisis #3 (October 2004)	Owen Mercer is the son of the original Captain Boomerang, but did not know his father's identity until he was an adult. The two practiced together, and were surprised when Mercer found he had bursts of super-speed. When his father died, he was invited to join the Rogues, but later left for stints with the Outsiders and the Suicide Squad.

=== Blacksmith's Rogues ===
Villain	First appearance	Description
Magenta	The New Teen Titans #17 (March 1982)	Frankie Kane is a one-time girlfriend of Wally West and gained magnetic powers which killed her family. Not knowing her purpose in life, she became a villain and first joined the Cicada cult and the New Rogues before reforming.
Plunder	The Flash (vol. 2) #165 (October 2000)	Plunder is an assassin from a mirror universe and a counterpart of police officer Jared Morillo.
Girder	The Flash: Iron Heights (August 2001)	Tony Woodward was shoved into a vat of steel after he assaulted a female co-worker. He survived, emerging with a body made of scrap metal. He joined the New Rogues, and took part in the Rogue War.
Murmur	The Flash: Iron Heights (August 2001)	A surgeon who went insane, Michael Amar now seeks sadistic ways to kill the voices he hears. His distinctive criminal act is to remove a victim's tongue early during the torture he inflicts. He also has a virus called Frenzy that will turn a person's lungs to mud in 90 minutes.

== Related teams ==
=== The New Rogues ===
The New Rogues appear in "Gotham Underground", formed and led by the Penguin and consisting of Chill, the Mirror Man, Mr. Magic, and the Weather Witch. Additionally, Dick Grayson works undercover within the group as Freddie Dinardo / Burn. The New Rogues reappear in Final Crisis: Rogues' Revenge, with Libra recruiting them and a new Burn to help him force the original Rogues to join the Secret Society. After capturing Captain Cold's father, the Rogues kill the New Rogues.

=== The Renegades ===
A futuristic iteration of the Rogues called the Renegades are police officers and members of the "Reverse-Flash Task Force" from the 25th century. They are led by Commander Cold and consist of Heatstroke, Mirror Monarch, Weather Warlock, Trixster, and the Top.

== Collected editions ==
#	Title	Material collected	Pages	Publication date	ISBN
Paperback
1	The Flash: Rogues - Captain Cold	Showcase #8; The Flash #150 and 297, The Flash (vol. 2) #28 and 182, Flashpoint: Citizen Cold #1, The Flash (vol. 4) #6 and The Flash (vol. 5) #17	160	August 22, 2018	978-1401281595
2	The Flash: Rogues - Reverse-Flash		168		

== Other versions ==
- An alternate timeline iteration of the Rogues appear in the Flashpoint tie-in Flashpoint: Citizen Cold, led by Mirror Master and consisting of Weather Wizard, Tar Pit, and Fallout. Additionally, the Trixter serves as a double agent working to sabotage them on behalf of their enemy Citizen Cold.
- An alternate universe iteration of the Rogues appears in Absolute Flash. This version of the group is a private-ops unit equipped with experimental weapons created by a government program called Project Olympus, led by Captain Leonard Snart, and consists of Sergeant Lisa Snart / Glider, Captain Digger Harkness / Captain Boomerang, and Corporal Jesse James / Trickster. All four are former US Army soldiers who were dishonorably discharged for taking bribes from a foreign government before being approached by Project Olympus to work for them instead of going to prison. After being tasked with capturing Wally West, they opt to help him instead.

== In other media ==
=== Television ===
- The Rogues appear in the Justice League Unlimited episode "Flash and Substance", consisting of Captain Cold, Mirror Master, Captain Boomerang, and the Trickster.
- The Rogues appear in the Batman: The Brave and the Bold episode "Requiem for a Scarlet Speedster!", consisting of Captain Cold, Heat Wave, and Weather Wizard.
- Several incarnations of the Rogues appear in The Flash.
  - The first incarnation appears in the first and second seasons, consisting of Captain Cold, Heat Wave, and Golden Glider.
  - In the fifth season, Silver Ghost intends to form the Young Rogues and recruits Weather Witch. However, the latter abandons her in Bolivia and forms the Young Rogues with Bug-Eyed Bandit, Rag Doll, and XS.
  - The second incarnation appears in the ninth season, formed by the Red Death and consisting of Captain Boomerang, Fiddler, Murmur, Rainbow Raider, and Gorilla Grodd. This version of the group wields equipment based on Wayne Enterprises designs.
    - Additionally, the Flash forms his own Rogues in the hopes of reforming them and combating the Red Death; recruiting Pied Piper, Goldface, Hotness, and Chillblaine. Though Chillblaine temporarily defects to the Red Death, the Flash appeals to his better nature.

=== Film ===
The Rogues appear in Justice League: The Flashpoint Paradox, consisting of Captain Cold, Heat Wave, Captain Boomerang, the Top, and Mirror Master.

=== Video games ===
- The Rogues appear as bosses in Batman: The Brave and the Bold – The Videogame, consisting of Captain Cold, Heat Wave, and Weather Wizard.
- The Rogues appear as sub-bosses in DC Universe Online.
- The Rogues appear in Lego DC Super-Villains, consisting of Captain Cold, Heat Wave, Mirror Master, and Captain Boomerang. This version of the group are members of the Legion of Doom.

=== Miscellaneous ===
The Rogues appear in the Injustice: Gods Among Us prequel comic, led by Mirror Master and consisting of Golden Glider, Heat Wave, and Weather Wizard. Additionally, Captain Cold is said to be in hiding while Trickster appears as a former member. The Rogues are initially incarcerated until Plastic Man breaks them out to help Batman's Insurgency defeat Superman and his Regime. Despite their being criminals, Batman accepts them because they also follow a no-kill rule. Throughout their time with the Insurgency, the Rogues carry out attacks on Regime bases until they are attacked by Bizarro, who kills Heat Wave and Weather Wizard.
