= Justice League: The Flashpoint Paradox =

2013 American animated film directed by Jay Oliva

- Home video release cover art
- Directed by: Jay Oliva
- Written by: Jim Krieg
- Based on: Flashpoint by: Geoff Johns; Andy Kubert
- Produced by: James Tucker
- Starring: Justin Chambers; C. Thomas Howell; Michael B. Jordan; Kevin McKidd; Cary Elwes
- Edited by: Christopher D. Lozinski
- Music by: Frederik Wiedmann
- Production companies: Warner Premiere; DC Entertainment; Warner Bros. Animation; Studio 4°C
- Distributed by: Warner Home Video
- Release date: July 30, 2013
- Running time: 81 minutes
- Country: United States
- Language: English

Justice League: The Flashpoint Paradox is a 2013 American anime-styled animated superhero film directed by Jay Oliva and written by Jim Krieg. It is an adaptation of the 2011 comic book crossover "Flashpoint" by Geoff Johns and Andy Kubert. The film stars Justin Chambers as Barry Allen / Flash, C. Thomas Howell as Eobard Thawne / Professor Zoom, Michael B. Jordan as Victor Stone / Cyborg, Kevin McKidd as Thomas Wayne / Batman and Cary Elwes as Orin / Arthur Curry / Aquaman. The film also sees actors reprising roles from other DC animated series, including Kevin Conroy as Bruce Wayne / Batman, Nathan Fillion as Hal Jordan / Green Lantern, Ron Perlman as Slade Wilson / Deathstroke, Dana Delany as Lois Lane, Vanessa Marshall as Princess Diana / Wonder Woman and Dee Bradley Baker as Etrigan the Demon.

It is the 18th film of the DC Universe Animated Original Movies and the first film of the DC Animated Movie Universe.

Justice League: The Flashpoint Paradox was released on July 30, 2013, and was re-released on September 10 as a 2-disc special edition.

== Plot ==
While visiting the grave of his mother Nora Allen, Barry Allen, known as the Flash, is alerted to a break-in by Captain Cold, Heat Wave, Mirror Master, Captain Boomerang, and Top at the Flash Museum. While battling the rogues, he discovers they were hired by his arch-enemy Professor Zoom as part of a plan to destroy Central City. With the help of the Justice League, Zoom's plot is thwarted. While being taken to prison, Zoom taunts Flash over the death of his mother.

The next day, Barry discovers the world has changed: his powers are gone, his mother is alive, his wife Iris is married to someone else and has a daughter with him, and the Justice League no longer exists. Aquaman and his Atlantean forces have sunk Western Europe under the ocean, while Wonder Woman has led the Amazons in conquering Great Britain. Both forces have been at war since an alliance between them collapsed after Wonder Woman killed Aquaman's wife Mera, who had confronted Wonder Woman for having an affair with Aquaman. Cyborg has assembled a team to eliminate both parties and approaches Batman to join them, but his refusal leads the government to scrap the plan and instead recruit pilot Hal Jordan to fly an alien spacecraft to bomb the Atlanteans.

Barry visits the Batcave, but is attacked by Batman, whom he realizes is not Bruce Wayne but his father Thomas. Thomas explains that Bruce was killed in an attack on the street when they were out together as a family, which inspired Thomas to become Batman, while Bruce's mother Martha went mad with grief and became The Joker. Attempting to explain the situation to Batman, Barry tries to reveal his Flash costume, but the costume in his ring turns out to be Professor Zoom's, causing Barry to believe Zoom is responsible for the timeline alteration. Convinced of Barry's good intentions, Batman helps him to recreate the electrical accident that gave him his powers, but the attempt fails, and Barry is severely burned.

In London, Colonel Steve Trevor attempts to extricate reporter Lois Lane, but is discovered by the Amazons and is killed. The Amazons hunt down Lois, who is rescued by the local resistance. Meanwhile, in the ruins of Paris, Deathstroke and Lex Luthor are attacked and killed by Aquaman's forces while tracking the energy trail of Aquaman's new superweapon, powered by a captive Captain Atom. At the Batcave, after realizing his memories are changing, Barry asks Batman to recreate the accident. This second attempt is successful. Barry regains most of his powers but cannot travel through time because Zoom is also using the Speed Force.

Barry attempts to recruit more allies, beginning with Superman, who was imprisoned in a U.S. government facility after his Kryptonian ship crash-landed in Metropolis. With the aid of Batman and Cyborg, they liberate an emaciated Superman, who, after being empowered by Earth's yellow sun, fends off the facility's security before fleeing in fear and confusion. Barry collapses as his memories continue to change and is taken to Billy Batson's home to recuperate. There, he learns that Hal's attack has failed, and the final battle between Amazons and Atlanteans has begun.

After Billy is convinced to return as Shazam, Barry convinces the other superheroes to help stop the war, and they depart for Britain aboard Batman's jet, only to be shot down upon arrival. Billy and his siblings combine into Captain Thunder to fight Wonder Woman, while Barry, Cyborg, and Batman occupy Aquaman. Zoom reveals himself and viciously beats Barry. He explains that Barry is responsible for this alternate timeline: Barry traveled back in time to save his mother, fracturing reality. Wonder Woman uses her lasso to force Captain Thunder to de-transform and kills Billy.

Superman returns, but arrives too late to save Cyborg from Aquaman, who remotely detonates his Captain Atom-powered weapon after Wonder Woman overpowers him. As the explosion tears across the horizon, Batman "kills" Zoom. The dying Batman urges Barry to run and gives him a letter addressed to Bruce. No longer limited by Zoom's use of the Speed Force, Barry races back in time, stops his earlier self, fractures time, and creates a new timeline. Barry awakens at his desk and finds that reality is apparently back to normal. He visits Bruce to tell him what happened and gives him the letter. Bruce thanks him before Barry runs off.

In a post-credits scene, a Boom Tube opens in space above Earth and a horde of Parademons emerges. (Note: The story continues in Justice League: War (2014).)

== Voice cast ==
- Justin Chambers as Barry Allen / The Flash
- C. Thomas Howell as Eobard Thawne / Professor Zoom
- Kevin Conroy as Bruce Wayne / Batman
- Kevin McKidd as Thomas Wayne / Batman
- Michael B. Jordan as Victor Stone / Cyborg
- Dee Bradley Baker as Etrigan the Demon (credited), Top (uncredited), Canterbury Cricket (uncredited)
- Steve Blum as Lex Luthor (credited), Captain Thunder (uncredited)
- Sam Daly as Clark Kent / Kal-El / Superman
- Dana Delany as Lois Lane
- Cary Elwes as Orin / Arthur Curry / Aquaman
- Nathan Fillion as Hal Jordan / Green Lantern
- Grey DeLisle-Griffin as Nora Allen (credited), Young Barry Allen (uncredited), Martha Wayne / Joker (uncredited)
- Jennifer Hale as Iris West (credited), Billy Batson (uncredited)
- Danny Huston as General Sam Lane
- Danny Jacobs as Cole Cash / Grifter (credited), Leonard Snart / Captain Cold (uncredited)
- Peter Jessop as Nuidis Vulko
- Lex Lang as Nathaniel Adam / Captain Atom (credited), Funeral Presider (uncredited)
- Vanessa Marshall as Princess Diana / Wonder Woman
- Candi Milo as Persephone (credited), Pedro Pena (uncredited)
- Ron Perlman as Slade Wilson / Deathstroke
- Kevin Michael Richardson as President Barack Obama (credited), James Forrest (uncredited)
- Andrea Romano as Doris (credited), Central City Newsreader (uncredited)
- James Patrick Stuart as Steve Trevor (credited), George "Digger" Harkness / Captain Boomerang (uncredited), Orm Marius / Ocean Master (uncredited)
- Hynden Walch as Yo-Yo

== Soundtrack ==
Justice League: The Flashpoint Paradox (Soundtrack from the DC Universe Animated Original Movie)

Film score by Frederik Wiedmann
- Released: September 10th, 2013
- Length: 59:04
- Label: La-La Land Records

The soundtrack to Justice League: The Flashpoint Paradox was released on September 10, 2013. The music was composed by Frederik Wiedmann.

Justice League: The Flashpoint Paradox (Soundtrack from the DC Universe Animated Original Movie)
No.	Title	Length
1.	"The Incident"	2:18
2.	"Rogue"	2:03
3.	"Justice League"	3:47
4.	"Mother"	1:08
5.	"Sin City"	2:32
6.	"The Beginning of the End"	1:06
7.	"Inside the Batcave"	1:44
8.	"Chased by Amazons"	2:17
9.	"Atlantian War"	3:53
10.	"Recreation"	1:22
11.	"Redux"	3:11
12.	"Flash Reborn"	1:05
13.	"A Darker Past"	1:26
14.	"Hal Jordan"	1:48
15.	"Superman"	1:31
16.	"Faster Than Bullets"	1:56
17.	"The Mission of a Soldier"	1:35
18.	"Aquaman's Army"	1:05
19.	"Worlds Collide"	1:29
20.	"Aquaman vs. Wonder Woman"	1:36
21.	"Thawne's Play"	4:01
22.	"I Changed Something"	2:09
23.	"The Fallen"	2:37
24.	"The Blood of Hope"	1:51
25.	"Last Man Standing"	3:14
26.	"Hell of a Messenger"	4:01
27.	"This Is Classified"	1:44
28.	"Lost Family"	0:36
Total length:		59:04

== Reception ==
=== Critical reception ===
The review aggregator Rotten Tomatoes reported an approval rating of 100%, with an average score of 7.3, based on 6 reviews.

IGN gave a Justice League: The Flashpoint Paradox 8.5/10, and said it has outdone its source material. It called the style "sleek and hard-hitting", praised C. Thomas Howell's voice acting which it said brought "unnerving dread", and stated that it is the "most hardcore DC animated movie to date", although it also warns against the level of violence and said that the numerous cameos "detract from the main story".

=== Sales ===
The film earned $5,263,980 from domestic home video sales.

== DC Animated Movie Universe ==
The post-credits scene in Justice League: The Flashpoint Paradox sets up the film Justice League: War which officially began the DC Animated Movie Universe. A plot point towards the end of the film is also revisited and expanded in Suicide Squad: Hell to Pay, which also belongs to the DC Animated Movie Universe continuity. It is also revisited in the final film Justice League Dark: Apokolips War of this continuity when John Constantine looks into Barry Allen's mind after freeing him from Darkseid's slavery.

== See also ==
- List of DC Multiverse worlds
