= Mirror Master =

DC Comics supervillain, specifically of the Flash

- The Sam Scudder incarnation of Mirror Master as depicted in The Flash #136 (May 1963). Art by Carmine Infantino.

Publication information
- Publisher: DC Comics
- First appearance: Scudder: The Flash #105 (March 1959); McCulloch: Animal Man #8 (February 1989)
- Created by: Scudder: John Broome; Carmine Infantino; McCulloch: Grant Morrison; Chas Truog

In-story information
- Alter ego: Samuel Joseph Scudder; George "Digger" Harkness; Evan McCulloch
- Species: Metahuman
- Team affiliations: Rogues; Secret Society of Super Villains; Injustice Gang; Suicide Squad; Legion of Doom
- Abilities: Various powers over mirrors, including the ability to travel through them and trap others within them; Glass transmutation

Mirror Master is the name of several supervillains appearing in American comic books published by DC Comics. He is a recurring foe of the Flash with considerable technical expertise and skills involving the use of mirrors. Three individuals have donned the guise of Mirror Master, and have been members of the Rogues. In 2009, Mirror Master was ranked as IGN's 79th Greatest Comic Book Villain of All Time.

Both incarnations of Mirror Master have made several appearances in DC-related media, with Sam Scudder being portrayed in live-action by David Cassidy in the 1990 The Flash series and by Grey Damon in the 2014 The Flash series, while Efrat Dor portrayed a gender-swapped version of Evan McCulloch, named Evan McCulloch, in the 2014 series.

== Publication history ==
The Sam Scudder version of Mirror Master first appeared in The Flash #105, and was created by John Broome and Carmine Infantino.

The Evan McCulloch version of Mirror Master first appeared in Animal Man #8, and was created by Grant Morrison and Chas Truog.

== Fictional character biography ==
=== Sam Scudder ===
Mirror Master (Scudder) in his first appearance. Cover of The Flash vol. 1, #105 (Feb.-March 1959 DC Comics), art by Carmine Infantino, pencils, and Joe Giella, inks

Samuel Joseph Scudder is a simple convict, but has the goal to learn how to get inside the reflection of a mirror. Stumbling into a hall of mirrors, he experiments and discovers a way to get in his own reflection. He uses this power to become the criminal Mirror Master, and is a frequent foe of the Flash. Scudder is killed around the same time as Barry Allen, alongside Icicle, during Crisis on Infinite Earths.

In the Blackest Night crossover event, Sam Scudder is reanimated as an undead Black Lantern during the Blackest Night and is preparing an attack on the Rogues with the other deceased members, who are also reanimated.

In The New 52, a 2011 reboot of the DC Comics universe, Sam Scudder is the current Mirror Master. It is revealed that a year prior he, Captain Cold, Heat Wave, and Weather Wizard underwent a procedure at an unknown facility that would merge them with their weapons, giving them superpowers. The procedure went awry, causing an explosion at the facility. Golden Glider, who was also at the facility, was caught in the explosion. The five were given superpowers but each in a twisted manner. Heat Wave gains pyrokinesis but at the cost of his body being burned, Weather Wizard becomes emotionally tied to his weather wand causing constant depression, Mirror Master is trapped in Mirror World, and Golden Glider becomes an astral projection of herself. It is implied that Mirror Master is in a romantic relationship with her. The Rogues blame Cold for this and have turned against him because of it.

=== Evan McCulloch ===
Scottish mercenary Evan McCulloch was left as a baby on the doorstep of an orphanage run by Mrs. McCulloch, with nothing but his first name and a photograph of his parents. He grows up fairly normal and around age 8, McCulloch is sexually assaulted by an older boy. McCulloch drowns the boy in a creek in self-defense, and eventually leaves the orphanage at age 16.

He settles in Glasgow, taking up a life that leads to crime and eventually takes up employment as an assassin. He becomes one of the most renowned mercenaries in the United Kingdom. One day, he has two hits scheduled, and due to an eye injury is unable to make out his second target. After firing his shot, he recognizes the target as his father.

At his father's funeral, McCulloch sees his mother. He tries to work up the courage to see her, but visits her too late, discovering that she has committed suicide. Stricken with grief at the loss of both parents, McCulloch decides to turn himself in but is instead picked up by a consortium of U.S. government and big business interests, who offer him the costume and weapons of the original Mirror Master in exchange for his services.

He moves to Keystone City and comes into conflict with Wally West, the third Flash. He discovers a "Mirror Dimension" which enables him to travel through any reflective surface. In Underworld Unleashed, the Rogues accept Mirror Master as Scudder's successor. After being betrayed by Neron, Mirror Master and four of the other Rogues die and go to Hell, only to return after a confrontation between Neron and the Flash.

In "One Year Later", Mirror Master appears as a member of the new Suicide Squad. Inertia persuades Mirror Master and the Rogues to kill Bart Allen, but they are enraged after learning that they murdered a child.

In The Flash #12 (2024), Mirror Master and the Rogues work with the Arc Angles, a group of inter-dimensional entities who are poisoning the Speed Force. After the Arc Angles betray Mirror Master, he works with Barry Allen and Wally West to battle them. During the battle, Mirror Master is killed by the Arc Angles and erased from history. Mirror Master is later revealed to have survived and been transported to the Absolute Universe (AU), where he meets his AU counterpart.

== Powers and abilities ==
Both versions of Mirror Master use mirrors that produce fantastic effects such as hypnotism, invisibility, holograms, physical transformations, communications and travel into other dimensions (other parallel universes or planes of existence). Evan McCulloch uses a laser pistol unlike Sam Scudder.

== Other versions ==
- An alternate universe version of Mirror Master appears in Tangent: Superman's Reign #1. This version's body is composed of a glass-like substance and can create portals to other universes.
- An unidentified Mirror Master makes a cameo appearance in Justice League International #65 (June 1994) as a member of the "League-Busters".
- A character based on Mirror Master called Mirror Man appears in "Gotham Underground" and Final Crisis: Rogues' Revenge as a member of the New Rogues until he is killed by Mirror Master.
- An alternate timeline version of Evan McCulloch / Mirror Master appears in the Flashpoint tie-in Flashpoint: Citizen Cold. After being imprisoned in the Mirrorverse and presumed dead, he recruits Weather Wizard, Tar Pit, and Fallout to form the Rogues before breaking out to pursue revenge against Citizen Cold, only to be killed by him.
- A heroic, futuristic incarnation of Mirror Master called Mirror Monarch appears in The Flash (vol. 3) as a member of a metahuman police force called the Renegades from the 25th century.

== In other media ==
=== Television ===
==== Live-action ====
Mirror Master as seen in The Flash (1990).

- The Sam Scudder incarnation of Mirror Master appears in The Flash (1990) episode "Done with Mirrors", portrayed by David Cassidy. This version is a criminal who utilizes holograms projected by reflective disks.
- Characters based on Mirror Master appear in The Flash (2014):
  - The Sam Scudder incarnation of Mirror Master appears in the third season, portrayed by Grey Damon. This version was originally a member of Leonard Snart's gang three years prior to the series before gaining mirror-based abilities amidst the explosion of S.T.A.R. Labs' particle accelerator. This also trapped him in a mirror, where he remained until escaping in the present and freeing his partner Rosalind Dillon from Iron Heights Penitentiary so they can go on a crime spree together, though the two are defeated by the Flash and Jesse Quick. Scudder and Dillon later joined Black Hole until Mirror Monarch (see below) shatters him, revealing he was the first mirror duplicate.
  - A female character based on the Evan McCulloch incarnation of Mirror Master named Eva McCulloch, also known as Eva Carver (portrayed by Efrat Dor), appears in the sixth and seventh seasons. She is a quantum engineer, co-founder of McCulloch Technologies, and wife of its CEO Joseph Carver. She was also blasted into a mirror and became a mirror doppelgänger when S.T.A.R. Labs' particle accelerator exploded, though she was trapped for six years. After learning Carver stole her technology and used it to create Black Hole, McCulloch developed and honed her newfound mirror-based abilities to get revenge. During her sixth year in the mirrorverse, McCulloch traps several key figures with her and uses mirror duplicates of them to procure technology and eventually escape the mirrorverse. Upon doing so, she kills Carver and retakes her company. After attacking Black Hole's remnants, shattering Scudder's mirror duplicate, discovering her true nature, and the Flash leaking it to the public, McCulloch goes berserk, takes the name "Mirror Monarch", and attempts to replace everyone in Central City with mirror duplicates until the Flash and Iris West-Allen convince her to stand down. Due to her duplicates having grown too powerful, the three destroy them before McCulloch releases her prisoners and returns to the mirrorverse to start anew.

==== Animation ====
- The Sam Scudder incarnation of Mirror Master appears in the Super Friends: The Legendary Super Powers Show episode "Reflections in Crime", voiced by George DiCenzo.
- The Evan McCulloch incarnation of Mirror Master appears in series set in the DC Animated Universe (DCAU), voiced by Alexis Denisof. This version is a small-time criminal. After making minor appearances in Justice League, he appears in Justice League Unlimited as a member of the Rogues and Gorilla Grodd's Secret Society.
- The Sam Scudder incarnation of Mirror Master appears in The Batman episode "A Mirror Darkly", voiced by John Larroquette. This version is a brilliant but mad optical physicist who is assisted by Smoke (voiced by Amanda Anka).
- The Evan McCulloch incarnation of Mirror Master appears in Batman: The Brave and the Bold, voiced by Tom Kenny.
- An unidentified incarnation of Mirror Master appears in the Robot Chicken DC Comics Special, voiced by Breckin Meyer. This version is a member of the Legion of Doom.

=== Film ===
- The Sam Scudder incarnation of Mirror Master appears in Justice League: Doom, voiced again by Alexis Denisof. This version is a member of Vandal Savage's Legion of Doom.
- The Sam Scudder incarnation of Mirror Master makes a non-speaking appearance in Justice League: The Flashpoint Paradox as a member of the Rogues.
- The Evan McCulloch incarnation of Mirror Master appears in Injustice, voiced by Yuri Lowenthal.
- The Sam Scudder incarnation of Mirror Master appears in Justice League x RWBY: Super Heroes & Huntsmen, voiced by Troy Baker.

=== Video games ===
- The Evan McCulloch incarnation of Mirror Master appears in DC Universe Online, voiced by Brandon Young.
- The Sam Scudder and Evan McCulloch incarnations of Mirror Master appear as character summons in Scribblenauts Unmasked: A DC Comics Adventure.
- The Evan McCulloch incarnation of Mirror Master appears as a playable character in Lego DC Super-Villains, voiced by Sam Heughan. This version is a member of the Rogues and Legion of Doom.

=== Miscellaneous ===
- An unidentified incarnation of Mirror Master appears in Super Friends #23.
- The Sam Scudder incarnation of Mirror Master is referenced in the Ookla the Mok song "Stranger in the Mirror".
- The DCAU incarnation of Mirror Master appears in issue #12 of the Justice League Unlimited tie-in comic book.
- The Sam Scudder incarnation of Mirror Master appears in issue #16 of the Batman: The Brave and the Bold tie-in comic book.
- The Evan McCulloch incarnation of Mirror Master appears in the Injustice: Gods Among Us prequel comic. First appearing as the leader of a U.S. government-backed strike team, they are hired to kidnap Jonathan and Martha Kent in an attempt to make the increasingly hostile Superman stand down and stop meddling in government affairs or else they will kill the Kents. In response, the Justice League launch a manhunt for Mirror Master, eventually locating him and rescuing the Kents. Years later, Plastic Man breaks Mirror Master, among other supervillains, out of prison to help Batman's Insurgency cripple Superman's Regime. Mirror Master leads the Rogues in doing so until Bizarro kills Heat Wave and Weather Wizard, after which the surviving Rogues and the Flash hold an informal memorial service for them.
