= Scott Kolins =

American illustrator (born 1968)

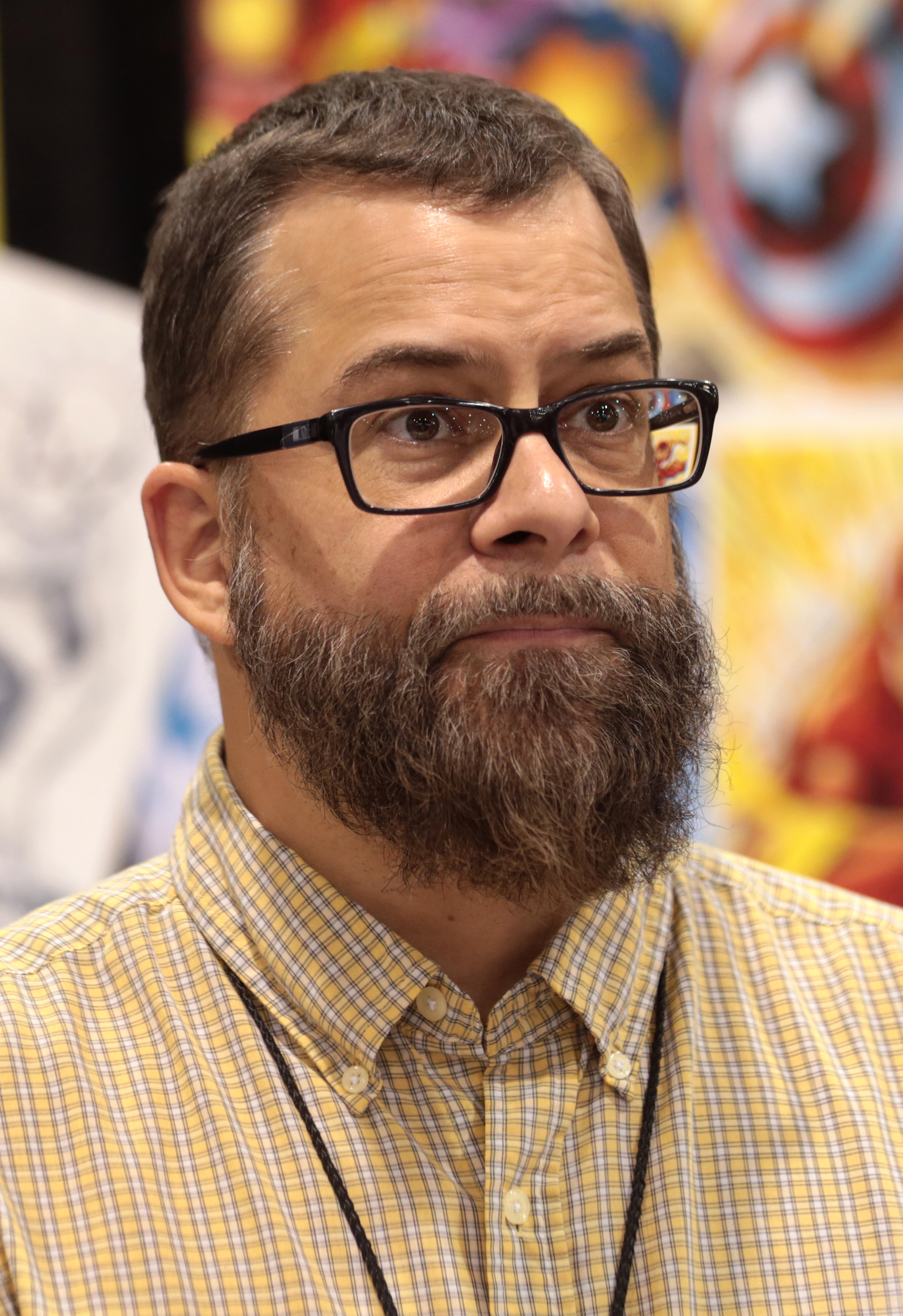
- Kolins at the 2018 Phoenix Comic Fest
- Born: 1968 (age 57–58)
- Areas: Penciller, Inker, Colourist
- Notable works: Star Wars: The Essential Guide; The Thing: Freakshow (2002); The Flash (2001–2003)
- Awards: 2003 nominee of the Wizard Fan Awards' 'Favorite Breakout Talent'

Scott Kolins (born 1968) is an American illustrator, writer, and creator of multiple different superhero and science fiction comic books. His main credits are as a penciler but he is an established inker as well as colorist and has some credits as a writer.

== Early life ==
Kolins' interest in drawing and comics began at age 10 as an avid comic book reader in the late 1970s. He studied at The Kubert School in Dover, New Jersey.

== Career ==
In the 1980s, Kolins worked under Dennis Jensen, and then under Kim DeMulder and Bart Sears. After studying at The Kubert School, Kolins got a job with Valiant Comics. He was then hired as a Romita Raider (in house art corrections under John Romita Sr.) at Marvel Comics. in 2007, Kolins announced that he was leaving Marvel and that he had been talking to Geoff Johns about a future project.

=== Style and approach ===
Most of Kolins' credits are as a penciller, following the modern tradition of "tight penciling." Since his work on The Flash, he has a tendency to do fewer shadows and less varying of line-weight. This results, in part, in shifting some of the responsibility of the page content from the penciller to the inker or colorist, resulting in fewer lines and definition by line and more by color contrasts. This tends to make the art very "clean". The whole pattern of emphasis has been the subject of discussion.

In addition to his penciling and inking work, Kolins has studied comic book coloring. He has worked over two dozen different titles, and sometimes does variation according to the demands of the story and the history of the character.

Scott Kolins was a 2003 nominee of the Wizard Fan Awards' 'Favorite Breakout Talent' for his work on The Flash.

=== Characters created ===
Kolins is also credited with the creation (or co-creation) of several comic book characters, including Peek-a-Boo, Iron Maniac, Legion of Super-Heroes member Gear, Tar Pit, and others.

== Selected bibliography ==
Kolins has illustrated numerous comic books for Marvel from 1992 to 2008, including Excalibur, Hawkeye, The Amazing Spider-Man, Thor: Blood Oath, The Thing, The Avengers, She-Hulk, Wolverine, Fantastic Four, and others. He has also illustrated many DC comics from 1993 to 2010. Kolins' works include Green Lantern, Superboy, Legion of Super-Heroes, The Flash, Wonder Woman, and Superman/Batman.
