= H'El on Earth =

Comics storyline

- Publisher: DC Comics
- Publication date: October 2012 – February 2013
- Genre: Superhero
Title(s)
Superman (vol. 3) #13–17
Superboy (vol. 3) #14–17
Superboy Annual 1 (vol. 6) #1
Supergirl (vol. 3) # 14–17
- Main character(s): Superman; Superboy; Supergirl; H'El

Creative team
- Writer(s): Scott Lobdell; Tom DeFalco; Mike Johnson
- Artist(s): Kenneth Rocafort; RB Silva; Rob Lean; Mahmud A. Asrar

"H'El on Earth" is a Superman crossover story arc published by DC Comics. Written primarily by Scott Lobdell, it details the appearance of H'El, a mysterious Kryptonian. The plot of "H'El on Earth" follows H'El's plan to restore Krypton and the Superman family's attempts to stop him.

== Plot ==
Superman returns to Metropolis after several weeks of training and quits working for the Daily Planet after realizing that Morgan Edge is manipulating articles to increase his influence. Later, Superman discovers a dragon-like alien attacking Metropolis and kills it after a lengthy battle. However, Kara Zor-El appears and tells Superman that the creature originated from Krypton. Unknown to Superman and Supergirl, the Kryptonian H'El watches them from a distance.

Meanwhile, Superboy readjusts to his life at New York City after spending time with the Ravagers. As he spends some time with Bunker, who tries to convince him to live amongst the other Titans, Superboy is attacked by H'El. As Superboy and H'El clash, Bunker calls Wonder Girl, Kid Flash, and Solstice for assistance. However, they are overpowered by H'El, who teleports away with Superboy.

Supergirl returns to her Kryptonian base, the Sanctuary, created by her father Zor-El to serve as a refuge, much like the Fortress of Solitude. Falling asleep for a while, she awakens at the surface of the Sun, with H'El standing beside her. As they return to Earth, H'El explains that he was sent to Earth by her uncle, Jor-El, before the destruction of Krypton. He offers her the chance to bring Krypton back to life.

Lois visits Clark at his apartment, where they talk about Clark's departure from the Daily Planet. In that moment, Clark receives a visit from Supergirl. Later, Superman and Supergirl go to the Metropolis Centennial Park. Supergirl reveals she has found another Kryptonian, H'El, who introduces himself to Superman. H'El tries to kill Superboy, but Superman stops him, and the two engage in a fight. Superboy and Supergirl attempt to intervene, but H'El knocks them out and leaves.

Superman brings the wounded Superboy to the Fortress of Solitude to help him recover from his injuries. With the help of Cyborg and Veritas, Superman devises a way to cure Superboy. Detaching his Kryptonian armor, Superman places it on Superboy. Both realize that the armor is the only thing keeping Superboy alive, as H’El damaged Superboy’s cellular structure. Suddenly, H’El appears and kicks Superman and Superboy out of the Fortress.

H'El brings Supergirl to the Fortress and asks her to help him in his plan to save Krypton. To do that, first they need to retrieve a crystal from the bottled city of Kandor. Since H'El cannot enter Kandor, he asks Supergirl to do so. He uses his powers to transport Supergirl to Kandor. After she retrieves the crystal, Supergirl returns to the Fortress.

Seeking for a way to stop H'El, Superman and Superboy travel to the prison holding Lex Luthor. Luthor reveals that H'El wants to travel back in time to prevent Krypton's destruction. To do so, he plans to use a special machine to absorb the sun's energy, which will devastate the solar system. Luthor taunts Superman with the fact that the only way to stop H'El is by killing him, which is something he will never do. As Superman and Superboy leave the prison, Superman calls in the Justice League to help take back the Fortress.

The Justice League attacks the Fortress and Superman informs that they can stop H'El using Kryptonite stored in the Fortress. H'El sends security robots against the League while Superboy and Batman arrive to the hangar bay, where the shard is located. However, H'El has already stolen the shard and manages to complete his machine.

After taking a hit from H'El, Superman is launched to Earth's orbit. There, he meets the Oracle, a cosmic entity who gives him a vision of H'El's plan succeeding. As the Oracle disappears, Superman returns to Earth and continues fighting H'El. Superboy destroys H'El's machine, while Supergirl stabs H'El with Kryptonite. As H'El disappears into a time portal, Supergirl falls ill from Kryptonite poisoning and Superman takes her to the Fortress to heal. In the epilogue, a few years before Krypton's destruction, a young Jor-El finds an injured H'El in a cave.

== Titles ==
- Superman Vol. 3 #13–17
- Superboy Vol. 6 #14–17 (Superboy Annual #1)
- Supergirl Vol. 6 #14–17

== "Krypton Returns" ==
"Krypton Returns"
- Publisher: DC Comics
- Publication date: October – November 2013
- Genre: Superhero
Title(s)
Action Comics Annual #2
Superman (vol. 3) #23.3 25
Superboy (vol. 6) #25
Supergirl (vol. 6) #25
- Main character(s): Superman; Superboy; Supergirl

Creative team
- Writer(s): Scott Lobdell, Justin Jordan, Michael Alan Nelson
- Artist(s): Kenneth Rocafort, Dan Jurgens, Norm Rapmund, Robson Rocha, Paulo Siqueira

"Krypton Returns" is a story arc that follows the events of H'El on Earth. Written by Lobdell, the story arc begins in Action Comics Annual #2 and continues through the November issues Superboy #25, Supergirl #25, Superman #25.

After the events of H'El on Earth, H'El has been sent to the time period of Krypton's destruction and plans to change history, so Superman and his allies travel to the past in order to stop him. Krypton Returns was also linked into Lobdell's run in Teen Titans and Superman #23.3, which featured H'El in the Forever Evil event.

=== Backstory ===
After the events of "H'El on Earth", H'El was returned to Krypton's past and fell into a coma. After finding H'El, Jor-El had been running experiments on him so that he could prove Krypton was about to be destroyed. H'El's mind manifests through the astral plane and he sees Jor-El talking with his friend, a young soldier named Zod, about his plans to evacuate Krypton's population to a planet where its sun's radiation could give them special powers. To do that, Jor-El wants to send an uncrewed spacecraft named "House of El", equipped with genetic material collected from all of Krypton's history. H'El realizes he was created from the genetic material in the ship and wakes up from his coma, killing Jor-El and Zod. After launching the ship and ensuring his own creation, H'El decides to take over Krypton.

=== Summary ===
Superman, Superboy and Supergirl meet up in space and discover Krypton has mysteriously returned to life. The Oracle and his servant Faora explain to them that H'El has taken over Krypton and enslaved the population. He has also been travelling across time in order to save Krypton from destruction, but his travels have caused damage to the timeline. If they do not stop him, the temporal distortions he caused will destroy the universe. They each travel to different points in Krypton's history to systematically stop H'El. Superboy travels to Argo City a week before Krypton's destruction to make sure Supergirl escapes Krypton. Supergirl travels to the age of the Great War to stop the clone rebellion from causing damage to Krypton. Superman travels to Kryptonopolis months before Krypton's explosion to stop H'El at the very moment of his success.

After getting to Argo City, Superboy meets Kara but they are attacked by the Eradicator, who wants to make sure every Kryptonian dies while Krypton explodes. After a small fight, Superboy defeats the Eradicator. As Supergirl arrives at the Great War, she attacked by clones. She defeats them but is left seriously weakened, and then, H'El encounters her, with the Kryptonite shard she impaled him with. Superman is attacked by Lara, his mother, who only stops when she sees the symbol of El in his armor.

Supergirl fights H'El in the Great War while Superboy continues protecting Kara in Argo City. As Superman watches Jor-El and Lara on Kryptonopolis, he encounters a mysterious person who knows about his travel in time. Superboy is attacked by the Eradicator again, but Superboy uses a portal opened by the Oracle to send the Eradicator to Smallville in the present. H'El also attacks Superboy on Argo City, but Superboy and Supergirl realize if H'El is injured in a timeline, he will take damage in another. The clones that attacked Supergirl earlier acknowledge her as their leader and help her in the battle.

Superboy's confrontation with H'El does not last long, as H'El disappears. As Superboy realizes Krypton is about to explode, he tells Kara about his mission. Meanwhile, Supergirl and the clones had defeated H'El, who commits suicide. Supergirl returns to the present while Superboy uses his powers to save Argo City as Krypton explodes, sacrificing his life. Superman has met his father Jor-El, who comes from an alternate future where he discovered he was the one who created H'El in the first place. He has also travelled to the past to ensure H'El does not conquer Krypton. Superman and Jor-El travel to Krypton's core and fight H'El. At first, Jor-El wants to kill H'El but Superman instead uses H'El's chronal powers against him and freezes him with his super-breath, locking H'El in a state of eternal limbo. As Superman and Supergirl are reunited in the present, the Oracle informs them of Superboy's sacrifice. Superman and Supergirl return to Earth but in a small instant, Krypton is brought back to life in the present, right before it disappears.

=== Titles ===
- Action Comics Annual #2
- Superman #23.3, #25
- Superboy #25
- Supergirl #25

== See also ==
- Bizarro
- Bizarro World
