= America Chavez =

Superhero appearing in Marvel Comics

America Chavez Miss America
- America Chavez / Miss America. Variant cover of Women of Marvel #1 (February 2024). Art by Elena Casagrande and Jordie Bellaire.

Publication information
- Publisher: Marvel Comics
- First appearance: Vengeance #1 (September 2011)
- Created by: Joe Casey (writer); Nick Dragotta (artist)

In-story information
- Alter ego: America Chavez (birth name); America Santana (adoptive name)
- Species: Alien (originally); Human mutate (retconned)
- Place of origin: Utopian Parallel (originally); New York City (retconned)
- Team affiliations: West Coast Avengers; Young Avengers; Avengers World; Teen Brigade; Thunderbolts; Champions; Defenders; Ultimates; A-Force
- Partnerships: Peter Parker / Spider-Man; Kate Bishop / Hawkeye; Gwen Poole
- Notable aliases: Miss America; Ms. America; USA
- Abilities: Superhuman strength, speed, and durability; Longevity / decelerated aging; Hyper-cosmic awareness; Inter-dimensional travel; Star portal creation; Energy infusion; Invulnerability; Time travel; Star blast; Flight; Trained hand-to-hand combatant

America Chavez is a superhero appearing in American comic books published by Marvel Comics. Created by writer Joe Casey and artist Nick Dragotta, the character first appeared in Vengeance #1 (September 2011). Chavez is a lesbian superhero of Latin-American origin. She has assumed the mantle of Miss America, previously held by the superheroine Madeline Joyce. Over the course of her publication history, she has been a member of several superhero teams, including A-Force, the Ultimates, and the Young Avengers.

The character was initially depicted as originating from the Utopian Parallel, a dimension outside time and space. She was a Starling of the Fuertona species, an alien race typically possessing supernatural abilities. Her origin was later retconned, revealing that she was born on Earth to scientists attempting to cure her of a disease. The Utopian Parallel was redefined as a medical facility where she underwent experimentation, which ultimately led to the development of her powers. Chavez's signature power is the creation of star-shaped portals that enable her to travel across space and time.

Chavez has been described as one of Marvel's most notable and powerful female heroes, being labelled as the publisher's first Latin-American LGBT character to star in a comic book series as the eponymous character. Since her original introduction in comics, the character has been featured in various other Marvel-licensed products, including video games, animated television series, and merchandise. The character made her live-action debut in the Marvel Cinematic Universe film Doctor Strange in the Multiverse of Madness (2022), portrayed by Xochitl Gomez.

== Concept and creation ==
Joe Casey, the creator of America Chavez, expressed his desire to create a character that would resonate with audiences as deeply as certain figures had with him in his youth. Reflecting on 2010, he admitted uncertainty about whether a substantial audience existed for a Latina superhero, though he is gratified that the times have evolved to embrace her. He further remarked that he imbued Chavez with a distinctive individuality and robust self-confidence, envisioning her as a figure of formidable strength and resolve. In his view, she was crafted as "the Muhammad Ali of the Marvel Universe," embodying heroism that transcends traditional roles, much like Ali's impact extended beyond boxing.

== Publication history ==
=== Marvel Universe ===
==== 2010s ====
America Chavez on the variant cover of America #1 (March 2017) by Jamie McKelvie.

America Chavez debuted in Vengeance #1 (September 2011), created by writer Joe Casey and artist Nick Dragotta. She subsequently appeared in several Marvel series, including Young Avengers (2013) by writer Kieron Gillen and artist Jamie McKelvie, A-Force (2015) by G. Willow Wilson, Marguerite Bennett, and Jorge Molina, Ultimates (2015) by Al Ewing and Kenneth Rocafort as part of the All-New, All-Different Marvel initiative, the Avengers (2015) one-shot, Secret Empire (2017), West Coast Avengers (2018) by Kelly Thompson and Stefano Caselli, Superior Spider-Man (2018), and Avengers No Road Home (2019).

==== 2020s ====
In the 2020s, Chavez appeared in various titles, including Marvel's Voices: Comunidades (2021), Hawkeye: Kate Bishop (2022), Marvel's Voices: Pride (2022), Marvel's Voices Infinity Comic (2022), Defenders: Beyond (2022), by Al Ewing, Thunderbolts (2022) by Jim Zub and Sean Izaakse, Marvel's Voices: Comunidades (2022), Women of Marvel (2023), Marvel's Voices: Pride (2023), the Venom War: It's Jeff (2024) one-shot by Kelly Thompson and Gurihiru, and Imperial (2025) by Jonathan Hickman and Iban Coello.

Chavez has also starred in her own comic books. She headlined America (2017), her first solo comic book series by Gabby Rivera. The announcement of the series with Chavez as the titular character at the 2016 New York Comic Con was met with praise from various critics. She returned in America Chavez: Made in the USA (2021), her second solo comic book series, by Kalinda Vazquez and Carlos Gomez. Chavez appeared in several digital-exclusive releases on Marvel Unlimited as well, including Who Is... America Chavez (2022) by Alex Segura and Carlos Gómez, and Strange Tales: Clea, Wong & America Infinity Comic (2022).

=== Other universes ===
Alternate versions of America Chavez have appeared in other Marvel publications, such as All-New Hawkeye (2015) by Jeff Lemire and Ramón Pérez, Ultimates (2024), What If... Kitty Pryde Stole the Phoenix Force? (2025), Ultimate Endgame (2025), and What If...The Multiverse Was Doomed? (2026).

== Fictional character biography ==
America Chavez believed she was raised by her mothers in the Utopian Parallel, a reality that is out of time and in the presence of the being known as the Demiurge, whose presence she credited with imbuing her with superpowers. In her memory, when Chavez was approximately six years old, the Utopian Parallel was threatened by destruction with black holes. Chavez's mothers sacrificed themselves to seal the black holes, resulting in their particles being scattered across the multiverse itself. Wanting to prove herself as a hero and knowing Utopia did not require salvation, Chavez ran away from her home and her responsibilities. She traveled across different realities, eventually adopted the moniker of Miss America, and began covertly acting as a superhero.

Chavez eventually joined the Teen Brigade and served as co-leader with Ultimate Nullifier. With the Teen Brigade, she freed the In-Betweener from the government confinement center, "Groom Lake Adjacent" in Nevada. With information from the In-Betweener, The Teen Brigade set out to prevent the Young Masters Evil from disrupting a delicate balance between chaos and order. To stop the Young Masters from recruiting Kid Loki, Chavez broke into the Metropolitan Museum of Art, but Loki used the Screaming Idol to send her to the Sixth Dimension. There she fought Tiboro, and was later rescued by the Last Defenders, She-Hulk, and Daimon Hellstrom, under the direction of the In-Betweener. She rejoined her teammates in Latveria where they fought the Braak'nhüd, Young Masters and Doctor Doom. The battle was ended when Ultimate Nullifier shot the In-Betweener. While the smoke cleared, the Teen Brigade covertly departed. Chavez would later part ways with the Teen Brigade due to "musical differences".

After leaving the Teen Brigade, Chavez eventually traveled to Earth-212 and was later approached by the teenage trickster Loki. He pretends to try to persuade Chavez into killing Wiccan for the good of the multiverse. Disgusted with the proposition, Chavez fights with Loki and decides to protect Wiccan. On Earth-616, Chavez stopped Loki from magically attacking Wiccan in his home. Hulkling intervened, but America and Loki quickly fled with little explanation. Chavez later rescued Hulkling, Wiccan, and Loki from the Mother, an inter-dimensional parasite awoken by one of Loki's spells. They all escape aboard Marvel Boy's ship, and aided them in the final face-off with Mother's forces in Central Park. Later, in Young Avengers #15, she reveals offhandedly to the team that she is not interested in men, and writes off her one-time kiss with the male teen superhero Ultimate Nullifier as experimentation. She later begins dating Lisa, an EMT, and dances with her to "close a hole in the universe." She also had a crush on Lady Katherine of Bishop, an alternate version of Kate Bishop, and they have a close relationship.

During the 2015 Secret Wars storyline, Chavez appears as a member of the A-Force, an all-female team of Avengers. Her fans formed a gang called La Chiquitas and changed their hair to Chavez symbols, including fan Sydney Walker. When the island nation of Arcadia is attacked by a megalodon, Chavez throws the shark across the Shield, the wall that separates Arcadia's borders, thus breaking the laws of King Doom. She is subsequently arrested and sentenced to spend the rest of her life protecting the Shield.

After the events of Secret Wars, Chavez joined the newly formed Ultimates team after being invited by Blue Marvel. Chavez also attends Sotomayor University as a student, where she also shares a class with former Young Avenger teammate Prodigy.

In the series America Chavez: Made in the USA, what Chavez knew about her background was called into question. Her previously unknown sister, Catalina, forced her to remember that her mothers were not aliens, but human doctors Amalia and Elena Chavez. The doctors took their daughters to a private island called the Utopian Parallel to attempt to cure the disease Edges Syndrome, but later discovered their benefactor had evil plans for the girls brought there. Chavez gained her superpowers across experiments conducted on her as a child, when she was exposed to extra-dimensional energies. The doctors sacrificed themselves to free America, Catalina, and the other girls, but only Chavez escaped. She was later adopted by the Santanas and took the name of America Santana. Catalina suggested that America made up the alien universe story as a coping mechanism.

== Powers and abilities ==
America Chavez acquired a range of superpowers after being exposed to extra-dimensional energies through experiments conducted on her. She possesses superhuman attributes, such as superhuman strength, speed, durability, and has the power of flight. Her invulnerability allows her to be bullet-proof and also makes her flame retardant. Chavez also has the power to kick open star-shaped portals in reality, allowing her and her teammates to travel through the multiverse and into other realities, including the punch dimension. She is also able to use her star-shaped portals to travel through time. She can move beyond superhuman speed, being able to catch up to and nearly exceed the speed of light as observed by Spectrum in her light form. Chavez has developed the ability to make an enemy burst into tiny star fragments with a punch. In moments of extreme duress, she has been shown to project a large star that releases a powerful energy blast, capable of injuring the likes of Captain Marvel. Her hyper-cosmic awareness allows her to have a metaphysical insight in space and time. She is able to increase her physical fighting ability by harnessing her inherent power from within. Chavez does not age at a normal rate due to her increased lifespan. She is also a trained hand-to-hand combatant, owing to her powers and experience in street fighting.

== Cultural impact and legacy ==
=== Critical response ===
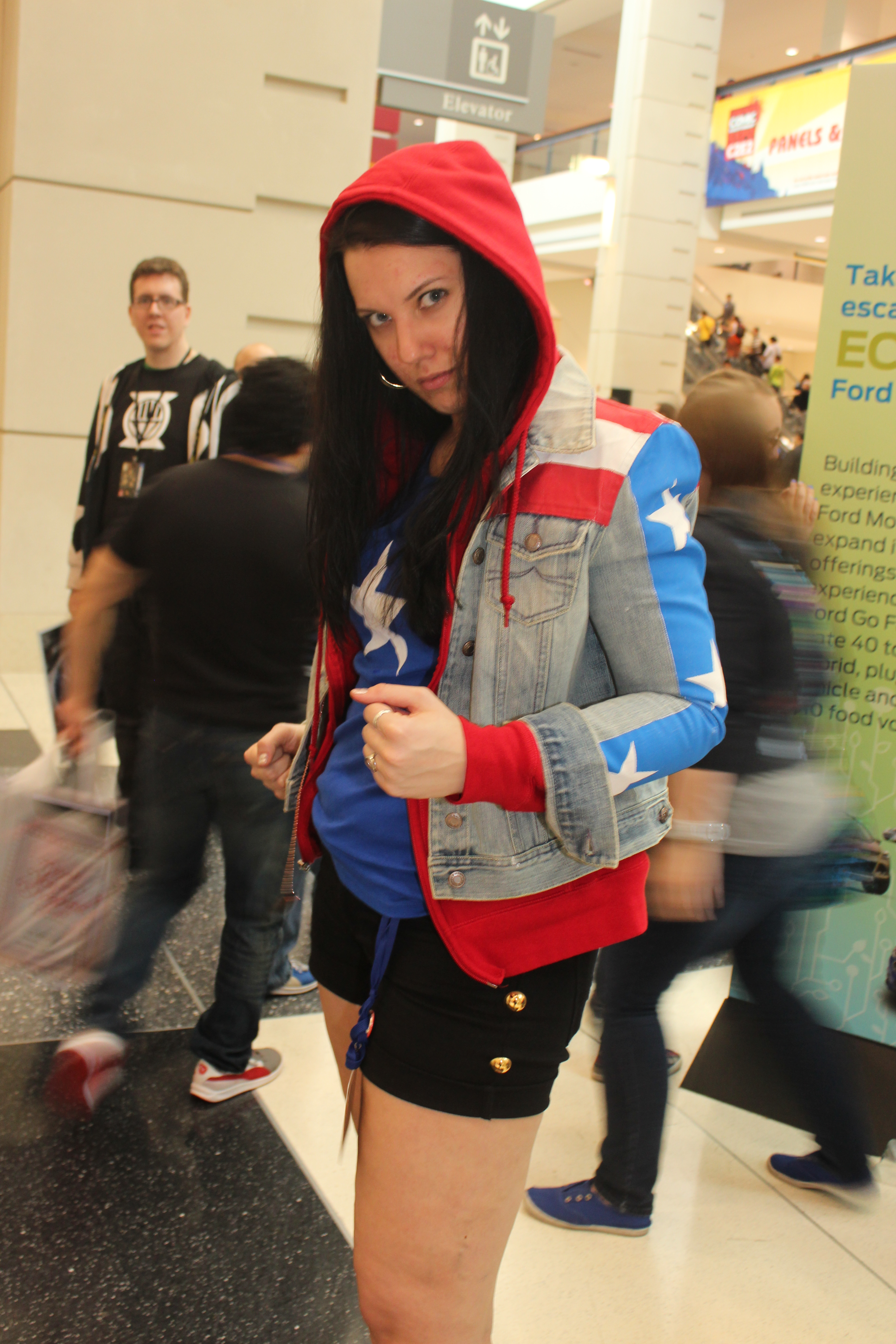
A cosplayer dressed as America Chavez / Miss America

Nivea Serrao of Entertainment Weekly referred to America Chavez as a "fan favorite" character following her appearance in Young Avengers, noting that the character subsequently headlined a "long-awaited" solo series. Dana Forsythe of Paste described Chavez as a "popular hero," noting that despite being a relatively new character introduced in 2011, she has quickly gained significant admiration within the Marvel Comics universe. Deirdre Kaye of Scary Mommy called Chavez a "role model" and a "truly heroic" female character. Kelly Knox of IGN characterized Chavez as a "no-nonsense heavy-hitter," portraying her as headstrong, tough, and fiercely independent, while also characterizing her as a "team player and natural leader." Alyssa Mora of IGN also named her one of their "favorite Latinx heroes." George Marston of Newsarama described Chavez as a "fan-favorite" member of both the Young Avengers and the West Coast Avengers teams. Nick Cimarusti of Sideshow named Chavez one of the "most influential Latinx figures in Marvel Comics" and called her one of the "familiar favorites."

Abraham Riesman of Vulture noted long-standing demand for a series centered on Chavez, describing her as a "one of a kind" queer Latina superhero who has developed a devoted following since her introduction in 2011 and her subsequent appearances with the Young Avengers. Riesman added that Marvel Comics only recently "wised up" by giving the character her own comic book series. Graeme Virtue of The Guardian praised Chavez as a "welcome departure from outdated superhero archetypes," noting that Marvel has now fully recognized her potential as a standout, standalone hero. Kyle Pinion of Comics Beat described America Chavez as "very popular," highlighting that she "garnered a huge fanbase" following her appearance in the Young Avengers series by Kieron Gillen, Jamie McKelvie, and Matt Wilson.

Brian Gallagher of MovieWeb said that Chavez is one of Marvel's "newest and beloved characters," noting the significant fan excitement she has generated in recent years. Shaun Corley of Screen Rant called Chavez a "formidable hero," highlighting her status as a fan favorite since her debut. He noted her success across various team books, a solo title, and her transition to the MCU as impressive for a relatively new character. K.W. Colyard of Bustle referred to Chavez as a "cult-favorite character." Reid Carter of Popverse noted that Chavez is a favorite among cosplayers and fan artists, owing to her "fashionable assortment of patriotic jackets" and her status as one of the most powerful characters in the Marvel universe. Isabelia Herrera of The New York Times included Chavez in their list of "5 Latinx Superheroes to Inspire Your New York Comic Con Look" list, highlighting that the character, introduced in 2011, gained significant popularity with her first solo series written by queer Boricua novelist Gabby Rivera in 2017.

Donohoo of Comic Book Resources said,

America has been a part of predominantly critically well-received books, including the aforementioned Young Avengers and appearances in Kate Bishop's Hawkeye title. While she has had loud detractors, it bears repeating that she also rapidly amassed a relatively large and vocal fanbase. Her woes, in part, can be attributed to increased profile coinciding with a time when comics fans have increasingly dug in about "politics" in comics and a particular contingent reacting with venom to what they insist is "forced diversity". As a character, America's usually shown as a somewhat stony individual, being more observant than obnoxious and talkative. These qualities made her a strong figure within the Young Avengers, standing alongside the similarly star-spangled Patriot. Working alongside older heroes like Carol Danvers in the book The Ultimates, her admiration and respect for them was ironically seen as a legacy character done right. Her costume, much like Kamala Khan's, is also a great blend of stylish and superheroic, perfect for a modern multiversal Marvel heroine."

Gemma Goodall of Daily Review included Chavez in her list of "10 More Female Superheroes who Deserve a Movie," expressing anticipation for a future film adaptation. Goodall noted that although Chavez's first solo comic book was released in March 2017 and it might take some time before the character appears on the big screen, she remains excited about the possibility. Nathalie Zutter of Tor.com included Chavez in her "Female Heroes of Color Who Should Get Their Own TV Show" list. Sarah Brown of Collider included Chavez in her list of "30 Marvel Superheroes That Need to Join the MCU," noting her popularity as a member of the Young Avengers. Riley Bocchicchio of Collider also ranked her 7th in their "10 Most Powerful Marvel A-Force Members" list. Umberto Gonzalez of TheWrap ranked Chavez 4th in his "10 Female Superheroes Who Deserve Their Own Movie" list. Kieran Shiach of ComicsAlliance described Chavez as a "breakout fan-favorite character," while the ComicsAlliance staff ranked her 7th in their list of "Comics' Sexiest Female Characters," praising her fashion style and confident demeanor. Lance Cartelli of GameSpot ranked Chavez 17th in their list of "50 Most Important Superheroes," highlighting her significant impact and appeal. Matthew Aguilar of ComicBook.com referred to Chavez as a "fan favorite," noting her status as one of Marvel's "amazing" recent characters. Lance Cartelli of ComicBook.com also ranked her 21st in his list of "50 Most Important Superheroes Ever." The A.V. Club placed Chavez 97th in their "100 Best Marvel Characters" list.

Rick Stevenson of Looper referred to America Chavez as a "queer icon." Kwame Opam of The Verge highlighted Chavez as a significant figure among the limited number of queer superheroes of color in comics, emphasizing her "iconic" status and the strong desire among fans for "better representation in the medium." Michele Kirichanskaya of ComicsVerse stated that Chavez is one of Marvel's most high-profile LGBTQIA+ heroes. She found that her story stands out by integrating LGBTQIA+ representation in a way that focuses on dynamic adventures and fun, rather than the traditional "coming out" narrative. Kirichanskaya praised America's character for providing a broader and more engaging representation of LGBTQIA+ experiences. Carlos Gomez of Daily Trojan said that Chavez is a "fascinating" character due to her relative newness, first appearing in 2011, and her growing popularity. He found her to be particularly "compelling" because she represents an often "underrepresented demographic" as an LGBTQ+ woman of color. Gomez praised Chavez for her unique combination of strength and vulnerability, noting her struggle with severe childhood trauma as a potential source of numerous engaging stories for Marvel to explore.

Catrina Dennis of Remezcla found that Gabby Rivera succeeded in representing the Latinx community through Chavez, praising the character for her unique impact. Dennis highlighted that Chavez's journey is far from over, noting her role as a "formidable ally" and her ability to fit into diverse storylines due to her control over time and space. She commended the comic series for featuring a Latinx LGBTQ+ lead, which was rare in major comics, and appreciated how it "humanized" Chavez by exploring her personal struggles and distinctive perspective, adding depth to her character beyond her formidable exterior. Jason Wiese of CinemaBlend called a "teenage Latina and LGBTQ+ icon," asserting that she has quickly become a significant figure in Marvel Comics due to her cultural representation. He noted that despite her extra-dimensional origins, Chavez's introduction to Earth-616 through a Puerto Rican family deeply informed her ethnic identity. Wiese emphasized that her importance extends beyond just racial representation, highlighting her broader impact as a cultural icon. Nicole Chavez of CNN noted that Chavez is breaking new ground both "in the comics universe and beyond." She highlighted that the character is the first lesbian Latina superhero to headline her own Marvel Comics series, marking a significant achievement. She emphasized that Chavez defies typical heroine stereotypes and represents a fresh, non-traditional portrayal of a Latina character. May Rude of Out highlighted Chavez's rise to prominence as a member of the Young Avengers before securing her own comic series by Gabby Rivera. She pointed out that Chavez has become a "fan favorite," particularly among queer individuals and Latinx fans.

Brian Truitt of USA Today argued that Chavez is a character who deserves her own film, noting that as a Latin-American teen lesbian superheroine, she represents a groundbreaking choice. He described her as bulletproof, super-strong, and refreshingly untraditional, suggesting that her unique qualities make her an ideal candidate for a standout movie or even a future Captain America. Matt Kim of Inverse described Chavez as a "fan favorite," highlighting her status as an "icon" among socially progressive comic readers. He attributed her popularity to her distinctive attitude as a punch-first, questions-later superhero, which has endeared her to fans and solidified her reputation as one of Marvel's most enthusiastic heroes. Zack Krajnyak of Screen Rant found the potential inclusion of Chavez in the MCU to be "incredibly significant." He noted that her addition would represent a "significant milestone" due to her being a Latin-American LGBTQ character. Krajnyak expressed hope that Chavez would play a major role in the MCU's future, especially with the rumored inclusion of Young Avengers characters like Wiccan and Kate Bishop. Krajnyak suggested that if Chavez appears in Doctor Strange in the Multiverse of Madness, she could become a pivotal figure, potentially making a strong impact on screen if she mirrors her dynamic on-page presence. Michael Rizi of Queerty included America Chavez in their "6 LGBTQ Marvel Characters Who Deserve Their Own Shows Now" list.

Sam Damshenas of Gay Times included Chavez in their list of "13 Queer Superheroes We Need To See In The Marvel Cinematic Universe," asserting that her presence would be an exciting addition, especially given her fit for the sequel to Avengers: Infinity War. Mey Rude of Autostraddle ranked Chavez 1st in their list of "7 LGBT Women Who Need to Appear in the MCU Immediately," praising her as a fan-favorite character with an engaging story and impressive fashion. Rude also ranked Chavez 8th in their list of "11 Female Superheroes I Wish Marvel Would Make Movies About," highlighting her as a standout character in the recent Young Avengers series, noting her combination of toughness and charm. Ashley C. Ford of BuzzFeed ranked Chavez 1st in their list of "12 Kick-Ass Gay Women In Comics And Graphic Novels" list. Pablo Valdivia of BuzzFeed also placed her 11th in their list of "15 Incredible Latino Superheroes You Need To Know," highlighting her as a significant Latino character in the superhero genre. Jeremy Brown of Game Rant ranked America Chavez 4th in their "11 Best LGBTQ+ Marvel Characters" list.

Gavia Baker-Whitelaw of The Daily Dot ranked America Chavez 4th in their "Top 12 LGBTQ superheroes in DC and Marvel comics" list and stated that the character gained a "cult following" after her reappearance in New Avengers, asserting, "She's a super-strong badass with the ability to fly and travel to other dimensions—not to mention she has one of the most cosplay-able costumes in the Marvel universe." Baker-Whitelaw also ranked her 10th in their "Top 33 Female Superheroes Of All Time" list. Cameron Glover of The Mary Sue called America Chavez a "fan favorite," while Michele Kirichanskaya ranked her 6th in their list of "8 Young, New Heroes the Marvel Cinematic Universe Should Focus on Next." Kirichanskaya highlighted Chavez as a symbol of crucial representation in comics, noting the significant support for her character and praising Gabby Rivera as the acclaimed author who created her solo series.

Additionally, Chavez has been highly ranked across multiple lists from Screen Rant and Comic Book Resources, including lists for Latinx and teen Marvel heroes, as well as lists of powerful and well-written Marvel characters.

=== Impact ===
America Chavez has been the subject of comparisons with some characters in the comic book industry regarding her representation and abilities. In 2016, she was compared to the protagonist of a one-shot in development by writer Joe Casey (who created Chavez) and artist Dustin Nguyen for Image Comics, inspiring discussions among journalists about her influence on the new character. Several critics noted that Chavez served as an inspiration for the comic book publisher's latest protagonist, highlighting their similarities. This connection was further emphasized in subsequent years, particularly with the release of All-America Comix #1 (July 2020), where additional journalists asserted that Chavez inspired Casey and Nguyen for the creation of Image Comics' new character. Years later, in 2023, several critics noted similarities between the newly acquired superpowers of DC Comics' character Power Girl and those of Chavez.

The representation of the character has led to notable achievements and recognition. In 2017, Chavez was featured as the titular character in her own comic book series, America (2017–2018). She made history as the first Latin-American LGBT character in Marvel Comics to star in a solo comic book series as the eponymous character. In 2018, Supreme Court Justice Sonia Sotomayor wrote to America series writer Gabby Rivera, acknowledging the significance of the character. She stated, "You have created a powerful female character in the production of America, and I know you will forever inspire many individuals by continuing to invent America Chavez's story. Indeed, it is important to remind readers to take time to honor themselves and embrace their differences as strengths." Several journalists have also identified the character as the first Latin-American LGBT superhero to star in the Marvel Cinematic Universe (MCU) media franchise.

Chavez has generated significant public interest. She notably garnered media attention in March 2018 when American actress Gina Rodriguez expressed her enthusiasm to audition for the role of Chavez, declaring herself a fan of the character. This interest was echoed in May by Argentine-American actress Stephanie Beatriz, who also shared her desire to portray Chavez on Twitter. Chavez further captured the public's attention in October 2018 when Beatriz dressed up as Chavez for Halloween, generating significant media coverage. In September 2022, Chavez placed third in a popularity contest held by Multiversity Comics, where readers elected their "Favorite Latin American Superhero."

The character has been referenced in other media as well. In 2022, the comic book America Chavez: Made in the USA #1 (March 3, 2021) appeared as an easter egg in a display case in the final episode of the miniseries She-Hulk: Attorney at Law.

=== Accolades ===
America Chavez won Favorite Queer Character at the 2014 Autostraddle Comic and Sequential Art Awards. In 2018, the America series was nominated for Outstanding Comic Book at the 29th GLAAD Media Awards. Chavez was also nominated for Best First Appearance at the 2022 Golden Issue Awards.

== Literary reception ==
=== Volumes ===
ComicHub reported that the Marvel-Verse: America Chavez trade paperback was the 67th best-selling graphic novel in May 2022. The ComicHub Top 100 Graphic Novels sales chart reflects sales data collected from the ComicHub system at comic shops across the globe that sell American comics. This report was created based on information from more than 100 stores that used the ComicHub system during the reporting period.

==== America (2017) ====
Diamond Comic Distributors reported that America #1 was the 37th best-selling comic book in March 2017. The America TPB Vol 1 1: The Life and Times of America Chavez trade paperback was the 30th best-selling graphic novel in October 2017.

Kat Vendetti of ComicsVerse gave America #1 a score of 95%, praising it as a heartfelt and promising debut. She found that the creative team effectively presents America Chavez as a multifaceted and relatable character, noting that the issue starts strong. Vendetti highlighted that the comic fulfills its promise of showcasing an unapologetically queer Latina superhero, emphasizing her vibrant presence in a universe where she truly shines. Matthew Aguilar of ComicBook.com gave America #1 a grade of 4 out of 5 stars, described America Chavez as a “breath of fresh air” and praised the character's confidence, charisma, and impulsiveness. Aguilar highlighted the contrast between Chavez's outward self-assurance and her internal struggles, particularly in relation to emotional vulnerability and love. He emphasized that the character does not fit a traditional superhero mold and praised the portrayal of her sexuality and race as integrated aspects of her character rather than defining traits. He also commended Joe Quinones' artwork as "lively" and "energetic." Jesse Schedeen of IGN gave the first comic book 8.5 out of 10, stating that the issue effectively dispels any doubts about the need for a solo comic for America Chavez. He found the new series to offer an "engaging" portrayal of Chavez, focusing on humorous and grounded character drama rather than just superhero action. Schedeen suggested that fans of The Unbeatable Squirrel Girl or Hawkeye would particularly enjoy this approach.

==== America Chavez: Made in the USA (2021) ====
Diamond Comic Distributors reported that America Chavez: Made in the USA #1 was the 18th top advance-reordered comic book by retailers between February 1 to February 7, 2021. Advance reorders are used to assess anticipated market interest and potential sales performance. It was the 88th best-selling comic book in March 2021.

Joe Grunenwald of Comics Beat described America Chavez: Made in the USA #1 as nearly "flawless" for a debut. He praised the issue for its strong script from an emerging talent, coupled with impressive line art, colors, and the consistent quality of letterer Travis Lanham. Grunenwald found the reading experience highly satisfying and enjoyable, suggesting that if the remaining issues maintain this high standard, the miniseries could be a leading contender for one of the "best Big 2 books of the year." Sam Stone of Comic Book Resources called America Chavez: Made in the USA #1 a "solid opening issue." He noted that the comic serves as an "accessible" entry point for readers unfamiliar with America Chavez, balancing action with introspection. Stone praised the script for effectively exploring the character's past and its impact on her future, with particular strength in the portrayal of her psyche. He found the present-day sequences more "effective" than the flashback elements. Stone also highlighted the successful collaboration between writer Vasquez and artist Gomez, which brings the themes of power and responsibility to a personal level, suggesting that the miniseries is set to deepen as it progresses. Robert Reed of Newsarama gave America Chavez: Made in the USA #1 a grade of 8 out of 10, writing that the series serves as a "modern homage to Superman's origin." Reed stated that the "draw to America Chavez: Made in the USA is the character herself," noting that the comic provides an "intimate look at America’s first night with her found family," an aspect of the character's past that "hasn’t always been rendered with real detail." He also praised the portrayal of Chavez's vulnerability and the importance of her family relationships, writing that the creative team sets up what promises to be an emotionally charged limited series

== Other versions ==
=== Age of Ultron ===
An alternate version of America Chavez appears in the "Age of Ultron" storyline. A picture of Chavez is present in one of Nick Fury's safe houses.

=== All-New Hawkeye ===
An alternate version of America Chavez appears in a possible future in the Marvel Universe. An older Chavez is a captain of S.H.I.E.L.D. and has taken on the mantle of Captain America Chavez.

=== "House of M" ===
In the alternate reality seen in the storyline "House of M", an alternate version of America Chavez appears who is a member of the Young Avengers and fights the Sentinels.

=== Ultimate Universe ===
An alternate version of America Chavez appears in the Ultimate Universe (Earth-6160) series The Ultimates. This version was imprisoned by Doctor Midas and used to power part of the North American Union's electrical grid until she is saved by Wasp.

When the Ultimates encounter the time-traveling Guardians of the Galaxy, Captain Marvel identifies Chavez as one of their displaced members, though she does not remember them. Cosmo Starstalker scanned her mind and found that any memories she had of them were "amputated." Captain Marvel still remembers Chavez and reveals that they were once lovers until they were separated in time when fleeing the Unmaker.

== In other media ==
=== Television ===
America Chavez / Miss America appears in the Marvel Rising series of short films and television specials, voiced by Cierra Ramirez. This version's home dimension was attacked by the Kree, which led to her mothers teleporting her to another dimension for her safety before they were killed by Hala the Accuser. Chavez went on to work at an auto garage before reluctantly becoming involved in Squirrel Girl's efforts to rescue her friend Ms. Marvel from their version of Hala the Accuser and eventually found the Secret Warriors.

=== Film ===
- America Chavez appears in the Marvel Cinematic Universe (MCU) film Doctor Strange in the Multiverse of Madness (2022), portrayed by Xochitl Gomez. This version is a humanoid supernatural being from the Utopian Parallel with the ability to travel across the multiverse. After being attacked by the Scarlet Witch, who is corrupted by the Darkhold and seeks to acquire her powers, Chavez eventually ends up in the "prime" 616 universe and joins forces with Doctor Strange to defeat the Scarlet Witch. Afterwards, Chavez chooses to live in Earth-616 and joins the Masters of the Mystic Arts to fully develop her abilities.
- Chavez was originally intended to appear in the MCU film Spider-Man: No Way Home (2021), depicted as a senior apprentice studying under Doctor Strange. However, this idea was eventually scrapped, owing to the film releasing before Doctor Strange in the Multiverse of Madness as a result of delays.

=== Video games ===
- America Chavez / Miss America appears via the "Marvel's Women of Power" DLC in Pinball FX 2.
- America Chavez / Miss America appears as an unlockable playable character in Marvel Puzzle Quest.
- America Chavez / Miss America appears as a playable character in Marvel Contest of Champions.
- America Chavez / Miss America appears as an unlockable playable character in Marvel: Future Fight.
- America Chavez / Miss America appears as an unlockable playable character in Lego Marvel's Avengers.
- America Chavez / Miss America appears as an unlockable playable character in Marvel Avengers Academy, voiced by Sandra Espinoza.
- America Chavez / Miss America appears as an unlockable playable character in Lego Marvel Super Heroes 2.
- America Chavez / Miss America appears as a playable character in Marvel Strike Force.
- America Chavez / Miss America appears as an assist character in Marvel Future Revolution.
- America Chavez / Miss America appears as a playable card in Marvel Snap.

=== Merchandise ===
- In 2018, Hasbro released several America Chavez / Miss America dolls inspired by the Marvel Rising incarnation of the character.
- In 2022, Disney released an America Chavez / Miss America doll inspired by the MCU incarnation of the character. Hasbro released an America Chavez / Miss America action figure inspired by the MCU incarnation of the character, as part of the Marvel Legends action figure line. Lego released an America Chavez / Miss America Lego minifigure inspired by the MCU incarnation of the character. Funko released an America Chavez / Miss America Funko Pop figure inspired by the MCU incarnation of the character.
- In 2023, Disney released an America Chavez / Miss America pair of ear headbands inspired by the MCU incarnation of the character.

=== Miscellaneous ===
- America Chavez / Miss America appears in the board game Marvel United, published by CMON Limited.
- America Chavez / Miss America appears in the web series Marvel Rising: Ultimate Comics, voiced by Cierra Ramirez.
- The MCU incarnation of America Chavez appears as a meet and greet character at Disney California Adventure.
- Gomez reprises her role as America Chavez in the theme park restaurant Worlds of Marvel on the Disney Treasure cruise ship.

== Collected editions ==
Title	Material collected	Published date	ISBN
America Vol. 1: The Life and Times of America Chavez	America #1–6	October 18, 2017	978-1302908812
America Vol. 2: Fast and Fuertona	America #7–12	April 11, 2018	978-1302908829
America Chavez: Made in the USA (miniseries)	Collect issues #1–5	November 3, 2021	978-1302924454

== See also ==
- Miss America (Madeline Joyce)
