= Helena Sandsmark =

- Helena Sandsmark as depicted in Teen Titans (vol. 5) #3 (December 2014). Art by Kenneth Rocafort.

Publication information
- Publisher: DC Comics
- First appearance: Wonder Woman (vol. 2) #105 (January 1996)
- Created by: John Byrne

In-story information
- Species: Human
- Supporting character of: Wonder Woman; Wonder Girl (Cassie Sandsmark)

Professor Helena Sandsmark is a DC Comics character created by writer/artist John Byrne for the Wonder Woman comic book series, first appearing in Wonder Woman (vol. 2) #105. The mother of the second incarnation of Wonder Girl, Cassandra Sandsmark and a distinguished academic in the field of archaeology, Helena is also close friends with her daughter's mentor Wonder Woman.

== Fictional character biography ==
=== Post-Zero Hour introduction ===
Helena and her daughter Cassie/Wonder Girl are introduced into the DC Universe following the Zero Hour: Crisis in Time! storyline.

Helena studied archeology at Harvard University under Julia Kapatelis, and was one of her brightest students. After graduation, she participated in several digs around the world, including one in Greece. On the merits of her work in Greece and a recommendation from Julia, Helena was appointed curator at the Gateway City Museum of Antiquities.

Helena met a man whom she later found out was the Olympian god Zeus. She eventually became pregnant with his demigod child, but he had disappeared from her life by the time she gave birth to Cassie. Helena had raised Cassie alone without revealing the identity of her father or her divine parentage. Julia sent her friend Wonder Woman to Gateway City, so she could study at the museum. While there, Diana befriended Helena and her daughter.

Zeus gifts Cassie with superpowers and gives Helena the ability to remove Cassie's powers by speaking one word, effectively grounding her if necessary. When Cassie learns that Zeus is her father, the revelation nearly destroys her relationship with Helena. Helena later makes amends with Cassie and gives her blessing to continue as Wonder Girl.

In Amazons Attack!, Wonder Girl and Supergirl attempt to negotiate an end to the war between the Amazons and the United States, but inadvertently make things worse when the president of the United States is killed. Helena is deemed a collaborator by the US government and sent to an internment camp, leading Cassie to mount an attempted rescue. At her mother's insistence that the situation be settled peacefully, Wonder Girl finally departs.

In the war's wake, Wonder Girl and her mother are viewed with a wary eye. Leaving the Gateway Museum, Helena takes a sabbatical in Greece and uses the Gauntlet of Atlas and Sandals of Hermes to keep her safe. They prove invaluable when the Female Furies and Hercules abduct her. When Hercules attacks Wonder Girl, Helena rescues her.

Helena joins fellow archeologists Vijay and Rani Singh for a dig in Mohenjo-daro. When Vijay and Rani both mysteriously disappeared, Helena called the Teen Titans for help. Upon arriving, the Titans joined Kiran Singh – the brilliantly super-powered Solstice – in the search for her parents. But the team soon found itself trapped in a lost kingdom as they were attacked by the Hindu god King Rankor and his demonic minions. In the most brilliant display of her powers to date, Solstice unleashed a blinding pulse that drove the demons away, liberating Helena and the Singhs from King Rankor's grasp.

Helena later joins fellow archeologists Vijay and Rani Singh for a dig in Mohenjo-daro. When Vijay and Rani disappear, Helena calls the Teen Titans for help. The Titans join the Singhs' daughter Kiran Singh – also known as Solstice – to find her parents. The Titans find Solstice's parents, but are attacked by the Hindu god Rankor, who Solstice manages to fend off.

=== The New 52 ===
In The New 52 continuity reboot, Cassie Sandsmark is Zeus' granddaughter rather than his daughter. Her father Lennox Sandsmark, Wonder Woman's half-brother and Zeus' son, left the family when Cassie was four, leaving Helena to raise her alone.

== In other media ==
- Helena Sandsmark appears in Young Justice, voiced by Mae Whitman.
- Helena Sandsmark appears as a non-playable character (NPC) in Young Justice: Legacy, voiced again by Mae Whitman.
- Helena Sandsmark appears in the DC Animated Universe tie-in comics Adventures in the DC Universe and DC Comics Presents: Wonder Woman Adventures.
- Helena Sandsmark appears in Teen Titans Go! #54.
