= Sideways (comics) =

Superhero created by DC Comics

- Sideways #1 (April 2018) by Kenneth Rocafort

Publication information
- Publisher: DC Comics
- First appearance: Sideways #1 (February 2018)
- Created by: Dan DiDio; Justin Jordan; Kenneth Rocafort

In-story information
- Alter ego: Derek James
- Team affiliations: Seven Soldiers; Young Justice; Justice League
- Abilities: Trans-dimensional travel Teleportation; Superhuman strength and durability

Sideways (Derek James) is a superhero created by writers Dan DiDio, Justin Jordan, and artist Kenneth Rocafort who appears in media published by DC Comics.

== Publication history ==
The character debuted in Sideways #1, which was originally promoted in spring 2017 as part of a group of new comic series set for release in fall of that year. They were branded as the "Dark Matter" line and their stories follow events from the Dark Nights: Metal crossover. That November, the line was rebranded as "The New Age of DC Heroes" and publication was delayed until early 2018.

The first issue of Sideways was published on February 14, 2018. Like the other first issues in the line, it featured a vertical gatefold cover. When closed, the cover shows Sideways exiting a portal in the sky. When opened, additional characters can be seen on the ground below him and in the sky above him.

Sideways appeared in the background of a group shot in Dan Jurgens' story in Action Comics #1000.

Writer Grant Morrison co-wrote the series' first and only annual with DiDio. The series ended in February 2019 with its 13th issue.

== Fictional character biography ==
Derek James is a Puerto Rican high school student who gains the ability to create interdimensional rifts after falling through a dimensional rift. Derek is best friends with a girl named Ernestine, and is unpopular in school, as well as adopted.

A few months after Derek acquires his powers, he is video recording his powers when he meets a being known as Tempus Fuginaut who accuses Derek of causing tears in reality. Derek escapes, but dislocates his shoulder, and goes to his best friend Ernestine for help. Ernestine takes him to the hospital, where Derek's adoptive mother arrives worrying for him. Suddenly, a mentally unstable woman named Killspeed breaks out and kills several hospital staff members to obtain money to treat her cancer. Derek puts his Sideways costume on and they fight, with Sideways defeating her. When the police arrive, Sideways uses his Rift abilities to teleport, but he accidentally severs Killspeed's arm.

A few weeks later, Derek teams up with Hot Spot, a former Teen Titan, to take down a man named Replicant who can replicate superpowers. Replicant accidentally kills himself when he creates multiple rifts on top of his body, and Sideways gains popularity. In issue #5, Sideways is called out by a villain named Showman who gains power from others' anger. With quick thinking from Erin, she calms the audience, which allows Sideways to teleport Showman to a different location where he defeats him. Derek later takes revenge on the people who killed his adopted mother and joins Young Justice.

== Powers and abilities ==
Due to Derek falling through the Dark Multiverse during the Dark Nights: Metal event, he acquired several powers involving reality and spacetime manipulation. Derek has the ability to create rifts (tears in the space-time continuum) which allow him to travel through any place he wants as long as he knows where it is. He can also teleport to other people's locations as long as he knows who they are; he did not know where his best friend was but when he imagined her face, he immediately teleported to her location. He can also use rifts for offensive abilities, like cutting off people or redirecting their attacks back at them. Sideways also has super strength and durability as well. When Derek creates a rift on top of another rift, it can create a miniature black hole.

== Critical reception ==
The character has been commonly compared to Marvel Comics character Spider-Man, specifically the Ultimate version, evoking both his costume design and personality. The character and comic initially received mixed reviews, with the first issue averaging 7 out of 10 according to review aggregator Comic Book Roundup. Over time, the series received generally positive reviews with an average rating of 7.4 out of 10. In a review of the first issue for IGN, Blair Marnell praised Rocafort's art but said the teenage dialogue was "so far off of the mark that it borders on self-parody". Bleeding Cool called the character "charming" but the story "meandering". It went on to say Rocafort's art is fantastic but not the best fit for the comic's tone. The character is part of an effort to increase diversity in comics and has received attention for being a minority character drawn by a Puerto Rican artist.
