= Blue Marvel =

Marvel Comics superhero

- Artwork from Age of Heroes #3. Depicting from left: King Hyperion vs. Blue Marvel. Art by M. C. Wyman.

Publication information
- Publisher: Marvel Comics
- First appearance: Adam: Legend of the Blue Marvel #1 (November 2008)
- Created by: Kevin Grevioux (writer); Mat Broome (artist)

In-story information
- Alter ego: Adam Bernard Brashear
- Species: Human mutate
- Place of origin: Earth
- Team affiliations: United States Marine Corps; Avengers; Mighty Avengers; Ultimates; Defenders; Illuminati
- Notable aliases: Blue Bomber of Battle; The Man of Marvels
- Abilities: Superhuman strength, speed, stamina, durability, and mental perception; Anti-matter manipulation, absorption and projection; Energy manipulation, absorption and projection; Nigh-invulnerability; Light generation; Longevity; Flight; Trained armed and unarmed combatant; Trained hand-to-hand combatant; Genius-level intellect

Blue Marvel (Adam Bernard Brashear) is a superhero appearing in American comic books published by Marvel Comics. Created by Kevin Grevioux, who originally conceived the character as a child, and Mat Broome, the character first appeared in Adam: Legend of the Blue Marvel #1 (November 2008).

== Publication history ==
Adam Brashear was created by Kevin Grevioux and Mat Broome. He first appeared in Adam: Legend of the Blue Marvel #1.

In 2013, Blue Marvel appeared as part of Luke Cage's new team of superheroes during the "Infinity" crossover, in the Marvel NOW! relaunch of Mighty Avengers.

== Fictional character biography ==
Adam Brashear is a former fullback at Cornell University as well as a veteran of the Korean War, where he served in the Marine Corps. Brashear later led efforts to harness anti-matter from the Negative Zone as a source of power. The reactor used in the project became unstable, exposing Brashear and his friend Conner Sims to radiation. Sims dissolved into energy, while Brashear became a superpowered "antimatter reactor".

Brashear operates as the hero Blue Marvel until 1962, when he is outed as black and forced to retire. He leaves the Presidential Medal of Freedom, which he received from President John F. Kennedy, on the Blue Area of the Moon. Shortly afterward, Brashear confronts an alien armada, with the United States government using this final mission to fake his death. Brashear later became a tenured professor of physics at the University of Maryland.

Brashear confronts Conner Sims when he returns as the villain Anti-Man, seeking to end racism. Brashear returns as a full-time superhero in the series Age of Heroes, where he helps the Winter Guard battle King Hyperion.

During the 2013 "Infinity" storyline, Uatu visited Blue Marvel in his Undersea Science Fortress which he had previously modified. Blue Marvel talked with Uatu about his family life and how he could have taken up the opportunity to join the Avengers. After a one-sided conversation, Blue Marvel took up his costume and flew through Shuma-Gorath's head during its fight with Luke Cage's team. He was able to heal Spectrum, who had been incapacitated by Proxima Midnight's spear, and boost her powers temporarily. Subsequently, Blue Marvel was among those Cage declared to be part of his Mighty Avengers.

As part of the 2015 All-New, All-Different Marvel initiative, Blue Marvel appeared as a member of the Ultimates. Blue Marvel's first mission with the Ultimates involved retrieving the incubator that Galactus was brought out of prematurely. Once they put him back into it, he fully emerged as a lifebringer. While in Exo-Space with the Ultimates within their ship the Aboena, Blue Marvel finds that Anti-Man has reassembled there.

During the 2016 "Civil War II" storyline, Ulysses Cain experiences a vision that warns Blue Marvel about the impending arrival of the inter-dimensional traveler Infinaut on Earth, which will endanger the planet. This warning gives sufficient time for Blue Marvel, Giant-Man, and the Ultimates to devise a Pym Particle accelerator with which they can shrink Infinaut down to the size of a human.

== Powers and abilities ==
Blue Marvel has the ability to absorb energy from matter-anti-matter annihilation, which originates from the inter-dimensional universe called the Negative Zone.

Blue Marvel possesses vast superhuman strength. He has been observed moving a meteor the size of Arkansas and routinely lifting and flying an aircraft carrier a considerable distance with ease. The uppermost limits of Blue Marvel's strength is unknown, but it is in the same category as Hulk, Sentry, and Thor. He possesses nigh-invulnerability and durability, being capable of withstanding tremendous impact forces, exposure to temperature and pressure extremes, and powerful energy blasts without sustaining injury. Blue Marvel flies by manipulation of gravitons, manipulation of magnetic fields, control of his absolute molecular movement, and utilizing his superhuman speed. Blue Marvel can easily attain escape velocity (or escape speed, which is about 34 times the speed of sound) and fly far beyond supersonic speeds, but it is not known if he can achieve speeds beyond the speed of light. Blue Marvel possesses the ability to sense and comprehend things on levels that far exceed human capabilities. Blue Marvel has the ability to generate and control negative matter energy based on antimatter for various effects, including creating energy constructs. He can release his energy in the form of energy blasts, including concussive force bolts, stunning bolts, and energy pulses. Blue Marvel is able to affect matter at a molecular level with a great degree of precision and control, as he did when he not only healed Monica Rambeau, but further boosted her electromagnetic abilities. It is not known if this ability is limited to electromagnetic particles only, or if the Blue Marvel is able to affect all matter, allowing him to alter an object's molecular composition or transmute elements. Blue Marvel has exhibited the ability to emit light from his body. Blue Marvel ages much slower and lives much longer than normal human beings. He has been trained by the US Marines in armed and unarmed combat.

Brashear holds a PhD in Theoretical Physics and a Master of Science degree in electrical engineering from Cornell University. He maintains a massive undersea headquarters in the Marianas Trench at a location known only to Namor the Sub-Mariner. Brashear normally wears gauntlets on both arms that channel and augment his vast powers. Blue Marvel is able to create portals from technology that he invented that far exceeds any technology currently on earth. Blue Marvel's main weakness is Neutronium, a substance from the Exo-Space.

== Reception ==
=== Critical response ===
Adam Barnhardt of ComicBook.com asserted, "Adam Brashear has been a fan-favorite since his introduction some 13 years ago and has been a heavy-hitter cosmic character that could make a major splash in the Marvel Cinematic Universe." Brandon Bush of Syfy referred to Blue Marvel as Marvel's "Black Superman," writing, "Blue Marvel's rivalry with his BFF-turned-nemesis, his relationships with other characters of diverse racial backgrounds and political alignments, and the suppression of such a powerful hero bring out another piece of Blue Marvel's relevance to the political discussions of today. While addressing the symbolic pitfalls of white savior complexes and the complicated nature of race relations in the '60s, his story augments the significance of political presence and action. Using characters such as Blue Marvel to discuss critical and even "touchy" subjects such as changing policy, leadership, behavior, and societal views helps to raise awareness of issues in African American communities. Showcasing powerful Black characters who are at the forefront of these conversations on the comic book pages and on our silver screens can be helpful toward showcasing more diversity and increasing empathy." Marco Vito Oddo of Collider included Blue Marvel in their "7 Most Powerful Avengers Who Aren't in the MCU" list, saying, "While there's no doubt that Blue Marvel is one of the most powerful Avengers to be ever presented by Marvel Comics, the fascinating aspect of the character is his backstory."

Screen Rant included Blue Marvel in their "10 Strongest Avengers Still Missing From The MCU" list, and in their "MCU: 10 New Heroes Who Should Be Introduced In Phase Five" list. CBR.com ranked Blue Marvel 1st in their "Marvel Comics: The Most Powerful African American Characters" list, 1st in their "10 Marvel Heroes We Want To See In The MCU's Phase 5" list, 4th in their "10 Best New Avengers Of The Decade" list, 4th in their "10 Strongest Male Avengers" list, 5th in their "The 8 Fastest Avengers" list, 7th in their "10 Strongest Black Superheroes" list, 8th in their "Most Powerful Marvel Characters Not Yet Seen In The MCU" list, and 19th in their "25 Smartest Characters In The Marvel Universe" list.

== Literary reception ==
=== Volumes ===
==== Adam: Legend of the Blue Marvel - 2008 ====
According to Diamond Comic Distributors, Adam: Legend of the Blue Marvel #1 was the 115th best selling comic book in November 2008.

Daniel Crown of IGN gave Adam: Legend of the Blue Marvel #1 a grade of 7.3 out of 10, writing, "The bulk of the issue serves as a tale of the times, exploring the decision making process behind issues that many of us would believe rather clear-cut, yet given the era at hand, made for tough discourse. Grevioux doesn't hold back any punches, but also never really dips into hyperbole in order to make his points, which I imagine would be hard to do given current public sentiment. There are times where specific characters seem like cardboard cutouts of the archetypal bigot, but it's also fair to say that these sorts of walking clichés actually existed/exist, so these portrayals aren't just justified, but also accurate. Matt Broome's pencils are clean and consistent, though his character designs, specifically in regards to the main antagonist, are fairly customary. The Anti-Man is downright awkward in scheme, though I'm not sure how much of that is Groome's fault, as much as how he was told to draw him. In the end, I can't think of a better time for this type of story to surface. We're at a crossroads in America and in some ways Legend of the Blue Marvel can help to accentuate both past sins and the resurgence of hope. The story itself suffers at times, specifically in the opening pages, but the message at its heart is thought provoking enough to make up for any shortcomings." Haiden Sayne of CBR.com ranked the Adam: Legend of the Blue Marvel comic book series 9th in their "10 Marvel Comics That Deserve A Sequel" list.

== In other media ==
=== Television ===
Blue Marvel makes a non-speaking cameo appearance in the Moon Girl and Devil Dinosaur episode "Skip This Ad...olescence".

=== Video games ===
- Blue Marvel appears in Marvel: Avengers Alliance.
- Blue Marvel appears in Marvel Strike Force.
- Blue Marvel appears as a playable character in Lego Marvel's Avengers.
- Blue Marvel appears as a playable character in Lego Marvel Super Heroes 2.
- Blue Marvel appears as a playable character in Marvel: Future Fight.
- Blue Marvel appears in Marvel Snap.
