= Ultimates (2015) =

Marvel Comics superhero group

The Ultimates
- Cover art to Ultimates (vol. 3) #1

Publication information
- Publisher: Marvel Comics
- First appearance: Avengers (vol. 6) #0 (October 2015)
- Created by: Al Ewing; Kenneth Rocafort

In-story information
- Member(s): Blue Marvel; Black Panther; Captain Marvel; Miss America; Spectrum

The Ultimates is a superhero group appearing in American comic books published by Marvel Comics. Although the team takes its name from the unrelated team Ultimates, which was the Ultimate Marvel version of the Avengers, it is set in the standard Marvel Universe. The title has been used for two volumes, both written by Al Ewing. The first was part of All-New, All-Different Marvel and the second as part of Marvel NOW!. Both volumes have the same team and their goal is to protect Earth and the larger universe from cosmic threats.

== Publication history ==
In February 2015, Marvel announced that it would be fusing its mainstream universe and Ultimate universe into one following its crossover event, Secret Wars. Its post-Secret Wars branding would be dubbed All-New, All-Different Marvel, where 55 to 60 titles would be a part of this new universe. In late June 2015, a catalogue of 45 of these titles was shipped out to retailers, which quickly were posted online. One of these titles was Ultimates, featuring the cover of the first issue, its team of writer Al Ewing and artist Kenneth Rocafort, and a tagline, which read "Ultimate Problems need Ultimate solutions." The team borrows its name from the original Ultimates, who were the Avengers of the Ultimate universe. On utilizing the name, Ewing told Comics Alliance,

...they’re the ultimate super team, solving the ultimate problems. They’re generally pretty ultimate. And The Ultimates is a fine name for a book—it says it all, really. I don’t see a need to retire it just because the universe it came from is no longer with us."

The team also features an uncommon practice in modern media of having no Caucasian men, the team being diverse in both race and gender. On the team's diversity, Ewing said,

I think it's important in the way that a roof is important. If you're moving into a building and the landlord says 'oh, and we have—get this—a roof! And four walls! We're not just a hole someone dug in the street!', you don't start giving out medals for that. That's just a basic thing that ought to be standard. It's just fiction reflecting reality—there are all kinds of people in the world, and we should reflect that properly and try not to screw up. To be honest, I think there's a long way to go in a lot of ways, both on the page and off."

In Marvel NOW! (2016), the Ultimates broke up but are later reunited and asked to become the heralds of Galactus, who is now the Lifebringer of Worlds. The second volume ended at a special #100 issue and it includes an appearance of the original Ultimates team.

== Fictional team biography ==
Black Panther, Blue Marvel, Spectrum, Ms. America, and Captain Marvel come together to deal with cosmic threats to Earth and the larger universe.

The Ultimates begin their mission by dealing with Galactus. They retrieve Galactus' incubator and force him into it. This time, Galactus emerges from it as a lifebringer instead of a Devourer of Worlds. His first act is to restore Archeopia, the first victim of his hunger.

While the Ultimates are in Exo-Space, they encounter Blue Marvel's old enemy Anti-Man, whose body has reassembled there. Although Blue Marvel wants to kill Anti-Man, having deemed him too dangerous, he ends up sparing him and brings him back to the Abeona so that he and the Ultimates can heal him.

During the Civil War II storyline, Ulysses Cain receives a vision that tips off Blue Marvel about Infinaut's ninth manifestation attempt, enabling him, Giant-Man, and the Ultimates to work on a Pym Particle accelerator within a week. The Ultimates used the Pym Particle accelerator to anchor Infinaut and shrink him down to human size.

During the Secret Empire storyline, the Ultimates assist the Guardians of the Galaxy, the Alpha Flight Space Program, Hyperion, and Quasar into fighting the Chitauri that are approaching Earth. When the Planetary Defense Shield is activated as part of Hydra's plans to take over the United States, the Ultimates and those with them are trapped outside the Planetary Defense Shield as they continue their fight against the Chitauri.

When the Maker collaborated with High Evolutionary to destroy the Superflow that kept the different universes separate in order to merge them into one reality, the Earth-1610 Ultimates members Captain America, Iron Man, Giant-Man, Wasp, and Hulk were revived where they were to help Eternity fight the First Firmament. When Earth-616's version of the Ultimates arrived on Counter-Earth to confront Maker about his actions, he ordered the Earth-1610 Ultimates to attack. As both versions of Ultimates concluded that there is no reason to fight each other, Maker killed the Earth-1610 Captain America for disobeying his orders. Upon Maker being defeated, both Ultimates helped Eternity to break free from the First Firmament, giving Galactus and his Eternity Watch the chance to defeat the Aspirants. Eternity subsequently summoned the embodiment's of the past Multiverses to his aid. These "Ultimate Ultimates" chained the First Firmament and took it away to another plane of existence in hopes to heal it. With Eternity rescued, Galactus and the Ultimates bid farewell, and parted to go on their separate ways.

== Collected editions ==
Ultimates has been collected in the several trade paperbacks.

Title	Material collected	Publication date	ISBN
Ultimates: Omniversal Volume 1: Start With the Impossible	Ultimates (vol. 3) #1-6, and material from Avengers (vol. 6) #0	July 19, 2016	0-7851-9670-6
Ultimates: Omniversal Volume 2: Civil War II	Ultimates (vol. 3) #7-12	January 3, 2017	0-7851-9671-4
Ultimates 2 Volume 1: Troubleshooters	Ultimates 2 (vol. 2) #1-6	July 3, 2017	1-302-90675-5
Ultimates 2 Volume 2: Eternity War	Ultimates 2 (vol. 2) #7-9, 100	December 5, 2017	1-302-90676-3
Ultimates by Al Ewing: The Complete Collection	Ultimates (vol. 3) #1-12, Ultimates 2 (vol. 2) #1-9, 100, and material from Avengers (vol. 6) #0	July 27, 2021	978-1-302-92992-3
