= Dan DiDio =

American comic book editor

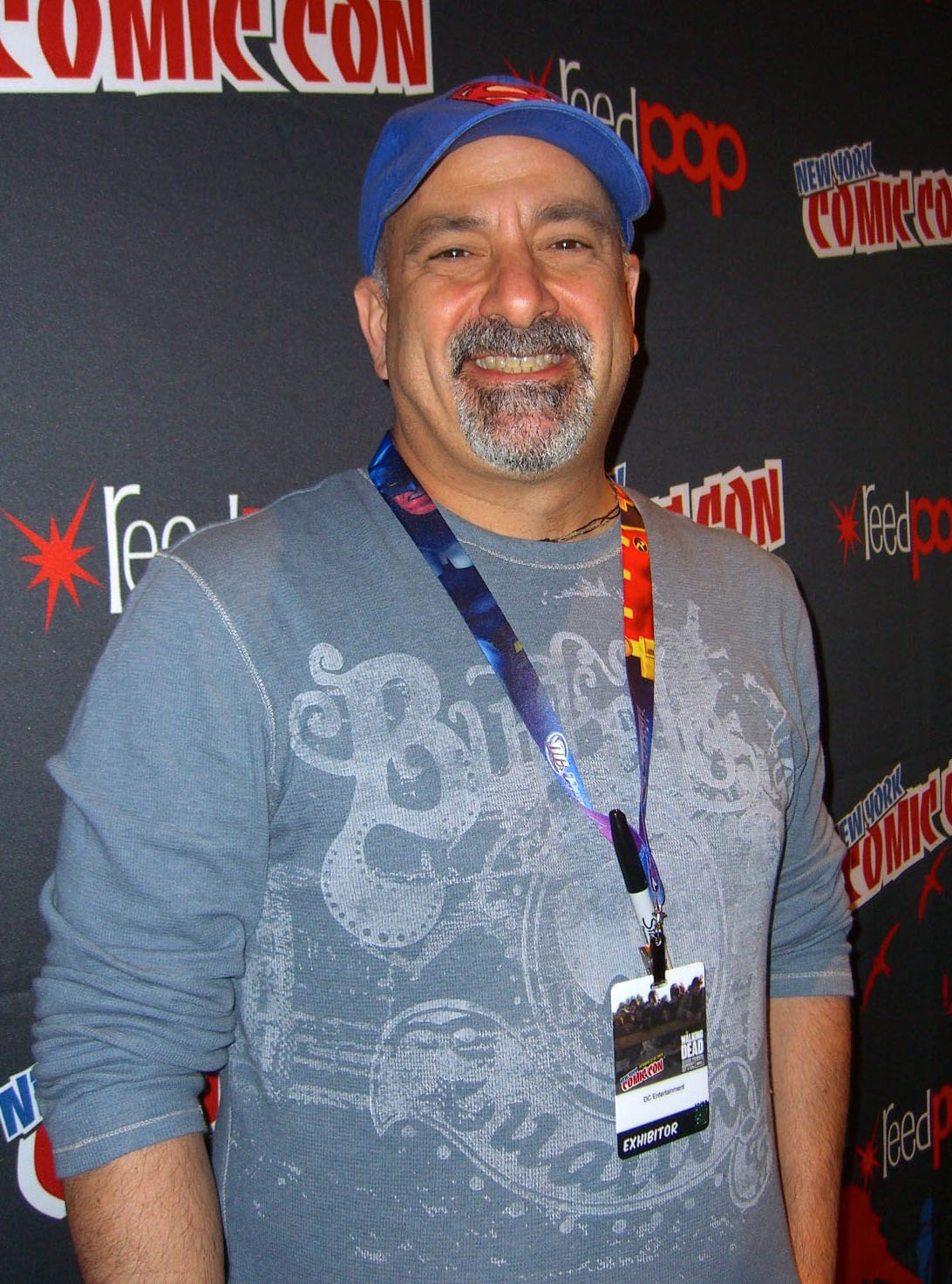
- DiDio at the 2012 New York Comic Con
- Born: October 13, 1959 (age 67) New York City, U.S.
- Areas: Writer, editor, publisher
- Notable works: ReBoot, DC Comics

Dan DiDio (/dɪˈdiːoʊ/; born October 13, 1959) is an American writer, editor, and publisher who has worked in the television and comic book industries. From February 2010 until February 2020, he was the co-publisher of DC Comics, along with Jim Lee. Wizard magazine recognized him as its first ever "Man of the Year" in 2003 for his work in the DC Universe line of comics.

== Career ==
=== TV work ===
Prior to joining DC Comics, DiDio worked in television, beginning in 1981. DiDio was a freelance writer and story editor for Mainframe Entertainment, specifically working on ReBoot and War Planets.

=== DC Comics ===
DiDio joined DC Comics in January 2002, as vice president–editorial, as well as writer for Superboy (issues #94 to 100). He was promoted to vice president–executive editor, DC Universe in October 2004. In 2006, DiDio began writing a weekly column called "DC Nation" which appeared on the end page of most of DC Comics' main superhero titles. Originally, the column was tied to 52, a project he was overseeing. On February 18, 2010, DC Entertainment President Diane Nelson named DiDio as co-publisher of DC Comics, along with Jim Lee.

Dan DiDio returned to writing comics with short stories for the 2008 and 2009 DC Halloween specials and the 2009 Holiday special. In 2009, he wrote the weekly Metal Men feature in Wednesday Comics. In January 2010, DiDio wrote the Weird Western Tales tie-in issue of the Blackest Night crossover and took over regular monthly scripting of The Outsiders. As co-publisher, he oversaw the reboot of all current DC titles and was the co-writer of the OMAC series with artist Keith Giffen. DiDio wrote a Challengers of the Unknown storyline for DC Universe Presents which was drawn by Jerry Ordway.

In July 2012, as part of San Diego Comic-Con, DiDio and DC co-publisher Jim Lee participated in the production of "Heroic Proportions", an episode of the Syfy reality television competition series Face Off, in which special effects makeup artists compete to create the best makeup according to each episode's theme. Lee and DiDio presented the contestants with that episode's challenge, to create a new superhero, with six DC Comics artists on hand to help them develop their ideas. The winning entry's character, Infernal Core by Anthony Kosar, was featured in Justice League Dark #16 (March 2013), which was published January 30, 2013. The episode premiered on January 22, 2013, as the second episode of the fourth season.

A Phantom Stranger ongoing series written by DiDio and drawn by Brent Anderson began in September 2012. DiDio and Keith Giffen reunited on Infinity Man and the Forever People in 2014. DiDio, Justin Jordan, and Kenneth Rocafort created the Sideways series as part of DC's "Dark Matter" line.

On February 21, 2020, DiDio stepped down as co-publisher of DC Comics after ten years at that position. The company did not give a reason for the move, nor did it indicate whether it was his decision or the company's, though it was the latest event in a restructuring that began the previous month, as several top executives were laid off from the company. However, Bleeding Cool reported that he was fired.

=== Frank Miller Presents ===
On April 28, 2022, it was announced that Dan DiDio would serve as publisher for Frank Miller's newly announced comic book company Frank Miller Presents (FMP).

DiDio created and wrote the mini-series Ancient Enemies alongside several one-shots set in the same universe.

=== IDW Publishing ===
In 2016, DiDio contributed to IDW's Love is Love benefit anthology, meant to honour those killed in the Pulse nightclub shooting that same year.

=== Mad Cave Studios ===
In 2024, it was announced that Dan DiDio would be writing an 8 issue Defenders of the Earth series for Mad Cave Studios, acting as a continuation of the classic cartoon.Mad Cave Studios published Defenders of the Earth: Dark Destiny from 2025-2026, written by DiDio and acting as a continuation of the 2024 series.

DiDio would contribute stories to issues 2-3 of Mad Cave's Flash Gordon Quarterly from 2024-2025.

In 2025, Dan DiDio would contribute to Mad Cave Studios' LA Strong benefit anthology, meant to aid creators who lost their homes in the 2025 Southern California wildfires.

In October 2026, it was announced that DiDio will be writing a Secret Agent X-9 series for Mad Cave Comics, with the first issue set to release in January 2027.

=== Inkwell Awards Special Ambassador ===
On August 23, 2022, Dan DiDio became the new Special Ambassador to the Inkwell Awards advocacy group.

== Bibliography ==
=== DC ===
- Adam Strange/Future Quest Special #1 (2017)
- Batman and the Outsiders vol. 2 #40 (2011)
- Batman Black and White vol. 2 #2 (2013)
- Batman Incorporated Special #1 (2013)
- DC Holiday Special 2017 #1 (2017)
- DC Infinite Halloween Special #1 (2007)
- DC Universe Presents #6–8 (Challengers of the Unknown); #0 (OMAC) (2012)
- DC's I Know What You Did Last Crisis #1 ('Crisis Obscura') (2024)
- DCU Halloween Special #1 (2008)
- DCU Holiday Special #1 (2009)
- Dog Days of Summer #1 ('Panic at the Midnight Rodeo!')
- Frankenstein, Agent of S.H.A.D.E #5 (2012)
- Infinity-Man and the Forever People #1–9 (2014–2015)
- Infinity-Man and the Forever People: Futures End #1 (2014)
- The Kamandi Challenge #1 ('The Rules') (2017)
- Justice League Dark # 23.1– 23.2 (2013)
- Justice League International Annual vol. 2 #1 (2012)
- Manhunter Special #1 ('Bring Me a Dream!') (2017)
- Metal Men vol. 4 #1-12 (2019–2020)
- O.M.A.C. vol. 3 #1–8 (2011–2012)
- Outsiders vol. 4 #26–39 (2010–2011)
- Phantom Stranger vol. 4 #0, #1–8 (2012–2013)
- Sideways #1–13 (2018–2019)
- Superboy vol. 3 #94–100 (2002)
- Superman/Top Cat Special ('...The Kalien Among Us!') (2018)
- Svengoolie Meets The DC Universe #1 (2019)
- Trinity of Sin: The Phantom Stranger: Futures End #1 (2014)
- Wednesday Comics #1–12 (Metal Men) (2009)
- Weird Western Tales #71 (2010)

=== Frank Miller Presents ===
- Ancient Enemies #1-6 (2022-2023)
- Ancient Enemies: The Dijinni #1 (2023)
- Ancient Enemies: The First Responder #1 (2023)
- Ancient Enemies: The Greater Good #1 (2023)
- Ancient Enemies: The Wraith and Son #1 (2023)
- Frank Miller Presents Ashcan Edition #1 (2022)

=== IDW Publishing ===
- Love is Love TP (Untitled Short Story) (2016)

=== Mad Cave Studios ===
- Defenders of Earth #1-8 (2024-2025)
- Defenders of Earth: Dark Destiny #1-4 (2025)
- Flash Gordon Quarterly #2-3 (2024-2025)
- LA Strong #1 (Unnamed Short Story) (2025)
- Secret Agent X-9 (2027)

== Television ==
Series head writer denoted in bold

- **ReBoot** (1997–1999): season 3
- **Shadow Raiders** (1998–1999)

Preceded by Paul Levitz	Publisher of DC Comics; 2010–2020; With: Jim Lee	Succeeded by Jim Lee
Preceded by Mike Carlin	DC Universe Executive Editor; 2002–2010	Succeeded by Eddie Berganza
Preceded by Karl Kesel	Superboy vol. 3 writer 2002–2003	Succeeded by n/a
Preceded by Peter Tomasi	The Outsiders vol. 4 writer 2010–2011	Succeeded by n/a
