= Civil War II =

2016 Marvel Comics crossover event

- Cover of Civil War II #1 (June 2016). Art by Marko Djurdjevic.

Publication information
- Publisher: Marvel Comics
- Format: Limited series
- Genre: Superhero
- Publication date: June – December 2016
- No. of issues: 8
- Main character(s): Captain Marvel; Iron Man; Ulysses Cain

Creative team
- Written by: Brian Michael Bendis
- Artist: David Marquez
- Letterer: Clayton Cowles
- Colorist: Justin Ponsor
- Editor: Tom Brevoort

Collected editions
- Civil War II: ISBN 978-1-302-90156-1

Civil War II is a 2016 comic book crossover storyline published by Marvel Comics. Debuting in June of that year, it is the sequel to 2006's "Civil War" and consists of a nine-issue eponymous core limited series, by writer Brian Michael Bendis and artists David Marquez and Justin Ponsor, and a number of tie-in books. Functioning as an allegory about the nature of determinism versus free will, the story sees opposing factions of superheroes led by Captain Marvel and Iron Man come into conflict when a new Inhuman named Ulysses emerges with the ability to predict the future. The debut of the series was scheduled to capitalize on the release of the 2016 Marvel Studios film Captain America: Civil War.

The storyline was preluded by a series of comic books collectively titled The Road to Civil War II. Civil War II also ties into several new limited series including: Civil War II: Amazing Spider-Man, Civil War II: Choosing Sides, Civil War II: Gods of War, Civil War II: Kingpin, Civil War II: Ulysses, and Civil War II: X-Men, the one-shots: Civil War II: The Accused and Civil War II: The Fallen, and numerous ongoing series. The storyline was succeeded by the one-shot Civil War II: The Oath.

Civil War II received mixed reviews from critics and modest yet declining sales figures from its high in June 2016 to its end in December. The repercussions of the storyline resulted in the new status quo of the Marvel Universe presented in the subsequent "Divided We Stand" storyline, which was released as part of the company's 2016 Marvel NOW! relaunch.

== Publication history ==
In December 2015, Marvel Comics announced the details of Civil War II, whose core miniseries would be produced by writer Brian Michael Bendis, artist David Marquez, colorist Justin Ponsor, and editor Tom Brevoort. The series, which debuted in June 2016, is a sequel to the 2006 "Civil War" storyline which pitted Iron Man against Captain America (Steve Rogers) in a conflict about national security versus civil liberties. Brevoort, who also edited the first series, stated, "The attempt was to craft the conflict so that each side held a valid and defensible position, so that a reader could fundamentally agree with either one side or the other, with neither being painted as absolutely right or absolutely wrong. While the issues involved are different, we'll be taking the same approach to Civil War II." Bendis, who wrote the New Avengers tie-in issues for the original "Civil War" storyline, stated that he only agreed to write the sequel after Mark Millar and Steve McNiven, the creators of the 2006 miniseries, turned it down.

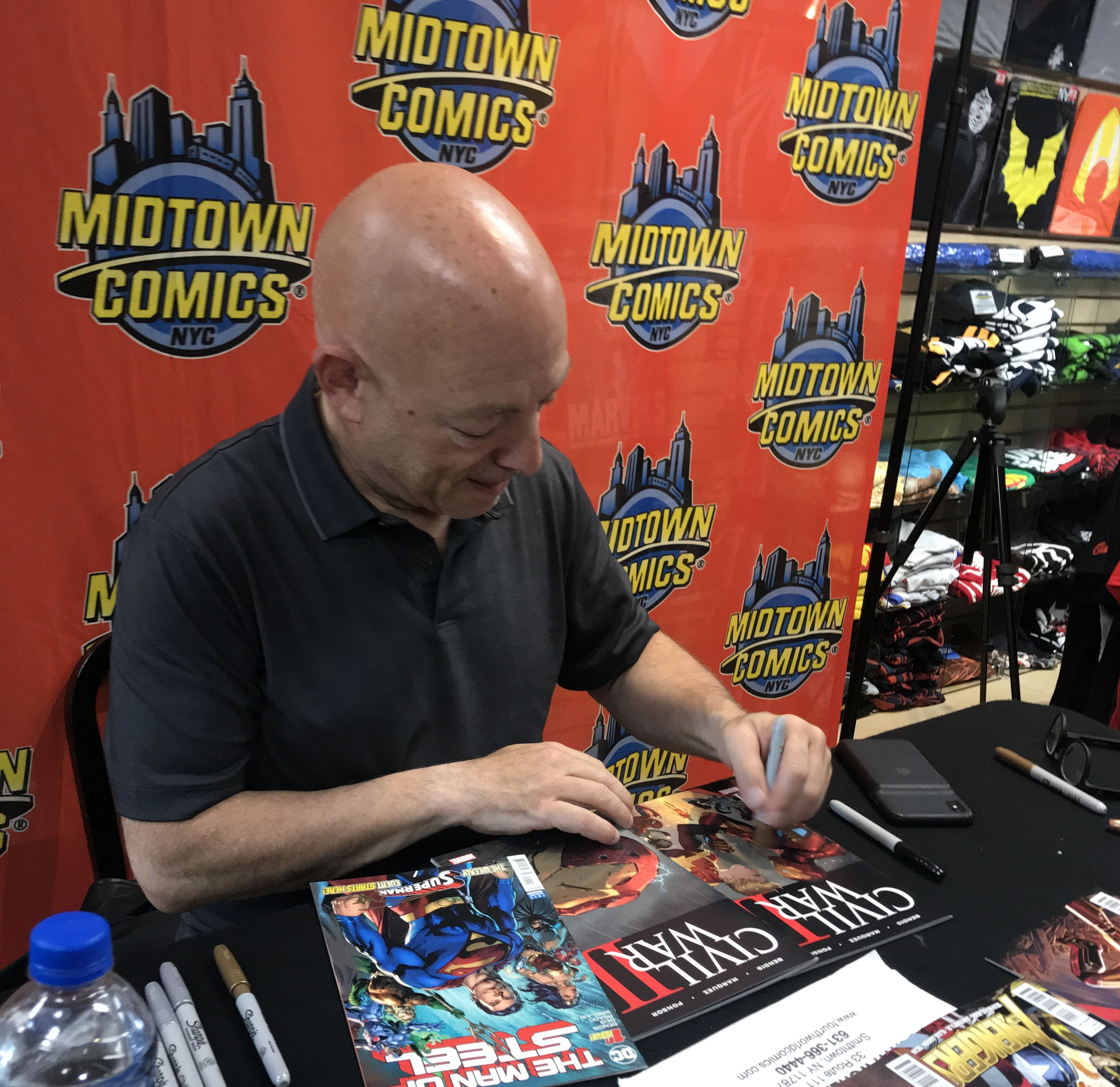
Writer Brian Michael Bendis signing copies of the central miniseries' first issue at Midtown Comics in Manhattan

The idea of the sequel was conceived at one of Marvel's semi-annual editorial retreats. Axel Alonso, editor-in-chief of Marvel Comics, stated that unlike other major comic book storylines which take years of planning, he only had three to four months to plan Civil War II. This abbreviated timetable was necessary in order to capitalize on the release of the feature film Captain America: Civil War, which was released in May 2016. The plot for Civil War II began to develop in the second volume of The Invincible Iron Man, which is also written by Bendis and drawn by Marquez.

In March 2016, Marvel revealed which characters will appear on the opposing factions. They also revealed two spin-off series: Civil War II: Spider-Man from writer Christos Gage and artist Travel Foreman, and Civil War II: X-Men from writer Cullen Bunn and artist Andrea Broccardo. Bunn explained, "This tale is set into motion by the same catalyst that sets Civil War II into motion. A new power emerges among the Inhumans. This power, in Magneto's eyes, could be very dangerous to the mutant population, so—in typical Master of Magnetism fashion—he decides to take it for himself. As you can imagine, something like that could very easily start a war between the Inhumans and the mutants. Storm sees this and decides to stand in Magneto's way." In Civil War II: Amazing Spider-Man, Spider-Man helps a precognitive Inhuman use his powers responsibly. "Over the course of the miniseries, the Inhuman will make a prediction that, while not of the world-or universe-ending variety, could well mean the end of one character's world. It's really dealing with classic Spider-Man themes: power and responsibility; facing a situation where even if you win, you can also lose – or you can just lose," Gage elaborated.

At the 2016 Chicago Comic & Entertainment Expo in March, two additional spin-off series were announced: Civil War II: Choosing Sides, an anthology series by Declan Shalvey which will feature a different character in each issue and have an overarching story involving Nick Fury; and Civil War II: Gods of War by writer Dan Abnett and artist Luke Ross, which stars Hercules. Abnett said, "Hercules is going to get involved more on a personal level in terms of his individual friendships with people rather than specifically taking a side because he objects to the whole thing anyway. He doesn't want to be taking a side." Marvel also named ten additional tie-in series: All-New Wolverine, Captain America: Sam Wilson, Deadpool, Invincible Iron Man, Ms. Marvel, The New Avengers, Nova, Totally Awesome Hulk, Ultimates, and Uncanny Inhumans.

The following month, Marvel announced Civil War II: Kingpin by writer Matthew Rosenberg and artist Ricardo Lopez Ortiz. Rosenberg said, "Wilson Fisk is an opportunist, first and foremost. Under his selfish motives, his brutal exterior, or even the facade he puts up as a pillar of his community, he is a man who sees ways to benefit himself and he takes them ... He wants to get whatever he can, however he can, and see how far he can push things. He is in the business of furthering Wilson Fisk, and the new Civil War will provide him a unique opportunity. He is a Civil War profiteer."

In May 2016, Marvel released additional prelude stories in a Free Comic Book Day edition by Bendis and artist Jim Cheung, and a zero issue by Bendis and artist Oliver Coipel. Also in May, details were shared on a three issue tie-in series titled Civil War II: Ulysses from writer Al Ewing and artist Jefte Palo. The series focuses on Ulysses Cain, the new Inhuman with the power to predict the future at the center of Civil War II. Ewing described the series as "a prequel of sorts", explaining, "we're following Ulysses as he's taken to the Tower of Wisdom – a sort of Inhuman temple of learning, for want of a better term – to be trained by Karnak, whose Inhuman ability is to see the flaw in all things. Karnak's training methods might be more than Ulysses can handle, though." The next month, Alonso said Civil War II would set a new status quo in the Marvel Universe, which would be presented in the "Divided We Stand" storyline as part of the company's 2016 Marvel NOW! relaunch.

In July 2016, Marvel announced three additional one-shots: Civil War II: The Accused, Civil War II: The Fallen, and Civil War II: The Oath. Civil War II: The Accused, by Marc Guggenheim and Ramon Bachs, follows the events of Civil War II #3 and depicts the trial of Hawkeye for killing the Hulk with Daredevil as lead prosecutor. Guggenheim described the book as a legal thriller saying, "The way I pitched this to Marvel was that it is a 30-page Scott Turow novel. But at the same time it is also a comic book." Civil War II: The Fallen, by Greg Pak and Mark Bagley, takes place at the Hulk's funeral. Civil War II: The Oath, by Nick Spencer and Rod Reis, is an epilogue story that parallels Civil War: The Confession #1 (May 2007), the epilogue of the original Civil War, which featured the final conversation between Iron Man and Steve Rogers. In The Oath, Iron Man and Captain Marvel turn to Rogers, the one person that they both trust.

In August 2016, Bendis stated issue #5 was delayed due to the birth of Marquez's son and that Marvel extended the series to eight issues, explaining, "David [Marquez] has been handing in about a page a day for the last couple of weeks so we're getting back on track. So much so that Marvel greenlit an 8th issue for us. I came up with a better ending but needed the pages. Very grateful that they let us do our thing." The delay also caused the remaining issues to be pushed back with issue #8 being released in December 2016.

== Plot ==
Ulysses Cain, a student at the Ohio State University, is exposed to the Terrigen Mist, which turns him into an Inhuman. When he emerges, Ulysses has a vision of a dystopian future.

Weeks later, the Inhumans help the Avengers defeat an invading Celestial Destroyer. After Ulysses reveals to the Avengers that he foresaw the invasion, Iron Man protests the logic of stopping crimes before they occur and leaves in frustration. Three weeks later, War Machine is killed and She-Hulk is mortally wounded in battle with Thanos. When he learns that they used Ulysses' precognitive power to ambush Thanos, Iron Man vows to make sure that nobody uses it again. As She-Hulk goes into cardiac arrest, she tells Captain Marvel to fight for the future.

Iron Man kidnaps Ulysses from New Attilan, home of the Inhumans. In response, the Inhumans attack Stark Tower, but are halted by the Avengers. To avoid further incident, they agree to confront Iron Man together at the secret facility where he has been running tests on Ulysses. During the confrontation, Ulysses has a vision of Hulk killing the Avengers.

Later, Bruce Banner, Hulk's former alter ego, is approached by Captain Marvel at his laboratory outside Alpine, Utah. Captain Marvel asks Banner to step outside where the Avengers are waiting to confront him. During the confrontation, Hawkeye shoots Banner dead and is immediately arrested.

At Hawkeye's trial, Hawkeye testifies that Banner approached him months earlier and asked that he kill him should Banner ever lose control. After Hawkeye is acquitted of all charges, Iron Man informs the other heroes of his test results: Ulysses' power is based on probability calculations, not absolute truth. Unpersuaded, Captain Marvel returns to the Triskelion, headquarters of the Ultimates, to continue her investigation of a suspected Hydra agent. There, Captain Marvel, the Ultimates, Alpha Flight, and Storm's X-Men are confronted by Iron Man, the Avengers, and Magneto's X-Men. Outnumbered, Captain Marvel calls in the Guardians of the Galaxy as back up as Iron Man's team is about to attack.

As the battle escalates, the Inhumans arrive to aid Captain Marvel while Ulysses has a vision of Miles Morales killing Steve Rogers. In reaction, Captain Marvel places Morales under arrest. While Iron Man and Captain Marvel argue the merits of arresting Morales, Rogers gives Morales the opportunity to decide for himself and Morales asks to go home. As Morales leaves, Maria Hill places Iron Man's team under arrest but Doctor Strange teleports them to one of Nick Fury's safehouses. At the safehouse, the younger Avengers sneak off to find Morales before the adults. Meanwhile, Hill receives communication that Morales is at the United States Capitol, the location seen in Ulysses' vision.

Ulysses has a vision of himself in the wasteland of an unknown future and meeting an older Wolverine. Wolverine tells Ulysses that the Inhumans have left the planet because Iron Man "pushed her too far." When the vision is over, Ulysses warns Medusa, queen of the Inhumans, about what he saw. Meanwhile, Rogers approaches Morales at the Capitol to gain some understanding about Ulysses' vision.

As Captain Marvel arrives to take Morales into custody, Iron Man intercepts and attacks Captain Marvel. Medusa warns the other heroes of Ulysses' vision and they try in vain to stop the fight. After Captain Marvel delivers a seemingly fatal blow to Iron Man, Ulysses has multiple visions of possible futures. Ulysses is then approached by Eternity and takes a place at his side as a new cosmic entity. Later, Captain Marvel meets with the President of the United States and is offered unlimited resources to lead the superhero community into the future.

== Titles involved ==
| Title | Issue(s) | Creative Team |
Road to Civil War II
| All-New Wolverine | #8–9 | Tom Taylor (W), Marcio Takara (A) |
| Invincible Iron Man | #7–11 | Brian Michael Bendis (W), Mike Deodato Jr. (A) |
| Ms. Marvel | #7 | G. Willow Wilson (W), Takeshi Miyazawa (A) |
| Ultimates | #7 | Al Ewing (W), Kenneth Rocafort (A) |
Main Series
| Civil War II | Free Comic Book Day 2016 (Civil War II) | Brian Michael Bendis (W), Jim Cheung (A) |
| Civil War II | #0–8 | Brian Michael Bendis (W), David Marquez (A) |
Tie-ins
| Civil War II: The Accused | #1 | Marc Guggenheim (W), Ramon Bachs (A) |
| Civil War II: Amazing Spider-Man | #1–4 | Christos N. Gage (W), Travel Foreman (A) |
| Civil War II: Choosing Sides | #1–6 | Various (W), Declan Shalvey & Various (A) |
| Civil War II: The Fallen | #1 | Greg Pak (W), Mark Bagley (A) |
| Civil War II: Gods of War | #1–4 | Dan Abnett (W), Emilio Laiso (A) |
| Civil War II: Kingpin | #1–4 | Matthew Rosenberg (W), Ricardo Lopez Ortiz (A) |
| Civil War II: The Oath | #1 | Nick Spencer (W), Rod Reis (A) |
| Civil War II: Ulysses | #1–3 | Al Ewing (W), Jefte Palo (A) |
| Civil War II: X-Men | #1–4 | Cullen Bunn (W), Andrea Broccardo (A) |
| A-Force | #8–10 | Kelly Thompson (W), Paulo Siqueira (A) |
| Agents of S.H.I.E.L.D. | #7–10 | Marc Guggenheim (W), German Peralta (A) |
| All-New All Different Avengers | #13–15 | Mark Waid (W), Adam Kubert (A) |
| All-New Wolverine | #10–12 | Tom Taylor (W), Marcio Takara (A) |
| Captain America: Sam Wilson | #10–13 | Nick Spencer (W), Angel Unzueta (A) |
| Captain America: Steve Rogers | #4–6 | Nick Spencer (W), Jesus Saiz (A) |
| Captain Marvel | #6–10 | Tara Butters (W), Michele Fazekas (A) |
| Deadpool | #14–18 | Gerry Duggan (W), Mike Hawthorne (A) |
| Guardians of the Galaxy | #11–13 | Brian Michael Bendis (W), Valerio Schiti (A) |
| International Iron Man | #4 | Brian Michael Bendis (W), Alex Maleev (A) |
| Invincible Iron Man | #12–14 | Brian Michael Bendis (W), Mike Deodato Jr. (A) |
| Mockingbird | #6–8 | Chelsea Cain (W), Kate Niemczyk (A) |
| Ms. Marvel | #8–11 | G. Willow Wilson (W), Takeshi Miyazawa (A) |
| New Avengers | #12–17 | Al Ewing (W), Gerardo Sandoval (A) |
| Nova | #8–9 | Sean Ryan (W), R. B. Silva (A) |
| Patsy Walker AKA Hellcat! | #8 | Kate Leth (W), Brittney Williams (A) |
| Power Man and Iron Fist | #6–9 | David F. Walker (W), Flaviano Armentaro (A) |
| Rocket Raccoon & Groot | #8–10 | Nick Kocher (W), Michael Walsh (A) |
| Scarlet Witch | #9 | James Robinson (W), Joëlle Jones (A) |
| Spider-Man | #6–10 | Brian Michael Bendis (W), Sara Pichelli (A) |
| Spider-Man 2099 | #13–16 | Peter David (W), William Sliney (A) |
| Spider-Woman | #9–11 | Dennis Hopeless (W), Javier Rodriguez (A) |
| Squadron Supreme | #9–12 | James Robinson (W), Leonard Kirk (A) |
| Thunderbolts | #5 | Jim Zub (W), Jon Malin (A) |
| Totally Awesome Hulk | #7–12 | Greg Pak (W), Alan Davis (A) |
| Ultimates | #8–12 | Al Ewing (W), Kenneth Rocafort (A) |
| Uncanny Avengers | #13–14 | Gerry Duggan (W), Ryan Stegman (A) |
| Uncanny Inhumans | #11–14 | Charles Soule (W), Carlos Pacheco (A) |
| Venom: Space Knight | #11–12 | Robbie Thompson (W), Gerardo Sandoval (A) |

== Collected editions ==
| Title | Material collected | Release date | ISBN |
|---|---|---|---|
| Civil War II | Civil War II #0–8, and material from Free Comic Book Day 2016 (Civil War II) #1 | February 14, 2017 | 978-1-302-90156-1 |
| Civil War II: Amazing Spider-Man | Civil War II: Amazing Spider-Man #1-4, and material from Amazing Spider-Man (vol. 3) #7-8 | November 22, 2016 | 978-1-302-90250-6 |
| Civil War II: Choosing Sides | Civil War II: Choosing Sides #1-6 | November 22, 2016 | 978-1-302-90251-3 |
| Civil War II: Gods of War | Civil War II: Gods of War #1-4, Journey Into Mystery Annual #1 | November 22, 2016 | 978-1-302-90034-2 |
| Civil War II: Kingpin | Civil War II: Kingpin #1-4, Amazing Spider-Man (vol. 1) #51 | November 29, 2016 | 978-1-302-90253-7 |
| Civil War II: X-Men | Civil War II: X-Men #1-4, Amazing Adventures # 9 | November 29, 2016 | 978-1-302-90254-4 |
| Civil War II: Fallout | Civil War II: Ulysses #1-3, Civil War II: The Fallen #1, Civil War II: The Accused #1, Civil War II: The Oath #1 | April 4, 2017 | 978-1-302-90239-1 |
| All-New, All-Different Avengers Vol. 3: Civil War II | All-New, All-Different Avengers #13-15, Annual #1 | February 8, 2017 | 978-1846537745 |
| All-New Wolverine Vol. 2: Civil War II | All-New Wolverine #7-12 | November 8, 2016 | 978-0785196532 |
| Captain America: Sam Wilson Vol. 3: Civil War II | Captain America: Sam Wilson #9-13 | January 26, 2017 | 978-1302903190 |
| Captain Marvel Vol. 2: Civil War II | Captain Marvel (vol. 9) #6-10 | April 14, 2017 | 978-0785196433 |
| Deadpool Vol. 5: Civil War II | Deadpool (vol. 6) #14-19 | December 21, 2017 | 978-1846537622 |
| Guardians of the Galaxy Vol. 3: Civil War II | Guardians of the Galaxy (vol. 4) #11-14, and material from Free Comic Book Day 2016 (Civil War II) #1 | February 28, 2017 | 978-1302903015 |
| Invincible Iron Man Vol. 3: Civil War II | Invincible Iron Man (vol. 3) #12-14, Mighty Avengers #9-11 | February 15, 2017 | 978-1846537691 |
| Ms. Marvel Vol. 6: Civil War II | Ms. Marvel (vol. 4) #7-12 | December 27, 2016 | 978-0785196129 |
| New Avengers Vol. 3: Civil War II | New Avengers (vol. 4) #12-16 | November 22, 2016 | 978-1302902353 |
| Power Man and Iron Fist Vol. 2: Civil War II | Power Man and Iron Fist (vol. 3) #6-9, Sweet Christmas Annual #1 | March 23, 2017 | 978-1302901158 |
| Rocket Raccoon & Groot Vol. 2: Civil War II | Rocket Raccoon & Groot #7-10 | November 22, 2016 | 978-0785199748 |
| Spider-Man 2099 Vol. 5: Civil War II | Spider-Man 2099 (vol. 3) #11-16 | January 31, 2017 | 978-1302902810 |
| Spider-Man: Miles Morales Vol. 2: Civil War II | Spider-Man (vol. 2) #6-11 | February 28, 2017 | 978-1846537714 |
| Spider-Woman Vol. 2 - Civil War II | Spider-Woman (vol. 6) #8-12 | January 10, 2017 | 978-0785196235 |
| Squadron Supreme Vol. 2: Civil War II | Squadron Supreme (vol. 4) #6-9 | November 29, 2016 | 978-0785199724 |
| Totally Awesome Hulk Vol. 2: Civil War II | Totally Awesome Hulk #7-12 | January 10, 2017 | 978-0785196105 |
| Ultimates Vol. 2: Civil War II | Ultimates (vol. 3) #6-11 | January 3, 2017 | 978-0785196716 |
| Uncanny Avengers Vol. 3: Civil War II | Uncanny Avengers (vol. 3) #13-17 | March 22, 2017 | 978-1846537752 |
| Uncanny Inhumans Vol. 3: Civil War II | Uncanny Inhumans #11-14, Annual #1 | November 29, 2016 | 978-0785199915 |

== Reception ==
=== Critical response ===
Aggregate scores
Comic Book Roundup
| Issue | Rating | Reviews | Ref. |
|---|---|---|---|
| 0 | 7.3/10 | 23 | |
| 1 | 7.3/10 | 26 | |
| 2 | 6.0/10 | 26 | |
| 3 | 6.3/10 | 23 | |
| 4 | 5.7/10 | 20 | |
| 5 | 5.7/10 | 19 | |
| 6 | 5.8/10 | 17 | |
| 7 | 6.3/10 | 15 | |
| 8 | 5.0/10 | 20 | |

According to the review aggregator website Comic Book Roundup, issue #0 received an average score of 7.3/10 based on 23 reviews from critics. Leia Calderon of Comic Book Resources (CBR) gave it four-out-of-five stars writing, "Overall, Bendis and Coipel's Civil War II #0 serves the sole purpose of laying out the foundation for the series. Despite being driven almost entirely by dialogue, it's never once boring, and the only real issue is the question on everyone's minds: Where is Iron Man?" Jesse Schedeen of IGN gave it an 8.3 out of 10 saying, "Between the lackluster FCBD Special and Marvel's general track record with major crossovers, there's plenty of reason to worry about Civil War II. But the good news is that this prologue issue makes a strong case for the upcoming event. It clearly lays out the brewing conflict and makes a strong case for both viewpoints." David Pepose of Newsarama gave it an 8 out of 10 and said, "Minor flaws in the premise aside, Bendis and Coipel deliver some surprisingly charming work with Civil War II #0, which — at least thus far — doesn't feel like the shameless cash-in that you might expect from this summer event sequel."

Issue #1 received an average score of 7.3/10 based on 26 reviews from critics on Comic Book Roundup. Greg McElhatton of CBR gave it four stars writing, "Overall, Civil War II #1 is a good launching point for this miniseries, even as it integrates the information from Civil War II #0 and the Free Comic Book Day special. I'm curious to see if Bendis and Marquez can maintain this level of tension and what they'll add into the mix to keep the conflict burning strong. For now, though, it's more than enough to get readers coming back for more." Schedeen gave it a 7.1 saying, "This first issue cleanly establishes the conflict and delivers a nonstop stream of gorgeous artwork. However, it offers few surprises for those not already familiar with the basics of this crossover, and it often fails to elicit a strong emotional response in the way the first issue of Civil War did ten years ago." Richard Gray of Newsarama gave it a 7 and said, "At this early stage, Civil War II suffers some of the problems that have beleaguered similar narratives in recent years, principally in seeing heroes all too quick to take sides against comrades on a possible future. Yet this is also just the beginning of something much larger, and while it may seem at times like this is an extended version of the 'zero' issue that preceded it, all the pieces are now in place for the 'war' proper to commence."

Issue #2 received an average score of 6.0/10 based on 26 reviews from critics on Comic Book Roundup. Schedeen gave it a 6.5 saying, "Given that this is technically the fourth Civil War II comic Bendis has written now, it's disappointing that the story is still in such a nascent stage. This isn't a civil war so much as 'Everybody is mad at Tony Stark.' Tony's characterization is sound, and the visuals in this book are downright fantastic, but those qualities aren't enough to give this Civil War sequel the spark it needs." Pepose gave it a 3 and said, "Right now, there's none of the thematic or dramatic weight of the original Civil War in this sequel, which is quickly burning off the initial goodwill from its zero issue and its Free Comic Book Day Special."

Issue #3 received an average score of 6.3/10 based on 23 reviews from critics on Comic Book Roundup. Schedeen gave it a 5.1 saying, "Civil War II looks every bit as good as you'd expect from Marvel's flagship event comic. Unfortunately, this series doesn't have nearly enough to offer beneath that gorgeous exterior. There's too much dialogue and exposition and not enough progress or dramatic weight to the story." Pepose gave it a 6 and said, "Civil War II #3 is a decent chapter of an event story that feels like plenty of other event stories. But as far as memorials go, it's unfortunately pretty forgettable fare."

Issue #4 received an average score of 5.7/10 based on 20 reviews from critics on Comic Book Roundup. Schedeen gave it a 7.3 saying, "Civil War II #4 picks up the pace and boasts more stunning art, but the characterization remains flawed." Pepose gave it a 3 and said, "I want to like this series. I want to like this story. But we're already halfway through this series, and Civil War II has barely even shown up."

Issue #5 received an average score of 5.7/10 based on 19 reviews from critics on Comic Book Roundup. Schedeen gave it a 4.4 saying, "This issue fixates on an extended superhero brawl that lacks dramatic weight (or even narrative logic) before transitioning into a very disappointing twist that threatens to derail the series for good." Pepose gave it an 8 and said, "While it appears that the superhero fisticuffs might be taking yet a breather[sic] after this chapter, it's hard to deny the sheer fun Civil War II #5 has to offer."

Issue #6 received an average score of 5.8/10 based on 17 reviews from critics on Comic Book Roundup. Schedeen gave it a 6.3 saying, "Civil War II has had trouble building momentum from the beginning, and this issue does nothing to address that problem. There are some strong emotional moments here, and plenty of stunning artwork from Marquez and Ponsor, but the sluggish pace and generally listless nature of the conflict continue to frustrate." Pepose gave it a 3 and said, "We have two issues left on this series, and judging by the cliffhanger, it might mean something - but at this point, Civil War II has largely been about circling a conflict rather than diving into it head-on, leaving this event book about as unsatisfying as it gets."

Issue #7 received an average score of 6.3/10 based on 15 reviews from critics on Comic Book Roundup. Schedeen gave it a 7.8 saying, "Issue #7 is easily one of the stronger chapters of Civil War II. That doesn't say a great deal at this point, but it is still nice to see Bendis focusing on a smaller, more intimate cast here." Pepose gave it a 6 and said, "With only one issue left to go, Civil War II remains a disappointing chapter for the House of Ideas. Even this series' biggest moments feel calculated rather than organic, trying to goose sales with a handful of character deaths without really digging in too deeply about the underlying issues underneath."

Issue #8 received an average score of 5.0/10 based on 20 reviews from critics on Comic Book Roundup. Schedeen gave it a 5.3 saying, "Civil War II ends with what is easily one of the weakest chapters of the entire crossover. This issue is anticlimactic and fails to wring much emotion from the final battle between Captain Marvel and Iron Man." Justin Partridge of Newsarama gave it a 3 and said, "To summarize, Civil War II #8 was basically an episode of Whose Line Is It Anyway?: Everything was made up and the stakes didn't matter ... Brian Michael Bendis, who has delivered some fantastic events in his long career, limps across the finish line in this eighth issue, employing a hefty bit of deus ex 'Cosmic Power of the Universe' for what can only be described as the opposite of a game changer."

=== Sales ===
Estimated number of copies sold in the debut month of each issue's release.
Number of copies by the nearest thousand

Civil War II #0 sold an estimated 177,283 copies in May 2016, making it the second best selling comic of the month behind DC Universe: Rebirth #1. Strong orders for the issue led Marvel to announce a second printing on May 5, thirteen days before the issue went on sale. In June 2016, issue #1 sold an estimated 381,737 copies, making it the best selling comic of the month, while issue #2 came in fifth place, selling an estimated 148,403 copies. In August, issue #3 came in fourth place, selling an estimated 176,876 copies, while issue #4 came in seventh place with 126,865 copies sold. In September, issue #5 debuted in fourth place, selling an estimated 120,208 copies. In October, issue #6 debuted in seventh place, selling an estimated 118,625 copies. In November, issue #7 debuted in third place, selling an estimated 116,446 copies. In December, issue #8 debuted in sixth place, selling an estimated 105,658 copies.

== In other media ==
=== Television ===
A storyline closely resembling Civil War II as it features Iron Man and the original Avengers and Captain Marvel and her team in opposition to each other was adapted in the four-part season finale of Avengers: Ultron Revolution. In this version of the storyline, the Registration Act targets new Inhumans, and teams of Avengers come into conflict over the issue, as in other adaptations. It is revealed in Part 3, however, that the Inhuman Registration Act is actually part of a plan by Ultron (disguised as Truman Marsh) to begin the Ultron Revolution by manipulating humans and Inhumans into destroying each other, which is foiled by the combined efforts of the Avengers.

=== Video game ===
The storyline was the inspiration for an add-on mission in Marvel: Avengers Alliance. In the mission, a powerful new Inhuman called "The Profiler" has a vision in which Doctor Doom terminates the Inhumans. As the Inhumans move to capture Doom before the event occurs, the Avengers become divided in regards to punishing crimes before they occur.
