= David Marquez (comics) =

American comic book artist

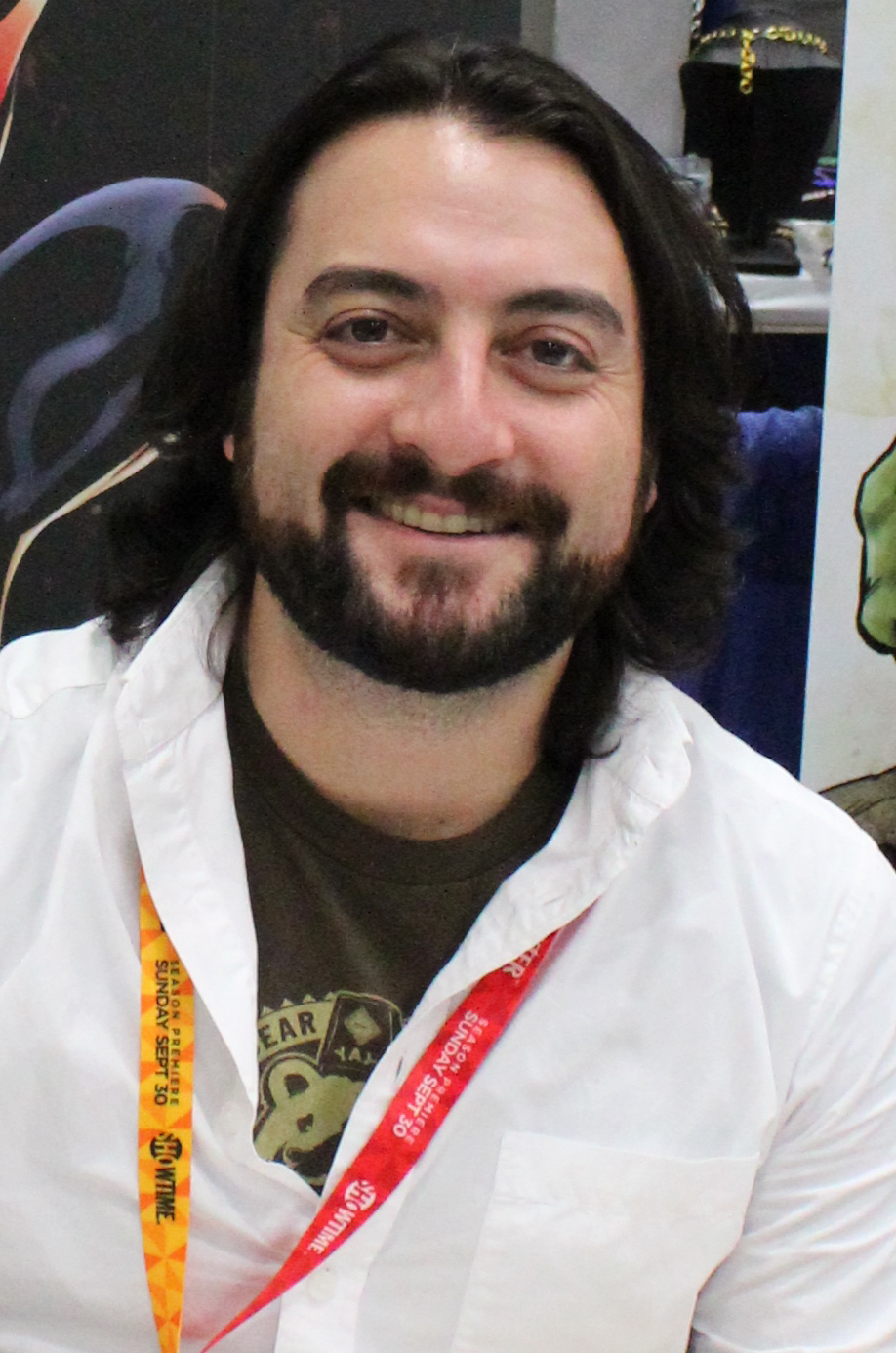
- Marquez at San Diego Comic-Con in July 2012
- Area: Artist
- Notable works: Ultimate Comics: Spider-Man; All-New X-Men

David Marquez is an American comic book artist best known for his works at Marvel such as Ultimate Comics: Spider-Man, and All-New X-Men, with writer Brian Michael Bendis as well as for his first creator-owned book, The Joyners in 3D, with writer R.J. Ryan (published through Archaia/BOOM! Studios in 2014).

== Career ==
Upon graduating from the University of Texas at Austin with degrees in History, Government, and a teaching certificate, David auditioned for a job doing rotoscope animation on Richard Linklater's A Scanner Darkly which he heard about through a weekly sketch group he attended in college. He got the animation job and credits this experience on A Scanner Darkly for showing him "how versatile a digital toolset can be".

David Marquez "always wanted to draw comics" so spent the next several years after finishing A Scanner Darkly both honing his drawing skills and seeking comics work at San Diego Comic-Con.

David draws primarily digitally, and his first published comic book illustration work was in Archaia's original graphic novel, Syndrome with writers Daniel Quantz and R. J. Ryan in 2010, followed by Days Missing Vol. 2: Kestus for which he received a Russ Manning Most Promising Newcomer Award nomination.

David's first Marvel work was with writer Jonathan Hickman on Secret Warriors #24, published in 2011. Shortly after, he began drawing Marvel's original graphic novel, Fantastic Four: Season One with writer Roberto Aguirre-Sacasa, published in 2012. Fantastic Four: Season One became a New York Times Best Seller toward the end of February that year. Shortly after, David began drawing Ultimate Comics Spider-Man with writer Brian Michael Bendis David's first creator-owned original graphic novel, The Joyners in 3D, was published in 2014 through Archaia/BOOM! Studios. Written by R.J. Ryan, David employed a different drawing style than his previous works. He worked in collaboration with artist Tara Rhymes to develop and execute the 3-D process the two used on the book.

As part of the All-New, All-Different Marvel relaunch of Marvel's titles, Marquez teamed with writer Brian Michael Bendis to launch the third volume of Invincible Iron Man in December 2015. Marquez drew the first five issues of the series.

He drew the Civil War II limited series in 2016, which was also written by Bendis.

In 2020 Marquez drew Bendis's story titled "The Master Class" for Detective Comics' 1027th issue.

== Personal life ==
David Marquez was born in London, England. He grew up in Norway and Scotland before moving to the Houston, Texas as a child. As of 2014, he resides in Austin, Texas with his wife, Tara (pronounced "Tahr-uh").

== Bibliography ==
=== Archaia ===
==== Pencils/inks ====
- Days Missing: Kestus #1-5 with writer Phil Hester (2010)
- Syndrome Original Graphic Novel with writers Daniel Quantz and R.J. Ryan (2010)
- The Joyners in 3D Original Graphic Novel with writer, R.J. Ryan (Archaia/BOOM! Studios, 2014)

=== DC Comics ===
==== Pencils/inks ====
- Detective Comics #1027 (story "The Master Class,") (2020)

=== Image Comics ===
==== Pencils/inks ====
- Outlaw Territory, Vol. 2 "Santa Fe" with writer Shay (2011)

==== Covers ====
- The CBLDF Presents Liberty Annual (Lady Liberty variant) (2014)

==== Colors ====
- Outlaw Territory, Vol. 2: Santa Fe (2011)

=== Marvel Comics ===
==== Pencils/inks ====
- Age of Ultron #10 with writer Brian Michael Bendis (2013)
- All-New X-Men #6-8, 25 with writer Brian Michael Bendis (2013)
- Cataclysm: Ultimate Comics Spider-Man #1-3 with writer Brian Michael Bendis (2013)
- Fantastic Four: Season One Original Graphic Novel with writer Roberto Aguirre-Sacasa (2012)
- Secret Warriors #24 with writer Jonathan Hickman (2011)
- Ultimate Comics Spider-Man #9-15, 16.1, 18, 23-28 with writer Brian Michael Bendis (2012-2014)
- Miles Morales: The Ultimate Spider-Man #1-12 with writer Brian Michael Bendis (2014)
- Invincible Iron Man #1-5 with writer Brian Michael Bendis (2015)
- Civil War II #1-8 with writer Brian Michael Bendis (2016)
- The Defenders vol. 5 #1-10 with writer Brian Michael Bendis (2017)

==== Covers ====
- Avengers A.I. #2-12 (2013-2014)
- Cataclysm: Ultimate Comics Spider-Man #1-3 (2013)
- Superior Spider-Man #28 variant (2014)
- Ultimate Comics Spider-Man #16,18,23-28 (2012-2013)
- Uncanny X-Men, Vol. 2 #20 variant (2013)
- X-Men #11 variant (2014)

=== Top Cow Productions ===
==== Pencils/inks ====
- The Magdalena #5,6,9-12 with writer Ron Marz (2011-2012)
- Pilot Season: Asset #1 with writer Filip Sablik (2010)

== Filmography ==
=== Animation ===
- A Scanner Darkly (2006)
