= Superman (Volume 3) =

Comic book series

Superman vol. 3
- Superman vol. 3, #1 (November 2011), art by George Pérez and Brian Buccellato.

Publication information
- Publisher: DC Comics
- Schedule: Monthly
- Format: Ongoing series
- Genre: Superhero
- Publication date: September 2011 – July 2016
- No. of issues: 57 (#1–52, plus issues #0 and #23.1-23.4), 1 Special and 3 Annuals
- Main character: Superman

Creative team
- Written by: George Pérez; Dan Jurgens; Keith Giffen; Scott Lobdell; Geoff Johns; Gene Luen Yang; Peter J. Tomasi
- Penciller(s): Kenneth Rocafort; George Pérez; Howard Porter; John Romita Jr.
- Inker: Klaus Janson

Superman is a comic book series featuring the DC Comics superhero of the same name. The second relaunch of the main Superman title, following the cancellation of the second volume in 2011, it began publication as part of DC's The New 52, a company-wide relaunch initiative and reboot following the Flashpoint limited series earlier that year, and the second full-on reboot following the 1986 maxiseries Crisis on Infinite Earths. It ran from 2011 to 2016, before being cancelled and relaunched as part of the DC Rebirth line.

== Publication history ==
DC Comics launched Superman volume 3 with issue #1 in September 2011 (cover dated November 2011), as part of The New 52. The first three issues saw George Pérez doing the scripting and breakdowns. Dan Jurgens began to co-write and draw Superman with Keith Giffen. Their first issue was #7 (May 2012). As of September 2012's issue #0, Scott Lobdell and Kenneth Rocafort became the creative team. John Romita Jr. drew the Superman series in collaboration with writer Geoff Johns in 2014. Romita's Superman pencils were inked by Klaus Janson. Superman's secret identity as Clark Kent was revealed to the world in a storyline by writer Gene Luen Yang in 2015. This series ended its run with the release of issue #52 (July 2016).

== Series Issues ==
=== Issues ===
- Superman #1-52 (2012–2016)

=== Annuals ===
- Superman Annual #1 (2012)
- Superman Annual #2 (2013)
- Superman Annual #3 (2016)

=== Specials ===
- Superman: Future's End #1 (2014)

=== Collections ===
#	Title	Material collected	Pages	Publication Date	ISBN
Paperback
1	What Price Tomorrow?	Superman (vol. 3) #1–6.	144	June 26, 2013	978-1401236861
2	Secrets and Lies	Superman (vol. 3) #7–12 and Annual #1.	176	January 8, 2014	978-1401242572
	H'El on Earth	Superman (vol. 3) #13–17, Superboy (vol. 6) #14–17 and Annual #1, and Supergirl (vol. 6) #14–17	328	June 18, 2014	978-1401246129
3	Fury at World's End	Superman (vol. 3) #13–17 and #0.	144	August 6, 2014	978-1401246228
4	Psi War	Superman (vol. 3) #18–24, Action Comics (vol. 2) #24 and Annual #2.	208	February 4, 2015	978-1401250942
5	Under Fire	Superman (vol. 3) #25–31.	176	August 5, 2015	978-1401255428
	Krypton Returns	Superman (vol. 3) #0, #25, #23.1: H'El, Action Comics (vol. 2) Annual #2, Superboy (vol. 6) #0 and #25, and Supergirl (vol. 6) #0 and #25.	208	August 12, 2015	978-1401258924
	Doomed	Superman: Doomed #1–2, Superman (vol. 3) #30–31, Action Comics (vol. 2) #30–35 and Annual #3, Superman/Wonder Woman #7–12 and Annual #1, Supergirl (vol. 6) #34–35, and Batman/Superman #11.	544	December 30, 2015	978-1401257699
6	The Men of Tomorrow	Superman (vol. 3) #32–39.	256	April 13, 2016	978-1401258689
1	Before Truth	Superman (vol. 3) #40–44 and a story from Divergence #1.	144	September 28, 2016	978-1401265106
2	Return to Glory	Superman (vol. 3) #45–52 and Annual #3.	320	March 8, 2017	978-1401268305
	The Final Days of Superman	Superman (vol. 3) #51–52, Action Comics (vol. 2) #51–52, Batman/Superman #31–32, and Superman/Wonder Woman #28–29.	200	May 24, 2017	978-1401269142
	Savage Dawn	Superman (vol. 3) #48–50 and Annual #3, Action Comics (vol. 2) #48–50, and Superman/Wonder Woman #25–27 and #30–31.	352	July 26, 2017	978-1401271251
Hardcover
1	What Price Tomorrow?	Superman (vol. 3) #1–6.	144	November 14, 2012	978-1401234683
2	Secrets and Lies	Superman (vol. 3) #7–12 and Annual #1.	176	June 26, 2013	978-1401240288
	H'El on Earth	Superman (vol. 3) #13–17, Superboy (vol. 6) #14–17 and Annual #1, and Supergirl (vol. 6) #14–17	328	November 27, 2013	978-1401243197
3	Fury at World's End	Superman (vol. 3) #13–17 and #0.	144	January 8, 2014	978-1401243203
4	Psi War	Superman (vol. 3) #18–24, Action Comics (vol. 2) #24 and Annual #2.	224	August 6, 2014	978-1401246235
5	Under Fire	Superman (vol. 3) #25–31.	168	February 4, 2015	978-1401250959
	Krypton Returns	Superman (vol. 3) #0, #25, #23.1: H'El, Action Comics (vol. 2) Annual #2, Superboy (vol. 6) #0 and #25, and Supergirl (vol. 6) #0 and #25.	208	February 11, 2015	978-1401249489
	Doomed	Superman: Doomed #1–2, Superman (vol. 3) #30–31, Action Comics (vol. 2) #30–35 and Annual #3, Superman/Wonder Woman #7–12 and Annual #1, Supergirl (vol. 6) #34–35, and Batman/Superman #11.	544	March 25, 2015	978-1401252403
6	The Men of Tomorrow	Superman (vol. 3) #32–39.	256	August 19, 2015	978-1401252397
1	Before Truth	Superman (vol. 3) #40–44 and a story from Divergence #1.	192	April 6, 2016	978-1401259815
2	Return to Glory	Superman (vol. 3) #45–52 and Annual #3.	320	September 28. 2016	978-1401265113
	Savage Dawn	Superman (vol. 3) #48–50 and Annual #3, Action Comics (vol. 2) #48–50, and Superman/Wonder Woman #25–27.	200	October 5, 2016	978-1401270049
	The Final Days of Superman	Superman (vol. 3) #51–52, Action Comics (vol. 2) #51–52, Batman/Superman #31–32, and Superman/Wonder Woman #28–29.	200	October 26, 2016	978-1401267223
