= Solstice (character) =

- Kiran in her first appearance as Solstice. Art by Adriana Melo, Mariah Benes and Marcelo Maiolo.

Publication information
- Publisher: DC Comics
- First appearance: Cameo; Teen Titans (vol. 3) #88 (October 2010); As Kiran; Teen Titans (vol. 3) #89 (November 2010); As Solstice; Wonder Girl (vol. 2) #1 (January 2011)
- Created by: J. T. Krul (writer); Nicola Scott (artist)

In-story information
- Alter ego: Kiran Singh
- Species: Metahuman
- Team affiliations: Teen Titans
- Abilities: Light manipulation Flight

Solstice (Kiran Singh) is a superhero published by DC Comics. The character has appeared as a new member in DC's long-running Teen Titans comic book series, and was created by JT Krul and Nicola Scott. Krul has described the character as being "a positive spirit - influenced by the various cultures she's encountered during her travels throughout the world. She embraces life and all the adventure and experiences it offers."

== Publication history ==
Solstice made her first appearance in Teen Titans (vol. 3) #88 in October 2010. The character was not named, but was shown alongside the new Aqualad as part of a montage showing future events that would affect the team in the coming issues. She made her first speaking appearance in the following issue, where her civilian name was given. The character made her first appearance as Solstice in Wonder Girl (vol. 2) #1, a one-shot comic released by DC in January 2011. Writer JT Krul confirmed that Solstice would be a regular character in the Teen Titans book.

== Fictional character biography ==
Kiran Singh is a teenager from Delhi, India and the daughter of archaeologists Vijay and Rani Singh. While visiting London, England with her parents to attend a conference, Kiran meets and befriends Cassie Sandsmark. The two visit a nearby museum exhibit just before it is attacked by a supervillain named Lady Zand. Just as Cassie reveals herself to be the superheroine Wonder Girl, Kiran creates a golden costume for herself and tells Cassie to call her "Solstice". Together, the two heroines fight off Zand's army of rock creatures, but Zand flees before they can capture her. After Zand's escape, Kiran departs from the museum with her parents, who are obviously aware that their daughter possesses superhuman abilities.

Kiran later appears at an archaeological dig in Mohenjo-daro, where her parents are working alongside Helena Sandsmark, Cassie's mother. After nightfall, Vijay and Rani go out for a walk, but mysteriously disappear without telling anyone. After an adventure with the Teen Titans, Kiran rescues her family and is invited to join the team. She remains with the team for their final adventure, where they face the Legion of Doom. She and Miss Martian work together to defeat Sun Girl.

In The New 52 continuity reboot, the members of N.O.W.H.E.R.E. kidnap Solstice and alter her powers, giving her a black, smoky appearance. In Doomsday Clock, Solstice joins India's sanctioned superhero team, the Doomed.

== Powers and abilities ==
Solstice is a metahuman with the ability to conjure concussive blasts of light energy. Her costume appears to be made of solid light, and she is able to generate and dissipate it at will. During the battle with Lady Zand, she also displays the power of flight.
