= Kenneth Rocafort =

Puerto Rican comic book artist

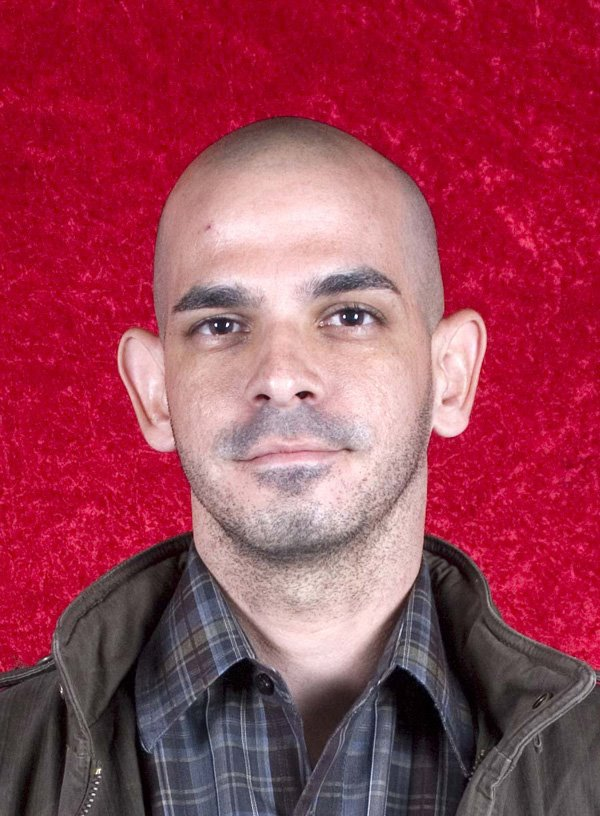
- Born: 1977 (age 48–49) Mayagüez, Puerto Rico
- Areas: Writer, Penciller, Inker, Letterer, Colourist
- Notable works: Madame Mirage; Superman; Astonishing Tales: Wolverine/Punisher; Red Hood and the Outlaws; Teen Titans; The Ultimates; GROKEN

Kenneth Rocafort (born 1977) is a Puerto Rican illustrator of comic books, known for his work on titles including Superman, Red Hood and the Outlaws, Astonishing Tales: Wolverine/Punisher, Teen Titans, The Ultimates, and his most recent graphic novel GROKEN.

== Career ==
Kenneth Rocafort has worked in various fields of the entertainment industry such as theatre, video game box art, storyboard for advertisement, comics, magazine, card game and toy box art. He was in charge of set design and preparation of the stage for diverse theatrical works inside and outside the University of Puerto Rico and he sometimes also designed the wardrobe. In animation field, he has worked in the area of storyboard and character design. He illustrated the toy boxes for G.I. Joe vehicles (R.O.C.C. and R.H.I.N.O.) for Hasbro and he also drew the box-cover for the PS2 video game Samurai Western.

He first started in comics in 2006, with Top Cow, doing a fill-in issue of the Marc Silvestri-illustrated Hunter-Killer series, before moving on to Paul Dini's Madame Mirage series.

In 2011, Rocafort began work with DC comics. From 2011 to 2012, he was the artist on DC's new Red Hood and the Outlaws. The series was generally received mixed reviews, drawing particular ire for its confused continuity and accusations that its depiction of Starfire was sexist.

In 2012, he worked on Superman (post New 52) with writing by Scott Lobdell.

From 2014 to 2015, he worked on the new Teen Titans series (being relaunched with a new issue 1), written by Will Pfeifer. Some promotional art for the series produced some debate over sexism in comics.

In 2015, he began work on the All-New All-Different Marvel series, Ultimates, with writer Al Ewing.

His father and older brother both work as graphic designers.

Rocafort, Justin Jordan, and Dan DiDio launched the Sideways series in 2018 as part of DC's "Dark Matter" line.

In January 2021 he launched a crowdfunding campaign for his own graphic novel, GROKEN, the first publication from his independent label Mitografia.

== Bibliography ==
=== DC ===
- Superman #709 (May 2011) (cover only)
- Action Comics #901–904 (2011) Collected as a trade paperback, ISBN 978-1781160336
- T.H.U.N.D.E.R. Agents #5 (May 2012) (cover only)
- The New 52 FCBD Special Edition #1 (June 2012)
- Red Hood and the Outlaws #1–14, 0 (2011–2013) Also collected as 2 trade paperbacks, Vol. 1: Redemption (ISBN 978-1401237127) and Vol. 2: The Starfire (ISBN 978-1401240905)
- Red Hood and the Outlaws vol. 2 #8, 11 (2017)
- Superman Annual #1 (October 2012)
- Superman vol. 2 #0, 13–19, 22–23, 25–27 (2012–2014)
- Superman vol. 3 #1–11 variant covers (2016)
- Threshold #1 (variant cover) (March 2013)
- Batman #9 vol. 2 (January 2013)
- Young Romance: The New 52 Valentine's Day Special #1 (April 2013)
- Justice League #18 (variant cover) (May 2013)
- Superboy vol. 5 #20, 25 (2013–2014)
- Batman/Superman #1 (variant covers) (August 2013)
- Action Comics Annual #2 (December 2013)
- Supergirl #25, 30 (2014)
- Batman Black and White #4 (February 2014)
- Superman: Lois Lane #1 (April 2014)
- Batman/Superman Annual #1 (May 2014)
- Teen Titans vol. 4 #30 (June 2014)
- Teen Titans vol. 5 #1–9 (2014–2015) Also collected as 2 trade paperbacks, Vol. 1: Blinded by the Light (ISBN 978-1401252373) and Vol. 2: Rogue Targets (ISBN 978-1401261627)
- Titans vol. 3 #12 (2017)
- Sideways #1–13 (2018–2019)
- Red Hood: Outlaw #37–39 (2019)
- From Beyond the Unknown Giant #1 (February 2020)
- Detective Comics vol. 1 #1025–1026, 1029 (with Peter J. Tomasi, DC Comics, August–October 2020)

=== Marvel ===
- Astonishing Tales: Wolverine/Punisher (2008) #1–6 (2008–2009)
- Astonishing Tales vol. 2 #1–6 (2009)
- Avengers #0 (October 2015) (cover only)
- The Ultimates vol. 4 #1–5, 7–11 (2015–2016)
- Inhumans vs. X-Men #0 (November 2016)

=== Top Cow ===
- Hunter-Killer #9–12 (2006–2007)
- Madame Mirage (May 2007) First Look - 'Who is Madame Mirage'
- Madame Mirage #1–6 (2007) Collected into a trade paperback in July 2008 (ISBN 978-1582409597)
- Broken Trinity Prelude (May 2008) July 2008
- Pilot Season: The Core #1 (September 2008) Collected in Pilot Season 2008 in 2009 (ISBN 1-60706-043-4)
- Cyblade #1 'Waking Life' (October 2008) (cover only)
- CyberForce / Hunter-Killer First Look (May 2009)
- CyberForce / Hunter-Killer #1–5 (2009–2010) Collected as a trade paperback (160 pages, 2010, ISBN 1-60706-104-X)
- Velocity #1–3 (2010) Collected into a trade paperback in August 2010 (ISBN 978-8467908961)
- Artifacts #1 (July 2010)

=== Wi~Fi Digital Press ===
- Darion #1 #2 (2005–2008) Republished in 2010 by Javier Sama

== Other work ==
- Victory #2 (September 2004 for Image Comics) (cover art)
- The Cadre #1 - 'When Dreams Are Born' (Jun 2005 for Nifty Comics)
- Grimm Fairy Tales (2005) #23 (Feb 2008 for Zenescope Entertainment)
- Forty-Five (December 2009 for Com.x with various other artists)
- Blood & Stone (October 11th, 2019 for Mitografia) Written by Luke Stokes
- GROKEN (January 2021 for Mitografia)

== See also ==
- List of Puerto Rican writers
- List of Puerto Ricans
- Puerto Rican literature
- Puerto Rican comic books
- American comic books
