= List of Secret Society of Super Villains members =

The Secret Society of Super Villains is a team of supervillains appearing in American comic books published by DC Comics. Over the years, they have featured a large number of ne'er-do-wells as they attempt to subvert the superheroic population of the world for a variety of schemes.

This page lists the known members of the Secret Society of Super Villains:

== Darkseid's Society ==
These members of the Secret Society of Super Villains were secretly gathered by Darkseid when the group was first founded in 1976 through their splintering after the discovery of their benefactor's true identity. Since then, various leaders like Lex Luthor, Wizard, and Silver Ghost have taken over or re-formed the Society, including old and new members in the roster.

- Darkseid
- Captain Boomerang (Digger Harkness)
- Captain Cold
- Captain Comet
- Copperhead
- Gorilla Grodd
- Manhunter (Paul Kirk clone)
- Mirror Master (Sam Scudder)
- Shadow Thief
- Sinestro
- Star Sapphire (Deborah Camille "Debbie" Darnell)
- Wizard
- Hi-Jack
- Lex Luthor
- Captain Stingaree
- Funky Flashman
- Matter Master
- Felix Faust
- Trickster (James Jesse)
- Bizarro (Pre-Crisis only)
- Poison Ivy
- Angle Man (Pre-Crisis only)
- Floronic Man
- Blockbuster (Mark Desmond)
- Professor Zoom / Reverse-Flash
- Silver Ghost
- Killer Moth
- Quakemaster
- Sizematic Twins
- Cavalier
- Chronos (David Clinton)

In JLA #119 (late Nov. 2005), it was revealed that Catwoman was an early member of the SSoSV briefly as well (Catwoman was mentioned in the text of Secret Society of Super Villains #1 as being a member, though the penciller omitted her from the issue; this brief mention is the only known connection of Catwoman to the SSoSV prior to the present). Also, Despero brought the memories of the members back, and was responsible of the subsequent attack of the Society.

== The Ultra-Humanite's Society ==
The next incarnation of the Secret Society was organized by the Ultra-Humanite, who organized foes of both the Justice League of America and the Justice Society of America.

- Ultra-Humanite
- Brain Wave
- Monocle
- Psycho-Pirate (Roger Hayden)
- Rag Doll (Peter Merkel)
- Cheetah (Deborah Domaine)
- Floronic Man
- Killer Frost (Crystal Frost)
- Mist
- Signalman

== Underground ==
When the JLA resurfaced with the Big Seven members, Brain Wave started to gather a new Secret Society to take down the newly formed Justice League (JLA 80-Page Giant #1), but Brain Wave was actually the Martian Manhunter in disguise—the formation of this Society was a trap made by the League to defeat more supervillains in the same time (as the tale was told by Rainbow Raider to Sonar, it is uncertain whether this tale actually happened; at the very least, there may have been some embellishment).

Members gathered by "Brain Wave" were:

- Amos Fortune
- Black Hand
- Blockbuster (Roland Desmond)
- Bolt
- Captain Boomerang (Digger Harkness)
- Cheetah (Barbara Ann Minerva)
- Cheshire
- Crazy Quilt
- Deadshot
- Doctor Alchemy
- Doctor Phosphorus
- Doctor Sivana
- Fiddler
- Floronic Man
- Gorilla Grodd
- Heat Wave
- Hector Hammond
- Killer Frost (Louise Lincoln)
- Major Disaster
- Monocle
- Penguin
- Per Degaton
- Poison Ivy
- Prankster
- Psycho-Pirate (Roger Hayden)
- Riddler
- Royal Flush Gang
  - Ace of Spades
  - Jack of Spades
  - Queen of Spades
  - Ten of Clubs
- Scarecrow
- Signalman
- Solomon Grundy
- Star Sapphire (Carol Ferris)
- Wizard

Several members appear via TV screens and are alleged to lead the other chapters of the Secret Society of Super Villains:

- Captain Cold
- Felix Faust
- Goldface
- Kobra
- Metallo
- Mister Mind
- Ra's al Ghul
- Two-Face
- Vandal Savage

== Alexander Luthor Jr.'s Society ==
Organized by Alexander Luthor Jr. in the guise of Lex Luthor, the Society formed over rumors of the JLA mindwiping Dr. Light. With a ruling council of six members overseeing a structured roster of 200 strong (Villains United #1), the Society is a grave threat to the superheroes of the world. Joker is notably absent from this roster, because he is the only villain the other villains all feared — and rightly so, as the Joker murdered several of the Society's roster in revenge for being left out.

=== The Society's council ===
- Lex Luthor (Alexander Luthor Jr. in disguise, leader)
- Black Adam (betrayed by the Society)
- Talia al Ghul
- Doctor Psycho
- Calculator
- Deathstroke

=== Members of the Society ===
- Abra Kadabra (Infinite Crisis #2)
- Amazo (Villains United #5)
- Amos Fortune (Villains United #5)
- Amygdala (Villains United: Infinite Crisis Special)
- Angle Man (Angelo Bend, Catwoman #46)
- Atomic Skull (Joseph Martin, Villains United #5)
- Axis America
  - Sea Wolf (Aquaman #37)
  - Übermensch (Shepherd, Villains United #5)
- Bane (Villains United: Infinite Crisis Special)
- Baron Blitzkrieg (JSA #81)
- Bizarro (Superman #221)
- Black Manta (Villains United #1)
- Black Mask (Roman Sionis, Batman #646)
- Blackrock (Lucia, Superman #223)
- Black Spider (Derrick Coe, Villains United #2)
- Body Doubles (Villains United #1)
- Bolt (Villains United #5)
- Brotherhood of Evil
  - Brain (Infinite Crisis #4)
  - Gemini (Infinite Crisis #4)
  - Houngan (Infinite Crisis #4)
  - Monsieur Mallah (Villains United #5)
  - Phobia (Villains United #1)
  - Plasmus (Villains United #1)
  - Warp (Infinite Crisis #4)
- Brutale (Villains United #2)
- Bug and Byte (Infinite Crisis #2)
- Captain Boomerang (Owen Mercer, The Flash (vol. 2) #225)
- Captain Cold (The Flash (vol. 2) #225)
- Captain Nazi (Villains United #2)
- Chain Lightning (Infinite Crisis #2)
- Cheetah (Barbara Ann Minerva, Villains United #1)
- Chemo (Infinite Crisis #4)
- Chronos (Infinite Crisis #7)
- Cicada (Villains United #1)
- Clayface (Basil Karlo, Superman/Batman #19)
- Clayface (Cassius Payne, Infinite Crisis #7)
- Colonel Computron (Basil Nurblin, Infinite Crisis #2)
- Count Vertigo (Villains United #2)
- Crazy Quilt (Villains United #2)
- Crime Doctor (Bradford Thorne, Villains United #2)
- Cyborgirl (Infinite Crisis #7)
- Dark Nemesis
  - Blizard (Infinite Crisis #7)
  - Vault (Outsiders #33)
- Demons Three (Day of Vengeance: Infinite Crisis Special)
- Deep Six (Aquaman #37)
  - Gole
  - Jaffar
  - Kurin
  - Shaligo
  - Slig
  - Trok
- Doctor Light (Arthur Light, Countdown to Infinite Crisis)
- Doctor Moon (Manhunter #17)
- Doctor Polaris (Neal Emerson, Villains United #2)
- Doctor Sivana (Infinite Crisis #2)
- Double Dare (Villains United #5)
- Eel (Aquaman #37)
- Effigy (Superman #225)
- Electrocutioner (Lester Buchinsky, Infinite Crisis #7)
- Fadeaway Man (Villains United #1)
- Fastball of the Cadre (Infinite Crisis #7)
- Fatality (Villains United #1)
- Felix Faust (Villains United #1)
- Fearsome Five (Villains United #5)
  - Psimon
  - Jinx
  - Mammoth
  - Shimmer
- Firefly (Villains United #3)
- Fisherman (Infinite Crisis #1)
- Folded Man (Infinite Crisis #7)
- Gamesman (Aquaman #37)
- Gearhead (Infinite Crisis #2)
- General (Infinite Crisis #3)
- Giganta (Villains United #5)
- Girder (The Flash (vol. 2) #225)
- Gorilla Grodd (Villains United #1)
- Goth (Infinite Crisis #2)
- H.I.V.E. (Villains United #4)
  - Queen Bee (Zazzala, Villains United #4)
- Hagen (Aquaman #37)
- Hammer and Sickle (Catwoman #46)
- Harley Quinn (Superman/Batman #19)
- Heat Wave (Superman #225)
- Hector Hammond (Villains United: Infinite Crisis Special)
- Hellhound (Jack Chifford, Villains United #2)
- Humpty Dumpty (Villains United #5)
- Hugo Strange (Catwoman #46)
- Both Hyenas (Summer Day and Jivan Shi, Villains United #2 and Batman #647)
- Ibac (Villains United #5)
- Injustice Society
  - Wizard (Villains United #2)
  - Gentleman Ghost (Villains United #1)
  - Rag Doll (Peter Merkel, Villains United #5)
  - Thinker (Clifford DeVoe Infinite Crisis #2)
  - Solomon Grundy (Villains United #5)
- Invisible Destroyer (Infinite Crisis #7)
- Iron Cross of the Aryan Brigade (Infinite Crisis #7)
- Killer Croc (Villains United: Infinite Crisis Special)
- Killer Frost (Louise Lincoln, Villains United #2)
- King Shark (Villains United #5)
- Knockout (Villains United #1, revealed as a mole for the Secret Six in Villains United #6)
- The Kobra Cult (Breach #3)
- Lady Vic (Villains United: Infinite Crisis Special)
- League of Assassins (Villains United: Infinite Crisis Special)
  - Lady Shiva (Secret Six #1)
  - Nyssa Raatko (JSA: Classified #6)
  - Shrike (Villains United: Infinite Crisis Special)
- Lock-Up (Villains United: Infinite Crisis Special)
- Mad Hatter (Infinite Crisis #7)
- Madmen (Countdown to Infinite Crisis)
- Marauder (Aquaman #37)
- Merlyn (Green Arrow #57)
- Metallo (Manhunter #10)
- Mirror Master (Evan McCulloch, The Flash (vol. 2) #225)
- Mister 104 (Countdown to Infinite Crisis)
- Mister Atom (Infinite Crisis #2)
- Mister Freeze (Villains United #1)
- Mister Poseidon (Infinite Crisis #2)
- Mister Terrible (Villains United #5)
- Mister Who (Infinite Crisis #7)
- Mister Zsasz (Villains United #5)
- Monocle (Manhunter #8)
- Multiplex (Villains United #1)
- Murmur (Infinite Crisis #1)
- New Wave (Infinite Crisis #3)
- Nuclear Family (Crisis Aftermath: The Battle for Blüdhaven #4)
- Nuclear Legion (Crisis Aftermath: The Battle for Blüdhaven #1)
  - Geiger
  - Mister Nitro
  - Neutron (Infinite Crisis #7)
  - Nuclear
  - Professor Radium
  - Reactron
- Ocean Master (Aquaman #37)
- Onomatopoeia (Infinite Crisis #7)
- Parasite (Alexandra Allston, Villains United #4)
- Penguin (Robin #135)
- Piscator (Infinite Crisis #3)
- Piranha Man (Charybdis, Infinite Crisis #3)
- Pistolera (Secret Six #1)
- Poison Ivy (Superman/Batman #19)
- Professor Ivo (Infinite Crisis #7)
- Prometheus (Chad Graham, Villains United #1)
- Psycho-Pirate (Roger Hayden, Infinite Crisis #1)
- Quakemaster (Infinite Crisis #3)
- Ravager (Teen Titans #22)
- Red Panzer (Justin, Infinite Crisis #1)
- Riddler (Green Arrow #50)
- Royal Flush Gang (Villains United #4)
  - Ace of Spades
  - Jack of Spades
  - King of Spades
  - Queen of Spades
  - Ten of Spades
- Ruin (Adventures of Superman Vol 1 #636)
- Sabbac (Ishamel Gregor, Villains United #1)
- Scarecrow (Villains United #5)
- Scavenger (Aquaman #37)
- Scorch (Superman #225)
- Shadow Thief (Villains United #1)
- Shark (Infinite Crisis #3)
- Shellshock (Ruth Spencer, Infinite Crisis #3)
- Shock Trauma of the Hangmen (Infinite Crisis #7)
- Shrapnel (Villains United #1)
- Silver Banshee (Infinite Crisis #3)
- Sinestro (Villains United #5)
- Siren (La Sirène la Bailene, Infinite Crisis #3)
- Skorpio (Villains United #1)
- Sledge (Villains United #3)
- Smart Bomb (Bradley, Catwoman #47)
- Starro (Infinite Crisis #7)
- Sting (Villains United #5)
- Strike Force Kobra
  - Planet Master (Kobra version, Infinite Crisis #7)
  - Spectrumonster (Infinite Crisis #7)
  - Zebra-Man (Kobra version, Infinite Crisis #7)
- Superior Five (Villains United #4)
  - Tremor
  - Hindenburg
  - Splitshot
  - Lagomorph
  - Jongleur
- Syonide (Firestorm #17)
- Tattooed Man (Abel Tarrent, Villains United: Infinite Crisis Special)
- Terra-Man (52 #3)
- Thinker (Infinite Crisis #2)
- Torpedo Man (Villains United #5)
- Toyman (Winslow Schott, Villains United #5)
- Trickster (James Jesse, The Flash (vol .2) #225)
- Turtle (The Flash (vol. 2) #219)
- Tweedledee and Tweedledum (Villains United #5)
- Typhoon (Infinite Crisis #3)
- Ultivac (Infinite Crisis #2)
- Vandal Savage (Villains United #5)
- Ventriloquist and Scarface (Infinite Crisis #1)
- Vicious (Secret Six #1)
- Virtuoso (Villains United #5)
- Weather Wizard (Villains United #2)
- Zookeeper (Villains United: Infinite Crisis Special)
- Zoom (Infinite Crisis #1)

=== Possible members ===
The following had declined to join the Society:

- Catman (became a member of the Secret Six)
- Creeper
- Kite Man
- A Manhunter (either Mark Shaw or Kate Spencer)

=== Deceased members ===
- An unidentified Hyena was executed as an example in Villains United #3.
- Doctor Polaris exploded after being subject to the exposed form of an irate Human Bomb toward the beginning of Infinite Crisis #1.
- Fisherman was gunned down by detectives Marcus Driver and Josie Mac in Gotham Central #37.
- High-ranking members of the Gotham branch of the Royal Flush Gang were seemingly taken out by the Joker in Infinite Crisis #2.
- Rag Doll (Peter Merkel Jr.) was killed by Johnny Sorrow in JSA Classified #7.
- Black Mask was shot by Catwoman in Catwoman #52.
- Crispus Allen (as the Spectre) struck down Star Sapphire (Deborah Camille "Debbie" Darnell) in the first half of Infinite Crisis #6.
- Psycho-Pirate had his Medusa Mask forcibly pushed through his skull by Black Adam during the finale of Infinite Crisis #6.
- Amos Fortune had half of his face blown off in Villains United #6, surviving only to be thrown from a moving helicopter in Villains United: Infinite Crisis Special before absorbing energy and exploding in JSA Classified #16.
- Deuce Canyard (an aspiring "Jack" of the Royal Flush Gang) was sniped by the warden of Enclave M in Villains United: Infinite Crisis Special.
- Baron Blitzkrieg was incinerated by Superboy-Prime's heat vision during the Battle of Metropolis.
- Alexander Luthor Jr. was killed by Joker in the final pages of Infinite Crisis #7.
- In the novelization, Doctor Spectro is a member as well of the Society and dies in the same explosion that killed Solomon Grundy and the Bloodlines heroes.
- In an interview with DC editor-in-chief Dan DiDio, he confirms that Boss Moxie did indeed die in Infinite Crisis #7 by stating that Superboy-Prime snapped his neck.

== The Wizard's Society ==
Some former members of the Wizard's Secret Society, also victims of the JLA's mindwiping in the past, had their memories unlocked by Despero and then were summoned back together for revenge by the Wizard. Zatanna reluctantly re-erased their memories of the JLA's identities. Whether they were members of Alexander Luthor Jr.'s Society as well is unknown.

In addition to the Wizard, Felix Faust and Chronos, the membership included:

- Floronic Man
- Star Sapphire (Deborah Camille "Debbie" Darnell)
- Matter Master

== One Year Later ==
One year after the events of Infinite Crisis, the Calculator has taken control of the Society, with Talia al Ghul as the only other original leader left. Felix Faust and the Cheetah (Barbara Ann Minerva), however, have also been linked to this group.

== Libra's Society ==
In the lead-up to Final Crisis, the returned supervillain Libra (who happens to be the prophet of Darkseid) takes the scattered remnants of Luthor's Secret Society and uses it to create his own Secret Society of Super Villains to serve Darkseid. The following are confirmed members so far.

=== Leader ===
- Libra

=== Inner Circle ===
- Doctor Sivana
- Gorilla Grodd
- Lex Luthor
- Ocean Master
- Talia al Ghul
- Vandal Savage

=== Membership ===
- Black Manta
- Chronos
- Clayface (Basil Karlo)
- Cyborgirl
- Deathstroke
- Doctor Polaris
- Giganta
- Human Flame
- Icicle (Cameron Mahkent)
- Key
- Killer Croc
- Killer Frost (Louise Lincoln)
- Metallo
- Parasite (Rudy Jones)
- Shadow Thief
- Shatterfist
- Shrike
- Zoom

=== Former membership ===
- Doctor Light (killed by the third Spectre)
- Effigy (melted by the third Spectre)
- Hangmen (all five killed by the third Spectre before they can swear allegiance to Libra)
  - Breathtaker
  - Killshot
  - Provoke
  - Shock Trauma
  - Stranglehold
- Rogues (all five withdrew from the Society)
  - Abra Kadabra
  - Captain Cold
  - Heat Wave
  - Mirror Master
  - Weather Wizard
- New Rogues (all five killed by the Rogues)
  - Burn
  - Chill
  - Mirror Man
  - Mister Magic
  - Weather Witch

=== Members turned into Justifiers ===
- Gorilla Grodd
- Human Flame
- Killer Croc
- Man-Bat
- Silver Swan (Vanessa Kapatelis)
- Typhoon

== The Cheetah's Society ==
Following the Final Crisis, the Cheetah has assembled another Secret Society of Super Villains. Among its members are:

- Crime Doctor (Anica Balcescu)
- Doctor Poison (Marina Maru)
- Felix Faust
- Firefly
- Genocide
- Mammoth
- Phobia
- Professor Ivo
- Red Volcano
- Shrapnel
- T. O. Morrow

== The New 52's Society ==
In The New 52, the Secret Society of Super Villains is reintroduced in issues of Justice League of America when "the Outsider" is seen assembling them to deal with the growing superhero community as well as to have members he can offer to the Crime Syndicate of America to assist them once they arrive.

First appearance and any additional info listed in parentheses.

- Amazo (Forever Evil #1)
- Angle Man (Forever Evil #1)
- Bane (Talon #11)
- Black Adam (Forever Evil #1, left in Justice League #24)
- Black Bison (Forever Evil #1)
- Black Manta (Forever Evil #1, left in Aquaman #23.1)
- Black Mask (Forever Evil #1)
- Blockbuster (Mark Desmond, Justice League of America #3)
- Captain Boomerang (Forever Evil #1)
- Cheetah (Justice League #14)
- Crime Syndicate of America
  - Atomica (as the Atom, the mole in both the Justice League and the Justice League of America, in Justice League #18; as Atomica of Earth-3 in Justice League #23)
  - Deathstorm (Justice League #23)
  - Grid (Justice League #23)
  - Johnny Quick (Justice League #23, killed by Alexander Luthor of Earth-3 in Forever Evil #6)
  - "Outsider" / Alfred Pennyworth (unnamed in Justice League #6; as "the Outsider" in Justice League #22; identified as the Alfred Pennyworth of Earth-3 in Justice League #23, killed by Black Manta in Forever Evil #6)
  - Owlman (Justice League #23)
  - Power Ring (Justice League #23, killed by Sinestro in Forever Evil #5)
  - Superwoman (Justice League #23)
  - Ultraman (Justice League #23)
- Cluemaster (Forever Evil #1)
- Copperhead (Justice League of America #4, killed by Deathstroke in Forever Evil #5)
- Deadshot (Forever Evil #1)
- Deathstroke (Forever Evil #1, quits in Forever Evil #5)
- Despero (Forever Evil #1)
- Doctor Destiny (Forever Evil #1)
- Doctor Phosphorus (Forever Evil #1)
- Doctor Psycho (Justice League Dark #22)
- Dollmaker (Forever Evil #1)
- Emperor Penguin (Forever Evil #1)
- Enchantress (Forever Evil #1)
- Fearsome Five
  - Gizmo (Forever Evil #1)
  - Jinx (Forever Evil #1)
  - Mammoth (Forever Evil #1)
  - Psimon (Forever Evil #1)
  - Shimmer (Forever Evil #1)
- Felix Faust (Justice League of America #6)
- Firefly (Forever Evil #1)
- Flamingo (Forever Evil #1)
- Gentleman Ghost (Forever Evil #1)
- Giganta (Trinity of Sin: Pandora #2)
- Gorilla Grodd (Forever Evil #1)
- Harley Quinn (Forever Evil #1)
- Hector Hammond (Forever Evil #1)
- Hugo Strange (Forever Evil #1)
- Hyena (Summer Day, Justice League of America #6)
- Joker's Daughter (Forever Evil #1)
- Key (Forever Evil #1)
- Killer Croc (Forever Evil #1)
- Killer Frost (Justice League of America #6, quits in Forever Evil: A.R.G.U.S #3)
- King Shark (Forever Evil #1)
- Lion-Mane (Forever Evil #1)
- Livewire (Justice League #30)
- Mad Hatter (Justice League of America #6)
- Man-Bat (Forever Evil #1)
- Merlyn (Forever Evil #1)
- Metallo (Forever Evil #1, killed by Ultraman in Forever Evil #4)
- Mister Freeze (Forever Evil #1)
- Mister Zsasz (Forever Evil #1)
- Monocle (Forever Evil #1, killed by Ultraman in Forever Evil #1)
- Multiplex (Justice League #13)
- Neutron (Forever Evil #1)
- Nocturna (Forever Evil #1)
- Parasite (Forever Evil #1)
- Penguin (Forever Evil #1)
- Plastique (Justice League #22)
- Poison Ivy (Forever Evil #1)
- Prankster (Forever Evil #1)
- Professor Ivo (unnamed in Justice League #6, revealed in Justice League of America #1)
- Professor Pyg (Forever Evil #1)
- Riddler (Forever Evil #1)
- Rogues
  - Captain Cold (Forever Evil #1, quits in Forever Evil #2)
  - Golden Glider (Forever Evil #1, quits in Forever Evil #2)
  - Heat Wave (Forever Evil #1, quits in Forever Evil #2)
  - Mirror Master (Forever Evil #1, quits in Forever Evil #2)
  - Trickster (Forever Evil #1, quits in Forever Evil #2)
  - Weather Wizard (Forever Evil #1, quits in Forever Evil #2)
- Royal Flush Gang (Forever Evil #1)
  - Ace of Diamonds (Forever Evil: Rogues Rebellion #4)
  - Ace of Hearts (Forever Evil: Rogues Rebellion #4)
  - Ace of Spades (Forever Evil #1)
  - Eight of Hearts (Forever Evil: Rogues Rebellion #5)
  - Jack of Clubs (Forever Evil #1)
  - Jack of Diamonds (Forever Evil: Rogues Rebellion #4)
  - Jack of Hearts (Forever Evil: Rogues Rebellion #4)
  - King of Spades (Forever Evil #1)
  - Queen of Clubs (Forever Evil #1)
  - Ten of Clubs (Forever Evil #1)
- Scarecrow (Justice League of America #2)
- Scavenger (Justice League of America #6)
- Shadow Thief (Forever Evil #1)
- Shaggy Man (Professor Ivo's version, Justice League of America #4)
- Signalman (Justice League of America #3)
- Slipknot (Forever Evil #1)
- Starro (Forever Evil #1)
- Tweedledum and Tweedledee (Forever Evil #1)
- Two-Face (Forever Evil #1, quit in Batman and Robin #23.1)
- Typhoon (Forever Evil #1)
- Vandal Savage (Trinity of Sin: Pandora #2)
- Warp (Wonder Woman #23.1)
- White Rabbit (Forever Evil #1)

== DC Rebirth's Society ==
The DC Rebirth reboot featured the Secret Society of Super Villains, where they place Deathstroke the Terminator on trial to see if he is still evil or not.

The lineup consists of:

Chairpersons

- Vandal Savage (leader)
- Lex Luthor (former member)
- Ultra-Humanite
- Hector Hammond
- Professor Zoom / Reverse-Flash
- Killer Frost
- Black Manta
- Deadline
- Raptor
- Riddler

== Infinite Frontier’s Society ==
This was the line-up seen in Infinite Frontier and Dark Crisis:

- Deathstroke (leader)
- Amazo
- Angle Man (Angelo Bend)
- Black Spider (Eric Needham)
- Body Doubles
- Bug-Eyed Bandit
- Calculator (former member)
- Count Vertigo
- Copperhead
- Crazy Quilt (Paul Dekker)
- Crime Doctor (Bradford Thorne)
- Cluemaster
- Deadline (former member)
- Doctor Destiny
- Doctor Moon (former member)
- Doctor Phosphorus
- Dollmaker (Barton Mathis)
- Felix Faust
- Flamingo
- Firefly
- Gentleman Ghost
- Giganta (former member)
- Girder
- Gizmo
- Goldface
- Gunsmith
- Hellhound
- Hyena (Summer Day)
- Kanjar Ro
- Key
- Lion-Mane
- Mad Dog (Rex)
- Mammoth
- Merlyn
- Monocle (former member)
- Multiplex
- Neutron
- Nocturna
- Phobia
- Prankster
- Prometheus
- Psimon
- Raptor
- Scavenger (Peter Mortimer)
- Scream Queen
- Shadow Thief
- Shaggy Man (Professor Ivo's version)
- Shrapnel
- Silver Banshee
- Skorpio
- Slipknot
- Tattooed Man
- Trident
- Typhoon
- Toyman
- Warp
