= List of Teen Titans enemies =

This is a list of fictional characters from DC Comics who are or have been enemies of the Teen Titans. In chronological order (with issue and date of first appearance).

Villain	First appearance in DC Comics	Description
Two-Face	Detective Comics #66 (August 1942)	A long-time enemy of Batman, Two-Face appears in a two-issue story arc involving the Joker's Daughter (Duela Dent) seeking membership in the Teen Titans.
Puppeteer	Green Lantern #1 (July–August 1960)	A Green Lantern villain who was contracted by H.I.V.E. and would begin to face the Teen Titans.
Doctor Light	Justice League of America #12 (June 1962)	Originally an enemy of the Justice League of America, Light also became an enemy of the Teen Titans.
Brotherhood of Evil	Doom Patrol #86 (March 1964)	Led by the Brain, the Brotherhood of Evil has generally troubled the Doom Patrol until Titan Beast Boy rallied his teammates to save his former allies Robotman and Mento. Since then, the villainous group has challenged the Titans.
Mister Twister	Brave and the Bold #54 (June–July 1964)	Using a shaman's medicine staff, Bromwell Stikk could control the forces of nature taking to a life of crime as Mister Twister and coming into conflict with the Titans, becoming their first enemy. Stikk would be transformed later into the Gargoyle by Antithesis, becoming his agent.
Mento	Doom Patrol #91 (November 1964)	Formerly an associate of the Doom Patrol, Steve Dayton married team member Elasti-Girl and adopted the orphaned Beast Boy. His wife would die saving her teammates and when Dayton sought her killers, they captured and tortured him until his mind snapped. Dayton blamed Beast Boy for the loss of his wife and formed the group Hybrid to destroy the Titans. It would later appear he recovered only to discover he adopted the identity of the crime lord and employed nuclear bombs scattered across the United States.
Arsenal	Doom Patrol #100 (December 1965)	Designated the legal guardian of Beast Boy after the death of his parents, Nicholas Galtry donned a suit of armor as Arsenal trying to kill the hero to obtain his inheritance.
Ding Dong Daddy	Teen Titans #3 (May–June 1966)	Ding Dong Daddy Dowd operated a stolen car and motor bike ring employing high school dropouts until the Titans went undercover to reveal his operation.
Mister ESPer/Captain Calamity	Detective Comics #352 (June 1966)	Originally an enemy of Batman, Mr. ESPer tapped into Lilith Clay's powers to create a dual identity in Captain Calamity to appear on both coasts of the United States (leading to the creation of Titans West).
Fatal Five	Adventure Comics #352 (January 1967)	Primarily enemies of the Legion of Super-Heroes, the Fatal Five would face their foes and a time-displaced team of Titans prompting the Persuader to use his atomic axe to bring forth Fatal Fives of other dimensions, creating the Fatal 500.
Mad Mod	Teen Titans #7 (January–February 1967)	Neil Richards used his fashion design business as Mad Mod, a smuggler using his clothes for transportation.
André LeBlanc	Teen Titans #18 (November–December 1968)	An internationally renowned jewel thief who the Teen Titans were requested to help bring to justice.
Calculator	Detective Comics #463 (September 1976)	Noah Kuttler was originally a costumed criminal that challenged several members of the Justice League of America, but, learning of the computer hacker Oracle, was inspired to become an information broker for hire and agent for mercenaries. When his children Marvin and Wendy were respectively killed and paralyzed during their time in the Teen Titans, Calculator swore revenge on the heroes. Part of this plot was to reassemble the Fearsome Five and resulted in the deaths of Kid Devil and Kid Eternity.
Antithesis	Teen Titans #53 (February 1978)	An energy creature who feeds on negative emotion captured by the Justice League that escaped later to dominate their minds. The group's teen sidekicks were forced to battle their mentors, exile Antithesis to Limbo, and afterward officially formed the Teen Titans.
Dark Raven	DC Comics Presents #26 (October 1980)	The daughter of the powerful demon Trigon, Raven learned her father would soon come to enslave Earth. When she sought help from the Justice League, she was turned away when Zatanna sensed her parentage. Raven would reform the Titans in preparation for her father's invasion. However, she became Dark Raven after Trigon corrupted her.
H.I.V.E.	Action Comics #513 (November 1980)	An organization of scientists that sought to take over the Earth. Originally coming into conflict with Superman, the group would eventually hire the mercenary Deathstroke to eliminate the Titans, beginning an ongoing struggle between the three factions.
Deathstroke	New Teen Titans #2 (December 1980)	Slade Wilson is one of the premier mercenaries on Earth as Deathstroke the Terminator. When his son Grant adopted the identity of the Ravager and tried to surpass his father by killing the Titans, he would eventually die from the process he underwent from H.I.V.E. to gain his father's abilities. Slade would take on Grant's contract and has frequently battled the heroic group ever since (however, he has also, at times, been an ally).
Fearsome Five	New Teen Titans #3 (January 1981)	Organized by Doctor Light via an ad in the Underworld Star, he sought to defeat the Teen Titans. His group would be subverted, however, when Psimon took over under orders from his master Trigon.
Mammoth	New Teen Titans #3 (January 1981)	A founding member of the Fearsome Five and a metahuman who possesses immense strength and durability.
Gizmo	New Teen Titans #3 (January 1981)	A founding member of the Fearsome Five who is a skilled inventor, capable of converting almost any object into a weapon.
Shimmer	New Teen Titans #3 (January 1981)	A founding member of the Fearsome Five and the sister of Mammoth, Shimmer possesses the metahuman ability to transmute elements.
Trigon	New Teen Titans #5 (March 1981)	Raven's father, Trigon is the demonic lord of his native dimension. Seeking to conquer other worlds, Trigon gained worshippers on Earth in the Church of Blood and impregnated one of their number to conceive Raven, an anchor to the planet he sought. Raven would reform the Titans to battle Trigon and the demon has been a frequent opponent since.
Titans of Myth	New Teen Titans #11 (September 1981)	Hyperion is freed of his imprisonment by his fellow Titan Thia. Bewitching Donna Troy, Hyperion and the Amazon release the remaining Titans to make war with the gods of Olympus. Though the Titans would inevitably concede this battle, they would return numerous times, drawing the Teen Titans against them.
Plasmus	New Teen Titans #14 (December 1981)	Originally a miner in his native Germany, Otto von Furth was rescued from a cave-in of which he was the only survivor. Von Furth was later kidnapped by General Zahl, who transformed him into a being composed of corrosive protoplasm.
Disruptor	New Teen Titans #20 (June 1982)	Michael Beldon, son of the criminal "Brains" Beldon, wears a suit designed by his father that disrupts nature in an attempt to destroy the Teen Titans on behalf of H.I.V.E.
Brother Blood	New Teen Titans #21 (July 1982)	The highest position of power in the Church of Blood, there have been numerous individuals to maintain this rank. Founded in Zandia and worshiping the demon Trigon, the eighth Blood wanted to extend his cult's reach outside its native country and would inevitable run afoul of the Titans in America. There have been several Bloods since this initial encounter to battle the Titans.
Blackfire	New Teen Titans #22 (August 1982)	The sister of Starfire and Darkfire and ruler of Tamaran, Komand'r was born the day the Citadel invaded her homeworld. Though the invasion was repelled, the people always observed Komand'r with this day in mind. Combined with her inability to absorb ultraviolet light like the rest of her people, she was shunned and eventually, despite being the elder sibling, it was decided the younger Starfire would succeed the throne. Enraged, Blackfire betrayed her people to the Citadel and enslaved her sister, allowing her to be tortured and raped.
Terra	New Teen Titans #26 (December 1982)	Posing as a superhero to infiltrate the Titans, Tara Markov was a mercenary hired by Deathstroke in his plot to eliminate the team. She would die in a battle against the group when she buried herself in the ground in a fit of madness.
Cheshire	New Teen Titans Annual #2 (1983)	One of the Earth's authorities in toxins and a renowned assassin, Jade Nguyen would come into conflict with the Titans, but also had a brief romance with Roy Harper which produced a daughter, Lian.
Trident	New Teen Titans #33 (July 1983)	A trio of H.I.V.E. operatives who went independent as thieves. When they crossed the Titans, they manipulated the group with their similar costumes and builds, fooling them into believing there was only a single Trident.
Jericho	Tales of the Teen Titans #43 (June 1984)	Deathstroke's son teamed with the Titans to take down his father and joined the team, only to have his soul corrupted by the spirits of Azarath. Taking control of the Wildebeest Society, the Titans would learn of his betrayal and face him. In the ensuing battle, Deathstroke kills Jericho at his request. Jericho is later revealed to have survived by possessing Deathstroke's body. He is resurrected and returns to the Titans, but continues to struggle with his inner demons.
Jinx	Tales of the Teen Titans #56 (August 1985)	A leading member of the Fearsome Five, Jinx is an Indian sorceress who possesses a variety of magical abilities.
Superboy-Prime	DC Comics Presents #87 (November 1985)	The equivalent of Superman on Earth Prime, Superboy would be trapped in another dimension following the events of Crisis on Infinite Earths. Disappointed by the behavior of the heroes that emerged in the new Earth from Crisis and manipulated by Alexander Luthor Jr., Superboy broke free of his dimension and battled the Teen Titans in the Infinite Crisis storyline. He would return since to battle the Titans, forming a version of the Legion of Doom.
Hybrid	New Teen Titans #24 (October 1986)	A group of people mentally and physically manipulated by Mento into a force to battle the Titans, their superpowers derived from each being infused with Promethium. Hybrid members included Behemoth, Gorgon, Harpi, Prometheus, Pteradon, Scirocco, and Touch-N-Go.
Wildebeest Society	New Teen Titans #36 (October 1987)	A criminal organization employing exact replicas of the Wildebeest exo-suit that committed crimes one at a time to fool outsiders into believing there only existed a single villain. The group would eventually cross swords with the Titans and tried to eliminate the group of heroes. Jericho would eventually take over the Wildebeests and used them to attack the Titans. A second group of Wildebeests emerged under the villain Goth.
Children of the Sun	New Teen Titans #45 (July 1988)	A cult formed by Raymond Dark as part of his bid for planetary domination. Dark also dedicated his life to revenge against Silas Stone and, learning Cyborg was Silas' son, shifted his priorities against the Titans.
Deathwing	New Titans Annual #7 (1991)	Claimed as an alternate version of Dick Grayson from the Team Titans timeline, Deathwing is transformed into a psychotic killer corrupted by the influence of Raven.
Lord Chaos	New Titans Annual #7 (1991)	Robert Long, the son of Donna Troy and Terry Long, is born as a god, aging himself to adulthood, slays his parents, and conquers Earth in an alternate timeline. When the Team Titans go back in time to kill Donna before she gives birth to her son, Chaos follows to stop them. The Team Titans fail, and Donna gives birth, but the Titans of Myth strip the child of its power and take Lord Chaos along with them.
Holocaust	Blood Syndicate #1 (April 1993)	A founding member of the Blood Syndicate, Leonard Smalls would be released from the team for being too violent and go on to become a leading figure in the Dakota underworld as Holocaust. When Static returns to Dakota, he is captured by Holocaust to weaponize his abilities and the Teen Titans are drawn in to save the young hero.
H'San Natall	Teen Titans (vol. 2) #1 (October 1996)	An alien race that conquers intelligent worlds using bio-engineered soldiers. To this end, they kidnapped several women from Earth, impregnated them with metahuman children who were intended to act as sleeper agents for the species. Several of the teens - Isaiah Crockett, Toni Monetti, and Cody Driscoll - would go on to form a new Teen Titans. The aliens made attempts to reclaim the teens, but eventually abandoned their designs for Earth.
The Veil	Teen Titans (vol. 2) #3 (December 1996)	A group secretly founded by the H'San Natall dedicated to removing all extraterrestrial influence from Earth, which the aliens hoped to use to reclaim their hybrid metahumans on Earth. Led by N'Takki, who posed as a man named Pylon, most of the Veil was killed with poisonous gas when the organization outlived its usefulness.
Dark Nemesis	Teen Titans #7 (April 1997)	A group of superpowered mercenaries hired by the Veil to battle the Titans. They would return later to face the group on several occasions. Members include Axis, Blizzard, Carom, Scorcher, and Vault.
Haze	Teen Titans #12 (September 1997)	Jarrod Jupiter, the son of Loren Jupiter and brother of former Titan Lilith Clay, became the villain Haze when he learned his father began to fund the Teen Titans while being absent in his life and sought revenge. The Titans managed to best him. Haze would return years later again seeking revenge, but left in a catatonic state in its wake.
Goth	Titans #3 (May 1999)	A demon who seeks to subvert youth towards violence and anti-social behavior, at times aligning with Contessa Erica Alexandra del Portenza of the Agenda. He would die at the hands of Gog.
Tartarus	Secret Origins of Super-Villains 80-Page Giant #1 (December 1999)	A group organized by Vandal Savage with help from former Titan Omen to be an anti-Titans team as part of an operation he knew would bring him into conflict with the heroes. Its members included Gorilla Grodd, Siren, Red Panzer, Cheshire, and Lady Vic.
Hangmen	Titans: Secret Files & Origins #2 (October 2000)	A group of assassins hired by the nation of Qurac to kill Cheshire after she nearly destroyed the country. They would target Cheshire's daughter Lian and, also being the child of Roy Harper, would bring them against the Titans. Its members were Breathtaker, Killshot, Provoke, Shock Trauma, and Stranglehold.
Hallucinatra	Titans #42 (August 2002)	The ruler of the planet Chemical World that used drugs to enslave his people. One of the planet's residents escaped to Earth to recruit help to free the world's people and the Titans would follow.
Indigo	Titans/Young Justice: Graduation Day #1 (July 2003)	Brainiac 8 was sent back in time to kill Donna Troy because in the future she turns the tide in a war with Colu. Employing programming from her ancestor Brainiac, she accomplished her mission and yet was able to endear herself into the hero community as part of the Outsiders. She would later reveal the truth as part of the Insiders, but was believed to have been destroyed by her lover Shift until she reappeared in the Legion of Doom.
Zookeeper	Teen Titans #13 (September 2004)	Dr. Samuel Register worked with Beast Boy's parents and became afflicted with similar conditions as the hero, developing similar powers while sporting purple skin.
Titans of Tomorrow	Teen Titans/Legion Special #1 (November 2004)	A possible future where the Titans became some variation of the Justice League but by dealing out vicious justice. When the time-displaced Teen Titans arrived in this time period, their adult selves take several measures against the group to ensure their future. The main group is composed of Superman (Conner Kent), Batman (Tim Drake), Wonder Woman (Cassie Sandsmark), Flash (Bart Allen), Aquawoman (Lorena Marquez), Animal Man (Gar Logan), and Dark Raven.
Insiders	Teen Titans #24 (July 2005)	A group that nearly destroyed the Teen Titans and Outsiders from within when Lex Luthor activated a sleeper program in Superboy, making him subservient, and Brainiac switched off Indigo's program that made her an ally of her heroic group.
Titans East	Teen Titans #43 (March 2007)	Organized by Deathstroke, Titans East is a group of teenage combatants intended to eliminate the Titans. The group included Match, Batgirl, Inertia, Duela Dent, Bombshell, Enigma, Risk, Sun Girl, and Kid Crusader.
Terror Titans	Teen Titans #56 (April 2008)	Clock King organizes a group of teenage combatants to capture the Titans for the Dark Side Club. Its members were Dreadbolt, Copperhead, Persuader, and Disruptor.
Clock King	Teen Titans #57 (May 2008)	Temple Fugate is a relative unknown that was contracted by Boss Dark Side for the Dark Side Club before taking it over and forming a Martyr Militia out of young brainwashed metahumans. Sending his army to attack Los Angeles, he would be defeated by the Titans.
Sons of Trigon	Titans #1 (June 2008)	The children of Trigon based upon the seven deadly sins that were supposed to garner power for their father on Earth, but instead turned on him and robbed him of his own.
King Lycus	Teen Titans #62 (October 2008)	The son of Ares, Lycus sought to usurp Wonder Girl's role as Ares' champion by killing her. His hellhound would kill Marvin Kuttler and paralyze his sister Wendy.
Cinderblock	Titans #17 (November 2009)	A hulking creature of unknown origin that nearly defeated the Teen Titans before Beast Boy arrived to lead the youths to defeat it.
Headcase	Teen Titans #88 (December 2010)	Barney Venton was a social outcast experimented on by the unscrupulous Dr. Caligan, becoming psionic. Caligan tries to foster Venton's powers, bringing him into conflict with the Titans. Retreating to the high school Caligan used to experiment on teens, Headcase leads the battle against the teen heroes with fellow experiments Jock, Doll Face, and the Feral Boys. While defeated, he accidentally brings Superboy-Prime back to New Earth.
Legion of Doom	Teen Titans #98 (September 2011)	Angered over being taken off his Earth, Superboy-Prime forms a group of the Teen Titans' enemies to destroy the heroic team. His group includes Headcase, Brainiac 8, Persuader, Zookeeper, Sun Girl, Inertia, and three Superboy clones made from the genetic material of Match.
Harvest	Teen Titans vol. 4 #7 (May 2012)	The leader of N.O.W.H.E.R.E., Harvest is a cold, calculating and ruthless man out of time. His ultimate goal is humanitarian, at least in his own mind - to reshape the future through sheer force of will. He plans to control the next generation of metahumans, even if it means killing off the current one. His army is made up of past and present Ravagers, the winners of The Culling.

== See also ==
- List of Justice League enemies
- List of Batman family enemies
- List of Superman enemies
- List of Wonder Woman enemies
- List of Flash enemies
- List of Aquaman enemies
