= Gotham Underground =

US comic book series

- Cover art for the trade paperback of Gotham Underground. Art by Jim Califiore.

Publication information
- Publisher: DC Comics
- Schedule: Monthly
- Format: Limited series
- Genre: Superhero
- Publication date: December 2007 - August 2008
- No. of issues: 9
- Main characters: Batman; Penguin; Riddler; Tobias Whale; Intergang

Creative team
- Written by: Frank Tieri
- Penciller: Jim Califiore
- Inker: Jack Purcell
- Letterer: Steve Wands
- Colorist: Brian Reber
- Editor(s): Mike Marts; Jeanine Schaefer

Collected editions
- Gotham Underground: ISBN 1-4012-1928-4

Gotham Underground is a nine-issue limited series from the publishing company DC Comics, written by Frank Tieri, with art by Jim Califiore.

The series looked at the repercussions of Countdown to Final Crisis and focuses on the Batman Family banding together to prevent a gang war to find out who will occupy the territory that belonged to the recently deceased Black Mask.

== Publication history ==
The series ran from December 2007 to August 2008.

Some of the issues tie in with Salvation Run.

A trade paperback was released on November 19, 2008.

== Plot ==
A group of people hidden in the shadows attack and capture Man-Bat before discussing their next target. At Gotham City's police headquarters, Commissioner Gordon lights the Bat-Signal, but only Robin answers the call. Gordon tells him about the recent upsurge in gang-related violence. Dozens of would-be crime lords are trying to fill the vacancy created by the death of Black Mask. Meanwhile, Batman infiltrates the Iceberg Lounge in the guise of henchman Matches Malone. He wants to keep an eye on the Penguin's recent activities. He knows that the Penguin is projecting the image of a legitimate businessman, but suspects that Penguin may also be the ringleader behind an "underground railroad" for supervillains. As Penguin conducts his affairs, Two-Face enters the club and wants in on his underground railroad project. Penguin tells him to meet him later after hours. The Penguin holds a meeting with several of Gotham's most notorious villains, including Hugo Strange, Two-Face, Scarecrow, and Mad Hatter. Matches Malone spies on the meeting from behind a darkened alcove. Suddenly, the Suicide Squad bursts into the room and attacks the assemblage of villains. Bane knocks Malone out with a single punch.

It is revealed that Penguin is involved with the Suicide Squad and that he set up the other villains to gain the favor of the Squad. Scarecrow, who has recently reconsidered his decision to abandon his fear toxins, gasses Bronze Tiger and escapes to warn Ventriloquist. However, when the Ventriloquist and her gang accuse Scarecrow of being the Suicide Squad's snitch and then lead an assault on the Iceberg Lounge, Scarecrow leads them into a trap by Tobias Whale. Whale then betrays him, leaving him beaten and tied up, though alive (but barely), as a sign to all "masks" that they are not welcome in Whale's new vision of Gotham. Batman, as Matches Malone, is in Blackgate Penitentiary. Bane, aware that Malone is Batman, arranges for him to be constantly attacked by other inmates to wear him down. Meanwhile, the Riddler investigates Penguin's underground railroad.

Bruce/Matches learns how Great White Shark got from Arkham Asylum to Blackgate Penitentiary. Tobias Whale and Penguin are both assembling armies. Spoiler is seemingly working with the Penguin to take care of Johnny Denetto, a member of Intergang. As Bruce/Matches escapes Blackgate Penitentiary, Nightwing as "Freddie Dinardo" has a run-in with Vigilante.

Penguin's gangs and Tobias Whale's 100 are currently fighting each other as Robin, Huntress, Batgirl, and Wildcat get involved. When Riddler visits Penguin, he is thrown into a room with the Femme Fatales. Even though Penguin gets the upper hand, Whale reluctantly calls a truce with him to stop Johnny Denetto and Intergang. After Vigilante shows up and shoots two members of the Five Points Gang, Batman arrives to save Nightwing from Vigilante.

When Penguin and Riddler are talking in the Iceberg Lounge, members of Intergang attack. Things were not looking good for the Penguin until Batman arrives and comes to his rescue. However, Batman is not here just to save his life. He lets Penguin know that he owns him now and that he will report everything to Batman concerning Intergang and what is going on in Gotham, to which Penguin agrees.

== Cast of characters ==
- Batman
- Nightwing
- Robin
- Oracle
- Batgirl
- Spoiler
- Alfred Pennyworth
- Commissioner James Gordon
- Huntress
- Question
- Wildcat
- Penguin
- Riddler
- The Suicide Squad

=== Villains ===
- The 100
- Amygdala
- Firefly
- The Galantes
- Gotham Organized Crime
  - All-Americans
  - Irish Wound Ravens
  - Italian East-Siders
  - Jewish Sons of David
  - Free Men Gang
- Great White Shark
- Hugo Strange
- Intergang
  - Johnny Denetto
- Joker
- Killer Moth
- Lock-Up
- Mad Hatter
- Man-Bat
- Mr. Jessup
- The Odessas
- Ra's al Ghul
- Scarecrow
- Tobias Whale
- Two-Face
- Ventriloquist
- Victor Zsasz

==== Penguin's Army ====
All members of Penguin's army were provided with weapons based on those of established villains. They formed small groups inspired by the affiliations of the originals. Their individual codenames were not revealed except for a few of them, although the New Rogues' were given their codenames shortly before their deaths in Final Crisis: Rogues' Revenge #2.

- The Bat Killers - A gang that was first seen in Gotham Underground #6. They are based on enemies of Batman: Joker, Catman, Mr. Freeze, Mad Hatter, Clayface, and Bane.
- The Dead End Boys - A gang that was first seen in Gotham Underground #6. They are based on members of the Suicide Squad: Chemo, Deadshot, Bolt, Killer Frost, Jewelee, and Shrapnel.
- The Femme Fatales - A female gang that was first seen in Gotham Underground #6. The Femme Fatales are based on Catwoman, Hyena, Magenta, Silver Swan, and Prankster.
- The Five Points Gang - A gang that was first seen in Gotham Underground #6. They are based on members of the Fearsome Five: Doctor Light, Jinx, Mammoth, Neutron, and Psimon. The members based on Jinx and Psimon were killed by Vigilante.
- The L.O.D. - A gang that was first seen in Gotham Underground #6. They are based on members of the Legion of Doom: Lex Luthor, Cheetah, Gorilla Grodd, Metallo, Sonar, and Giganta.
- The New Rogues - A gang that was first seen in Gotham Underground #3. They are based on the Rogues.
  - Burn - Burn is based on Heat Wave and wields one of Heat Wave's flame guns. Burn is later revealed to be a disguised Nightwing. A second version of Burn was introduced in Gotham Underground #6.
  - Chill - Chill is based on Captain Cold and wields one of Captain Cold's freeze guns.
  - Mirror Man - Mirror Man is based on Mirror Master and wields one of Mirror Master's mirrors.
  - Mr. Magic - Mr. Magic is based on Abra Kadabra and wields one of Abra Kadabra's wands.
  - Weather Witch - Weather Witch is based on Weather Wizard and wields one of Weather Wizard's weather-controlling wands.

== Collected editions ==
The series has been collected into a trade paperback:

- Gotham Underground (224 pages, Titan Books, January 2009, ISBN 1-84576-965-1, DC Comics, November 2008, ISBN 1-4012-1928-4)
