= Trident (DC Comics) =

DC Comics supervillain

Publication information
- Publisher: DC Comics
- First appearance: The New Teen Titans #33 (July 1983)
- Created by: Marv Wolfman; George Pérez

In-story information
- Alter ego: Prof; Sammy Jaye; Val Armorr
- Team affiliations: H.I.V.E. Secret Society of Super Villains
- Abilities: Trident blasts; Hand-to-hand combat; Mechanical proficiency; Trident proficiency

Trident is the name of several supervillains appearing in American comic books published by DC Comics.

== Publication history ==
The Trident Trio first appeared in New Teen Titans #33 (July 1983), and were created by Marv Wolfman and George Pérez. Wolfman later acknowledged that he recycled the idea of different people posing as a single villain from the Brothers Grimm, a pair of Marvel Comics characters who he created in 1978.

== Fictional character biography ==
Trident is a collective identity shared by three rogue H.I.V.E. operatives: weapons designer "Prof", enforcer Sammy Jaye, and an unnamed black man who previously fought in the Golden Gloves. The there decide to team up and strike out on their own. Each adopts the costume and code-name of Trident, and each is armed with a powerful trident. The trident's right tine shoots fire, the left tine shoots ice, and the center tine releases a blast of devastating force. Trident operates in New York City, each criminal taking turns at committing robberies and leading the public to believe them to be a single person. Eventually, Jaye tries to cheat his two partners out of their share of loot. The other two kill Jaye, whose body is discovered by the Teen Titans and the police. Starfire figures out that there is more than one Trident, with the remaining two being tracked down and arrested.

Some time after the two surviving Tridents are imprisoned, Wildebeest springs the unnamed Trident, Gizmo, Puppeteer, and Disruptor from jail. These villains are eventually recaptured by the Teen Titans.

In Infinite Crisis, Trident joins Alexander Luthor Jr.'s Secret Society of Super Villains.

In Justice League, the name Trident is used by Karate Kid, who is possessed by Starro and claims to be a member of the Trident Guild.

== Powers and abilities ==
Trident carries a trident that has three tines: the right shoots fire, the left shoots ice, and the middle releases a blast of devastating force. He can project holograms which make him appear several feet away from where he is standing while concealing his true position.

== In other media ==
- Trident appears in Teen Titans, voiced by Clancy Brown. This version is an arrogant fish-man and a member of the Brotherhood of Evil.
- Trident appears in Teen Titans Go!.
- Trident appears as a character summon in Scribblenauts Unmasked: A DC Comics Adventure.
