= H.I.V.E. =

DC Comics supervillain organization

- H.I.V.E. symbol

Publication information
- Publisher: DC Comics
- First appearance: The New Teen Titans #2 (December 1980)
- Created by: Marv Wolfman; George Pérez

In-story information
- Type of organization: Organized crime and terrorism
- Leader(s): Adeline Kane; Queen Bee
- Agent(s): Otto Muller; Talia al Ghul; Deathstroke; Ravager

The Hierarchy of International Vengeance and Extermination (H.I.V.E.) is a fictional terrorist organization appearing in American comic books published by DC Comics.

The H.I.V.E. organization has appeared in Teen Titans and the fourth season of The CW show Arrow.

== Publication history ==
H.I.V.E. first appeared in The New Teen Titans #2 and was created by Marv Wolfman and George Pérez.

== Fictional team history ==
=== First incarnation ===
The H.I.V.E. Mistress as depicted in Tales of the Teen Titans #46 (September 1984). Art by George Pérez.

The H.I.V.E. Master gathers seven unnamed criminal scientists to assist him in taking over the world and eliminating Superman and the Teen Titans. H.I.V.E.'s first known plot involves kidnapping Lois Lane and removing her memories. They subsequently attempt to learn more about the return of Superman Island from space, and hire Deathstroke to kill the New Titans. H.I.V.E. is also responsible for turning Deathstroke's son Grant Wilson into Ravager.

The H.I.V.E. Mistress murders her husband and takes control of his organization. Although clearly insane, she garners the same obedience from her underlings as her husband. The H.I.V.E. Mistress initiates an ambitious scheme called Operation: Waterworks, intending to destroy the underwater city of Atlantis. However, this scheme is merely a display of power which she will use to blackmail world leaders into surrendering to H.I.V.E. The Mistress' plan alerts the attention of former Titans members Aqualad and Aquagirl, who seek assistance from the Titans. The Teen Titans journey to H.I.V.E.'s undersea base, where they starve off the attack against Atlantis and cripple H.I.V.E.'s station. The H.I.V.E. Mistress, refusing to be taken alive, kills the members of her Inner Circle before killing herself.

Remnants of this incarnation of H.I.V.E. were revealed to have become members of the Wildebeest Society, led by Jericho.

=== Second incarnation ===
The second incarnation of H.I.V.E. is established by Adeline Kane, Deathstroke's ex-wife. This incarnation of the group later appears as part of Alexander Luthor Jr.'s Secret Society of Super Villains, having fallen under the control of Queen Bee.

=== The New 52 ===
Following the 2011 Flashpoint miniseries and "The New 52" reboot, the H.I.V.E. acronym was reimagined as Holistic Integration for Viral Equality. Additionally, the organization forms an uneasy alliance with Hector Hammond. They are led by a world class telepath named the H.I.V.E. Queen who is a zealous devotee of the alien Brainiac, claiming to be his "daughter". To the public, H.I.V.E. is a social media company that connects people to each other. However, their true goal is to kidnap humans with psychic powers and harness their energy to mentally enslave the world for Brainiac's return. Their criminal activities become publicly known following the Psi War storyline, when a roster of powerful telepaths clash in Metropolis. During the battle, their main headquarters located beneath Metropolis is destroyed and their entire plan thwarted.

In a flashback seen during the Forever Evil storyline, H.I.V.E. were responsible for turning S.T.A.R. Labs scientist Caitlin Snow into Killer Frost after she threatened their control of the energy market.

H.I.V.E. is featured in Red Hood/Arsenal. A group of H.I.V.E. soldiers, led by the H.I.V.E. Regal, intend to infect many members of the United States military with a psionic virus that will force them to comply with the goals and ideals of H.I.V.E. However, Red Hood and Arsenal infiltrate the ship during the ceremony and Arsenal disables the bomb while Red Hood fights off the soldiers and kills the H.I.V.E. Regal.

H.I.V.E. returns in Teen Titans (vol. 4). During a trip to New Orleans, the city suddenly comes under psionic attack from the H.I.V.E. Queen. She seizes control of every mind in New Orleans except the Titans, who are shielded by Raven's magic. The mind-controlled citizens then start building psionic amplifiers that will allow the Queen to expand her powers across the United States. After locating the H.I.V.E. Queen, Red Robin and Raven assault her base and defeat her, freeing everyone from her mental control.

=== DC Rebirth ===
In the DC Rebirth relaunch, H.I.V.E. is a financial backer of Meta Solutions, a company founded by the Fearsome Five to steal the powers of metahumans. The company is taken down and the Fearsome Five are defeated by the Titans. H.I.V.E. is shown to have a history with the Titans and previously hired Deathstroke's son Grant Wilson to kill the Titans. To this end, they granted him various superhuman powers, but the strain proved too much and Grant died of a heart attack before he could complete his mission.

== Membership ==
=== First H.I.V.E. ===
- H.I.V.E. Mistress
- Franklin Crandall
- Penelope Lord
- Otto Muller - known as a mad scientist aka "Extractor".

=== Second H.I.V.E. ===
- Adeline Wilson (née Kane) - the H.I.V.E. Mistress of the second incarnation of H.I.V.E.
- Damien Darhk -

=== The New 52 H.I.V.E. ===
- Hector Hammond
- H.I.V.E. Queen (leader)
- H.I.V.E. Regal
- Dreadnought
- Psiphon
- Psycho-Pirate - he was their prisoner.
- Doctor Psycho - he was their prisoner.

== Alternate versions ==
- The Hierarchy for International Virtuous Empowerment, a heroic counterpart of H.I.V.E. from the antimatter universe, appears in JLA: Earth 2.
- An alternate universe iteration of H.I.V.E. appears in Flashpoint, consisting of Adeline Kane, August General in Iron, Captain Nazi, Kimiyo Hoshi, Impala, Naif al-Sheikh, Prince Osiris, Ra's al Ghul, and Red Star.

== In other media ==
=== Television ===
- H.I.V.E. appears in Teen Titans. This version of the organization is a regular evil organization that also consists of the H.A.E.Y.P. ("H.I.V.E. Academy for Extraordinary Young People"), also known simply as the H.I.V.E. Academy, which was founded by an unnamed headmistress (voiced by Andrea Romano), consists of Mammoth, Gizmo, Jinx, and series-original characters Private H.I.V.E., Billy Numerous, See-More, Kid Wykkyd, Angel, XL Terrestrial, I.N.S.T.I.G.A.T.O.R., and Wrestling Star as notable students, is staffed by multiple cloaked faculty, and armed H.I.V.E. Troopers. Additionally, Bumblebee and Cyborg infiltrated the academy as students. In the episode "Final Exam", the headmistress loans graduates Mammoth, Gizmo, and Jinx to Slade, who tasks the trio with attacking the Teen Titans and giving them his name in preparation for his plans. In the third season, Brother Blood takes over the academy following the headmistress' disappearance and has Mammoth, Gizmo, and Jinx sent back for their repeated failure to defeat the Titans. Following a failed attempt at swaying Cyborg, who successfully destroys the academy, Blood develops a rivalry with him while several academy students form the H.I.V.E. Five and, along with the headmistress, join the Brotherhood of Evil.
- H.I.V.E. appears in series set in the Arrowverse:
  - Primarily appearing in the fourth season of Arrow, this version of the group, also known by Star City's media as the "Ghosts", is a decades-old organization led by Damien Darhk, who is served by supporters from around the world willing to commit suicide if they are captured by authorities and Milo Armitage and Phaedra Nixon as lieutenants. They intend to initiate a nuclear holocaust while protecting themselves in an "Ark" under Star City so they can lead humanity's remnants. While they are foiled and dismantled by Green Arrow and his allies, one of H.I.V.E.'s nuclear missiles destroys the town of Havenrock and goes on to inspire the Ragman.
  - H.I.V.E. makes a cameo appearance in the crossover event "Heroes Join Forces".
  - A past version of H.I.V.E. from 1975 makes a minor appearance in the Legends of Tomorrow two-part pilot episode.
- The H.I.V.E. Five appears in Teen Titans Go! (2013), consisting of Jinx, Gizmo, Mammoth, See-More, and Billy Numerous.
- H.I.V.E. appears in Justice League Action. The organization is led by an unidentified H.I.V.E. Master (voiced by Chris Diamantopoulos in his first appearance and Diedrich Bader in his second appearance) and consists of bee-themed foot soldiers who utilize honey-based traps.

=== Video games ===
H.I.V.E. appears in DC Universe Online. The organization is led by Queen Bee and consists of H.I.V.E. Drones, H.I.V.E. Foragers, H.I.V.E. Killer Bees, H.I.V.E. Recruits, H.I.V.E. Royal Drones, H.I.V.E. Stingers, H.I.V.E. Workers, Mortuary Bees, a H.I.V.E. Minder, and Major Honeygut as foot soldiers.

=== Miscellaneous ===
- H.I.V.E. appears in Teen Titans Go! (2004), with original members Rock, who can transmute her body into a rock-like form; Paper, who possesses an elastic body; and Scissors, who can turn his fingers into talons, appearing in issue #16.
- H.I.V.E. appears in Deathstroke: Knights & Dragons, with the Jackal leading a sect and Rose Wilson serving as the "H.I.V.E. Queen".
- H.I.V.E. appears in DC x Sonic the Hedgehog: Metal Legion. The group is led by Brother Blood and fought against by the Titans as well as Tails and Blaze the Cat. Charmy Bee briefly joins H.I.V.E. believing it is a friendly bug-themed club, until he learns the truth from Blaze, and retaliates against Brother Blood for lying to him.
