= Calculator (character) =

DC Comics supervillain

- Calculator as depicted in Birds of Prey #87 (December 2005). Art by Adriana Melo.

Publication information
- Publisher: DC Comics
- First appearance: Detective Comics #463 (September 1976)
- Created by: Bob Rozakis (writer); Mike Grell (artist)

In-story information
- Full name: Noah H. Kuttler
- Species: Human
- Team affiliations: Fearsome Five; Secret Society of Super Villains
- Abilities: Genius-level intellect; Expert strategist and tactician; Trained computer scientist and hacker; Utilizes high-tech equipment; Technopathy; Cyberpathy

Calculator (Noah Kuttler) is a supervillain appearing in American comic books published by DC Comics. Originally introduced as an enemy of the Atom, the character was later redeveloped in the 2000s as a master information broker, hacker, and tactical supervisor to other supervillains, and foil to Batman's partner Oracle. He is also the father of Wendy Harris and Marvin White.

Calculator has been adapted into various media outside comics. Armin Shimerman, Ely Henry, and Jason Spisak have voiced the character in animated series and films. Furthermore, the Calculator appears as a recurring character in Arrow, portrayed by Tom Amandes.

== Publication history ==
Calculator first appeared in Detective Comics #463 (September 1976), and he was created by Bob Rozakis and Mike Grell.

As is commonplace in comics, the character was based on a topical event or trend; in this case, Noah Kuttler took his powers and costume design from the recently popular pocket calculator. His costume had a large numerical keypad on the front and an LED display on the headpiece. By typing on the keypad, he could make hard light constructs appear from the headpiece, similar to Green Lantern's power ring. While using this modus operandi, the Calculator was defeated by Blue Beetle, Atom, Green Arrow, Black Canary, Elongated Man, Hawkman, Batman and Air Wave.

== Fictional character biography ==
Calculator was featured in a series of one-shot adventures in Detective Comics, stealing objects "when they are their most valuable" and fighting many Justice League members. As he was defeated by hero after hero, he began using a special button that analyzes the hero defeating him and prevents him from being defeated by them again by protecting him with a force field. However, he could be defeated by heroes he had not previously encountered, or if his weaponry was turned against him.

The Calculator made intermittent appearances in DC titles over the years, such as Blue Beetle and Hero Hotline. In the 2004 miniseries Identity Crisis, he was revamped as a non-costumed villainous analogue to Oracle; a source of information for supervillains planning heists, offering suggestions of weaponry, assisting with logistics, etc. — but charging $1,000 per question, unlike Oracle, who works pro bono. He became a major player in the Infinite Crisis crossover Villains United as a core member of Lex Luthor's Secret Society of Super Villains. His allies included such villains as Doctor Psycho, Doctor Light, and Deathstroke.

Calculator suffers from severe obsessive-compulsive disorder, unbeknownst to his peers (even though this was hinted at when he was in charge of monitoring Supergirl), and initially controlled this with medication. However, in Birds of Prey, he became obsessed with finding out the identity of Oracle, and this led him toward a mental breakdown. He stops taking his medication and suffers from nightmares about the green mask that Oracle uses as an avatar. In Birds of Prey issue #111, Noah finally meets the woman behind Oracle face-to-face at a computer-industry conference. Both are using aliases, and Noah is prevented from learning Oracle's true identity only at the last possible moment through a stratagem devised by Oracle's allies.

A year after the Crisis, Calculator becomes the leader of the Society, taking over from the deceased Alexander Luthor Jr. The Society has become a union for super-villains, with all major heists being done through the Society itself.

The Society is taken over from the inside out when the villain Libra proves he can trade loyalty for a criminal's deepest desire. This is all part of a successful plan to conquer the Earth and the Calculator is left a groveling witness to various Libra-headed executions. Calculator is there because he is accused of sending computer codes that will help the resistance. The extent of his betrayal is detailed later; he claims to have created an eighth layer of the TCP/IP protocol and used it to set up a hidden Internet, named the Unternet, to coordinate efforts against the Apokoliptans on Earth.

Calculator is revealed to be the father of Wendy Harris when he visits a comatose Wendy at a hospital. In the series Oracle: The Cure, Calculator seeks out the remnants of the Anti-Life Equation to heal Wendy. Wendy recovers from her coma on her own, but is left partially paralyzed. Oracle, who had followed him to the hospital to prevent him from using the Anti-Life equation on Wendy, tells Calculator that he has Anti-Life residue on him which enables her to track him, after which he is thrown out of the hospital by guards.

Calculator gathers together a new version of the Fearsome Five and has them send a nuclear-powered metahuman to destroy San Francisco. His plan is foiled by Kid Devil, who sacrifices himself to fly the metahuman above the city. Calculator also has the Fearsome Five abduct Kid Eternity, who he uses to repeatedly summon the spirit of Marvin White, Wendy Harris' twin brother. Calculator kills Kid Eternity after failing to see Marvin.

== Powers and abilities ==
The Calculator possesses a genius-level intelligence, and is recognized as a skilled manipulator and strategist, with numerous criminal contacts.

In his early career Calculator has used a battlesuit with a large calculator in the chest area. The computers in the suit can accurately predict the actions of any hero or even the Earth itself. A projector in the helmet is linked to the suit and can create items by solidifying the dust in the air. Calculator no longer uses this battlesuit and its whereabouts are unknown.

In the Birds of Prey series, Calculator worked with four other supervillains in his cabal to absorb part of Kilg%re's nanotech into himself and gain technology-manipulating abilities.

== In other media ==
=== Television ===
- An original incarnation of the Calculator appears in Batman: The Brave and the Bold, voiced by Armin Shimerman. This version is an overweight, middle-aged man named Myron who lives in his mother's basement and wears the classic Calculator costume even though it is several sizes too small for him.
- Noah Kuttler / Calculator appears in Arrow, portrayed by Tom Amandes. This version is a career cyber-criminal and father of Felicity Smoak. In flashforwards depicted in the seventh season, which take place in 2040, Smoak becomes the second Calculator.
- The Calculator appears in Justice League Action, voiced by Ely Henry.
- The Calculator appears in the Teen Titans Go! episode "Belly Math", voiced by John DiMaggio.

=== Film ===
- The Calculator was reportedly featured in David S. Goyer's script for Green Arrow: Escape from Super Max as an inmate of the eponymous prison.
- The Calculator appears in Batman: Bad Blood, voiced by Jason Spisak. This version works for the League of Assassins and serves as one of Talia al Ghul's henchmen until he is killed by Alfred Pennyworth.
- The Calculator makes a non-speaking appearance in The Lego Batman Movie.

=== Video games ===
- The Calculator appears in DC Universe Online, voiced by Tracy W. Bush. He gives mission briefings to players in the villain campaign.
- The Calculator appears in Lego Dimensions.

=== Miscellaneous ===
- The Calculator appears in issue #6 of the Batman: The Brave and the Bold tie-in comic.
- Lego minifigures of the Calculator in an armored version of his comics counterpart's costume were released in blind bags as part of a tie-in to The Lego Batman Movie.
- The Calculator appears in the Harley Quinn tie-in comic The Real Sidekicks of New Gotham.

== See also ==
- List of Batman family enemies
