= Zookeeper (comics) =

- Zookeeper as depicted in Teen Titans (vol. 3) #14 (October 2004). Art by Tom Grummett, Lary Stucker, and Jeromy Cox.

Publication information
- Publisher: DC Comics
- First appearance: Teen Titans (vol. 3) #13 (September 2004)
- Created by: Geoff Johns; Tom Grummett

In-story information
- Alter ego: Samuel Register
- Species: Metahuman
- Team affiliations: Secret Society of Super Villains
- Notable aliases: Dr. Register
- Abilities: Metamorphic ability to transform into any animal

Zookeeper (Samuel Register) is a character appearing in American comic books published by DC Comics. He is primarily depicted as an enemy of the Teen Titans. Zookeeper is tied to the backstory of Titans member Beast Boy, having worked with his parents when Beast Boy was a child. Zookeeper gained the ability to transform into animals, similar to Beast Boy, after infecting himself with the virus that gave Beast Boy his powers.

In 2025, Zookeeper was reintroduced to continuity in the series Titans, where he is established to have lost his superpowers to the Amazo army during the preceding storyline "Absolute Power". His powers were accidentally transferred to the hero Beast Girl after the Amazos were destroyed, resulting in him seeking revenge and trying to reclaim his powers.

== Publication history ==
Zookeeper first appeared in Teen Titans #13 (September 2004) and was created by Geoff Johns and Tom Grummett. Following The New 52 reboot in 2011, Zookeeper was absent for years until he was reintroduced in the series Titans (2025).

== Fictional character biography ==
Dr. Samuel Register is a former colleague of Mark and Marie Logan who worked with him in Africa. He despises their rambunctious son Garfield who constantly causes damage in his lab. After Garfield's parents successfully cure him of the virus Sakutia, Register goes on to try to finish their work and inhumanly experiments on animals for which he is nicknamed "Zookeeper".

In the "Beast Boys and Girls" storyline, Register steals a sample of Sakutia in an attempt to mutate it like Garfield's parents did. He accidentally infects himself and every child in San Francisco, gaining purple skin and shapeshifting abilities. When Beast Boy is infected, the virus in him is canceled out and he is cured, losing his own shapeshifting abilities.

Zookeeper injects venom from the Australian funnel-web spider into Garfield and attempts to extract the cure to Sakutia from him. Cyborg and the other Titans keep Register busy while Raven heals Beast Boy. Garfield reinfects himself with Sakutia to regain his powers, defeats Zookeeper, and uses his blood to cure the children.

In Infinite Crisis, Zookeeper escapes prison with help from Mammoth and joins Alexander Luthor Jr.'s Secret Society of Super Villains.

Some time later, Zookeeper is recruited by Superboy-Prime as part of a new version of the Legion of Doom.

Zookeeper is reintroduced in the 2025 series Titans. During the events of Absolute Power, Amanda Waller's Amazo army stole Zookeeper's shapeshifting abilities, which were accidentally transferred to Beast Girl after the Amazos were destroyed. He recreates the serum that gave him his powers, but his body is unable to handle the serum, causing genetic instability that will eventually kill him. Zookeeper sends an army of genetically altered creatures after Beast Boy and Beast Girl in a bid to reclaim his powers and use their DNA to stabilize his body. Cyborg and Robotman destroy the device that Zookeeper was using to influence the creatures' behavior, causing one of the creatures to turn on and eat him. Beast Boy believes that Zookeeper survived being eaten, but will have to survive the creature's digestive process to escape from its body.

== Powers and abilities ==
Zookeeper gained shapeshifting abilities similar to that of Beast Boy after accidentally infecting himself with Sakutia. He is able to turn into a purple-hued version of any animal and shift between forms without reverting to his human form first.
