= Deadline (character) =

- Deadline as depicted in Who's Who in the DC Universe #2 (September 1990). Art by Tom Lyle (penciler), Scott Hanna (inker), and Anthony Tollin (colorist).

Publication information
- Publisher: DC Comics
- First appearance: Starman #15 (October 1989)
- Created by: Roger Stern

In-story information
- Species: Metahuman
- Team affiliations: Killer Elite; Suicide Squad; Secret Society of Super Villains
- Abilities: Intangibility special equipment, master mercenary, skilled hand-to-hand combatant.

Deadline is a fictional villain in the DC Comics universe. He first appears in the story "Deadline Doom!" in Starman #15 (October 1989) and was created by Roger Stern.

== Fictional character biography ==
Deadline first appears as a mercenary with a contract on Starman (Will Payton). He is mentioned to be one of the best and highest paid super-mercenaries, along with Bolt. Other stories suggest that, while Deadline is a master at what he does, he is not as highly regarded as other mercenaries, like Deathstroke or Deadshot.

Deadline appears as a vacationer in Bialya after it is opened up to supervillains. When the country is assisted by the Justice League, Deadline is captured by Guy Gardner.

Deadline later becomes part of a more villainous version of the Suicide Squad propping up the dictatorship in the Bermuda Triangle island of Diabloverde. His team is shown terrorizing civilians for fun. Amanda Waller and her Squad take him out, along with his colleagues, while attempting to remove the dictator.

During the Underworld Unleashed crossover event, Deadline meets fellow mercenaries Deadshot, Merlyn, Bolt, and Chiller, and bands together with them as the Killer Elite, with each achieving their dream assassination. On Deadline's part, it was on a Texas district attorney. While operating within this group, they confront the mercenaries called the Body Doubles. The entire Elite suffers multiple humiliating defeats.

He is hired by King Theisley of Poseidonis to assassinate Aquaman. Despite managing to get Aquaman out of the seas and into the sky, he fails to kill him. He also attempts to kill Steel at one point but fails that as well.

Deadline is shot and apparently killed by Gregory Wolfe at Iron Heights Penitentiary while trying to escape with Deadshot and Merlyn. He is later revealed to have survived due to having been dosed with Joker venom, which possesses healing properties.

In 2016, DC Comics implemented another relaunch of its books called "DC Rebirth" which restored its continuity to a form much as it was prior to "The New 52". A refined, uncostumed Deadline appears in Deathstroke (vol. 4) #15 with his hover discs. Deadline clashed with Deathstroke when the former was hired to kill congresswoman Delores Hasgrove, and the latter accompanied the hero Powergirl, who protected her. Their initial clash began when Deadline seemingly killed Tanya with his infinity rifle, and only ended with Deathstroke severing Deadline's right hand and stealing his signature weapon when the assassin attempted to phase it through the former's Ikon Suit.

Deadline later appears as a member of the Secret Society of Super Villains.

== Powers and abilities ==
Deadline possesses intangibility, which he can use on himself and anything he is carrying while retaining his ability to interact with his equipment and adversaries. Additionally, he possesses golden battle armor, a plasma gun, and flying discs.

== In other media ==
Deadline appears in the Superman & Lois episode "Head On", portrayed by Jason Beaudoin. This version is James Distefano, a terminally-ill prisoner who Intergang arranged to be released and put through an experimental treatment. After receiving a phasing suit, DiStefano takes the name Deadline and raids the Department of Defense (DOD)'s headquarters to steal their data. Despite being defeated by Superman, who damages his suit and traps him in a wall, DiStefano succeeds in uploading the data to Intergang so they can raid other DOD facilities.
