= Jinx (DC Comics) =

Comic book supervillain and leader of the Fearsome Five, part of the DC universe

- Art by Brett Booth

Publication information
- Publisher: DC Comics
- First appearance: Tales of the Teen Titans #56 (August 1985)
- Created by: Marv Wolfman; Chuck Patton

In-story information
- Full name: Unrevealed
- Place of origin: India
- Team affiliations: Injustice League; Fearsome Five; Villainy Inc. Secret Society of Super Villains
- Notable aliases: Jinx
- Abilities: Magic abilities that grant her command of natural elements and probability.

Jinx is a supervillain appearing in American books published by DC Comics. Created by Marv Wolfman and Chuck Patton, she first appeared in Tales of the Teen Titans #56 (August 1985). The character is often depicted as a skilled Indian sorceress and one of the leaders of the Fearsome Five, a group of super-villains most notable for being adversaries of the Teen Titans and its derivatives. She is unrelated to the character of the same name who first appeared in Adventure Comics #488 as an adversary of Chris King and Vicki Grant.

The character has been adapted into other media, including animated films and televisions series, and video games. She made her official live-action debut in the fourth season of the HBO Max series Titans, portrayed by Lisa Ambalavanar.

== Publication history ==
She joined the supervillain group, the Fearsome Five, a frequent enemy of the Teen Titans, Wonder Woman, Superman, and the Outsiders. She has also been a member of Villainy Inc. To date, her real name has not been revealed.

== Fictional character biography ==
Jinx, an elemental sorceress from India, trains in magic as an acolyte within a priesthood temple. Demonstrating exceptional skill and proficiency, she surpasses her peers in magical abilities. After believing herself to have acquired all she could from her master, Jinx kills him and her fellow acolytes. Due to her actions, she becomes a wanted criminal in India. Jinx first encounters the Fearsome Five when they attack the Tri-State prison where she is incarcerated. The Five are defeated by the Teen Titans, but Jinx and Neutron decide to join the Fearsome Five. Jinx remains with the group even after Neutron leaves, but after their next appearance in The Adventures of Superman #430 (July 1987), in which they fight Superman alongside new members Deuce and Charger, the group disbands. Jinx is incarcerated in Alcatraz along with Mammoth and Gizmo.

Jinx is part of Circe's army of female supervillains who are defeated by Wonder Woman and Earth's other superheroines. Shortly thereafter, Queen Clea recruits Jinx into the organization Villainy Inc. With Cyborgirl, Doctor Poison, Giganta, and Trinity, Jinx assists Clea in conquering the dimension of Skartaris.

In a storyline in Outsiders (vol. 3) #12–15 (July–October 2004), Doctor Sivana frees Jinx, Mammoth, and Gizmo from Alcatraz. Having summoned teammate Psimon and brought Shimmer back to life, Sivana puts the team to work for him in a scheme to short sell Lexcorp stock. Following a battle with the Outsiders, the Five urge Sivana to take Lexcorp's nuclear missile facility near Joshua Tree, California. When Sivana refuses, Psimon asserted that they will take it anyway, and in response, Sivana kills Gizmo with a laser blast to the head and severs relations with the remaining four, warning them that he will kill them if they ever cross his path again.

Jinx later appears as a member of the new Injustice League, and is one of the villains featured in Salvation Run. She is one of the villains sent to retrieve the Get Out of Hell free card from the Secret Six.

As part of DC Comics' 2011 reboot of its continuity, The New 52, Jinx is a member of the Fearsome Five, which is part of the Secret Society, and allies with The Crime Syndicate. She is sent with the other members of the Fearsome Five, Mammoth, Gizmo, Shimmer and Psimon, along with Doctor Psycho and Hector Hammond to fight against Cyborg and the Metal Men. She ends up defeated by Lead.

In DC's 2016 relaunch of its titles, DC Rebirth, Jinx appears as a member of the Fearsome Five. She is depicted as having pink hair and the ability to manipulate probability, making her resemble her animated counterpart.

== Powers and abilities ==
Jinx using her powers, in a panel from Outsiders (Vol 3) #15 (October 2004). Art by Tom Raney.

Jinx is a sorceress skilled in the realm of sorcery. She demonstrates a remarkable command over mystical arts, granting her the ability to manipulate the elements at will. With this power, she can transmute the elements for various purposes, such as projecting lightning, creating localized earthquakes, and conjuring potent bursts of magical energy. Jinx's abilities require her feet to maintain contact with the ground. Following DC Rebirth, Jinx is given the additional ability to manipulate probability, similar to her animated counterpart.

== In other media ==
=== Television ===
Jinx as she appears in Teen Titans (2003)

- Jinx appears in Teen Titans (2003), voiced primarily by Lauren Tom and by Tara Strong in the episode "Titans Together". This version is a teenage student of the H.I.V.E. Academy, later a member of the H.I.V.E. Five, who often works with fellow students Gizmo and Mammoth. Additionally, she resembles a witch and sports pale skin and pink hair and eyes. Throughout the series, she battles the Teen Titans until Kid Flash convinces her to reform.
- Jinx appears in Teen Titans Go! (2013), voiced again by Lauren Tom.
- Jinx appears in the fourth season of Titans, portrayed by Lisa Ambalavanar. This version is a thief and grifter as well as a contact of Dick Grayson's.

=== Film ===
- Jinx makes a non-speaking cameo appearance in Teen Titans Go! To the Movies.
- Jinx makes a non-speaking cameo appearance in DC Super Hero Girls: Legends of Atlantis.

=== Video games ===
- Jinx appears as a boss and unlockable character in Teen Titans (2005), voiced again by Lauren Tom.
- Jinx appears as a boss in Teen Titans (2006).
- Jinx appears in DC Universe Online, voiced by Claire Hamilton. She appears as part of the "Sons of Trigon" DLC.
- Jinx appears as a character summon in Scribblenauts Unmasked: A DC Comics Adventure.
- Jinx appears as a playable character in Lego DC Super-Villains, voiced again by Lauren Tom.

=== Miscellaneous ===
- The Teen Titans (2003) incarnation of Jinx appears in Teen Titans Go! (2004). She pretends to return to villainy to infiltrate and undermine the Fearsome Five on the Teen Titans' behalf.
- Jinx makes cameo appearances in DC Super Hero Girls as a student of Super Hero High.
