= Gizmo (DC Comics) =

Name of two fictional characters from DC Comics

- Gizmo as depicted in Outsiders (vol. 3) #13 (August 2004). Art by Tom Raney.

Publication information
- Publisher: DC Comics
- First appearance: The New Teen Titans #3 (January 1981)
- Created by: Marv Wolfman; George Pérez

In-story information
- Alter ego: Mikron O'Jeneus
- Team affiliations: Fearsome Five; S.T.A.R. Labs; Cyborg Revenge Squad
- Abilities: Genius intelligence, brilliant inventor and engineer

Gizmo is the name of two fictional supervillains appearing in American comic books published by DC Comics, primarily as an enemy of the Teen Titans.

Gizmo has appeared in various media outside comics, primarily in association with the Titans. He is voiced by Lauren Tom in Teen Titans (2003) and portrayed by Dov Tiefenbach in Titans.

== Publication history ==
The Mikron O'Jeneus incarnation of Gizmo first appeared in The New Teen Titans #3 (January 1981), and was created by George Pérez and Marv Wolfman.

== Fictional character biography ==
=== Mikron O'Jeneus ===
A bald dwarf who flies around on a jet pack, Gizmo is a genius inventor who can turn seemingly innocuous objects like vacuum cleaners into dangerous weapons. Gizmo created a corporation which supplied technology to various people, including criminals. Hoping to increase his wealth, Gizmo joins the Fearsome Five through an ad placed in the Underworld Star, a criminal underground newsletter, by Doctor Light.

After a number of unsuccessful conflicts with the Teen Titans, Gizmo goes straight for a while and works for S.T.A.R. Labs. His former Fearsome Five teammate Psimon, after having been seemingly killed by his teammates, resurfaces seeking revenge and shrinks Gizmo to microscopic size. Years later, Gizmo returns to his normal size and returns to crime.

In the third volume of Outsiders (2004), Doctor Sivana recruits the Fearsome Five in a scheme to steal money from LexCorp. The Fearsome Five urge Sivana to attack LexCorp's nuclear facility near Joshua Tree, California. When Sivana refuses, Psimon asserts that they will take the facility regardless. In response, Sivana kills Gizmo and cuts ties with the remaining four, warning them that he will kill them if he encounters them again.

Gizmo appears in undead form, summoned by Brother Blood to prevent the Teen Titans from freeing Kid Eternity, in the third volume of Teen Titans. In Birds of Prey, Gizmo is resurrected by scientists working for Macintech Research & Development, a technology company based in Platinum Flats. Gizmo retains most of his brain function, but his body is partially decomposed and missing an eye.

Gizmo returns following The New 52 relaunch, which rebooted DC's continuity. He appears as a member of the Fearsome Five and the Secret Society of Super Villains, which is allied with the Crime Syndicate.

=== O'Jeneus ===
In DC Special: Cyborg issue #5, a new Gizmo debuted who is the son of the original and an alumnus of the H.I.V.E. Academy. He battles Cyborg as a member of Elias Orr's "Cyborg Revenge Squad".

== Powers and abilities ==
Gizmo is capable of creating weaponry by transforming one machine into another, such as converting an ordinary vacuum cleaner into a tank.

== In other media ==
=== Television ===
Gizmo as he appears in Teen Titans Go! (2013).

- A young, unidentified Gizmo appears in Teen Titans (2003), voiced mainly by Lauren Tom and by Tara Strong in the episode "Titans Together". This version is a student of the H.I.V.E. Academy and a member of the H.I.V.E. Five who often works with fellow students Jinx and Mammoth and considers himself Cyborg's rival due to their shared technological knowledge.
- Gizmo, based on the Teen Titans (2003) incarnation, appears in Teen Titans Go! (2013), voiced again by Lauren Tom.
- An unidentified Gizmo appears in the Titans episode "Barbara Gordon", portrayed by Dov Tiefenbach.

=== Video games ===
- The Teen Titans (2003) incarnation of Gizmo appears as a boss in Teen Titans (2005), voiced again by Lauren Tom.
- The Teen Titans (2003) incarnation of Gizmo appears as a boss in Teen Titans (2006), voiced again by Lauren Tom.
- An unidentified Gizmo appears in the "Sons of Trigon" DLC of DC Universe Online, voiced by Michael Wollner.
- The Mikron O'Jeneus incarnation of Gizmo appears in Scribblenauts Unmasked: A DC Comics Adventure.
- The Mikron O'Jeneus incarnation of Gizmo appears as a playable character in Lego DC Super-Villains, voiced again by Lauren Tom.
- The Mikron O'Jeneus incarnation of Gizmo appears in Suicide Squad: Kill the Justice League, voiced by Rick Pasqualone. This version is a transportation expert and supporting member of the Suicide Squad.

=== Miscellaneous ===
- The Teen Titans (2003) incarnation of Gizmo appears in Teen Titans Go! (2004) as a founding member of the Fearsome Five.
- Gizmo appears in DC x Sonic the Hedgehog: Metal Legion This version is a member of the Legion of Doom.
