= Signalman (comics) =

DC Comics supervillain

- Signalman from Detective Comics #466, artist Ernie Chan.

Publication information
- Publisher: DC Comics
- First appearance: Batman #112 (December 1957)
- Created by: Bill Finger (writer); Sheldon Moldoff (artist)

In-story information
- Alter ego: Phillip "Phil" Cobb
- Species: Human
- Team affiliations: Secret Society of Super Villains
- Notable aliases: Blue Bowman
- Abilities: Skilled hand-to-hand combatant Wields various small, compact weapons

Signalman (Phillip Cobb) is a supervillain appearing in American comic books published by DC Comics. He is a member of Batman's rogues gallery.

== Publication history ==
Signalman first appeared in Batman #112 (December 1957), and was created by Bill Finger and Sheldon Moldoff.

== Fictional character biography ==
Phil Cobb, as written, was a gangster with big ideas. He came to Gotham City intent on hiring a gang of his own and making it big, only to be laughed at when he tried to recruit the gang because he had no reputation. Cobb vowed to prove himself to Gotham's mobsters, and when he noticed how modern society was regulated by signs, signals and symbols, he found the inspiration for his criminal career. As the Signalman, he went on a spectacular crime spree using those signs and symbols as his motif.

Ultimately captured by Batman and Robin, he returned for a rematch a year later, and then switched gears as the Blue Bowman, a copycat of Green Arrow. After that, he remained unseen until Detective Comics #466 (1976), where he managed to trap Batman inside the Bat-Signal.

In the years since then, Signalman has also been a member of the Secret Society of Super Villains and, in that capacity, did battle with the Justice League and the Justice Society.

In the series Identity Crisis, it is mentioned that Signalman was kidnapped by Doctor Moon and Phobia, a fact confirmed in the pages of Manhunter, which depicts his torture and seeming death via a video recording. During the "One Year Later" storyline, he appears alive as a drug-addled informant for Black Lightning. In The New 52 reboot of DC's continuity (launched in 2011), Signalman appears as a member of the Secret Society.

== Powers and abilities ==
Signalman has no superhuman powers, but he is a highly skilled hand-to-hand combatant.

=== Equipment ===
He also carries items such as a knockout-gas gun, miniature flares that cause fires, electric "sparks" capable of controlling the signals to the human brain, and a remote-control device in his belt that alters signals of an electronic nature.

== Other versions ==
- Signalwoman, a character based on Signalman, makes minor appearances in Kingdom Come.
- An elderly version of Signalman appears in Batman Beyond, where he is released from prison and reforms before being murdered by an unknown assailant.

== In other media ==
- Signalman makes non-speaking appearances in Batman: The Brave and the Bold. Additionally, Blue Bowman appears in the episode "Deep Cover for Batman!" as an evil alternate universe version of Green Arrow and member of the Injustice Syndicate, voiced by James Arnold Taylor.
- Signalman appears as a character summon in Scribblenauts Unmasked: A DC Comics Adventure.

== See also ==
- List of Batman family enemies
