= Neutron (DC Comics) =

- Neutron's first appearance in Action Comics #525 (November 1981); art by Ross Andru.

Publication information
- Publisher: DC Comics
- First appearance: Action Comics #525 (November 1981)
- Created by: Marv Wolfman (writer); Joe Staton (artist)

In-story information
- Alter ego: Nathaniel Tryon
- Species: Metahuman
- Team affiliations: TNT Trio; Fearsome Five; Intergang; Secret Society of Super Villains; Nuclear Legion
- Abilities: Super strength Durability; Nuclear blasts Flight; Radiation absorption

Neutron (Nathaniel Tryon) is a fictional character appearing in American comic books published by DC Comics, primarily as an enemy of Superman.

== Publication history ==
Neutron first appeared in Action Comics #525 (November 1981), and was created by Marv Wolfman and Joe Staton. Wolfman commented about the character's creation, stating: "...With Neutron it was a matter of coming up with someone potentially more powerful and deadly than Superman had ever faced."

== Fictional character biography ==
Nathaniel Tryon is a petty thug who teams up with two others as the TNT Trio. While on a caper at a nuclear power plant at which he works as a security guard, Tryon is caught in the meltdown of a nuclear reactor, turning his body into sentient nuclear energy that can only be contained with a special containment suit. After learning how to control his energy, and learning that the accident was allegedly caused and covered up by the U.S. government, Tryon kills those responsible for the accident and takes up a criminal career as Neutron. Eventually, he battles Superman, and is defeated and imprisoned. He is later released by the manipulations of Abraxas Industries as part of an apparent work release program, which was part of a propaganda campaign against Superman led by Vandal Savage. Neutron is told to engage in seemingly random acts of destruction. Savage's schemes are later revealed to the public, and Neutron is imprisoned. Neutron is held at S.T.A.R. Labs, but is freed when the facility is attacked by mercenaries hired by the Fearsome Five. Neutron and Jinx temporarily join the Fearsome Five, but later leave.

Neutron joins Warp and Plasmus on a mission from Conduit to assassinate Jonathan and Martha Kent, the adoptive parents of Superman. Superman intervenes and the clash ends with Plasmus and Neutron colliding in a blast that apparently kills them both. Both later appear alive, with Neutron being imprisoned in the Slabside Island prison. Neutron and several other villains are manipulated by Manchester Black into threatening Clark Kent's loved ones. The ensuing confrontation with Superman ends with Neutron disappearing in an atomic blast.

Neutron, from Superman #654 (September 2006). Art by Carlos Pacheco.

=== "One Year Later" ===
After the 2006 crossover miniseries Infinite Crisis, Neutron is working as a villain for hire. He and another radiation-powered villain, Radion, are hired by Intergang to kill Clark Kent. After Kent is hit by a commuter train, Neutron and Radion leave, believing him to be to him dead. However, the accident actually caused Kent to regain his powers.

Neutron is also a member of the Nuclear Legion alongside Professor Radium, Geiger, Nuclear, Mister Nitro and Reactron. The Nuclear Legion is hired by the Secret Society of Super Villains to invade Blüdhaven and assist the Nuclear Family in recovering the source of a radiation leak. While there, the group battles the new Atomic Knights.

In The New 52 reboot, Neutron is a mercenary sent to kill Lex Luthor. However, he accidentally releases Luthor's Amazo virus on Metropolis and is infected, disabling his abilities and afflicting him with cancer.

== Powers and abilities ==
Neutron's body is composed of nuclear energy that grants him superhuman physical abilities and the ability to manipulate nuclear energy. However, he is forced to wear a special suit to maintain a physical form and prevent his radiation from harming others.

== In other media ==
=== Television ===
- Neutron makes non-speaking appearances in Justice League Unlimited as a member of Gorilla Grodd's Secret Society before being killed by Darkseid.
- Neutron appears in the Smallville episode "Injustice", portrayed by Jae Lee. He joins Parasite, Livewire, and Plastique in forming a group to search for Davis Bloome before being killed by him.
- Neutron appears in Young Justice, voiced by James Arnold Taylor. This version gained his abilities through experimentation from the Reach, who activated his latent metagene. By 2056, he becomes an acquaintance of Bart Allen and helps him travel back in time to save the Flash, de-power the present-day Neutron, and change the timeline. While Bart succeeds in doing so, the future Neutron is horrified to discover that this did not change the future. In the third season, the present-day Neutron becomes a counselor at the Metahuman Youth Center after receiving therapy from Black Canary.

=== Video games ===
Neutron appears as a character summon in Scribblenauts Unmasked: A DC Comics Adventure.

=== Miscellaneous ===
Neutron appears in the audio drama Superman & The Neutron Nightmare.
