= Psimon =

DC Comics supervillain

- Psimon as depicted in Outsiders #14 (September 2004). Art by Tom Raney.

Publication information
- Publisher: DC Comics
- First appearance: The New Teen Titans #3 (January 1981)
- Created by: Marv Wolfman; George Pérez

In-story information
- Alter ego: Simon Jones
- Species: Metahuman
- Team affiliations: Injustice League; Fearsome Five; Secret Society of Super Villains
- Abilities: Telepathy; Telekinesis; Mind control; Mental blasts; Memory manipulation; Astral projection; Psychic shields; Psionic energy manipulation; Empathy; Genius intelligence

Psimon (Simon Jones) is a supervillain appearing in comic books published by DC Comics, commonly as an enemy of the Teen Titans.

== Publication history ==
He first appeared in The New Teen Titans #3 (January 1981) and was created by George Pérez and Marv Wolfman.

== Fictional character biography ==
While experimenting with interdimensional travel, theoretical physicist Simon Jones makes contact with Trigon; viewing him as a disposable pawn, Trigon empowers Jones with psychic abilities and orders him to lay waste to Earth so he may conquer it. Jones, now calling himself Psimon, joins Doctor Light's Fearsome Five.

Trigon becomes impatient with Psimon's lack of progress and banishes him to another dimension. The remaining members of the Fearsome Five use a dimensional transmitter to rescue Psimon, but are imprisoned.

In the storyline Crisis on Infinite Earths, Psimon allies with the Monitor. The Fearsome Five, feeling betrayed by Psimon, attempt to kill him. However, Psimon is rescued by Brainiac and the Lex Luthor of Earth-One. He attempts to kill Brainiac after learning of his intentions, only to be killed by him.

Psimon is later revealed to have survived and returns to Earth to seek vengeance against the Fearsome Five. He tracks down Mammoth and Shimmer, who have since retired from villainy, and kills Shimmer. Psimon is defeated and imprisoned in the Slab, a metahuman prison. However, he engineers a prison breakout and escapes.

In Salvation Run, Psimon is among the villains who are exiled to the planet Cygnus 4019. Concluding that escape is impossible, he begins planning to create a new civilization and orders that the female supervillains be restrained and used as breeding stock; Joker is disgusted and kills Psimon by bashing his exposed skull in with a rock.

Psimon is resurrected following The New 52 continuity reboot and the DC Rebirth relaunch. He and the Fearsome Five found Meta Solutions, a business that is ostensibly intended to assist metahumans. The operation's true purpose is to strip metahumans of their powers and sell them to the highest bidder.

== Personality and abilities ==
Psimon possesses powerful telepathic and telekinetic abilities. With his telepathy, he can read and control minds and generate illusions. Psychic dampeners can be used to prohibit him from using his powers, though Psimon can override their effects via physical contact.

== Other versions ==
An alternate timeline version of Psimon makes a minor appearance in Flashpoint as an inmate of military Doom prison.

== In other media ==
=== Television ===
Psimon as he appears in Teen Titans (left) and Young Justice (right).
- Psimon makes non-speaking appearances in Teen Titans as a member of the Brotherhood of Evil.
- The Teen Titans incarnation of Psimon appears in the "New Teen Titans" segment of DC Nation Shorts.
- Psimon appears in Young Justice, voiced by Alan Tudyk. This version is a member of the Light and lover of fellow member Devastation.

=== Video games ===
- Psimon appears as a boss in Young Justice: Legacy, voiced by Jeff Bennett.
- Psimon appears in DC Universe Online as part of the "Sons of Trigon" DLC.
- Psimon appears as a character summon in Scribblenauts Unmasked: A DC Comics Adventure.
- Psimon appears as a playable character in Lego DC Super-Villains.

=== Miscellaneous ===
- The Teen Titans animated series incarnation of Psimon appears in Teen Titans Go! as a member of the Fearsome Five.
- Psimon makes non-speaking cameo appearances in DC Super Hero Girls as a student of Super Hero High.
- Psimon appears in Smallville Season 11.
