= Shimmer (comics) =

- Shimmer as depicted in Outsiders #13 (August 2004). Art by Tom Raney.

Publication information
- Publisher: DC Comics
- First appearance: The New Teen Titans #3 (January 1981)
- Created by: Marv Wolfman; George Pérez

In-story information
- Alter ego: Selinda Flinders
- Species: Metahuman
- Team affiliations: Fearsome Five; Secret Society of Super Villains
- Abilities: Elemental transmutation

Shimmer (Selinda Flinders) is a supervillain in the DC Comics universe. The twin sister of fellow supervillain Mammoth, she is a founding member of the Fearsome Five and enemy of the Teen Titans.

The character made her live-action debut in the second season of the DC Universe series Titans, portrayed by Hanneke Talbot.

== Publication history ==
Shimmer first appeared in The New Teen Titans #3 and was created by George Pérez and Marv Wolfman.

== Fictional character biography ==
Selinda and her younger brother Baran (a.k.a. the supervillain Mammoth) are originally from Australia. Teased by their classmates for being different, the two use their metahuman powers to fight their tormentors, only to be driven out of town by the angry and frightened parents. Selinda and Baran's parents send them to Markovia, where they are put in the care of scientist Helga Jace. While Jace tries to teach the two a sense of morality, they instead turn to a life of crime.

Shimmer is one of the founding members of the Fearsome Five, which she joins after answering an ad placed in the Underworld Star by Doctor Light. Shimmer and the Fearsome Five fought with the Teen Titans on numerous occasions; they also have battled Superman. Shimmer eventually renounces her criminal life and retires, along with Baran, to a monastery in Tibet. Psimon, Shimmer's former teammate in the Fearsome Five, attacks her and kills her by transforming her body into glass.

In Outsiders (vol. 3), Doctor Sivana assembles a new version of the Fearsome Five, including Mammoth. Sivana recruits Mammoth by promising to resurrect Shimmer. Sivana has Psimon reassemble the shards of Shimmer's glass body, then uses his super-science to restore her to life.

In The New 52 continuity reboot, Shimmer is reintroduced as a member of the Fearsome Five and the Secret Society and ally of the Crime Syndicate of America.

== Powers and abilities ==
Shimmer is a metahuman with the ability to transmute any element or compound into any other. The change only lasts for a few minutes and she can only affect materials within a radius of three feet.

== In other media ==
- Shimmer makes non-speaking appearances in Young Justice. This version is a martial artist and member of the Light who works as Kobra's right-hand woman and bodyguard. She later becomes an enforcer under Queen Bee as a member of the sub-group Onslaught and gains metahuman abilities from Reach experimentation.
- Shimmer makes a cameo appearance in the Titans episode "Rose", portrayed by Hanneke Talbot.
- Shimmer appears as a character summon in Scribblenauts Unmasked: A DC Comics Adventure.
