= Body Doubles =

Publication information
- Publisher: DC Comics
- First appearance: Resurrection Man #1 (March 1996)
- Created by: Andy Lanning; Dan Abnett; Jackson Guice

In-story information
- Alter ego: Bonny Hoffman, Carmen Leno
- Team affiliations: Requiem, Inc. Secret Society of Super Villains; Injustice League

The Body Doubles are DC Comics villains created by Andy Lanning, Dan Abnett, and Jackson Guice. They first appeared in Resurrection Man #1 (March 1996) before appearing in their own eponymous miniseries with Joe Phillips on art duties.

== Fictional character biography ==
Bonny Hoffman and Carmen Leno are assassins who work for Requiem, Inc., an agency for hired killers. Bonny, daughter of a crime lord, wants to prove her worth to her father, while Carmen, a former adult film actress, hopes to become a legitimate actress. Both women meet and become assassins and use many types of hi-tech weapons, often concealed in, or disguised as, makeup accessories.

Bonny's uncle Nick hires the Body Doubles for their first job, which brings them into conflict with Resurrection Man. The two later work for a beauty-obsessed alien warrior named Mystress, who wants to use the energies of female superheroes to rejuvenate her appearance, and for whom the Body Doubles kidnap Argent, Power Girl and Deep Blue. The two also try to kill Catwoman during her campaign for mayor of New York City, but they were defeated.

They continue to work for Uncle Nick, murdering assigned victims while pursuing their dreams. The Body Doubles, as of Villains United #1, have joined the Secret Society of Super Villains, as well as having aided the Riddler, Fisherman and several other villains in Gotham City in Infinite Crisis #1. The group rampages, killing several police officers.

The Body Doubles are members of the new Injustice League, and as such are brought to the Planet Salvation, a distant planet filled with deadly technology used by Amanda Waller as a permanent prison for metahumans and costumed villains, forcing them to behave or die. The Body Doubles use the wounded Hellhound, on the pretense of helping him, as a bait to let their group escape from alien beasts. They end up in the main group saved by Lex Luthor, with which they are returned to Earth.

The Body Doubles were seen among the villains sent to retrieve the Get Out of Hell free card from the Secret Six.

=== The New 52 ===
The Body Doubles appear in the relaunched Resurrection Man series. In the new continuity, the two are a romantic couple and, rather than being supervillains, are mercenaries in the employ of an organization that Mitch Shelley (The Resurrection Man) once worked for and which now wants him back to figure out how he returns from the dead. The two have rapid regeneration, able to heal from any injury almost instantly and are shown recovering from electric shocks, broken bones and various physical injuries rapidly. It is implied that they worked with Mitch personally at some point, as they make comments suggesting they knew him fairly well when he worked for the company that employs them though they appear to have disliked him a great deal when working with him.
