= Teen Titans Go! (2004 comic series) =

Comic Book based on the TV series Teen Titans

Publication information
- Publisher: DC Comics
- Schedule: Monthly
- Format: Ongoing series
- Genre: Superhero
- Publication date: (Vol. 1): January 2004 – July 2008
- No. of issues: 55
- Main character(s): Robin; Starfire; Beast Boy; Raven; Cyborg

Creative team
- Created by: J. Torres; Todd Nauck
- Written by: J. Torres; Adam Beechen
- Artist(s): Todd Nauck; Larry Stucker; Dave Bullock; Tim Smith; John McCrea; James Hodgkins; Erik Vedder; Rob Ross; Mike Norton; Sean Galloway; Khary Randolph; Scott Iwahashi; Francisco Herrera; Glen Murakami; Chynna Clugston Flores; Johane Matte; Sanford Greene; Alex Serra; Fabio Laguna; Christine Norrie; Michael Change; Joe Quinones; Ethen Beavers

Collected editions
- Truth, Justice, Pizza!: ISBN 1-4012-0333-7

Teen Titans Go! is a comic book series that was published by DC Comics. It is based on the animated television series Teen Titans, which is itself loosely based on the team that starred in the popular 1980s comic The New Teen Titans. The series was written by J. Torres with Todd Nauck and Larry Stucker as the regular illustrators. The series focuses on Robin, Raven, Starfire, Beast Boy, and Cyborg who are the main cast members of the TV series. Also, the show is circled around other characters from other DC comics.

== Style ==
A typical page of Teen Titans Go!, featuring gags outside of the page margins (a story seen in a flashback from the season 2 finale). Art by Todd Nauck.

Most issues are largely self-contained stories, and include a number of characters outside the core group of Robin, Raven, Starfire, Beast Boy, and Cyborg. Given that character licensing restrictions in DC Comics are different from those on the show, Teen Titans Go! was able to include characters such as Wonder Girl who were not licensed for the series. Each issue contains riddles, sight gags, and jokes played out by super deformed characters outside the page margins.

The series is written to appeal to an all-ages audience that included children, the primary audience of the series. Regarding the target audience for the comic, J. Torres notes that:

As with the show, [we] started out skewed a lot younger... but along the way, I think the producers discovered it was reaching a wider audience. ... [the show] got into some darker storyline, and they introduced a lot more characters, so they expanded on it, and they let the show evolve with the audience, which is what we tried to do with the comic book, as well.

While the comic's stories stand independently, its issues are written so as not to contradict events established in the animated series' episodes. Often, Teen Titans Go! also references episodes of the show, as well as expanding on parts of the series.

== Issues ==
No.	Title
1	Demo
Gizmo creates a way to study the Titans' abilities and weaknesses through an online fight game. Gizmo, Jinx and Mammoth can use what they learned in battle.
2	The Beast Boy Who Cried Wolf
Beast Boy's constant jokes are angering the other Titans. When Starfire is chased by Gordanians, no one believes Beast Boy when he says their teammate is in trouble.
3	Lame
Even being a hero, Cyborg has many problems with the Titans' fans: they consider him very "freaky" and "scary". This changes only when he meets Sarah Simms, a volunteer who looks after disabled children.
4	My Crummy Valentine
It is Valentine's Day, so Cyborg and Beast Boy encourage Robin to take Starfire out on a romantic date, only to show her the "true meaning" of this holiday. Puppet King however intends something to this date.
5	Monster Zit
Raven has a zit, and all the Titans (especially Beast Boy) want to pop it somehow. As Raven's anger grows with the pursuit, the zit also grows, and unleashes great destruction and chaos, such as her demon father Trigon.
6	Storm
Thunder and Lightning begin a fight above the city. Their powers are breaking everything and creating tumult. What's worse, the Titans, instead of stopping the fight, end up joining it.
7	How You Play the Game
Blackfire returns to Earth to seemingly make amends with Starfire, and challenge her to a friendly race across the city. The other Titans do not trust Blackfire, so they follow the race closely.
8	Naked City
Mad Mod, disguised as a stylist, gives special clothes to the Titans that hypnotize whoever wears them. Every citizen also buys Mad Mod's clothes, because of the Titans' popularity with them.
9	War Machine
Gizmo becomes a hard opponent for the Titans, because of his stolen tech. Cyborg begs help to Fixit and his upgrades, but when Gizmo builds a giant robot, only the "Titans Go-Bot 5" can help them.
10	Finding Nero
A strange aquatic creature is scaring the people at the Jump City Bay and seeking something. Nevertheless, the only thing that Starfire and Raven are thinking at moment is "Does Aqualad have a girlfriend?"
11	Countdown
Before the events of "Betrayal", Terra already gained the trust of the five Teen Titans, until she is supposedly kidnapped by Slade.
12	Magic and Misdirection
Mumbo wants to do his thefts without the Titans' interference. So, he makes many magics and tricks to keep them busy. The ending of this adventure is shown as a memory flashback of Terra's in "Aftershock".
13	What Time Is it, Mr. Wolf?
An ill man named Mr. Wolf begs help to the Titans: a place to stay at the Halloween's full moon night because it seems that they are the only ones who can handle his illness. Beast Boy is chosen to watch over him.
14	If You Can't Beat 'Em...
Speedy appears to help the Titans against Plasmus, but Plasmus chugs plenty of toxic sludge and gains the ability to duplicate himself when damaged.
15	Pop Quiz
A new villain called Kwiz Kid kidnapped Kitten. To find them, Robin has to seek various clues and riddles spread in all the city.
16	Beauty & the Wildebeest
Walking in the shopping mall, Starfire finds a little boy, seemingly lost and alone. They don't know that they are followed by three new villains, but these three also don't know this child. The child is later revealed to be the human form of Wildebeest, who transformed when sufficiently angered. This story is set after "Winner Take All".
17	Anger Management
Hot Spot needs to control his angry temperament, so the Titans try many ways to get it. Story is specifically set after the episode "The Beast Within".
18	When Chibis Attack
Suddenly, chibis of the Titans appear without explanation. The cause of the trouble is Larry and his allergy: when he was reading his comic book, he sneezed and the characters went out of it.
19	Song of the Dead
Someone gave Johnny Rancid what he asked for: to sing with a rock band, but in every place that he makes a concert, appear brain-eating zombies.
20	Secret Moves
Atlas appears in the online fight game to challenge Cyborg again. The plan was suck Cy inside of the game. Nevertheless, who "enter" in it are Starfire, Raven and other girls.
21	...Garsaurus REX!
Professor Chang creates a weapon that causes transmutations in its targets. After Chang strikes Beast Boy with the weapon, he is transformed into a large monster who threatens Jump City.
22	The Book & Listen
The first issue with two chapters. The Book: Raven lends the Titans her most terrifying book. Nevertheless, she doesn't want lend it to Beast Boy, because he is very fearful. Then, he decides to "borrow" it and sneak out. Listen: Robin is training with the True Master when he is attacked by robot commandos disguised as monks, and Slade appears to fight.
23	Knockoff!
Red X reappears in the city, but seems what he can be in many places at the same time now. Besides, his new thefts are very strange and maybe it isn't Red X.
24	Power Failure
Katarou finds the gem used by the Master of Games and try trap warriors and use their powers. In the battle, the gem is broken and it changes the powers of the Titans. Now, they must learn with each other's powers.
25	Secret Santa
During Christmas, the Titans need stop Billy Numerous' thefts. After they resolve it, the heroes go back to the Tower and exchange gifts in a "Secret Santa".
26	Call of the Wild
Beast Boy is invited to participate in a movie called "Jungle Boy". While the changeling is busy with scenes and recordings, the other Titans need to stop the HIVE Five.
27	Love Is a Battlefield
During a battle, Overload hides itself inside Cyborg's body, leaving him "unplugged". In this condition, Cyborg wants to go on a romantic date with Sarah, but Jinx will do anything to stop them having a romantic moment and nice time together.
28	Surprises
It is Beast Boy's birthday, and the Titans and the Doom Patrol are making a surprise party. While they prepare, the Doom Patrol relate some stories about him.
29	Night Time
In a sequel to the episode "How Long Is Forever", Nightwing travels back to the Titans' time to straighten out Warp's meddling with Robin's past.
30	Slings and Arrows/The Battery
Slings and Arrows: Aqualad and Speedy fight Trident and his mind-controlled squid. The Battery: Doctor Light tries to steal Cyborg's energized battery.
31	Who Wants Pie?
Cyborg, Beast Boy and Starfire are all contestants on Who Wants Pie?, the new game show sensation. If the Titans want to get out alive and out of the host's control, they will have to solve a bunch of puzzles and brain-teasers.
32	Arena
Beast Boy, Pantha and Gnarrk are kidnapped and forced to fight Private HIVE, in training as a gladiator.
33	The Strangest Sports Story Ever Told
An all-villain team challenges the Titans to a game of baseball, with the safety of Jump City at stake.
34	The Great Race
Kid Flash challenges Más y Menos to a race around the world as a charity fundraiser, but they have to get through both villains and groupies to reach the finish line.
35	Enemy of My Enemy
In a follow-up to issue #32, Private HIVE is cast out of the Lanista's arena in disgrace. General Immortus recruits him for an assault on Titans Tower.
36	Troy
The Titans race to stop the Gordanians from kidnapping all of the world's female heroes to sell them into slavery. The original Teen Titans from the comics (Robin, Wonder Girl, Kid Flash, Aqualad, and Speedy) team up towards the end of this issue.
37	Winterlude
Winterlude: A spell from Mumbo temporarily gives Silkie the capability of speech, and the Titans fight a giant snow-monster Mumbo, with Beast Boy finally defeating him due to his cold. Story from Sparktop: The team helps Beast Boy's old friend Sarah Hunter find her father, who is trapped in an ancient pyramid.
38	It's a Mod, Mod, Mod, Mod World
The Titans are suddenly surrounded by crazed fans, and Mad Mod tries to make them into rock stars.
39	Stupid Cupid
Larry takes it upon himself to play matchmaker and pairing up romantic couples that he thinks should be together as inseparable soulmates: Bumblebee with Herald, Wildebeest with Argent, and Speedy with Cheshire. This episode takes place before "Love is A Battlefield".
40	Nearly Nabbed Me & Lightning in a Bottle
Nearly Nabbed Me: The HIVE Five tell each other stories of how they barely escaped the Titans. Lightning in a Bottle: Professor Chang tries to capture Lightning and sell him as a genie.
41	Bad Girls
New female villains are suddenly causing chaos all over the world, with each claiming to be the daughter of one of the Titans' enemies.
42	Pieces of Me
Robin, Starfire, Raven, and Jericho leave to see a movie while Cyborg and Beast Boy remain at Titans Tower, respectively working on the T-Sub and babysitting Melvin, Timmy Tantrum, and Teether. The children enter Raven's room and mess with her belongings, accidentally causing her personality to split into the "Emoticlones" seen in the TV episode "Nevermore". As the clones run wild through Jump City, it falls to Beast Boy and Jericho to help round them up and put Raven back together.
43	The Fearsome Five
Psimon holds tryouts to assemble a new team of villains that can take the Titans down. Jinx officially becomes a Teen Titan and gets a Titans Communicator.
44	Red Raven
Following the events of "Pieces of Me", Raven realizes that the Teen Titans never captured her demonic red self, who she fears reuniting with and allows to remain free. After speaking with her mother Arella in Azarath, Raven returns to Earth and reunites with her red self, accepting her inner darkness.
45	Biography of a Beast Boy/Cyborg's Story
Beast Boy and Cyborg tell their origin stories on a camping trip with Sarah and her disabled children group.
46	Wildfire
Starfire's origins and of her home world Tamaran are revealed. Starfire's long-lost younger brother Wildfire comes to Earth for a visit, but his strange behavior turns the family reunion into a free-for-all.
47	Regarding Robin/One Morning
Regarding Robin: Batman checks up on Robin from a distance to see how his life is going as Robin grieves on the anniversary of his parents’ death. One Morning: Raven and Starfire start the morning and deal with the latest crime spree in very different ways.
48	Wrong Place, Wrong Time
Killowat is accidentally pulled through a time portal that leaves him stranded in the present, and the Titans must find a way to return him to the future. Raven and Herald open a portal and the Titans have to find which alternate world to send him to. One reality is ruled by the Teen Tyrants, their evil alternate counterparts, and opposed by the Brotherhood of Justice, the good alternate counterparts to the Brotherhood of Evil.
49	Legacy
The Ravager arrives in Jump City to take over the estate of her father (Slade) and carry on his vendetta against the Titans.
50	Graduation Day
A continuation of #32 and #35, and the introduction of the Titans' worldwide training program. Having been abandoned by the Lanista and General Immortus, Private HIVE gives himself a promotion and trains a new squad of supervillains as his foot soldiers.
51	Metamorphosis
Terra's older brother Brion, also known as Geo-Force, storms into Jump City looking for her, but is surprised to learn of the events surrounding her time with the Teen Titans.
52	Dial H for Hero
New heroes start popping up all over Jump City at the same time that the Titans' own powers begin to fail them.
53	Wacky Wednesday/Hot & Cold
Wacky Wednesday: Elasti-Girl recalls an incident where Mento and Beast Boy swapped bodies due to Beast Boy accidentally electrocuting Mento's psychic helmet. Hot & Cold: Kid Flash and Jinx run into a pair of villains, one of whom used to be Jinx's boyfriend. Jinx and Kid Flash eventually share their first kiss.
54	Makes You Wonder
An ambitious high school student is determined to prove herself as a worthy partner for Wonder Woman, even if she has to go right through Wonder Girl to do it.
55	When There's Trouble...
Phobia appears in Titans Tower twisting the Titans' dreams into nightmares to paralyze them with their worst fears. Once all five Titans have been subdued, Phobia contacts the Brotherhood of Evil to report her success, but Silkie sets off an alarm to wake them up. Cyborg quickly updates his internal security programs to keep her from invading his mind again and dispatches her in short order, after which the Titans discuss the creation of a new Titans Tower, called North Tower, Cyborg's New Teen Titans training program, and the threat of Trigon is dismissed. At the end of the issue Cyborg receives an alert about Gizmo and the new HIVE Five, the team then departs to the scene.

== Collected editions ==
The series has been collected in trade paperbacks:

Vol.	Title	Material collected	ISBN	Notes
1	Truth, Justice, Pizza!	Teen Titans Go! #1-5	1-4012-0333-7	Digest size
2	Heroes on Patrol!	Teen Titans Go! #6-10	1-4012-0334-5	Digest size
3	Bring It On!	Teen Titans Go! #11-15	1-4012-0511-9	Digest size
4	Ready for Action!	Teen Titans Go! #16-20	1-4012-0985-8	Digest size
5	On the Move!	Teen Titans Go! #21-25	1-4012-0986-6	Digest size
6	Titans Together!	Teen Titans Go! #26-32	1-4012-1563-7	Trade paperback

== See also ==
- List of comics based on television programs
