= Mammoth (comics) =

Comics character

- Mammoth as depicted in Outsiders (vol. 3) #13 (August 2004). Art by Tom Raney.

Publication information
- Publisher: DC Comics
- First appearance: The New Teen Titans #3 (January 1981)
- Created by: Marv Wolfman; George Pérez

In-story information
- Alter ego: Baran Flinders
- Species: Metahuman
- Team affiliations: Injustice League; Fearsome Five; H.I.V.E. Secret Society of Super Villains
- Notable aliases: The Terminator
- Abilities: Superhuman strength, stamina and durability

Mammoth (Baran Flinders) is a supervillain appearing in media published by DC Comics. Alongside his older twin sister Shimmer, he is a founding member of the Fearsome Five and an enemy of the Teen Titans.

Mammoth has appeared in various forms of media outside comics, primarily those featuring the Teen Titans. He is voiced by Kevin Michael Richardson in Teen Titans (2003) and makes non-speaking appearances in Young Justice.

== Publication history ==
Mammoth first appeared in The New Teen Titans #3 (January 1981) and was created by Marv Wolfman and George Pérez.

== Fictional character biography ==
Baran Flinders and his twin sister, Selinda Flinders, are native Australians. Teased for their differences, Baran, a timid but physically imposing child, was often defended by Selinda. They both used their metahuman powers against their tormentors, resulting in them being expelled from their hometown. Sent to Markovia, under Dr. Helga Jace's care, they were meant to learn morals, but instead turned to a life of crime.

Mammoth is one of the founding members of the Fearsome Five, and becomes an enemy of the Teen Titans, Superman, and the Outsiders. He is highly devoted to his sister Selinda (a.k.a. Shimmer), also a founding member of the Fearsome Five. Mammoth possesses immense physical strength and durability, but is intellectually and emotionally underdeveloped, to the extent that he was once tricked into surrendering to Superman.

Mammoth at one point retires to a Tibetan monastery along with his sister. The two are attacked by Psimon, who subdues Mammoth and turns Shimmer into glass before shattering her body. Mammoth works with his former ally Gizmo, apparently unable to comprehend that his sister is dead.

Mammoth, alongside his Fearsome Five teammates, appears as a member of Alexander Luthor Jr.'s Secret Society of Super Villains.

In Justice League of America (vol. 2) #13, Mammoth appears as a member of the Injustice League. He also appears in the limited series Salvation Run as one of several villains trapped on the planet Cygnus 4019.

Mammoth later appears as a member of the revived Fearsome Five when a resurrected Shimmer breaks him out of jail. He also joins Alexander Luthor Jr.'s Secret Society of Super Villains.

=== The New 52 ===
In The New 52 continuity reboot, Mammoth is reintroduced as a member of the Fearsome Five. The group is shown as part of the Society, which were working with the Crime Syndicate. Mammoth is sent by Grid with the other members of the Fearsome Five, Jinx, Gizmo, Shimmer and Psimon, to team up with Doctor Psycho and Hector Hammond. He ends up being defeated by Gold of the Metal Men.

== Powers and abilities ==
Mammoth possesses superhuman strength and durability, which gives him a degree of protection from energy attacks.

== Other versions ==
Mammoth appears in JLA/Avengers #3.

== In other media ==
=== Television ===
- Mammoth appears in Teen Titans (2003), voiced by Kevin Michael Richardson. This version is a genetically enhanced student of the H.I.V.E. Academy and a member of the H.I.V.E. Five who often works with Jinx and Gizmo.
- Mammoth makes non-speaking appearances in Young Justice. This version is a teenage member of the Light and Kobra who derives his strength from Bane's Venom steroid and the Blockbuster formula and sports grey skin and areas of exposed muscle as a side effect.
- Mammoth appears in Teen Titans Go! (2013), voiced again by Kevin Michael Richardson.

=== Video games ===
- Mammoth appears as a boss in Teen Titans (2005), voiced again by Kevin Michael Richardson.
- Mammoth appears as a boss in Teen Titans (2006), voiced again by Kevin Michael Richardson.
- Mammoth appears in the "Sons of Trigon" DLC of DC Universe Online, voiced by Eric Leikam.
- Mammoth appears as a character summon in Scribblenauts Unmasked: A DC Comics Adventure.
- The Teen Titans Go! incarnation of Mammoth appears in Lego Dimensions, voiced by Khary Payton.
- Mammoth appears as a playable character in Lego DC Super-Villains, voiced by Darin De Paul.

=== Miscellaneous ===
- The Teen Titans (2003) incarnation of Mammoth appears in Teen Titans Go! (2004) as a founding member of the Fearsome Five.
- Mammoth makes non-speaking cameo appearances in DC Super Hero Girls as a student of Super Hero High.
