= Fearsome Five =

Fictional group of comic book supervillains from DC Comics

- The Fearsome Five, from the cover of Outsiders (vol. 3) #13 (August 2004). Back row: Mammoth. Middle row, left to right: Jinx, Psimon, Shimmer. Front row: Gizmo; art by Tom Raney.

Publication information
- Publisher: DC Comics
- First appearance: The New Teen Titans #3 (January 1981)
- Created by: Marv Wolfman and George Pérez

In-story information
- Leader(s): Doctor Light; Psimon; Jinx (formerly)
- Member(s): Mammoth; Shimmer; Gizmo

The Fearsome Five is a group of supervillains from DC Comics who serve as enemies of the Teen Titans and Justice League. The group made its debut in 1981. The group's roster has changed multiple times, and characters from the group have appeared in other media, including the 2003–2006 Teen Titans animated television series.

== Publication history ==
The Fearsome Five were created by George Pérez and Marv Wolfman and first appeared in The New Teen Titans #3 (January 1981), going on to become recurring adversaries for the superhero group. Though deadly, they lack sophistication as criminal planners as well as a cohesive focus or loyalty, and are prone to in-fighting, backstabbing, and disbandment.

== Fictional team history ==
The Fearsome Five are founded by the criminal Doctor Light, who recruited members through an ad he placed in the Underworld Star, a criminal underground newsletter. Psimon is influenced by Trigon, the demon who gave him his powers, and usurps Light's role as leader. The two continue to struggle over leadership for some time.

After Trigon banishes Psimon to another dimension for failing to destroy Earth, the other members of the Five attack the Titans at their newly unveiled headquarters, Titans Tower. The Five attempt to use the Titans' dimensional transmitter to retrieve Psimon, but are again defeated.

The Fearsome Five turn on Doctor Light, expelling him from the group and attempting to kill him. Light escapes and Psimon becomes leader again. The Five later invade S.T.A.R. Labs and free Jinx and Neutron. The group battles Superman, this time with new members Charger and Deuce.

The team disbands shortly after Deuce and Charger's first missions with the Five, with Mammoth and Shimmer retiring. Psimon returns from outer space and systematically seeks revenge on his former teammates. Shimmer is killed, while Gizmo is shrunk to a subatomic size.

The Five from Outsiders #14, art by Tom Raney.

Doctor Sivana assembles Psimon, Mammoth, Gizmo, Jinx, and a resurrected Shimmer to serve him. He put the team to work in a scheme to short sell Lexcorp stock for profit. After a battle with the Outsiders, the Five urge Sivana to take Lexcorp's nuclear missile facility near Joshua Tree, California. Sivana refuses, kills Gizmo, and severes relations with the remaining four members.

In Salvation Run, Doctor Light, Sivana, Psimon, Neutron, Mammoth, Shimmer, and Jinx appear as prisoners on the planet Cygnus 4019. Psimon is killed by the Joker, who smashes his head in with a rock. Neutron is used by Lex Luthor as a power source for a teleportation device and is killed when it self-destructs.

A new Fearsome Five appears following Final Crisis, formed by Calculator and consisting of Mammoth, Crocodile-Boy, Shimmer, Jinx, and new members Nano and Rumble.

Gizmo and Psimon were resurrected following The New 52 continuity reboot. In the Forever Evil storyline, the members of the Fearsome Five are recruited to join the Secret Society of Super Villains.

== Roster ==
=== First Fearsome Five ===
- Doctor Light – Founding member. He fled following a struggle to be the leader of the group.
- Gizmo
- Shimmer
- Mammoth (Baran Flinders)
- Psimon
- Jinx
- Neutron (Nathaniel Tryon)

=== Second Fearsome Five ===
- Mammoth
- Gizmo
- Shimmer
- Deuce and Charger

=== Third Fearsome Five ===
- Doctor Sivana (Thaddeus Sivana) – Leader
- Gizmo
- Mammoth
- Psimon
- Sabbac
- Shimmer
- Jinx

=== Fourth Fearsome Five ===
- The Calculator (Noah Kuttler) – Leader, formed this new version.
- Jinx
- Mammoth
- Nano (Virgil Adams) – A scientist who wields a nano-suit.
- Rumble (John Doe) – Has a power suit that gives him the powers of super-strength and sonic blasts.
- Shimmer

=== Fifth Fearsome Five (The New 52) ===
- Psimon
- Jinx
- Mammoth
- Gizmo
- Shimmer

== In other media ==
=== Television ===
- A variation of the Fearsome Five called the H.I.V.E. Five appears in Teen Titans, initially consisting of former H.I.V.E. Academy students Gizmo, Jinx, Mammoth, See-More, and Private H.I.V.E. After Private H.I.V.E. leaves the group off-screen, Billy Numerous and Kyd Wykkyd take his place, though the group still refer to themselves as the H.I.V.E. Five. Following an encounter with Kid Flash, and the H.I.V.E. Five joining the Brotherhood of Evil, Jinx leaves the group to help the Teen Titans defeat the Brotherhood and her former teammates.
- The H.I.V.E. Five appears in Teen Titans Go! (2013), consisting of Jinx, Gizmo, Mammoth, See-More, and Billy Numerous.

=== Video games ===
The Fearsome Five appears in DC Universe Online, consisting of Doctor Light, Mammoth, Gizmo, Jinx, and Psimon.

=== Miscellaneous ===
The Fearsome Five appear in Teen Titans Go! (2004), consisting of Psimon, Doctor Light, Gizmo, Mammoth, and Jinx, the last of whom is working undercover to undermine the group on the Teen Titans' behalf.
