= Tom Raney =

American comic book artist

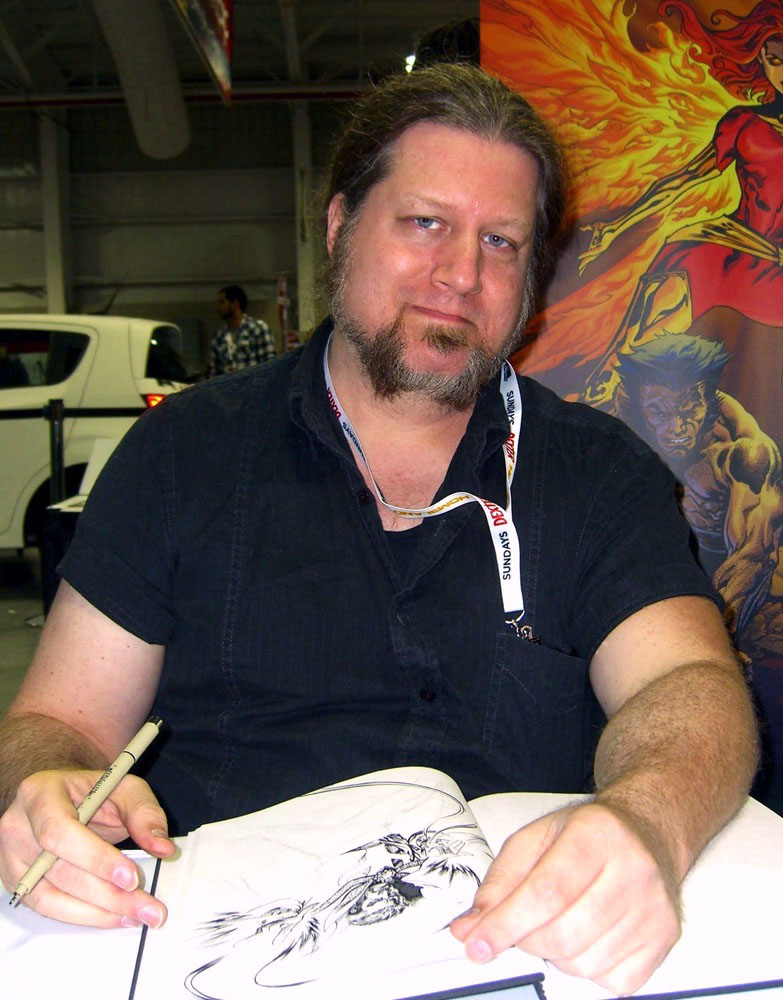
- Raney at the 2012 New York Comic Con
- Area: Artist
- Notable works: Stormwatch, Outsiders

Tom Raney is an American comic book artist known for illustrating titles as Annihilation: Conquest, Alpha Flight, Ultimate X-Men and Uncanny X-Men for Marvel Comics, DV8 and Stormwatch for Image Comics, and Outsiders for DC Comics.

== Early life ==
Tom Raney attended Joe Kubert School of Cartoon and Graphic Art in Dover, New Jersey. In 1986, he met his future wife there, Gina Going. Raney, who was a year ahead of Going in the school's three-year program, was introduced to her by an instructor.

== Career ==
Raney's first paid work was Forgotten Realms for DC Comics. His first work with his wife Gina Going-Raney was The Warlock Chronicles, a series that was published by Marvel Comics.

Raney is best known for his work on such series as Annihilation: Conquest, Alpha Flight, Ultimate X-Men, Uncanny X-Men, DV8, Stormwatch, and Outsiders.

Recent work includes the limited series Dark Reign: Hawkeye, with writer Andy Diggle.

== Personal life ==
Raney and his wife, Gina Going-Raney, married in 1990, shortly after graduation from the Kubert School. They live in Sparta Township, New Jersey, on the eastern shore of Lake Mohawk.

== Bibliography ==
=== DC ===
- Action Comics #801 (2003)
- Batman: Shadow of the Bat Annual #2 (1994)
- Forgotten Realms #17, 20, Annual #1 (1990–91)
- Outsiders, vol. 3, #1-3, 7–10, 13-15 (2003–04)

=== Image ===
- Deathblow #16 (among other artists) (1995)
- Gen 13 #24 (among other artists) (1997)
- Stormwatch #37-50 (1996–97)
- Team One: Stormwatch, miniseries, #1-2 (199)
- Wetworks #11-13 (among other artists) (1995)
- Wildstorm!, miniseries, (Stormwatch) #4 (1995)
- Wildstorm Chamber of Horrors (Savant story) (1995)

=== Marvel ===
- Alpha Flight/Inhumans (1998)
- Annihilation: Conquest, miniseries, #1-6 (2007–08)
- Avengers Academy #7, 11–12, 15–16, 19–20, 23, 25-26 (2010-2012)
- Black Widow: Deadly Origin, miniseries, #1-4 (2009–10)
- Captain America, vol. 2, #7 (among other artists) (1996)
- Civil War: The Return (2007)
- Dark Reign: Hawkeye #1-4 (2009–10)
- Deathlok #20 (along with J.J. Birch) (1993)
- Double Dragon #1-3 (1991)
- Exiles Annual # (2007)
- Incredible Hulks #612, 615 (2010)
- Mutant X #1-3, 5 (full art); #12 (among other artists) (1998–99)
- Namor Annual #2 (1992)
- Secret Invasion: Inhumans, miniseries, #1-4 (2008–09)
- The Sentry: Fallen Sun #1 (2010)
- Silver Surfer, vol. 2, #59 (1991)
- Thor vol. 2, #45-46, 49–51, 55 (2002–03)
- Ultimate Secret, miniseries, #3-4 (2005)
- Ultimate X-Men #66-68, 72–73, Annual #1 (2005–06)
- Uncanny X-Men #291-293, 374, 377–380, 382, 393, 399, 460–461, Annual #15 (1991–2005)
- Warlock and the Infinity Watch #7-8, 12-13 (1992–93)
- What If Magneto have formed the X-Men? (2005)
- X-Factor #76 (1992)
- X-Men, vol. 2 (then X-Men: Legacy) #95, 103 (1999-2000), #241 (2010)
- X-Men: Search for Cyclops, miniseries, #1-4 (2000)
- X-Men Unlimited (Magneto story) #24 (1999)

=== Other publishers ===
- Star Wars #7 (along with Rob Pereira) (Dark Horse, 1999)
