= Alexander Luthor Jr. =

DC comics fictional character

- Alexander Luthor Jr. featured in a portion of a panel from Crisis on Infinite Earths #7 (October 1985). Art by George Pérez.

Publication information
- Publisher: DC Comics
- First appearance: Crisis on Infinite Earths #1 (April 1985)
- Created by: Marv Wolfman; George Pérez; Jerry Ordway

In-story information
- Full name: Alexander "Alex" Luthor Jr.
- Species: Metahuman
- Place of origin: Earth-Three
- Team affiliations: Secret Society; Black Lantern Corps
- Notable aliases: Lex Luthor
- Abilities: Genius-level intellect Ability to manipulate matter and anti-matter Ability to fire offensive energy bursts Ability to form and control dimensional portals

Alexander Luthor Jr. is a character appearing in comic books published by DC Comics. The son of Earth-Three's Lex Luthor, he played a large role in the Crisis on Infinite Earths and Infinite Crisis events.

== Publication history ==
Created by Marv Wolfman and George Pérez, the character made his first appearance in Crisis on Infinite Earths #1 (April 1985). He had a prominent role in that series, and appeared 20 years later as one of the two primary antagonists of the sequel Infinite Crisis, alongside Superboy-Prime.

== Fictional character biography ==
=== Crisis on Infinite Earths ===
Alexander Luthor Jr. is born on Earth-Three, the son of Lex Luthor and Lois Lane. Luthor Sr. is Earth-Three's only hero, fighting the Crime Syndicate (an evil version of the Justice League of America). In Crisis on Infinite Earths, the Anti-Monitor destroys Earth-Three and countless other universes with an antimatter wave. To save their son, the Luthors place him in an experimental device which carries him to Earth-One.

Alexander materializes on the abandoned satellite which was formerly headquarters of the Justice League. The Harbinger takes Alexander in at the request of the Monitor. Alexander's passage through the anti-matter storm grants him power over both matter and anti-matter, accelerating his aging. By the end of Crisis, Alexander has aged into a young adult over the course of several weeks. After the Monitor's death, Alexander helps lead the heroes and villains of the DC Universe against the Anti-Monitor.

After defeating the Anti-Monitor with the help of the Earth-Two Superman (Kal-L) and Superboy-Prime, Alexander reveals that he has saved Kal-L's wife, the Earth-Two Lois Lane, from being erased from existence. No longer having a place in the post-Crisis universe, the four retreat to another dimension.

=== Infinite Crisis ===
Alexander Luthor confronted by Lex Luthor. Panels from Infinite Crisis #3 (February 2006); art by Phil Jimenez.

Infinite Crisis Secret Files reveals how the four survivors spent the years since the Crisis. The survivors have power over the dimension, and it reacts to their thoughts and emotions. Alexander (who has rapidly aged to his mid-30s) becomes colder and more detached from the well-being of the universe's living beings, progressively becomes as corrupt as his father's villainous counterparts. Superboy-Prime is frustrated, and Alexander uses this opportunity to convince him to help fix reality. Playing on his anger, Alexander only shows him negative aspects of the new reality to convince him that it is inferior. Superboy-Prime's efforts frustrate him; he is not as powerful in the post-Crisis heaven, because he has no yellow sun to power him. Alexander eventually reveals that his own powers are returning, and the two combine forces to break through the barrier wall. Together, they set into motion the events that culminate in Infinite Crisis.

Lex Luthor does everything in his power to find his impersonator. Assuming the identity Mockingbird, he organizes the Secret Six. Luthor eavesdrops on Alexander's transmissions for months, and finally confronts him in the Arctic. When Luthor asks who he is, Alexander replies "I'm you. Only better." Alexander also reveals that his presence on Earth has caused Luthor's recent erratic behavior and interference to his thought processes. Luthor is almost killed by Alexander and Superboy-Prime, but escapes by teleporting away.

The Anti-Monitor's corpse is turned into a tower. From a panel in Infinite Crisis #3 (February 2006); art by Phil Jimenez.

Alexander masquerades as Lex Luthor and forms a new incarnation of the Secret Society of Super Villains, who he has construct a dimensional "tuning fork" from the remains of the Anti-Monitor to recreate the multiverse. The device requires a vast power source to operate, which Alexander generates by manipulating the Spectre into destroying magic. With sorcerers dead and their resulting control over magic extinguished, the result is a raw form of magic that the device can tap into. Alexander programs the tower by granting sentience to the Brother Eye satellite, allowing the system to evolve into a brain capable of directing the tower's energies and mapping the new multiverse to help him find the perfect Earth he seeks.

As Alexander attempts to combine Earth-Two and Earth-Three, Firestorm converts all the energy the heroes are firing at the rip into raw positive matter. Immediately after, Nightwing, Wonder Girl and Superboy arrive at the tower and free the captives. Superboy-Prime enters the fray and battles Superboy, which ends in Superboy's death. The tower is destroyed, causing the multiverse to collapse once more.

=== Death ===
Lex Luthor and the Joker find Alexander hiding in an alley in Gotham City. Alex broods over the failure of his plans when he is distracted by a noise from further down the alley. The Joker mutilates Alexander's face and Luthor taunts his imposter for his mistakes, including underestimating Luthor and excluding the Joker from the Society for his unpredictable nature. The Joker then shoots Alexander in the head, killing him.

In the 2009–10 Blackest Night storyline, Alexander Luthor is revealed to have been entombed below the Hall of Justice. Shortly afterward, he is resurrected as a member of the Black Lantern Corps. Alexander uses his Black Lantern ring to resurrect Superboy-Prime's victims, who he works with to attack Prime. Prime voluntarily puts on a Black Lantern ring, which generates a burst of rainbow energy that destroys the Black Lanterns.

Alexander next appears in Justice League of America in 2011. The Crime Syndicate of America works with Doctor Impossible's team to steal Alexander's corpse, intending to resurrect him in the Chamber of Resurrection. At the last moment, Doctor Impossible apparently betrays the Syndicate and substitutes Alexander's corpse for himself to resurrect Darkseid. This attempt instead creates a new villain called Omega Man. Alexander is temporarily resurrected by the Tangent universe's Green Lantern, allowing him to help defeat Omega Man and the Crime Syndicate.

== Powers and abilities ==
Alexander Luthor Jr. possesses a genius-level intellect and is a master manipulator. The circumstances of his escape from Earth-Three give him power over matter and antimatter, which he can use to generate energy bursts and dimensional portals. He also has a form of precognition, enabling him to foresee the most probable events.

== Other versions ==
=== Mazahs ===
Mazahs is a corrupted alternate-universe version of Shazam, introduced in the 2013 storyline Forever Evil. He is the super-powered alter-ego of Lex Luthor of Earth-3. While Prime Earth's Shazam is known for sharing his powers with others, Mazahs kills other superbeings and takes their powers for his own, as when he kills the Syndicate's speedster Johnny Quick. It is implied that the power of Mazahs previously belonged to Earth-3's Will Batson before he was killed by Luthor. In the final issue of the series, it is revealed that Superwoman is in a relationship with Luthor and tricked her teammates into bringing him with them. She also reveals she is carrying his child, who is prophesied to bring an end to the world. Exploiting his ability to use the powers of those he has killed, Mazahs easily takes down both the Syndicate and Luthor's team, but Prime Earth Lex Luthor (having the same voice as Mazahs) manages to call down the lightning, reverting Mazahs to his human form. After sealing Alexander's mouth, Luthor kills him.

Superwoman later gives birth to Mazahs's child and uses the baby's power-stealing abilities, inherited from his father, to remove abilities the members the Prime-Earth Justice League had inherited from their time on Apokolips after the death of Darkseid. The baby absorbs the Omega Effect from Lex Luthor and the Anti-Life Equation from Steve Trevor, transforming him into a host body for Darkseid.

== In other media ==
Alexander Luthor Jr. appears as a character summon in Scribblenauts Unmasked: A DC Comics Adventure.
