= Doctor Light (DC Comics) =

Comic book character

- The Arthur Light (left) and Kimiyo Hoshi (right) incarnations of the character.

Publication information
- Publisher: DC Comics
- First appearance: Light: Justice League of America #12 (June 1962); Hoshi: Crisis on Infinite Earths #4 (July 1985)
- Created by: Light: Gardner Fox, Mike Sekowsky; Hoshi: Marv Wolfman, George Pérez

In-story information
- Alter ego: Arthur Light; Kimiyo Hoshi
- Species: Human
- Team affiliations: Light: The Society; Fearsome Five; Suicide Squad; Injustice Gang; Injustice League; Black Lantern Corps; A.R.G.U.S. Justice League; Hoshi: Justice League International; Doom Patrol; Kord Enterprises; Birds of Prey; Outsiders; S.T.A.R. Labs; Justice League; Justice League Europe
- Abilities: Both versions possess a genius-level intelligence and unparalleled light-based manipulation powers derived from two different sources.

Doctor Light is the name of two characters appearing in American comic books published by DC Comics. The original version of the character was created by Gardner Fox and Mike Sekowsky and first appeared in Justice League of America #12 (1962). Since the original's publication, the character has functioned as a adversary of both the Teen Titans and Justice League. The second version of the character is a superheroine, with both of them sharing the same power set and a history.

The original version is Dr. Arthur Light, a criminal and S.T.A.R Labs physicist who appropriated his colleagues' light-manipulating technology and became an adversary of the Justice League and Teen Titans. His history with the latter was retroactively revealed to be, in part, due to having been lobotomized by Zatanna and the Justice League to weaken him after his sexual assault of Sue Dibny proved him a threat to League members' secret identities in relation to their loved ones, thus diminishing his abilities and intellect. He would regain his memories and intelligence and sought revenge. Eventually, he is killed by the Spectre, who turns him into a candle. Following The New 52, he is alternatively portrayed as a employee of A.R.G.U.S. and the husband of the later version of Doctor Light. His villainous portrayal is restored following DC Rebirth.

The second version of the character is Dr. Kimiyo Hoshi, a Japanese astronomer who followed tradition by marrying young and having children. However, she would defy tradition and divorced her husband, making her a single mother. Hoshi was introduced in the Crisis on Infinite Earths storyline, where she was empowered by the Monitor to combat the Anti-Monitor. Becoming a superhero, she would use her abilities as a member of the Justice League while balancing out her life as a hero with her life as a both single mother and a particularly driven woman. She would also cross paths with Arthur Light, whose technology was based upon both her father's and his collaborator, Jacob Finlay. Following The New 52, Hoshi's history with Arthur Light was altered, making him her ex-husband.

The Arthur Light incarnation was ranked in 2009 as IGN's 84th-greatest comic book villain of all time. Conversely, the Kimiyo Hoshi incarnation is regarded as one of the more noteworthy Asian superheroes in DC Comics. Both versions have appeared in media outside comics. In live-action, Arthur Light appeared in Titans, portrayed by Michael Mosley. Additionally, Rodger Bumpass voices Light in the animated series Teen Titans (2003) and Teen Titans Go! (2013). Kimiyo Hoshi appears in the sixth season of the television series The Flash, portrayed by Emmie Nagata.

== Publication history ==
Arthur Light first appeared in Justice League of America #12 and was created by Gardner Fox and Mike Sekowsky. During the 1980s, Doctor Light was transitioned from a serious menace to a comedic villain, a transformation which culminated in the DC Comics Bonus Book appearing in The Flash (vol. 2) #12 (May 1988). The second Doctor Light, Kimiyo Hoshi, would later first debut in Crisis on Infinite Earths #4 and was created by Marv Wolfman and George Pérez.

== Fictional character biographies ==
=== Arthur Light ===
Arthur Light is the second Doctor Light. His predecessor was his partner at S.T.A.R. Labs, scientist Jacob Finlay. Finlay created a technologically advanced suit to control light allowing him to be a minor superhero, but was accidentally killed by Light, who took the suit and the Doctor Light codename. Light is periodically haunted by Finlay's ghost through the years, but uses the light generated by the suit to drive him off. Through the Silver and Bronze Ages, Doctor Light is a minor but persistent foe for a number of heroes, including the Justice League and the Teen Titans. Light founds the supervillain team the Fearsome Five, but they are defeated by the Titans and Light is expelled from the group.

Driven by self-doubt and guilt, thanks in part to Finlay's presence, Light volunteers for the Suicide Squad, a group of incarcerated supervillains who perform dangerous missions for the U.S. government in exchange for clemency. During a mission on Apokolips, Light is killed by Parademons and sent to Hell, where he is reunited with Finlay. Light is resurrected and attempts to rejoin the Suicide Squad, but is rejected by Amanda Waller.

==== Identity Crisis onwards ====
The 2004 miniseries Identity Crisis retroactively reveals that Doctor Light had raped Sue Dibny, wife of the superhero Elongated Man. Later issues reveal that he was a serial rapist. The Justice League resolve to alter his mind with Zatanna's magic so that he will no longer pose a threat. In the process, they accidentally give him a partial lobotomy, thus explaining how he fell from a plausible foe of the Justice League to a punching bag. Light later recovers his memories and intellect when witnessing a fight between the League members responsible for his mind-wipe and Deathstroke, and vows revenge against the Justice League. To this end, he joins the Secret Society of Super Villains.

==== The New 52 ====
In 2011, "The New 52" rebooted the DC universe. Arthur Light is a scientist working with A.R.G.U.S. and the Justice League. As he is studying a communicator used by the Secret Society of Super Villains, Light receives a "nasty call" and is engulfed in an explosion of light, leaving his body glowing on the floor. Director Amanda Waller finds him transformed. Light becomes a reluctant member of the new Justice League. Doctor Light later resurfaces, now sporting his classic appearance. He states that his human body is dead and that he now exists as a construct of living light. Having been cut off from his wife and daughters, Light flees to Chetland, where he is given asylum in exchange for his services. After a conversation with Deathstroke, Light contemplates returning to villainy.

=== Kimiyo Hoshi ===
Kimiyo Tazu Hoshi, a brilliant but overly-driven scientist, is the supervising astronomer at an observatory in Japan during Crisis on Infinite Earths. The Monitor decides that he needs additional forces to turn the war against the Anti-Monitor in his favor. To this end, he sends a devastating beam of energy which strikes Hoshi, giving her light-based superpowers. Hoshi, granted the ability to understand English, accompanies several heroes to the anti-matter universe to confront the Anti-Monitor. She and Superman soon discover the machines that the villain has deployed to destroy the remaining Earths. When Anti-Monitor ambushes Superman, Doctor Light defends Superman until Supergirl arrives, sacrificing herself so that Superman can be brought to safety.

Doctor Light has joined the Justice League a few times over the years, most notably as a member of Justice League Europe during the latter half of its incarnation. She also joins the Doom Patrol for a time and enters a relationship with Global Guardians member Rising Sun.

Despite resigning from active duty, Doctor Light appears as one of the numerous heroes assembled at Washington, D.C. to break an energy dome trapping the Justice League and the Crime Syndicate of America within the city, as well as a member of the JLA's reserve roster during the team's battle against Eclipso. She also assists the League (as well as several other teams) during a battle against the Secret Six, where she is gunned down by Deadshot.

==== DC Rebirth ====
Hoshi appears in the Rebirth storyline Heroes in Crisis and is among many superheroes who are interviewed in the Sanctuary therapy center. She and Arthur Light were formerly married, during which they had three children: Tommy, Emma, and Sakura.

== Powers and abilities ==
The Arthur Light incarnation of Doctor Light can control light for a variety of purposes. He can bend the light around him to become invisible, generate blasts of energy, create force fields, and fly. By mentally repulsing photons, Light can create areas of complete darkness. The limits of his powers are unclear, but he seems to be able to wrest control of anything that emits light. He also has the ability to create holographic images.

The Kimiyo Hoshi incarnation of Doctor Light can absorb and project energy, allowing her to shoot destructive laser beams and other blasts of energy. Light can transform into light, rendering her invisible to the naked eye. Her abilities also allow her to disperse radiation and holographic illusions, scan and "see" the electromagnetic spectrum, track ionized molecules, and convert her body to near light to minimize her mass and escape gravitational pull. She can sense the light around her, which is described as a "sixth sense".

== Other versions ==
- An unrelated Doctor Light, predating Arthur Light, was an enemy of Doctor Mid-Nite. The unnamed man who would become Doctor Light held a faculty position at Ivy League University until he was fired for conducting dangerous experiments on university grounds. In response, he became Doctor Light, a criminal who wields light-based technology.
- Jacob Finlay is a scientist and co-worker of Arthur Light who invented the Light Suit consisting of light technology. He became Doctor Light and stopped a spy that was sent by S.T.A.R. Labs. The next day, Finlay is repairing the light rig when Arthur Light accidentally activates it, killing Finlay. Haunted by Finlay's ghost, Light becomes Doctor Light.

== In other media ==
=== Television ===
Dcotor Light as depicted in Teen Titans (2003–2006) and Teen Titans Go! (2013–present)
- An original incarnation of Doctor Light appears in the Lois & Clark: The New Adventures of Superman episode "The Eyes Have It", portrayed by David Bowe. This version is Harry Leit, a scientist who stole an ultraviolet light beam from Dr. Neal Faraday and used it to blind Superman.
- The Arthur Light incarnation of Doctor Light appears in Teen Titans (2003), voiced by Rodger Bumpass.
- The Kimiyo Hoshi incarnation of Doctor Light appears in Justice League Unlimited, voiced by Lauren Tom. This version is a member of the Justice League.
- The Arthur Light incarnation of Doctor Light appears in Teen Titans Go! (2013), voiced primarily by Rodger Bumpass and by Scott Menville in the episode "Colors of Raven".
- Two incarnations of Doctor Light appear in The Flash.
  - An original incarnation of Doctor Light appears in the second season, portrayed by Malese Jow. This version is the Earth-2 counterpart of Linda Park and a criminal working for Zoom.
  - The Kimiyo Hoshi incarnation of Doctor Light, portrayed by Emmie Nagata. This version is a metahuman assassin who works for Black Hole.
- The Kimiyo Hoshi incarnation of Doctor Light makes non-speaking appearances in Justice League Action.
- The Arthur Light incarnation of Doctor Light appears in the second season of Titans, portrayed by Michael Mosley. This version is a former physicist at the California Institute of Technology who acquired powers from a failed experiment involving light manipulation, became a criminal, and fought the Titans before being incarcerated in San Quentin State Prison. Four years later, Light escapes from prison and joins forces with Deathstroke to defeat the Titans, only to mistakenly believe their plan went awry and leave to fulfill it himself, leading to Deathstroke killing him.

=== Film ===
- The Arthur Light incarnation of Doctor Light appears in Justice League: The New Frontier.
- The Arthur Light incarnation of Doctor Light appears in Superman vs. The Elite.
- An alternate universe version of Kimiyo Hoshi appears in Justice League: Gods and Monsters. This version is a member of Lex Luthor's "Project Fair Play", a contingency program meant to destroy their universe's Justice League if necessary, until the Metal Men kill her and the other scientists involved.
- The Kimiyo Hoshi incarnation of Doctor Light appears in DC Super Hero Girls: Hero of the Year.
- The Arthur Light incarnation of Doctor Light appears in Teen Titans Go! To the Movies.
- The Kimiyo Hoshi incarnation of Doctor Light appears in Justice League: Crisis on Infinite Earths, voiced by Erika Ishii.

=== Video games ===
- The Arthur Light incarnation of Doctor Light appears in Teen Titans (2005), voiced again by Rodger Bumpass.
- The Arthur Light incarnation of Doctor Light appears as an unlockable character in Teen Titans (2006) via the "Master of Games" mode.
- The Arthur Light and Kimiyo Hoshi incarnations of Doctor Light appear in DC Universe Online.
- The Arthur Light and Kimiyo Hoshi incarnations of Doctor Light appear as character summons in Scribblenauts Unmasked: A DC Comics Adventure.
- The Arthur Light incarnation of Doctor Light appears as a playable character in Lego DC Super-Villains, voiced again by Rodger Bumpass.

=== Miscellaneous ===
- A DC Animated Universe-inspired incarnation of Arthur Light / Doctor Light appears in Adventures in the DC Universe #1, Justice League Adventures, and DC Comics Presents: Wonder Woman Adventures #1.
- The Teen Titans (2003) incarnation of Arthur Light / Doctor Light appears in Teen Titans Go! (2004).
- The Kimiyo Hoshi incarnation of Doctor Light makes non-speaking appearances in DC Super Hero Girls.
