= Wildebeest (character) =

Character in DC Comics

Wildebeest is the name of several characters appearing in American comic books published by DC Comics, primarily in association with the Teen Titans. The first Wildebeest is a moniker shared by members of the Wildebeest Society, a cartel that battled the Titans on multiple occasions. The second Wildebeest, Baby Wildebeest, is a creature created by the Society who was adopted by the Titans.

== History ==
=== Wildebeest ===
The first Wildebeest is a poacher, mercenary, and enemy of Chris King and Vicki Grant.

=== Wildebeest Society ===
The second Wildebeest is the founder of the Wildebeest Society, a criminal cartel that conducts underhanded affairs for financial gain. Although the Society has many members (some of them having previously worked for H.I.V.E.), only one Wildebeest operates publicly, giving the illusion that all of their crimes are committed by a single individual.

The Wildebeest Society later falls under the control of former Teen Titans member Jericho, who has been possessed by the spirits of Azarath. Under the leadership of Jericho, the Wildebeest Society creates artificial host bodies for the spirits to possess. All of their experiments fail except for the human/panther hybrid X-24, who escapes and vows vengeance on the Wildebeest Society. Jericho captures the Teen Titans so they can serve as host bodies, but the Titans are rescued by Pantha, Arella, Phantasm, Red Star, and Jericho's father Deathstroke. During the battle, Jericho is killed by Deathstroke. The final experiment by the Wildebeest Society, Baby Wildebeest, is taken into the Teen Titans' custody.

=== Baby Wildebeest ===
Baby Wildebeest is one of two creations of the Wildebeest Society, the other being Pantha. After dismantling the Society, the Titans adopt Baby Wildebeest, who regards Pantha as his mother. Baby Wildebeest was killed by Superboy-Prime during the 2005 event Infinite Crisis and has remained dead since.

=== New Wildebeests ===
The demonic supervillain Goth allies with Contessa Erica Alexandra de Portanza to create upgraded versions of the Wildebeests which resemble monstrous, anthropomorphic versions of their namesake. Goth commands the Wildebeests to attack JFK International Airport and Grand Central Station before they are defeated by the Titans. Another set of Wildebeests are encountered in Brooklyn by Beast Boy and Flamebird later encounter a separate group of Wildebeests, who were tamed by an unnamed man.

=== Cybernetic Wildebeest ===
When Starfire and Tim Drake are abducted from Titans Tower, the Teen Titans work with the Outsiders to find them. Nightwing tracks them to the basement of Titans Tower, where they are being held captive by a cybernetically enhanced Wildebeest. The Teen Titans and the Outsiders defeat the Wildebeest and intend to ship it to S.T.A.R. Labs. However, the Wildebeest's creator intercepts the transport carrying it.

It is later revealed that the Wildebeest was created by Project M, an experimental super-soldier program led by Elias Orr, and that its cybernetic parts were based on Cyborg's technology.

== Powers and abilities ==
The members of the Wildebeest Society are skilled tacticians and wear strength-boosting exoskeletons, resembling a monstrous, humanoid version of their namesakes. The New Wildebeests are wildebeest hybrids who possess enhanced strength, while the Cybernetic Wildebeest is cybernetically enhanced.

== In other media ==
=== Television ===
- Wildebeest appears in Teen Titans, voiced initially by Jim Cummings and subsequently by Dee Bradley Baker. This version is an honorary member of the Teen Titans.
- Wildebeest makes a cameo appearance in the Teen Titans Go! (2013) episode "Campfire Stories".

=== Video games ===
- Wildebeest appears in Teen Titans (2005), voiced again by Dee Bradley Baker.
- Wildebeest appears as a character summon in Scribblenauts Unmasked: A DC Comics Adventure.

=== Miscellaneous ===
The Teen Titans animated series incarnation of Wildebeest appears in Teen Titans Go! (2004), which reveals him to be a metahuman child with the ability to transform into a wildebeest hybrid.
