= Arella =

DC Comics character

Publication information
- Publisher: DC Comics
- First appearance: New Teen Titans #3 (February 1981)
- Created by: Marv Wolfman; George Pérez

In-story information
- Alter ego: Angela Roth
- Species: Human
- Place of origin: Gotham City, Earth
- Team affiliations: Monks and Nuns of the mystical world of Azarath
- Notable aliases: Arella

Angela Roth, commonly called Arella, is a fictional character from DC Comics. She is the pacifist mother of the superheroine Raven in the Teen Titans comics and animated series. She is the former bride of the all-powerful interdimensional demon Trigon, who had cunningly seduced her, in human form, to have someone to bear a half-human, half-demon daughter who becomes Raven.

== Fictional character biography ==
Born in Gotham City, Angela Roth was a depressed, aimless teenager who fell in with cultists after running away from home. The members of the cult promised to keep her fed and well-rested in exchange for taking part in a secret ritual to appeal to Trigon, who was to manifest on Earth. Although she knew Trigon was a demon, she thought his handsome human form was authentic when he first appeared to her. Upon discovering his true form, Angela became horrified, but was unable to escape Trigon, who continued to assault her. After impregnating Angela, Trigon returned her to Earth to keep her away from his enemies. After failing to receive any help from state agencies, Angela attempted to kill herself with sleeping pills in an abandoned alleyway. Instead of dying, Angela was taken to the interdimensional temple of Azarath and changed her name to Arella, meaning "Messenger Angel".

Soon after giving birth to Raven, Arella gave up her maternal care to the priestess Azar. She rarely saw Raven for quite some time, but took over guardianship of Raven upon Azar's death when Raven was about ten years old.

When Raven turned 18, she fled Azarath to seek help from Earth's superheroes to stop Trigon's invasion. This resulted in the New Teen Titans. Raven briefly returned to Azarath, asking her mother for help. Arella refused and sent her back to Earth. When Raven was being held as a prisoner by Trigon, Arella decided to leave Azarath to help her teammates rescue her. Soon after, Trigon was sealed in another dimension. Arella agreed to go along with him in an attempt to block him from returning through the portal.

Some time later, Raven finally gave in to her father's control. Arella was transported to Azarath, which was promptly destroyed by Trigon's minions. She was among the few survivors. Arella followed the Teen Titans to Earth to help them in their fight against Trigon and release her daughter. She watched as Raven was used to destroy her father and then vanish.

Arella traveled the world, trying to find her daughter. When she finally found her, they were both taken prisoner by cultists under the control of Brother Blood. After spending some time with her daughter in Blood's fortress, they were freed by the Teen Titans.

After this event, Arella establishes a ranch that would serve as a sanctuary to troubled women. However, the Wildebeest Society kills all of the women and the workers, leaving only Arella alive. She is rescued by Deathstroke. Arella, Deathstroke, and Steve Dayton work to free the kidnapped Titans from Jericho's Wildebeest Society. When Deathstroke kills Jericho, the corrupted souls of Azarath leave him and possess Raven, turning her evil once more. Arella and Danny Chase sacrifice themselves to stop Raven, merging with the souls of Azarath into Phantasm.

== In other media ==
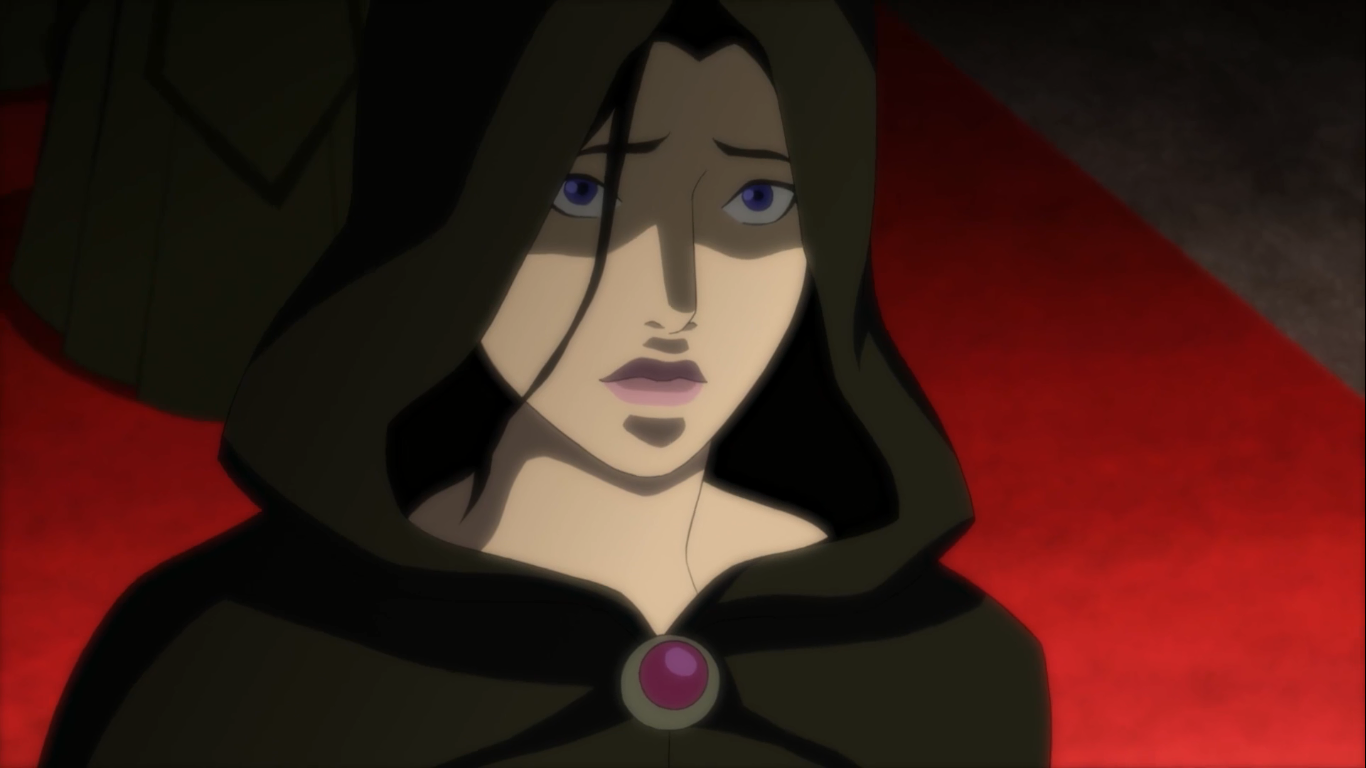
Arella as depicted in Justice League vs. Teen Titans.

- Arella appears in the Teen Titans episode "The Prophecy", voiced by Virginia Madsen. This version was killed when Trigon destroyed Azarath.
- Arella appears in a flashback in Justice League vs. Teen Titans. This version was killed when Trigon destroyed Azarath.
- Two characters based on Arella named Melissa Roth (portrayed by Sherilyn Fenn) and Angela Azarath (portrayed by Rachel Nichols) appear in Titans. Melissa is depicted as Raven's adoptive mother who poses as her biological mother before being killed by a man seeking to kill her. Angela is Trigon's lover who was previously imprisoned in Agnews Asylum before being freed by the Titans, and manipulates Rachel into summoning Trigon before being killed by him.
- Arella appears in Teen Titans Go! #44.
- Arella appears as a character summon in Scribblenauts Unmasked: A DC Comics Adventure.
