= Bushido (character) =

Publication information
- Publisher: DC Comics
- First appearance: Titans Annual #1 (2000)
- Created by: Geoff Johns; Ben Raab

In-story information
- Alter ego: Ryuko Orsono
- Species: Human
- Team affiliations: Titans L.A. Black Lantern Corps
- Abilities: Highly trained swordsman. He also carries weapons imbued with the soul of the warriors who wielded it that guide him in battle.

Bushido (Ryuko Orsono) is a superhero appearing in media published by DC Comics. The character is originally from Japan and is a member of the Teen Titans. He is a skilled swordsman, with his weapons connecting him to the spirits of their original wielders. Bushido was killed by Superboy-Prime during the Infinite Crisis storyline in 2006 and has not returned since his death, though he was temporarily resurrected as a member of the Black Lantern Corps in the Blackest Night storyline.

Bushido has made limited appearances in media outside comics, with his most prominent being non-speaking appearances in the animated series Teen Titans. Bushido also appears in the series' spin-off comic series Teen Titans Go!.

== Publication history ==
Bushido first appeared in Titans Annual #1 (2000), part of the "Planet DC" event, and was created by Geoff Johns and Ben Raab.

Bushido's death in Infinite Crisis underwent several revisions. Initially, writer Geoff Johns intended Argent to die, but editor Eddie Berganza objected to the idea, as he was fond of the character and had plans for her. Terra and Red Star were also considered to die before Baby Wildebeest, Pantha, and Bushido were chosen in their place. Johns reasoned that he would not mind killing Bushido, his own creation.

== Fictional character biography ==
Ryuko Orsono is a Japanese teenager who becomes a samurai upon his mother's death, being the latest in a long familial line of heroes. He first encountered the Teen Titans in Titans Annual #1, when they come to Japan in order to free their team member Beast Boy from the possession of the demon Tengu. Bushido uses his mystical sword to cut open Beast Boy's throat, which frees him from Tengu's possession without harming him.

In Titans Secret Files #2, Bushido joins the short lived Titans L.A. before its dissolution. During his time in the group, his teammates were Herald, Bumblebee, Hero Cruz, Terra, Flamebird, Captain Marvel Jr., and Beast Boy.

In Infinite Crisis, Bushido joins the Titans in battling Superboy-Prime outside Keystone City. He, Pantha, and Baby Wildebeest are killed by Prime in the battle.

In Blackest Night, Bushido is reanimated as a member of the Black Lantern Corps along with the other heroes killed by Superboy-Prime. Prime uses a black power ring to cycle through the emotional spectrum, creating a burst of colored energy that destroys the Black Lanterns.

== Powers and abilities ==
Bushido is skilled in the martial arts, especially in swordsmanship. His primary weapons are the naginata and the jitte, as well as the hachiwara and the shuriken. Each weapon is imbued with the soul of the warrior who wielded it, with Bushido being able to communicate with the spirits and receive guidance from them.

== In other media ==
- Bushido makes non-speaking appearances in Teen Titans as a member of the eponymous group.
- Bushido appears as a character summon in Scribblenauts Unmasked: A DC Comics Adventure.
- Bushido appears in Teen Titans Go!.
