= Pantha =

- Pantha as depicted in Who's Who in the DC Universe #14 (November 1991); art by Tom Grummett.

Publication information
- Publisher: DC Comics
- First appearance: New Titans #73 (February 1991)
- Created by: Marv Wolfman (writer); Tom Grummett (artist)

In-story information
- Alter ego: Rosabelle Mendez
- Species: Metahuman
- Team affiliations: Teen Titans; Justice League; Black Lantern Corps
- Notable aliases: X-24
- Abilities: Enhanced strength, agility, and vision; Powerful claws

Pantha (Rosabelle Mendez) is a fictional character appearing in American comic books published by DC Comics. She is a member of the Teen Titans who gained cat-like abilities from experimentation by the Wildebeest Society. Pantha was killed by Superboy-Prime during the Infinite Crisis event in 2006 and made limited appearances afterwards before being resurrected following The New 52 and DC Rebirth relaunches.

Diane Delano voices Pantha in the animated series Teen Titans, where she is depicted as a human wrestler and honorary member of the Titans.

== Publication history ==
Pantha first appeared in New Titans #73 (February 1991) and was created by Marv Wolfman and Tom Grummett.

Pantha was conceived as an "anti-member" of the Titans, being morally ambiguous and bitter. According to editor Jonathan Peterson, Pantha was intended to have once been a human before being altered by the Wildebeest Society. Peterson had plans for a story where she was returned to her original form, only to become Pantha again by the story's end.

Pantha's death in Infinite Crisis underwent several revisions. Initially, writer Geoff Johns intended Argent to die, but editor Eddie Berganza objected to the idea, as he was fond of the character and had plans for her. Terra and Red Star were also considered to die before Baby Wildebeest, Pantha, and Bushido were chosen in their place.

== Fictional character biography ==
Pantha is a member of the Teen Titans who possesses a cat-like appearance and abilities. During her time with the Titans, she has no knowledge as to her origins and does not know whether she was a human or a panther before the Wildebeest Society mutated her. She attempts to seek answers, but never learns the truth of her origins.

Pantha unwillingly adopts Baby Wildebeest, a fellow creation of the Wildebeest Society who considers her his mother. While initially hostile towards the child, Pantha grows to care for him. She later takes custody of Baby Wildebeest and moves to Russia with him and Red Star.

Pantha returns to the Titans when Cyborg, now with an entirely new level of power, threatens Earth. The Justice League come into conflict with the Titans due a misunderstanding. Pantha takes on Catwoman, but neither win the battle as they are attacked by Orion.

During the 2005 event "Infinite Crisis", Pantha joins the Teen Titans, the Doom Patrol, and the Justice Society of America in battling Superboy-Prime outside Keystone City. Superboy-Prime kills Pantha and Baby Wildebeest, with Red Star surviving the battle and being left to mourn his family.

In the 2009 event Blackest Night, Pantha is resurrected as a member of the Black Lantern Corps and attacks the Teen Titans. However, Dawn Granger destroys her body with a burst of light.

Pantha returns in the 2023 series Tales of the Titans, where she is depicted as a former member of the Teen Titans who left for a maternity leave. She is later shown to have joined the Justice League.

== Powers and abilities ==
Pantha possesses retractable claws and superhuman physical abilities derived from her cat-like physiology, including enhanced strength, speed, agility, and senses.

== Other versions ==
- In an alternate timeline created by Booster Gold when he saved Ted Kord from being killed by Maxwell Lord, Pantha is a member of Green Arrow and Hawkman's Freedom Fighters. It is later revealed that Pantha was a vet student at New York University named Rosabelle Mendez who was captured by Lord, transformed into Pantha, and sold to the Wildebeest Society. This timeline is erased when Kord returns to the past to face his fate.
- In Amalgam Comics, Pantha is combined with Marvel Comics character Feral, forming Panthera.

== In other media ==
- Pantha appears in Teen Titans, voiced by Diane Delano. This version is a human wrestler, luchador, and honorary member of the Teen Titans.
- Pantha appears in Teen Titans Go!.
- Pantha appears as a character summon in Scribblenauts Unmasked: A DC Comics Adventure.
