= Brother Blood =

DC Comics supervillain

- Brother Blood as depicted in The New Teen Titans #22 (August 1982). Art by George Pérez.

Publication information
- Publisher: DC Comics
- First appearance: Sebastian Blood VIII: The New Teen Titans #21 (July 1982); Sebastian Blood IX: Outsiders #6 (January 2004)
- Created by: Sebastian Blood VIII: Marv Wolfman; George Pérez; Sebastian Blood IX: Judd Winick; ChrisCross

In-story information
- Alter ego: Sebastian Blood
- Team affiliations: Both: Church of Blood; Sebastian Blood IX: Secret Society of Super Villains
- Abilities: Sebastian Blood VIII: Hypnosis; Sorcery; Longevity; Immunity to Raven's soul-self Sebastian Blood IX: Vampirism; Enhanced strength Adept hand-to-hand combatant

Sebastian Blood VIII, known by his alias, Brother Blood, is a supervillain appearing in American comic books published by DC Comics. He is a power-hungry priest and head of the Church of Blood, as well as the eighth person in the DC Universe to assume the mantle, after killing his father and taking the Brother Blood mantle from him. This tradition had gone on for generations, dating back to the 13th century, when the first Brother Blood was born after obtaining Jesus of Nazareth's prayer shawl and gaining superhuman abilities. As Brother Blood, Sebastian served as a recurring adversary of the Teen Titans before being killed by his successor, Sebastian Blood IX.

Brother Blood appears in the 2003 Teen Titans animated series and its 2013 spin-off Teen Titans Go!, voiced by John DiMaggio. Sebastian Blood is a recurring character in the second season of the Arrowverse series Arrow, portrayed by Kevin Alejandro. Joseph Morgan appears as the character in the fourth season of the HBO Max series Titans.

== Publication history ==
The first Brother Blood, Sebastian Blood VIII, debuted in The New Teen Titans #21 (July 1982), and was created by writer Marv Wolfman and artist George Pérez. He was a regular foe of the Teen Titans for many years. Based on Wolfman's interest in occult manipulation from his previous work on Marvel's Tomb of Dracula, Brother Blood's "very dark" storyline received praise from older readers but alienated younger readers of the title.

Wolfman: "When I was at Marvel, I wrote a horror book called Tomb of Dracula ... By its nature, ToD dealt with supreme evil and its control over people, including those in demonic and dark religious cults. I wanted to further explore this concept, this time in the guise of the superhero book, yet I wanted to go just as dark and just as twisted as before."

The second Brother Blood, Sebastian Blood IX, debuted in Outsiders (vol. 3) #6 (January 2004), and was created by writer Judd Winick and artist ChrisCross.

== Fictional character biography ==
=== Sebastian Blood VIII ===
The first Brother Blood encountered by the Titans is the eighth to bear the title. Seven hundred years earlier, a priest in the fictional nation of Zandia named Brother Sebastian killed another priest to gain possession of what he believed to be Jesus Christ's prayer shawl. The shawl gave Sebastian invulnerability and reduced his aging, but the priest he killed cursed him to be slain by his son before his hundredth birthday. Upon doing so, his son became the second Brother Blood. He, in turn was killed by his son, and this continued for seven centuries.

The eighth Brother Blood intends to extend the Church of Blood beyond Zandia and make the organization to be a world power. The Church of Blood begins operating in America, and the Titans are called to investigate when an ex-girlfriend of Cyborg attempts to escape the cult. Because of the Church of Blood's influence, the Titans find moving against him difficult, especially when public opinion is turned against them by Bethany Snow, a reporter who is also a member of the Church.

Brother Blood brainwashes Nightwing and attempts to take control of Raven's power. Raven defeats Blood and his mind is seemingly destroyed. Blood's wife Mother Mayhem later gives birth to a girl, suggesting the curse to have ended.

=== Sebastian Blood IX ===
The second Brother Blood, art by Tony Daniel.

Some time later, in Outsiders vol. 3, Brother Blood returns to villainy. Shortly after recreating his cult, he is killed by a young boy, Sebastian, claiming to be the new Brother Blood. This version reappeared in Teen Titans vol. 3.

This teenaged Brother Blood seemingly bases all his decisions on advice from Mother Mayhem, a female cultist who is chosen at random and killed if the advice is not what Blood wants to hear. The Cult of Blood is based on the worship of Trigon, with Blood intending for his bride to be Trigon's daughter Raven. The Titans are able to save Raven, but the Church of Blood continues.

Brother Blood later appears during the "Infinite Crisis" storyline as a member of Alexander Luthor Jr.'s Secret Society of Super Villains, where he claims an undead Lilith Clay to be his mother. He also resurrects long-dead Titans members Hawk and Dove, Danny Chase, Kole, and Aquagirl to serve him. Blood is stopped by Kid Eternity and sent to the eighth level of Hell.

In the aftermath of the "Reign in Hell" miniseries, Blood, now an adult, escapes Hell and battles the Titans at Titans Tower. After draining Red Devil's powers, Blood realizes that he has tainted himself with Neron's influence and flees. He is later seen approaching an unknown woman, looking to make her his new mother.

=== The New 52 ===
In September 2011, The New 52 rebooted DC's continuity. In this new timeline, the Cult of Blood (once again as Trigon's pawns) makes their debut in Phantom Stranger. Brother Blood himself appears in Ravagers. Blood kidnaps the team intending to use Beast Boy's powers in a ritual to access the Red, a cosmic force that connects all animal life. The Ravagers interrupt the ritual as Terra buries Blood alive. Blood survives and returns in Animal Man, where it is revealed his obsession with the Red came from being their first option for champion before Buddy Baker was chosen.

=== Mother Blood ===
A new incarnation of Brother Blood is introduced in DC Rebirth. This version is Sonya Tarinka, a former leader of the Cult of Blood who has a deep connection to the Red and can control the minds of others.

== Powers and abilities ==
The first Blood is a formidable opponent who is backed by a massive number of fanatical followers. He is an expert manipulator who feeds off of the faith of his members coupled with a capable staff that can see through disguises to detect infiltrators and assist in public relations. He ages at a much slower rate than normal humans. Brother Blood is immune to Raven's soul-self due to his shawl's powers. He is also nigh-invulnerable and has supernatural physical strength.

The second Blood's powers work in a manner similar to those of a vampire: he gains strength from blood, and can take on the abilities of anyone whose blood he has sampled. Like the first Blood, he is backed by a massive number of fanatical followers. In The New 52 continuity, Blood possesses psionic mind-control abilities.

== In other media ==
=== Television ===
Brother Blood as he appears in Teen Titans (2003).

- Brother Blood appears in Teen Titans (2003), voiced by John DiMaggio. This version is a cyborg with psychic powers and the headmaster of the H.I.V.E. Academy. In comparison to the Teen Titans' previous enemy Slade, series producer and writer David Slack stated that Blood is his opposite, seeking attention rather than hiding from it. Furthermore, Blood draws inspiration from real-life cult leaders and deviates from his comics counterpart because the original's backstory was considered difficult to adapt.
- Brother Sebastian Blood appears in the second season of Arrow, portrayed by Kevin Alejandro. This version was born in the crime-infested Starling City district of the Glades and raised by an abusive, alcoholic father named Sebastian Sangre and a submissive mother named Maya Resik. As of the present, Blood moonlights as a politician and friend of Oliver Queen while working to rebuild the Glades. In secret, he operates as the leader of the Church of Blood, which he inherited from its founder Roger Trigon. Through the cult, he kidnaps criminals and injects them with the Mirakuru serum in an attempt to replicate the process that empowered his ally and secret backer Slade Wilson, with cultist Cyrus Gold becoming Blood's first successful test subject. Following the death of his campaign rival Moira Queen and learning Slade intends to completely destroy Starling City, leaving nothing to rebuild from, Blood attempts to betray him by giving Queen vital information and Mirakuru samples in exchange for leniency, only to be killed by Slade's ally Isabel Rochev.
- Brother Blood appears in Teen Titans Go!, voiced again by John DiMaggio.
- Brother Blood appears in the fourth season of Titans, portrayed by Joseph Morgan. This version is Sebastian Sanger, the son of Trigon and Mother Mayhem and half-brother of Rachel Roth who was orphaned by his parents and became a Metropolis taxidermist. After seeing hallucinations of blood and hearing chanting, Sebastian becomes the leader of the Church of Blood to seek Trigon's power for himself.

=== Film ===
Brother Blood appears in Teen Titans: The Judas Contract, voiced by Gregg Henry. This version is the leader of an unnamed cult that seeks divine dominion over mankind; claims to be centuries-old, attributing his long lifespan to his practice of bathing in his enemies' blood; and is served by Mother Mayhem as an aide. He tasks Deathstroke and Terra with kidnapping the Teen Titans so he can use their blood to become a god-like being. However, Nightwing and Terra thwart Blood's plot before Raven depowers him and Mayhem kills him to prevent him from being imprisoned.

=== Video games ===
- Brother Blood appears as a boss in Teen Titans (2005), voiced again by John DiMaggio.
- Brother Blood appears in DC Universe Online, voiced by Ev Lunning.
- Brother Blood appears as a character summon in Scribblenauts Unmasked: A DC Comics Adventure.

=== Miscellaneous ===
- Brother Blood appears in Smallville Season 11: Harbinger.
- An original incarnation of Brother Blood appears in the Arrow tie-in comic Arrow: Season 2.5. Following Sebastian Blood's death, devout theologian Clinton Hogue takes up the mantle of Brother Blood and leadership of the Church of Blood. Using his ties to the mercenary group, the Renegades, he takes Felicity Smoak hostage, but Oliver Queen saves her while Roy Harper kicks Hogue out of a window, sending him falling to his death.
- The Arrow incarnation of Brother Sebastian Blood appears in the tie-in novel Arrow: Vengeance, which explores and expands on his backstory. As a result of his father Sebastian Sangre's abuse, Blood suffered skull-related nightmares. Amidst these, he befriended teenager Cyrus Gold and the latter's mentor Roger Trigon, who killed Sangre after he threatened to kill Blood. Blood's mother Maya Resik was framed for Sangre's death, arrested, and placed in a psychiatric institution while Blood was placed in an orphanage. After creating a skull mask to conquer his fears, Blood formally joined the Church of Blood as Brother Blood, vowing to protect the citizens of Starling City and Zandia no matter the cost. Sometime later, he met Slade Wilson, who offered to help him become mayor of Starling City.
- Brother Blood appears in the intercompany crossover DC x Sonic the Hedgehog.
