= Danny Chase =

Phantasm

Publication information
- Publisher: DC Comics
- First appearance: New Teen Titans Annual (vol. 2) #3 (November 1987)
- Created by: Marv Wolfman; Mike Collins

In-story information
- Alter ego: Daniel M. Chase, later the souls of Azarath
- Species: Human (originally); Fusion of Souls (currently)
- Team affiliations: New Teen Titans; Central Bureau of Intelligence
- Abilities: Telekinesis; Extremely intelligent with a photographic memory

Danny Chase (later called Phantasm) is a superhero appearing in media published by DC Comics, primarily in association with the Teen Titans.

== Publication history ==
Danny Chase/Phantasm first appeared in The New Teen Titans Annual (vol. 2) #3 and was created by Marv Wolfman and artist Mike Collins. Although Wolfman hoped the character would restore the "teen hero" feel to a group composed mostly of young adults, Chase was also intended as a comic foil for one of the group's primary characters, Changeling.

The character was often portrayed as an overly snide, egotistical brat. Conflicts with Beast Boy were one-sided, with Chase invariably delivering come-uppance. Meanwhile, other members of the team proved prone to commenting on how impressed they were by Chase's cleverness and capability. This quickly proved unpopular with fans. Wolfman tried various ways to make Chase more appealing, including having him become Phantasm during the Titans Hunt storyline. However, reception to the character continued to be negative, leading him to be killed off.

During Jay Faerber's run on Titans, he planned for the newly introduced villain Epsilon to be Danny Chase, resurrected by Tempest's evil uncle Slizzath. Editor Andrew Helfer overturned this, making Epsilon and Chase unrelated.

== Fictional character biography ==
Danny Chase is a short-lived member of the New Teen Titans. He is raised by parents who are international spies for the Central Bureau of Intelligence under King Faraday. As a result, he is extensively trained in espionage, infiltration, and intelligence acquisition. Failing to persuade Faraday to look into his parents' abduction by Godiva, Danny turns to the Titans and Nightwing. After proving his worth as a metahuman with powerful telekinetic abilities and a near-photographic memory, he joins the group. Following the death of Jason Todd, Nightwing orders Danny to leave the Titans for his own safety.

During the Titans Hunt storyline, Danny Chase is confronted by two members of the Wildebeest Society inside a shopping mall. One of them blasts him away and assumes him to be dead. Danny survives and assembles a disguise from assorted items - a hockey mask, a bolt of fabric, and a modulator to alter his voice. He presents himself as the "Phantasm" to remain incognito.

Danny later sacrifices himself to save Raven's homeworld of Azarath, with his spirit fusing with Arella and the souls of Azarath and becoming a new entity called Phantasm. Following his death, Danny's body is resurrected on two occasions, acting as a separate entity from Phantasm. He appears as an undead slave to Brother Blood in the third volume of Teen Titans (2006) and is resurrected as a Black Lantern during the Blackest Night event (2009). In Blackest Night, Danny's body is destroyed by Dawn Granger.

In The New 52 continuity reboot, Phantasm appears as a captive of A.R.G.U.S.

== Powers and abilities ==
Danny Chase is a metahuman who possesses telekinesis. In addition, he is additionally skilled in espionage and has a photographic memory. As Phantasm, he possesses the combined magic of the souls of Azarath.

== In other media ==
- Danny Chase appears in Young Justice, voiced by Jason Marsden. This version possesses teleportation in addition to telekinesis, both of which he gained from experimentation by the Light, and was further experimented on by DeSaad. DeSaad removed Danny's brain and contained it in a robotic box which became known as the Kaiser-Thrall. Danny is forced into serving the forces of Apokolips before being freed by the Team.
- Danny Chase appears as a character summon in Scribblenauts Unmasked: A DC Comics Adventure.
- Danny Chase appears in Injustice: Gods Among Us: Year Five #16.
