= Baby Wildebeest =

- Baby Wildebeest as depicted in Who's Who in the DC Universe #14 (November 1991). Art by Tom Grummett (penciller), Al Vey (inker), and Anthony Tollin (colorist).

Publication information
- Publisher: DC Comics
- First appearance: New Titans #85 (April 1992)
- Created by: Marv Wolfman; Tom Grummett

In-story information
- Species: Metahuman
- Place of origin: Earth
- Team affiliations: New Teen Titans; Wildebeest Society; Black Lantern Corps
- Abilities: Superhuman strength, durability, and stamina Size alteration

Baby Wildebeest is a fictional character appearing in American comic books published by DC Comics. He is a member of the Teen Titans who is themed after his namesake and possesses superhuman strength and durability. His default form is that of a small anthropomorphic wildebeest, but he is capable of transforming into a larger form. Baby Wildebeest was killed by Superboy-Prime during the 2005 event Infinite Crisis and has made limited appearances since.

Elements of Baby Wildebeest are incorporated into the version of Wildebeest who appears in Teen Titans (2003), voiced by Dee Bradley Baker. He is depicted as a human child who can transform into a wildebeest hybrid.

== Publication history ==
Baby Wildebeest first appeared in New Teen Titans vol. 2 #85 (April 1992), and was created by Marv Wolfman and Tom Grummett.

In a 2001 interview with Bill Walko, editor Jonathan Peterson stated that Baby Wildebeest and the Wildebeest Society were conceptualized via reverse engineering after it was decided that Jericho would be the group's leader. Peterson intended Baby Wildebeest to be the New Titans' "super strength guy", possessing immense strength but low intelligence due to being an infant.

Baby Wildebeest's death in Infinite Crisis underwent several revisions. Initially, writer Geoff Johns intended Argent to die, but editor Eddie Berganza objected to the idea, as he was fond of the character and had plans for her. Terra and Red Star were also considered to die before Baby Wildebeest, Pantha, and Bushido were chosen in their place.

== Fictional character biography ==
After being possessed by the spirits of Azarath, Jericho becomes the leader of the Wildebeest Society, which experiments with creating genetically-created host bodies for the spirits to possess. Baby Wildebeest is the Society's only successful experiment before the organization is dismantled by the Teen Titans. The Titans adopt Baby Wildebeest, who regards Pantha as his mother. Although the size of a human toddler, Baby Wildebeest possesses disproportionate strength. After the Team Titans threaten Pantha, he demonstrates the ability to gain adult form to protect her. Pantha originally does not like Wildebeest, often talking about various ways he could die. Her attitude softens as Wildebeest stays with the team.

After the New Titans disband, Pantha takes Baby Wildebeest with her. They and former Titan Red Star move in Science City in Russia, where Pantha and Red Star raise Baby Wildebeest as their son.

During the 2005 event Infinite Crisis, Baby Wildebeest and Pantha are among the Titans who confront Superboy-Prime outside Keystone City. They are both killed by Prime. Baby Wildebeest has remained dead since, but was temporarily resurrected as a Black Lantern in the Blackest Night crossover event.

== Powers and abilities ==
Baby Wildebeest possesses immense strength, stamina, and durability. When provoked, he becomes a twelve-foot powerhouse, strong enough to take blows from Superman.

== In other media ==
Elements of Baby Wildebeest are incorporated into Teen Titans' incarnation of Wildebeest.

== Reception ==
Writing for Comic Book Resources (CBR), Timothy Blake Donohoo stated that Baby Wildebeest's death was not as impactful as it could have been, since the character had not been prominently featured in any stories for years. Donohoo believed that Baby Wildebeest was killed off purely for shock value, serving as cannon fodder for Superboy-Prime. Donohoo also compared Baby Wildebeest's death to the apparent death of Beast Boy in Dark Crisis, stating that Beast Boy's death was more impactful due to him being a high-profile member of the Teen Titans.

Writing for Screen Rant, Samantha King stated that Baby Wildebeest had little depth as a character; being tied to the Teen Titans and the Wildebeest Society, the character had little potential for appearances outside the Teen Titans comics.

Writing for CBR, Paul DiSalvo stated that Baby Wildebeest's death was underwhelming, ranking the character sixth in his list of the ten most underwhelming superhero deaths. DiSalvo stated that Baby Wildebeest had the most underwhelming death of the heroes killed by Superboy-Prime, dying to a single blast of heat vision.
