= Red Star (comics) =

- Red Star from Teen Titans #38.

Publication information
- Publisher: DC Comics
- First appearance: Teen Titans #18 (December 1968)
- Created by: Len Wein (writer); Marv Wolfman (writer); Bill Draut (artist)

In-story information
- Alter ego: Leonid Konstantinovitch Kovar
- Species: Metahuman
- Team affiliations: Teen Titans; Justice League
- Notable aliases: Starfire
- Abilities: Superhuman strength, speed, and durability; Radiation generation and manipulation; Immunity to all types of radiation; Flight; Pyrokinesis; Heat generation

Red Star (Russian: Kрасная Звезда, romanized: Krasnaya Zvezda, Leonid Konstantinovitch Kovar), formerly named Starfire (Звездный Огонь, Zvezdnyy Ogon'), is a superhero in the DC Universe.

== Publication history ==
A former member of the Teen Titans, Red Star first appeared under the name Starfire in Teen Titans #18 (Dec. 1968) and was created by Len Wein, Marv Wolfman, and Bill Draut.

== Fictional character biography ==
While still a young teenager, Leonid Kovar and his father Konstantin (an archaeologist) investigate a spaceship that has crashed into the Yenisei River. During their investigation, the ship explodes, imbuing Leonid with energy and giving him superhuman strength, speed, and pyrokinesis. Being a Russian patriot who believes in communism, he offers his services to his country and becomes a superhero, taking the name Starfire.

Starfire does not reappear until The New Teen Titans #18 in 1982, where he is renamed Red Star to avoid confusion with the character Starfire (Koriand'r). He is one of the heroes who assemble to fight the Villain War in Crisis on Infinite Earths, although his political views cause friction with Hawk and Negative Woman, a Soviet defector.

In New Titans (1991), Red Star joins the Teen Titans. After two years, Red Star leaves the Titans with Pantha and Baby Wildebeest to form a family. They eventually move to the Soviet locale Science City.

Red Star is not seen again until the JLA/Titans miniseries in 1999. He makes minor appearances over the next few years and is featured in Infinite Crisis, in which he is frozen by Superboy-Prime after witnessing Prime kill Pantha and Baby Wildebeest.

He joins the Titans during the one year jump, but leaves the team for unknown reasons. He helps them in their search for Raven. Since his last appearance, he has stopped an alien invasion of Russia and been appointed State Protector.

Red Star joins the Titans during the one year jump, but leaves the team for unknown reasons. He helps them in their search for Raven. Since his last appearance he has stopped an invasion of Russia by the aliens from his origin, and been appointed State Protector. He is now based in a ship similar to the one that exploded, hovering over Moscow.

Red Star later greets Tim Drake, a former teammate of his during the one year jump, when he comes to Russia for a meeting with Viktor Mikalek, a business tycoon with suspected ties to the Society. When the meeting is interrupted by the vigilante Promise, Red Star intervenes and rescues Mikalek. After finding Tim in the midst of a discussion with Promise, Red Star mistakenly believes that they are working together, only for Tim to reveal Mikalek's dealings with the Society. Red Star claims that he is aware of Mikalek's criminal activities, and states that they are a necessary evil needed to rescue Russia's failing economy from total collapse. He attacks Tim, who breaks into Red Star's ship and discovers a stockpile of nuclear warheads. Following an adventure in the Undernet, a supervillain communications grid, Red Robin is allowed to leave.

During a battle between the Teen Titans and Superboy-Prime's Legion of Doom, Red Star and a group of other former Titans arrive to help turn the tide. He attacks Prime himself, blaming him for the death of his family. Red Star is quickly overpowered by Prime, but is rescued by the other Titans.

In Doomsday Clock, Red Star comes out of retirement to serve Russia as a member of the "People's Heroes" alongside other Soviet-themed metahumans, including Lady Flash of Blue Trinity and Pozhar.

== Powers and abilities ==
Red Star is empowered by unknown alien energies that altered his physical abilities and reflexes. Over time, these abilities have changed and he has developed from merely having augmented strength and speed to being equipped with an array of different powers. Red Star's abilities include superhuman strength, speed, invulnerability, and endurance. Red Star can also morph into a form that is composed of fire-like energy and enables him to form and redirect energy.

== Other versions ==
An alternate universe version of Red Star appears in Flashpoint. This version is a member of H.I.V.E.

== In other media ==
Red Star as he appears in Teen Titans

- Red Star appears in Teen Titans, voiced by Jason Marsden. This version is an honorary member of the Teen Titans who gained his powers from a secret government project and chose to live in an abandoned nuclear power plant due to lacking control over them.
- Red Star appears as a character summon in Scribblenauts Unmasked: A DC Comics Adventure.
- Red Star appears in Teen Titans Go!.
- Red Star appears in Justice League: Crisis on Infinite Earths.

== See also ==
- List of Russian superheroes
