= Superboy-Prime =

DC Comics character and DC comics fan

- Superboy-Prime as depicted in Infinite Crisis #5 (April 2006). Art by George Pérez

Publication information
- Publisher: DC Comics
- First appearance: DC Comics Presents #87 (November, 1985)
- Created by: Elliot S. Maggin; Curt Swan

In-story information
- Alter ego: Kal-El; Clark Kent; CK Prime
- Species: Kryptonian
- Place of origin: Earth Prime, born on Krypton of same universe
- Team affiliations: Superman Family; Sinestro Corps (former); Legion of Super-Villains (former); Legion of Doom (former)
- Notable aliases: Superman-Prime; Superman; Prime; Superboy; Time Trapper
- Abilities: See list: Vast knowledge of the DC Universe; Medium-awareness and interaction; Genius level intellect; Mechanical engineering; Shock Wave Projection; Vortex Creations; Interstellar Travel; Time Travel; Inter-dimensional travel; Immortality; Retcon Punch; Immense superhuman strength, speed, stamina, reflexes, agility, senses, and endurance; Solar energy radiation absorption; Enhanced vision; Telescopic vision; X-ray vision; Microscopic vision; Infrared vision; Electromagnetic spectrum vision; Heat vision; Wind and freeze breath; Invulnerability; Flight; Indomitable will; Self-sustenance by solar energy absorption; Skilled hand-to-hand combatant

Superboy-Prime (Clark Kent; colloquial: "Prime"; later CK Prime) is a supervillain-turned-superhero appearing in American comic books published by DC Comics. A boy from the real world transported to the DC Universe, as an alternate version of Superboy, the character first appeared in DC Comics Presents #87 (November 1985) as part of the multiversal crossover event Crisis on Infinite Earths, and was created by Elliot S. Maggin and Curt Swan.

Superboy-Prime originates from the parallel Earth called Earth-Prime (representing the real world) in which superhumans like Superman and other comic superheroes only existed as fictional characters. Shortly before Earth Prime was drawn into Crisis on Infinite Earths (April 1985–March 1986), 15-year-old DC fanboy Clark Kent developed real Kryptonian powers and assumed the identity of Superboy. After the Crisis destroyed his world, he was one of the few characters to survive without being folded into the new Post-Crisis timeline, and withdrew with other survivors into a "paradise dimension" from which he was able to observe the new timeline and the new living versions of fictional characters he had read about as a child.

Superboy-Prime was brought back in Geoff Johns' Infinite Crisis (December 2005–June 2006) as an allegory of toxic fandom. Here Superboy-Prime was shown to have gradually become angry at the failure of the new versions of his heroes to live up to his idealized memories of them. He escaped his paradise dimension intending to fix reality but soon turned violent, murdering Conner Kent and several other heroes. In Countdown to Final Crisis (May 2007–April 2008) he entirely destroyed multiple worlds across the multiverse for failing to meet his expectations of them. He Joined the Sinestro Corps in Sinestro Corps War (June – December 2007) and was for a time afterwards imprisoned by the Guardians of Oa. A redemption arc later played out in Dark Nights: Death Metal (June 2020–January 2021), in which he battled the Batman Who Laughs to save the multiverse and was rewarded with being able to return to his home reality, forgiven for his crimes and welcomed with open arms.

Superboy-Prime returned in the sixth volume of Superman, where he is revealed to have actually been transported to a pocket universe created by the Time Trapper rather than a restored Earth-Prime and is recruited by Superman to battle the Legion of Super-Heroes of the Absolute Universe.

The name "Superman-Prime" was first used by Grant Morrison in DC One Million (1998) for the mainstream Superman in the 853rd century (he is essentially the same Superman from the All-Star Superman storyline). Earth-Prime's Superboy first refers to himself as "Superboy-Prime" in Infinite Crisis #2 (January 2006).

== Fictional character biography ==
=== Crisis on Infinite Earths ===
Superboy-Prime's first appearance, in DC Comics Presents #87 (1985). Art by Eduardo Barreto.

Superboy-Prime is from Earth-Prime, an analogue for the "real world" where DC heroes are fictional comic book characters. He is the adopted son of Jerry and Naomi Kent. Naomi wanted to name him Clark, after her maiden name, but Jerry, knowing he will also be named like Superman, a fictional comic book character, initially refused, but finally gave in. What the Kents do not know is that the baby is a multiversal version of the fictional Clark Kent / Kal-El, who was teleported to Earth by his father Jor-El moments before the planet Krypton was destroyed.

Young Clark lives the first fifteen years of his life as a normal boy before Halley's Comet passes by Earth, awakening his Kryptonian powers. At the same time, the Earth-One Superman finds his way to Earth-Prime and the two Supermen meet. Superboy-Prime uses his powers to stop a tidal wave.

During Crisis on Infinite Earths, Superboy-Prime helps fight the Anti-Monitor after he destroys Earth-Prime. After the Anti-Monitor is killed, Superboy-Prime joins Alexander Luthor Jr. of Earth-Three, Kal-L, and his wife Lois Lane in a "paradise dimension". In that dimension, Superboy-Prime secludes himself from the others, using crystals to replay events from his life on Earth-Prime. Luthor later shows him the deaths of his parents and girlfriend in a car accident on the post-Crisis Earth.

=== Infinite Crisis ===
Superboy-Prime in his Anti-Monitor inspired armor. Cover to Infinite Crisis #6 (2006)

Furious, Superboy-Prime pounds on the barrier of reality. This assault causes ripples that overlap parallel timelines (Hypertime), which was used as an explanation for character changes, errors, and retcons in DC continuity.

Eventually, Alexander reveals to Superboy-Prime that his powers are returning, and the two combine forces to break through the barrier wall. Together, they set into motion the events that culminate in Infinite Crisis. The Superman of Earth-Two breaks open a portal to the DC Universe, and the four residents of the paradise dimension return, making themselves known to Power Girl and Batman. Superboy-Prime is jealous of Conner Kent, the modern Superboy, believing him to be living the life he himself ought to have had while not fighting for it. He also believes the Earth's heroes act more like villains. Superboy-Prime confronts Superboy, telling him that he (Superboy-Prime) is the only Superboy the Earth needs. Superboy-Prime attacks Conner, but not before Conner activates his Titans homing signal. The Teen Titans, the Doom Patrol, and the Justice Society of America arrive to help Conner, during which Superboy-Prime kills Titans members Baby Wildebeest, Pantha, and Bushido. Jay Garrick, Wally West, and Bart Allen banish Superboy-Prime to a parallel world and imprison him in a facility with artificial red sunlight, where he remains for four years.

Hours later, an older Bart Allen, dressed in his grandfather's costume, emerges from the Speed Force and tells the heroine Doctor Light to warn the other heroes that Superboy-Prime has escaped. During a battle between Alexander Luthor and the heroes freed from his tower, Superboy-Prime appears, wearing a power suit modeled after the Anti-Monitor's armor, which constantly feeds him yellow solar energy and boosts his power levels. During the battle, Black Adam discovers that magic has little effect against Superboy-Prime. Superboy-Prime knocks Adam away from the tower, and his opponent is transported to Earth-S. Superboy-Prime insists that Luthor reinstate Earth Prime as the only existing Earth. After Superboy-Prime attempts to kill Wonder Girl (Cassie Sandsmark), an enraged Conner Kent attacks him. Conner and Superboy-Prime's battle sends them both headlong into Alexander Luthor's vibrational tuning fork with the effects causing the machine to explode and fuse the alternate Earths into one. Conner dies from injuries sustained during the explosion, leaving the rest of the superheroes devastated.

Alexander and Superboy-Prime join the Battle of Metropolis and quarrel about their contingency plan. Since their tower has been destroyed, Alexander is prepared to settle for taking over New Earth instead of creating a perfect Earth. Upon hearing of the new plan, Superboy-Prime refuses to help him, as he believes New Earth to be hopelessly inferior.

When Batman, Wonder Woman, Kal-El, and Kal-L arrive to save Metropolis, Kal-L confronts Alex about his role in the destruction. Meanwhile, Superboy-Prime is attacked by Bart Allen, who has been left outraged by Conner's death. Superboy-Prime escapes Bart and flies toward the planet Oa, intending to destroy it and spark another Big Bang which would recreate the universe with himself as the sole hero. Although the majority of the Earth's heroes are in pursuit, Superboy-Prime eludes capture.

Superboy-Prime is slowed down by a wall of pure willpower generated by the Green Lantern Corps. Breaking through, he battles 32 Green Lanterns, killing them. The two Supermen arrive and fly Superboy-Prime through Rao, the red sun of Krypton. The heat melts away Superboy-Prime's armor and severely weakens all three Kryptonians, who then crash on Mogo. Superboy-Prime beats Kal-L to death, but is then attacked by Kal-El. Superboy-Prime claims that he is better than Kal-El and that his Krypton was superior to Kal-El's. Kal-El responds, "It's not about where you were born. Or what powers you have. Or what you wear on your chest. It's about what you do... It's about action." Although nearly powerless, Kal-El knocks Superboy-Prime out before collapsing himself, but members of the Green Lantern Corps manage to save Kal-El.

Superboy-Prime is taken into the custody of the Guardians of the Universe, who place him in a quantum containment field, surrounded by a red Sun-Eater and guarded by 50 Green Lanterns. While inside his cell, he carves the Superman symbol into his chest, vowing to escape.

=== Sinestro Corps ===
A year later, Superboy-Prime sits naked in his cell and is watched over by a special cadre of Green Lanterns, including Guy Gardner, when the Guardians of the Universe discuss whether they should question him.

When the Sinestro Corps attack Oa, Superboy-Prime is released from his imprisonment and joins them. He becomes one of the Anti-Monitor's heralds, and he wears the uniform of the Sinestro Corps along with a version of the power suit he wore during Infinite Crisis. Calling himself Superman-Prime (in part due to the legal disputes over the Superboy name, and accordingly suddenly drawn to look more adult), he arrives on Earth and battles a large group of heroes while flashing back on his life so far. He reveals that he did not believe Sinestro when he said that the multiverse has been restored, and has only gone along with the Anti-Monitor's plans so that he may one day get revenge on him for the destruction of Earth Prime. Superman, Power Girl, and Supergirl arrive and stop him, only to have him escape as the sun rises, restoring his powers. Afterwards, Superman-Prime brutally battles Ion (Sodam Yat) throughout the state of New York. Superman-Prime gets the upper hand over Yat by exposing him to lead, and defeats him. When the Anti-Monitor is wounded by the Guardians and the destruction of War World, Superman-Prime impatiently flies through his chest and throws him into space, then battles both the Sinestro Corps and Green Lantern Corps, until a Guardian willingly sacrifices himself to destroy Superman-Prime. Instead of dying, Prime is infused with Oan energy and warped back into the multiverse.

=== Countdown to Final Crisis ===
Superman-Prime on the cover of Countdown to Final Crisis #14. Art by Pete Woods.

In Countdown to Final Crisis, following the conclusion of the Sinestro Corps War, Superman-Prime is shown wearing a costume similar to the black suit worn by Superman shortly after his resurrection and has discovered the existence of the new Multiverse, traversing it in the hopes of finding Earth Prime. He arrives on Earth-15 and attacks that world's Lex Luthor, blaming him for Alexander Luthor's failure to make the universe "perfect". He promptly kills that world's heroes and destroys the planet.

He then flies to his new base of operations in the Source Wall where he had been torturing Mister Mxyzptlk into helping him recreate Earth Prime. It is revealed that Superman-Prime is 19 years old. According to Mxyzptlk, his growth is the temporary side effect of his cells absorbing vast Oan energy from his last "encounter". Mxyzptlk escapes with the help of Annataz Arataz, an alternate version of Zatanna from Earth-3. Annataz is killed when Superman-Prime grows angry and gives up on using magic to achieve his goals.

He appears on the Monitors' satellite headquarters and threatens Solomon to help him find Earth Prime. Solomon tells him that if he releases Forerunner, he will show Prime what he wants; Prime does so. Solomon then tells Prime that Earth-51 is his perfect Earth, and it is in ruins due to the fighting between Monarch's Army, the Earth-51 heroes, and the Challengers. Prime leaves the satellite, intending to confront Monarch. Superman-Prime fights with Monarch, finding out that this is an enemy who is on his level despite his boosted powers from the Guardian. The two seem evenly matched until Prime becomes slightly injured after Monarch exposes part of his suit and releases some of his massive contained energies. In a fit of rage, Superman-Prime redoubles his attack on Monarch and rips open the chestplate of Monarch's containment armor, causing an explosion of quantum energy that seems to destroy the entire universe of Earth-51.

=== Legion of 3 Worlds ===
Superboy-Prime as the Time Trapper from Final Crisis: Legion of 3 Worlds #4. Art by George Pérez.

Shortly after the events of Superman and the Legion of Super-Heroes, the Time Trapper finds Superboy-Prime lost in time. He decides to use him to destroy the Legion and sends him to the 31st century, where he crashes in a farm outside of Smallville.

He appears much younger than he did when he was last seen in Countdown to Final Crisis, having used up the power he had absorbed from the dying Guardian. He encounters the elderly couple who own the farm, and they refer to him as Superboy, which enrages him. After being shot, he kills the farming couple, makes his way into Smallville, and visits the Superman Museum, where he discovers that he is regarded as merely a footnote in Superman's history. This sends him into a tantrum, in which he wrecks the museum and kills security guards and police officers. In the middle of his tantrum, the museum tour guide (a holographic recreation of Jimmy Olsen) tells Prime of the Legion of Super-Villains (LSV).

He learns that the evil Legion followed a code of evil, inspired by a dark being whose "name was never spoken". Prime, resolved to be a villain with more of an impact than any other enemy of Superman, frees LSV members Lightning Lord, Saturn Queen, and Cosmic King from the prison Takron-Galtos. Unlike most denizens of the 31st century, they all recognize Prime and seem overjoyed to see him. It is implied that Prime is the dark being whose example the villains follow.

After freeing the prisoners, Prime burns a huge S shield into the prison planet, determined to turn the shield from a symbol of hope into a symbol of terror. Learning of the prison break, the Legion of Super-Heroes call Superman from the 21st century. Superman, and the historical records, implies that no one from New Earth is aware of what happened to Prime after the Sinestro Corps War. Superman and Brainiac 5 decide to bring in two other versions of the Legion to combat Prime and the new Legion of Super-Villains, with Superman convinced the only way to neutralize the threat of Prime is to redeem him. Meanwhile, Superboy-Prime leads the Legion of Super-Villains to Zerox, where he recruits Mordru and kills Rond Vidar (the last Green Lantern) before heading to Earth.

During the war between the Legions of Super-Heroes and the Legion of Super-Villains, Prime battles several opponents with whom he has a history. First, the immortal Sodam Yat (the last Guardian of the Universe) is persuaded to end his self-imposed retirement on Oa to battle Superboy-Prime. Bart Allen returns from the Speed Force, wearing the Kid Flash uniform that he had not worn since fighting Prime in Infinite Crisis. Soon after, Conner Kent enters the battle, having been resurrected by Starman using a Kryptonian restoration chamber. The resurrections of Kid Flash and Superboy are part of a contingency plan devised long before by Brainiac 5, who was forewarned of Superboy-Prime by one of Dream Girl's prophecies.

During the battle, Superman, Lightning Lad, Cosmic Boy, and Saturn Girl are brought to the end of time by the Time Trapper, Superboy-Prime's future self. The Time Trapper states that he became an anomaly that could not be killed after being shunted into the multiverse by the Guardians of the Universe and became the sole survivor of all creation.

Conner creates a deep wound across Superboy-Prime's chest, which also appears on Time Trapper's chest. Realizing that Time Trapper's past is directly connected to his future, Saturn Girl has the Time Trapper summon versions of the Legion from across the multiverse, who fight and defeat the Time Trapper. Superboy-Prime attacks Time Trapper, creating a paradox that returns him to Earth-Prime. To his dismay, his girlfriend and family have read Infinite Crisis, Sinestro Corps War, Countdown to Final Crisis, and Legion of 3 Worlds, and are now terrified of him. Prime lives in his parents' basement, who support him out of fear for what he might do to them. He spends his days collecting comic books and trolling the DC Comics message boards, remarking that the DC universe will never be rid of him.

=== Blackest Night ===
The last scene of Superboy-Prime in Adventure Comics #5. Art by Jerry Ordway.

Superboy-Prime continues to live his secluded life, unknowingly but constantly monitored by the prime universe Brainiac 5, still compulsively reading every comic book and message board post pertaining to the DC multiverse. The extended cool-off period forced on him has left Clark more regretful, aware of his reputation as a joke character in the eyes of the people of Earth-Prime. Upon reading Adventure Comics #4 and the online solicitations for the storyline possibly dealing with his death, he embarks with his fearful parents on a wild goose chase, hoping to find a comic book store willing to sell him a copy of the fifth issue. However, since the fifth issue is not yet on the shelves, the events unfold as Clark already read them, with Alexander Luthor, multiversal-hopping Black Lantern, bestowing to him all of his powers in order to bring him to a higher emotional state. Upon calling forth Superboy's victims, he teasingly reveals to him his impending death in Adventure Comics #5. Unable to damage the Black Lanterns, Superboy-Prime flies to the DC Comics building in New York and attempts to take revenge on the writers he believes made him the way he is. Before he can do so, Alexander teleports him to his basement and begins destroying his comic collection.

Superboy-Prime accepts the hopelessness of his situation and willingly puts on a black ring, which wills him to "die". However, the ring, reacting to his mixed emotions, switches between the powers of the emotional spectrum, creating a burst of light that destroys the Black Lanterns and the ring itself. Lying on the floor, he becomes overcome by the emotions forced by the ring and devastated that "they" have turned him into a monster and made it so he cannot ever have a "happy ending". Laurie enters the basement, sporting a broken arm. She comforts Prime, telling him that "they" heard him, and that they sent her to tell him that they are sorry for what they did to him, and are going to leave him alone—"they" previously mentioned as being the writers at DC Comics. As they embrace, a Black Lantern ring is shown on Laurie's hand that detects the hope within Prime's heart.

=== Legion of Doom ===
During a battle with the Teen Titans, the villain Headcase accidentally transports Superboy-Prime to New Earth. Enraged by this, he vows to destroy the Teen Titans, forming a cadre of young supervillains consisting of Headcase, Zookeeper, Indigo, Sun Girl, Persuader (Elise Kimble), Inertia, and three clones of Superboy. However, he is defeated and sealed in the Source Wall.

=== Dark Knights: Death Metal ===
In Dark Nights: Death Metal, Superman, Batman and Wonder Woman encounter Superboy-Prime while fighting Perpetua. After petting Krypto and finally recognising there is nothing he can change about the nature of fiction, Superboy-Prime is convinced to reform and help battle Perpetua, during which he is transported to a restored Earth-Prime and presumed dead. Superboy-Prime returns to battle the Batman Who Laughs, deeming him to be everything wrong with modern DC Comics, before returning to Earth-Prime and being welcomed by his family.

=== DC All In ===
Superboy-Prime returns in the sixth volume of Superman, where he is revealed to have actually been transported to a pocket universe created by the Time Trapper rather than Earth-Prime. Superman and the Time Trapper enlist Superboy-Prime to battle the Legion of Super-Heroes of the Absolute Universe.

Following the events of DC K.O., Superman disappears and Superboy-Prime steps up to replace him, mentored by Lois Lane and gaining a new civilian identity, "CK", which he uses to get a job at a comic-book shop he used to frequent. The character's metafictional nature is highlighted; he addresses the reader and references events such as the death of Jonathan and Martha Kent, who have since been resurrected.

== Powers and abilities ==
=== Kryptonian powers ===
Fueled by yellow solar energy, Superboy-Prime has the standard suite of Kryptonian abilities, scaled to the reality-warping power levels of Pre-Crisis Kryptonians like Earth-One's Superman, and augmented by his unique ability to break the fourth wall.

=== Power suit ===
While imprisoned in the Speed Force, Superboy-Prime builds a power suit based on the one worn by the Anti-Monitor. The suit collects and feeds him yellow solar energy to maintain his power levels even when exposed to a red sun. The suit is destroyed when the two Supermen fly Superboy-Prime through Krypton's sun. After his escape from Oa, Superboy-Prime is given a new power suit built by the Sinestro Corps, which is destroyed during the assault on Earth. In Legion of 3 Worlds, Superboy-Prime dons his original armor once more, taking it from a statue in the Superman museum.

=== Weaknesses ===
Superboy-Prime is vulnerable to red sun radiation and unable to store solar energy, requiring constant exposure to it to maintain his powers. However, he is resistant to magic and immune to all forms of Kryptonite not from his universe.

== Personality ==
According to Infinite Crisis writer Geoff Johns, "Superboy-Prime's really frustrated with what his life has turned into and, unfortunately, that frustration is going to be taken out on the world". He also mentioned that "He's been wanting to show the world what he can do, because he barely had a chance to be Superboy. He was Superboy a little bit before Crisis on Infinite Earths and then—BOOM!—his world was wiped out and that was it".

After the publication of Infinite Crisis #5, Johns said at the Wizard World LA convention: "That took me a long time to break, because I thought Superboy-Prime needed to view the world so narrow. You can see how his world view is so narrow and so black and white and realistically that is not going to work anymore". Originally, Superboy-Prime started out coming into Crisis as corrupted and evil, but the take on the character did not work for Johns. "I said to Dan I think Prime does it by accident and is horrified. That panel where's he is looking at his hands and goes 'I didn't mean to do it', that for me is the entire story for Superboy-Prime. He didn't mean to do this stuff. What is worse... making a mistake and fessing up to it or doing something bad and saying 'You made me do it?'. Superboy-Prime is a very simplistic character who has become very complex".

When asked if Superboy-Prime was irredeemable or not, Johns replied "I think it's a split. You saw his reaction when he did what he did in Infinite Crisis, but at that same time, he's walked over that line. Does he think he can walk back? Should he? Does this universe even matter to him anymore? Is it the fact that now that he's got a big dent on his car, another one won't matter? If he's already on that path, is he going to continue on it, or is he going to really try and work and go back?"

== Other versions ==
=== Superman: Secret Identity ===
The 2004 limited series Superman: Secret Identity, described by its author as a reinvention of Superboy-Prime, describes the life of Clark Kent, a man named after the fictional superhero Superman, who suddenly develops the powers of Superman and embarks on a super-heroic career.

=== Tales from the Dark Multiverse ===
An alternate universe version of Superboy-Prime appears in Dark Multiverse: Infinite Crisis. This version was transformed into an enforcer for OMAC.

== In other media ==
- Superboy-Prime appears as a character summon in Scribblenauts Unmasked: A DC Comics Adventure.
- Superboy-Prime appears in DC Legends.
- Superboy-Prime appears in the webseries Death Battle, voiced by Sean Chiplock, wherein he fought Marvel Comics character The Sentry.

== See also ==
- List of Superman enemies
- Alternate versions of Superman
- Multiverse (DC Comics)
