= Teen Titans =

DC Comics superheroes

- Cover for Titans #1 (May 2023), art by Nicola Scott

Publication information
- Publisher: DC Comics
- First appearance: The Brave and the Bold #54 (July 1964)
- Created by: Bob Haney; Bruno Premiani

In-story information
- Base(s): Titans Tower: New York City (1980–1991, 1999–present); Other: Solar Tower, Metropolis (1997–1998); USS Argus, Earth orbit (1994–1995); Titans Liberty Island Base, New Jersey (1991–1994); Gabriel's Horn, Farmingdale, Long Island (1976); Titans' Lair, Gotham City (1966–1976); San Francisco (2016–present)
- Leader(s): Nightwing
- Member(s): Arsenal (Roy Harper); Beast Boy; Cyborg; Donna Troy; Nightwing; Raven; Starfire; Tempest; Flash (Wally West)

Roster

The Teen Titans are a superhero team appearing in American comic books published by DC Comics, frequently in eponymous monthly series. The members of the group are teenage superheroes, many of whom have acted as sidekicks to DC's premier superheroes in the Justice League. The original team later becomes known as the Titans when the members age out of their teenage years, while the Teen Titans name is continued by subsequent generations of young heroes. Created by Bob Haney and Bruno Premiani and first appearing in 1964 in The Brave and the Bold #54, the team was formed by Kid Flash (Wally West), Robin (Dick Grayson), and Aqualad (Garth) before adopting the name Teen Titans in issue 60 with the addition of Wonder Girl (Donna Troy) to their ranks.

Over the decades, DC has cancelled and relaunched Teen Titans many times, and a variety of characters have been featured heroes in its pages. Significant early additions to the initial quartet of Titans were Speedy (Roy Harper), Aquagirl (Tula), Bumblebee (Karen Beecher), Hawk (Hank Hall), Dove (Don Hall), Harlequin (Duela Dent), and three non-costumed heroes: boxer Mal Duncan, psychic Lilith, and caveman Gnarrk. The series would not become a genuine hit until its 1980s revival as The New Teen Titans under writer Marv Wolfman and artist George Pérez. This run depicted the original Titans now as young adults and introduced new characters Cyborg (Victor Stone), Starfire (Koriand'r), and Raven (Rachel Roth), as well as the former Doom Patrol member Beast Boy (Garfield Logan) under his new alias of Changeling, who would all become enduring fan favorites. A high point for the series both critically and commercially was its "The Judas Contract" storyline, in which the Teen Titans are betrayed by their teammate Terra (Tara Markov).

The 1990s featured a Teen Titans team composed entirely of new members before the previous members returned in the series Titans, which ran from the late 1990s to the early 2000s. Subsequent stories in the 2000s introduced a radically different Teen Titans team made up of newer DC Comics sidekicks such as Robin (Tim Drake), Wonder Girl (Cassie Sandsmark), and Impulse / Kid Flash (Bart Allen), as well as Superboy (Conner Kent), some of whom had previously featured in the similar title Young Justice. Later prominent additions from this era included Miss Martian (M'gann M'orzz), Ravager (Rose Wilson), Supergirl (Kara Zor-El), Kid Devil, Blue Beetle (Jaime Reyes), and Solstice (Kiran Singh). Concurrently, DC also published Titans, which featured some of the original and 1980s members now as adults, led by Dick Grayson in his adult persona of Nightwing. Important storylines for the 2000s era of Teen Titans included "Titans Tomorrow" and the company-wide crossover Infinite Crisis.

In the 2010s, The New 52 reboot in 2011 added new characters Bunker (Miguel Jose Barragan) and Skitter (Celine Patterson) to the 2000s roster, although the volume proved commercially and critically disappointing for DC, leading to the return of the original Titans in 2016's DC Rebirth era, alongside a new cast of Teen Titans led by Robin (Damian Wayne) alongside Aqualad (Jackson Hyde) and Kid Flash (Wallace "Ace" West), later joined by Red Arrow (Emiko Queen). Later storylines saw the elder Titans establish a Teen Titans Academy for young heroes and serving as the DC Universe's main heroes during Dark Crisis when the Justice League were declared dead.

The Teen Titans have been adapted to other media numerous times, such as in the animated television series Teen Titans and Teen Titans Go!, and the live-action television series Titans. Within DC Comics, the Teen Titans have been an influential group of characters taking prominent roles in all of the publisher's major company-wide crossover stories. Many villains who face the Titans have since taken on a larger role within the publisher's fictional universe, such as the assassin Deathstroke, the demon Trigon, and the evil organization H.I.V.E..

== Publication history ==
Teen Titans
- Cover for Teen Titans #1 (Jan.–Feb. 1966), art by Nick Cardy

Publication information
- Publisher: DC Comics
- Schedule: Monthly
- Format: Ongoing series
- Publication date: List: (vol. 1) January 1966 – February 1978 (vol. 2) October 1996 – September 1998 (vol. 3) September 2003 – October 2011 (vol. 4) November 2011 – June 2014 (vol. 5) September 2014 – September 2016 (vol. 6) September 2016 – November 2020 (vol. 7) September 2026 – present
- No. of issues: List: (vol. 1): 53 (vol. 2): 24 (vol. 3): 100 (vol. 4): 33 (#1–30, plus issues numbered #0, #23.1 and #23.2) (vol. 5): 24 (plus two Annuals and a Futures End one-shot issue) (vol. 6): 47 (plus two Annuals and a DC Rebirth one-shot issue (vol. 7): 1

Creative team
- Created by: List: (vol. 1): Bob Haney Nick Cardy (vol. 2): Dan Jurgens (vol. 3): Geoff Johns Mike McKone (vol. 4): Scott Lobdell Brett Booth (vol. 5) Will Pfeifer Kenneth Rocafort (vol. 6) Ben Percy (vol. 7) Kyle Higgins
- Written by: List: (vol. 1) Bob Haney Bob Rozakis (vol. 2) Dan Jurgens (vol. 3) Geoff Johns (vol. 4) Scott Lobdell (vol. 5) Will Pfeifer (vol. 6) Ben Percy Adam Glass (vol. 7) Kyle Higgins
- Penciller: List: (vol. 1) Nick Cardy Neal Adams George Tuska Art Saaf Irv Novick (vol. 2) Dan Jurgens (vol. 3) Mike McKone Al Barrionuevo Eddy Barrows Ed Benes Joe Bennett José Luis Nicola Scott (vol. 4) Brett Booth Eddy Barrows Tyler Kirkham (vol. 5) Kenneth Rocafort Felipe Watanabe Miguel Mendonca Ian Churchill (vol. 6) Jonboy Meyers Khoi Pham Bernard Chang (vol. 7) Daniele Di Nicuolo
- Inker: List: (vol. 1) Nick Cardy Bob Smith (vol. 2) George Perez Norm Rapmund (vol. 3) Mario Alquiza Jack Jadson Mariah Benes Doug Hazlewood (vol. 4) Norm Rapmund Eber Ferreira (vol. 5) Trevor Scott Dexter Vines Norm Rapmund

=== Original incarnation ===
Robin (Dick Grayson), Kid Flash (Wally West) and Aqualad (Garth) team up to defeat a weather-controlling villain known as Mister Twister in The Brave and the Bold #54 (July 1964) by writer Bob Haney and artist Bruno Premiani. They appeared under the name "Teen Titans" in The Brave and the Bold #60 (July 1965), joined by Wonder Woman's younger sister Wonder Girl (Donna Troy). (Note: The name "Wonder Girl" itself had been regularly used for a variety of flashback tales of Wonder Woman's childhood exploits.) After being featured in Showcase #59 (December 1965), the Teen Titans were spun off into their own series with Teen Titans #1 by Haney and artist Nick Cardy.

The series' original premise had the Teen Titans helping teenagers and answering calls. Comics historian Les Daniels noted that Haney "took some ribbing for the writing style that described the Teen Titans as 'the Cool Quartet' or 'the Fab Foursome'. The attempt to reach the youth culture then embracing performers like The Beatles and Bob Dylan impressed some observers." Green Arrow's sidekick Speedy makes guest appearances before officially joining the team in Teen Titans #19. Aqualad takes a leave of absence from the group in the same issue, but makes several later guest appearances, sometimes with girlfriend Aquagirl. Neal Adams was called upon to rewrite and redraw a Teen Titans story which had been written by Len Wein and Marv Wolfman. The story would have introduced DC's first African American superhero, but was rejected by publisher Carmine Infantino. The revised story appeared in Teen Titans #20 (March–April 1969). Wolfman and Gil Kane created an origin for Wonder Girl in Teen Titans #22 (July–Aug. 1969) and introduced her new costume. Psychic Lilith Clay and Mal Duncan also join the group. Beast Boy of the Doom Patrol makes a guest appearance seeking membership, but was rejected as too young at the time; existing heroes Hawk and Dove, a duo of teenaged superpowered brothers, appear in issue #21; and time-displaced caveman Gnarrk aids the team in two issues.

The series explored events such as inner-city racial tension and protests against the Vietnam War. One storyline beginning in issue #25 (February 1970) saw the Titans deal with the accidental death of a peace activist, leading them to reconsider their methods. As a result, the Teen Titans briefly abandoned their identities to work as ordinary civilians, but the effort was quickly abandoned. Along the way, Aqualad left the series and the character of Mr. Jupiter, who was Lilith's mentor and employer, was introduced. He financially backed the Titans for a brief period. The series was canceled with #43 (January–February 1973).

=== 1970s revival ===
Teen Titans #44 (Nov. 1976), relaunching the original series, art by Ernie Chan and Vince Colletta

The series resumed with issue #44 (November 1976). The stories included the introductions of African American superheroine Bumblebee and former supervillainess-turned-superheroine Harlequin in issue #48 and the introduction of the "Teen Titans West" team in issues #50–52 consisting of a number of other teen heroes, including Bat-Girl (Betty Kane) and Golden Eagle. The revival was short-lived and the series was cancelled as of issue #53 (February 1978), which featured an origin story. At the end, the heroes realized that, now that they were in their early 20s, they had outgrown the name the "Teen" Titans. In the last panel, without speaking, they all go their separate ways.

The title appeared again in 1999 for Giant Teen Titans Annual #1 (1967) (ISBN 1-56389-486-6), a one-shot special that reprinted selected Silver Age stories in the 1960s-style 80-Page Giant format.

=== The New Teen Titans (1980–1996) ===
New Teen Titans
- Cover to The New Teen Titans #1 (Nov. 1980), art by George Pérez and Dick Giordano

Publication information
- Publisher: DC Comics
- Schedule: Monthly
- Format: Ongoing series
- Publication date: List: The New Teen Titans: November 1980 – March 1984 Tales of the Teen Titans: April 1984 – July 1988 The New Teen Titans vol. 2: August 1984 – November 1988 The New Titans: December 1988 – February 1996 The New Titans vol. 2: May 2026 – present
- No. of issues: List: The New Teen Titans: #1–40 Tales of the Teen Titans: #41–91 The New Teen Titans vol. 2: #1–49 The New Titans: #50–130 plus #0 The New Titans vol. 2: #33–39
- Main character(s): Robin/Nightwing; Cyborg; Kid Flash; Wonder Girl; Raven; Starfire; Beast Boy

Creative team
- Created by: Marv Wolfman; George Pérez
- Written by: Marv Wolfman; Tate Brombal
- Penciller: List: George Pérez Eduardo Barreto Tom Grummett John Byrne José Luis García-López Sami Basri
- Inker: Romeo Tanghal

DC Comics Presents #26 (October 1980) introduced a new team of Titans, anchored by Robin, Wonder Girl, and Kid Flash, and was soon followed by The New Teen Titans #1 (November 1980). The series, created by writer Marv Wolfman and artist George Pérez, re-introduced Beast Boy as Changeling and introduced the machine man Cyborg, the alien Starfire, and the dark empath Raven. Raven, an expert manipulator, forms the group to fight her demonic father Trigon and the team remains together. Both Wolfman and Pérez believed the series would only last six issues, due to overall poor sales at DC Comics.

Wolfman and Pérez's working relationship quickly evolved to the point where they were plotting the series jointly. Wolfman recalled that "once George moved to the same town I lived in, only five blocks or so away, we usually got together for lunch and would work out a story over the next few hours. In many cases I would then go home and write up a plot based on it, or sometimes George would take the verbal plotting we did and take it from there." The series' first twenty issues focused primarily on short, one-shot storylines before both creators decided to attempt "more complex tales" and introduce villains whose "origins and motivations were very different from the norm of the day".

The team's adversaries included Brother Blood, a religious cult leader with supernatural powers, and Deathstroke the Terminator, a mercenary who takes a contract to kill the Titans to fulfill a job his son Grant Wilson had been unable to complete. Based on Wolfman's interest in occult manipulation from his previous work on Marvel's Tomb of Dracula, Brother Blood's "very dark" storyline received praise from older readers but alienated younger readers of the title.

Deathstroke's popularity led to perhaps the most notable Titans storyline of the era. 1984's "The Judas Contract", in Tales of the Teen Titans #42–44 and Tales of the Teen Titans Annual #3, featured a psychopathic girl named Terra with the power to manipulate Earth and all Earth-related materials. She infiltrates the Titans in order to destroy them. "The Judas Contract" won the Comics Buyer's Guide Fan Award for "Favorite Comic Book Story" of 1984 and was later reprinted as a standalone trade paperback in 1988. Robin adopts the identity of Nightwing, while Wally West gives up his Kid Flash persona and quits the Titans. It also featured the introduction of a new member in Jericho, Deathstroke's other son.

Other notable New Teen Titans stories included "A Day in the Lives...", presenting a day in the team members' personal lives; "Who is Donna Troy?", depicting Robin investigating Wonder Girl's origins; and "We Are Gathered Here Today...", telling the story of Wonder Girl's wedding. Tales of the New Teen Titans, a four-part limited series by Wolfman and Pérez, was published in 1982, detailing the back-stories of Cyborg, Raven, Changeling, and Starfire. Wolfman wrote a series of New Teen Titans drug awareness comic books which were published in cooperation with The President's Drug Awareness Campaign in 1983–1984. The first was pencilled by Pérez and sponsored by the Keebler Company, the second was illustrated by Ross Andru and underwritten by the American Soft Drink Industry, and the third was drawn by Adrian Gonzales and financed by IBM.

==== The New Teen Titans (vol. 2) ====
The New Teen Titans relaunched with a new #1 issue in August 1984 as part of a new initiative at DC informally referred to as "hardcover/softcover". The New Teen Titans along with Legion of Super-Heroes and Batman and the Outsiders were the first and only titles included in this program. The same stories were published twice, first in a more expensive edition with higher-quality printing and paper distributed exclusively to comic book specialty stores, then republished a year later in the original format, distributed to newsstands. The title was renamed Tales of the Teen Titans with issue #41, while a new concurrently published series named The New Teen Titans (vol. 2) launched with a new #1 following the release of Tales of the Teen Titans #44 and Annual #3, the conclusion of the "Judas Contract" storyline. After both titles ran new stories for one year, with Tales of the Teen Titans #45–58 taking place prior to the events of The New Teen Titans (vol. 2) #1, and a filler issue reprinting a digest-only story and the original preview story from DC Comics Presents #26, the series began reprinting the first 31 issues of the "hardcover" series (sans several back-up stories focusing on Tamaran that ran in New Teen Titans #14–18), the first Annual, and the lead story from the second Annual, before being cancelled with issue #91.

Issue #1 of The New Teen Titans (vol. 2) created controversy when Grayson and Starfire were depicted in bed together, although it had been established for some time that they were a couple. The initial storyline, "The Terror of Trigon", featured Raven's demon father attempting to take over Earth and Raven's own struggle to remain good despite Trigon's demonic blood inside her. Pérez left the series after issue #5. José Luis García-López followed Pérez as the title's artist and Eduardo Barreto followed García-López. Paul Levitz scripted or fully wrote issues #28–33 to give Wolfman time to catch up on his writing after he fell behind by taking on Crisis on Infinite Earths and History of the DC Universe.

==== Name changed to The New Titans ====
Pérez temporarily returned with issue #50, when the series took the name The New Titans without the "Teen" prefix, as the characters were no longer teenagers.

Issue #50 told a new origin story for Wonder Girl, her link to Wonder Woman having been severed due to retcons created in the aftermath of Crisis on Infinite Earths. Pérez sketched through issues #55, 57 and 60, while only providing layouts for issues #58–59 and 61, with artist Tom Grummett finishing pencils and Bob McLeod as inker. Pérez remained as cover inker to issues #62–67. He would return for the series finale #130 (Feb. 1996) providing cover art. Issues #60 and #61 were part of a five-part crossover with Batman, "A Lonely Place of Dying" and along with issue #65, featured the debut of Tim Drake as the third Robin.

The brief return of Pérez and the addition of Tom Grummett failed to move sales for the book, which were starting to decline. Furthermore, the addition of Danny Chase (a teenage psychic) drew negative fan response due to his abusive attitude towards the rest of the team. Believing Wolfman had grown stagnant, DC assigned Wolfman a new editor, Jonathan Peterson, and gave Peterson authority to override Wolfman over the direction of the book.

With Peterson controlling the book's direction, the series was rapidly overhauled. The Wildebeest, a villain who used proxies and surrogates to hide his true identity while vexing the Titans, was expanded to a full army of villains called the Wildebeest Society and revealed to be a front for the remaining members of the supervillain group H.I.V.E. The group fell under the control of Titan Jericho, who in turn was possessed by the corrupted souls of Azarath. During the "Titans Hunt" storyline that followed (#71–84), Cyborg was destroyed and rebuilt, along with being lobotomized; Danny Chase and Arella (Raven's mother) were killed and resurrected as the gestalt being Phantasm (an identity created by Chase early in the series); while Raven, Jericho, and Golden Eagle were killed. New character Pantha (based on plans for a female Wildcat character Wolfman conceived in the mid-'80s) joined the team, along with Deathstroke, Red Star, and Baby Wildebeest (a creature created by the Wildebeest Society). Deathstroke was also given his own solo book and the team received its first crossover tie-in since Millennium, with The New Titans #81 being part of the "War of the Gods" storyline.

Peterson also saw the launch of Team Titans, which featured a new genetically modified (and heroic) doppelganger of Terra and Donna Troy, who was depowered in the "Total Chaos" crossover. Peterson left the book before "Total Chaos" concluded, leaving Wolfman to deal with the fallout from Peterson's editorially mandated storylines, including the final break-up between Starfire and Nightwing as a couple, the return of Speedy as Arsenal, and the resurrection of Raven as a villain.

Following Zero Hour: Crisis in Time!, the series saw a revamp: Nightwing was removed from the series by Batman editorial and a roster of new young heroes such as Damage and Impulse were inserted into the team to try and renew interest, along with Team Titan survivors Mirage and Terra. New Green Lantern Kyle Rayner was also brought onto the title and given a prominent romance with Donna Troy, whose marriage with Terry Long had collapsed in the pages of Team Titans before the book's cancellation. Sales saw a collapse and despite several crossovers with other books (Damage, Green Lantern, Darkstars, and Deathstroke), the series was cancelled with issue #130. The series finale saw the return of Blackfire as an ally, as the Titans purged Raven of evil once again to prevent Raven and the revived Citadel Empire from reconquering the Vega star system.

==== The New Teen Titans and the Uncanny X-Men ====
The New Teen Titans was widely thought of as DC's answer to the increasingly popular Uncanny X-Men from Marvel Comics, as both series featured all-new members and depicted young heroes from disparate backgrounds whose internal conflicts were as integral to the series as was their combat against villains. The two teams met in the 1982 crossover one-shot entitled "Apokolips... Now", which teamed Darkseid, Deathstroke, and Dark Phoenix against both teams. The story was written by Chris Claremont and drawn by Walt Simonson and Terry Austin.

==== New Titans: Games ====
In 1989, Marv Wolfman and George Pérez began planning a prestige format special, their first work together on the franchise since Pérez left after The New Teen Titans (vol. 2) #5. The project was put on hold when it was decided instead to have Pérez return to the main book as artist and for their first project back together to be "Who Is Wonder Girl?" instead.

Over the course of 1989 and 1990, Wolfman and Pérez continued to work on Games, with over half the project being completed. But the ascension of Jonathan Peterson as editor of the series, and Pérez moving off of New Titans to work on The Infinity Gauntlet for Marvel led to the book being shelved.

In the early 2000s, Wolfman and Pérez approached DC about completing the book as a stand-alone graphic novel. The book was completed in 2010 and published in 2011.

The plot had the New Titans be forced by King Faraday to go after a mysterious mastermind who forces his victims to play deadly "games" for his amusement. In the interim, Wolfman had rewritten the plot (most notably, changing the original ending where Nightwing personally executes the main villain of the series after his "games" result in the death of longtime Titan ally Sarah Simms and the maiming of Danny Chase) though retained several key details (the death of Simms and Chase losing his hands) and several additional twists (the introduction of a previously unknown sibling of Raven, the revelation that the main villain was a schizophrenic Faraday, and the destruction of Titans Tower) that make it impossible to fit into canon. As a result, the story was established to take place in an alternate universe.

=== Teen Titans Spotlight ===
Due to fan backlash over the hardcover/softcover move to the direct market with the main title, a new newsstand Titans book was launched in August 1986 called Teen Titans Spotlight. The series was an anthology series and featured individual members of the Titans in solo stories, often spanning multiple issues. The series also focused on former members of the group (such as Hawk and Aqualad) and the Brotherhood of Evil, detailing the formation of the second version of the group. As the move to the direct market effectively limited The New Teen Titans ability to be part of company-wide crossovers, two issues of Spotlight tied into the Millennium crossover event, with the second issue being the coda for the event.

The series failed to catch on and was cancelled in 1988, along with Tales of the Teen Titans.

=== Team Titans ===
The Team Titans were one of 100 groups sent back through time to prevent the birth of Lord Chaos, the son of Donna Troy and Terry Long. Their mission was to kill the pregnant Troy before she could give birth. Mirage, Killowat, Redwing, Terra, Nightrider, Prestor Jon, and Battalion made up the team.

=== Teen Titans (vol. 2) (1996–1998) ===
Cover of Teen Titans (vol. 2) #5 (Feb. 1997), featuring the 1996–98 team, art by Dan Jurgens and George Pérez

Teen Titans was written and penciled by Dan Jurgens. It began in 1996 with a new #1 (October 1996), with Pérez as inker for the first 15 issues. Atom, who had become a teenager following the events of Zero Hour, leads the brand-new team (of Prysm, Joto, Risk, and Argent). Arsenal became a mentor about halfway through and Captain Marvel Jr. joins the team. The series ended in September 1998.

A contest was held in the letters pages to determine who would join the team. Robin (Tim Drake), won the vote, but editors on the Batman titles banned his appearance, forcing Jurgens to use Captain Marvel Jr. instead. His inclusion failed to boost sales and the series was then cancelled.

=== Titans (1999–2003) ===
Titans
- Cover for Titans #1 (March 1999), art by Mark Buckingham and Wade Von Grawbadger

Publication information
- Publisher: DC Comics
- Schedule: Monthly
- Format: Ongoing series
- Publication date: List: (vol. 1) March 1999 – April 2003 (vol. 2) June 2008 – October 2011 (vol. 3) July 2016 – April 2019 (vol. 4) May 2023 – February 2026
- No. of issues: List: (vol. 1): 50 (vol. 2): 38 (vol. 3): 36, 2 Annuals and a DC Rebirth one-shot (vol. 4): 32

Creative team
- Created by: Devin Grayson; Mark Buckingham
- Written by: List: (vol. 1) Devin Grayson Jay Faerber (vol. 2) Judd Winick Sean McKeever J.T. Krul Eric Wallace (vol. 3) Dan Abnett (vol. 4) Tom Taylor John Layman
- Penciller: List: (vol. 1) Mark Buckingham Adam DeKraker Paul Pelletier (vol. 2) Ian Churchill Joe Benitez Julian Lopez Howard Porter Fabrizio Fiorentino (vol. 3) Brett Booth Paul Pelletier Brandon Peterson Bruno Redondo (vol. 4) Nicola Scott Travis Moor Pete Woods
- Inker: List: (vol. 1) Wade Von Grawbadger Andy Lanning Bud LaRosa (vol. 2) Philip Tan (vol. 3) Norm Rapmund

The team returned in a three-issue miniseries, JLA/Titans: The Technis Imperative, featuring nearly every Titan and showcasing the return of Cyborg. This led into Titans, written by Devin K. Grayson, starting with Titans Secret Files and Origins #1 (March 1999).

This team consisted of Nightwing, Troia, Arsenal, Tempest, the Flash, Starfire, Cyborg, Changeling, Damage and Argent. One new member, Jesse Quick, joined. This team lasted until issue #50 (2002). A short-lived West Coast branch of the team, Titans L.A., was introduced in Titans Secret Files and Origins #2, led by Changeling and Flamebird and consisting of Bumblebee, Bushido, Captain Marvel Jr., Mal Duncan (Herald), Hero Cruz, Matt Logan, and Terra.

Between Teen Titans and Titans, a new generation of young heroes formed a team in Young Justice, consisting of Superboy, Robin, Impulse, Wonder Girl, Secret, and Arrowette. The two series concluded with the three-issue miniseries Titans/Young Justice: Graduation Day, which led to two new series: Teen Titans and Outsiders.

=== Teen Titans (vol. 3) (2003–2011) and Outsiders (vol. 3) (2003–2007) ===
Cover to Teen Titans (vol. 3) #1 (July 2003), art by Mike McKone and Marlo Alquiza

Writer Geoff Johns' Teen Titans series began in 2003, after a three issue miniseries entitled Titans/Young Justice: Graduation Day, which saw Lilith's death and Donna Troy sent to another world after seemingly dying, along with the disbanding of the 1998–2002 Titans roster and the Young Justice team. The relaunch came on the heels of the debut of the Teen Titans animated series on Cartoon Network and reflected DC Comics chief executive Dan DiDio's desire to rehabilitate the Titans as one of DC's top franchises. Launched at the same time was a companion series, a revived version of The Outsiders which featured Nightwing and Arsenal, along with several other Titans members (Captain Marvel Jr. and Starfire).

The series featured several of the main teenage heroes from the Young Justice roster (Robin, Superboy, Wonder Girl, Impulse) and Starfire, Cyborg and Changeling (renamed Beast Boy to reflect the animated series). Raven later returned to the team, reborn in a new teenage body while Jericho was brought back, having escaped death by possessing and laying dormant inside his father Deathstroke's mind.

The series renewed interest in the Titans, but drew sharp complaints due to shifts in the personalities of the various Young Justice characters. Most notably, the decision to have Bart Allen become Kid Flash and the decision to Jettison his happy-go-lucky person in favor of a more serious personality. The series retconned Superboy's origin, making him a hybrid human-Kryptonian clone created from the DNA of Superman and Lex Luthor. Originally, Superboy was a purely human clone created from the DNA of Paul Westfield.

Under Johns, the Teen Titans were front and center during the build-up and events of the Infinite Crisis crossover. During the lead-in of the crossover, Donna Troy came back in a four-part crossover miniseries with the Outsiders called "The Return of Donna Troy", while Superboy and Cassie Sandsmark became a couple. During Infinite Crisis, Titans members Superboy, Pantha, Baby Wildebeest, and Bushido were killed in battle with Superboy-Prime. In addition, Cyborg was severely damaged by cosmic forces unleashed by Alexander Luthor Jr., Starfire was lost in space with several other heroes, while Kid Flash became lost in the Speed Force, re-emerging in the Flash uniform and having aged to adulthood after a failed attempt to stop Superboy-Prime.

==== One Year Later and the post-Geoff Johns Titans ====
Following the events of Infinite Crisis, the Teen Titans fell into a state of chaos. Wonder Girl quit the group to join a cult she believed could resurrect Superboy, while Robin took a leave of absence to travel the globe with Batman and Nightwing. Beast Boy and Raven attempted to keep the Titans going, resulting in a massive open call membership drive that saw a large number of heroes come and join the roster, which was anchored by Beast Boy and Raven. New members include Miss Martian, Kid Devil, Zachary Zatara, Ravager, Bombshell (who like Terra, was a traitor working for Deathstroke), Young Frankenstein, and Osiris.

During this period, Osiris was driven from the team due to a smear campaign launched by Amanda Waller after she manipulated him into killing a super-villain. The smear campaign against Osiris, along with the war between Black Adam and Intergang, led to Adam declaring war on the world. In the ensuing series of battles against the super-hero community, the Titans fought and lost a bloody battle with the villain, culminating in the deaths of Terra and Young Frankenstein. The deaths led to Beast Boy resigning from the team to join the Doom Patrol along with Herald and Bumblebee, while Raven took a leave of absence to purge Jericho of the dark forces that were corrupting him.

Robin and Wonder Girl eventually rejoined the Titans (now located in San Francisco, California) and helped foil Bombshell's plan to frame Miss Martian as Deathstroke's latest mole in the team and allowed Raven to cleanse Jericho of the corruption that had turned him evil. Geoff Johns's final arc on the series would introduce a new villainous "Titans East" team, led by Deathstroke and Batgirl Cassandra Cain.

Soon after, events related to the Countdown story arc impacted the Titans. Duela Dent and Bart Allen are killed; Cyborg leaves, and Supergirl joins and Blue Beetle is invited to train, but the two eventually leave, with the members joining the Justice League of America and Justice League International, respectively. The Titans fight the future, evil adult versions of the group (Titans Tomorrow) and Clock King and the Terror Titans, who are part of Darkseid's underground fight club for metahumans.

After the Batman R.I.P storyline, Robin leaves and Wonder Girl leads the team. Red Devil loses his powers after Brother Blood absorbs them. Miss Martian returns with several teen heroes liberated from the Dark Side Club. A new team is formed: Wonder Girl, Blue Beetle and the now-powerless Red Devil are joined by Kid Eternity and Static, with the new Aquagirl, Miss Martian and a reformed Bombshell signing up.

In the Blackest Night crossover, several dead Titans are resurrected as members of the Black Lantern Corps. In the Titans: Blackest Night miniseries, an emergency team consisting of Donna Troy, Cyborg, Wonder Girl, Starfire, Beast Boy, Kid Flash and the new Hawk and Dove, is formed to defend the Tower. In the ensuing battle, Hawk is killed after her predecessor Hank Hall tears her heart out. At the end of the Blackest Knight crossover, Hank Hall is resurrected and resumes his partnership with Dove. In the main series, Ravager and Jericho fight their father Deathstroke and the dead members of the Wilson family, resurrected as Black Lanterns.

During this time, several back-up stories begin to run in the series: one called "The Coven", starring Black Alice, Zachary Zatara and Traci Thirteen and later, one starring Ravager.

Later storylines involve the corruption of Wonder Girl at the hands of various factors (designed to address complaints about the character's abusive attitudes towards her teammates post-Infinite Crisis), Kid Devil is killed in battle, while Kid Eternity is revealed to have been beaten to death by the Calculator after being kidnapped by him.

J. T. Krul became the writer with issue #88 and penciler Nicola Scott became the book's artist. The issue's teaser shows a line-up of Superboy, Wonder Girl, Raven, Beast Boy, Kid Flash and Ravager. The Titans undergo this roster change in issue #87, the final issue before Krul's run. Following a mission to an alternate dimension to rescue Raven, the team splits. Bombshell and Aquagirl are missing in action, Miss Martian is in a coma and she and a powerless Static leave with Cyborg to go to Project Cadmus to find a way to restore his powers.

Damian Wayne, the current Robin, is announced as a new team member, officially joining in #89. A series for Static was announced. In January 2011, new Titan Solstice debuted in the January 2011 Wonder Girl one-shot. She entered the main Teen Titans title following the crossover with the Red Robin series. During the crossover, Tim asks the Titans for help in tracking down the Calculator after he tries to kill his friend Tamara Fox. Tim rejoins the team as Red Robin (rather than Robin) but Cassie would remain the leader. Following this, Damian quits the team.

The book concluded with a three-part storyline spanning issues #98–100, which saw Superboy-Prime return to destroy the team. A large group of former Titans arrived and the series ended with Prime trapped in the Source Wall. The remainder of the issue consisted of pieces of artwork showcasing the various Teen Titans who appeared in that incarnation of the title, contributed by various DC artists.

=== Titans (vol. 2) (2008–2011) ===
Variant cover for Titans (vol. 2) #1 (June 2008), art by Ethan Van Sciver

A second ongoing Teen Titans series, titled Titans, launched in April 2008 with a cover date of June 2008, written by Judd Winick. The first issue was drawn by Ian Churchill and Norm Rapmund and the second was by Joe Benitez and Victor Llamas. The opening storyline follows the events of the Teen Titans East Special one-shot released in November 2007, revealing that Cyborg's team survived the attack, except Power Boy, dead after being impaled. The team's new line up consists of former New Teen Titans Nightwing, Flash (Wally West), Donna Troy, Beast Boy, Raven, Cyborg, Red Arrow and Starfire.

In the series' first story, Trigon makes a series of attacks on every member, former or current, of the Teen Titans and Trigon has "another child" that, unlike Raven, will assist him in his attack. After reclaiming Titans Island and establishing a headquarters on the East River, Cyborg sets out to create an East Coast Titans team. During a training session, the team was massacred by an unseen force. Though Cyborg survives, Titans' members past and present are attacked by demonic entities across the globe. Raven, sensing Trigon's presence once again, calls upon her former Titans allies to defeat her fiendish father.

After rescuing several Titans and questioning Trigon himself, the Titans learn that Trigon's three children have prepared his second invasion for him. Raven's three half-brothers – Jacob, Jared and Jesse – are responsible. Working as a team, the Titans thwart the Sons of Trigon and stop Trigon's invasion plan. Following this adventure, Raven chooses her adopted family over her biological family, Red Arrow decided to join his former teammates (although both he and Flash retain their JLA membership) and the Titans were back together as a team.

Following this, the team settles at Titans Tower (the New York base), to recover from the events. While Dick and Kory attempt to make a decision on where their relationship will lead, Raven and Beast Boy go out on a "not-a-date". During this, Raven reveals that since she faced her brothers, she has begun to feel as if she is losing control and slipping back under her father's influence. Although Beast Boy rejects the idea, he is unexpectedly blind-sided as Raven gives in to her darker side, under the influence of her half-brother's coaxing. Using her teleporting powers, she and the sons of Trigon vanish, leaving a distraught Beast Boy to warn the others. Using a gemstone that carries Raven's pure essence within it, the Titans free Raven of her father's evil. As a result, Raven leaves each Titan with an amulet that can be used to cleanse any evil influence from her body.

Jericho arrives asking the Titans for help, having become trapped in Match's body after possessing him. It is soon revealed that Jericho has turned renegade again and fights the Titans, influenced by the remnants of those he has possessed over the years. Nightwing resigns from the Titans due to his new responsibilities in Gotham.

==== Brightest Day: Titans – Villains for Hire ====
Promotional image for Titans: Villains for Hire Special featuring the team, art by Fabrizio Fiorentino

A Comic-Con announcement stated that Cyborg, Donna Troy and Starfire were leaving the team to pursue the JLA. Red Arrow, with his daughter Lian, has already relocated and is no longer involved with the Titans, but he got a spotlight in issue #23 after what happens to him in Justice League: Cry for Justice #5. After a series of spotlight issues, Final Crisis Aftermath: INK writer-artist creative team Eric Wallace and Fabrizio Fiorentino took over. Deathstroke took over the team with the Tattooed Man and Cheshire.

One of the new members included Carla Monetti a.k.a. Cinder, a young redheaded woman with the ability to manipulate fire. Osiris, a member during the One Year Later gap, who had been brought back to life after the events of Blackest Night, returned as a member. The final issue of the limited series, Justice League: The Rise of Arsenal ended with an advertisement stating that Arsenal's storyline would continue.

The team debuted in the one-shot issue Titans: Villains for Hire, where they are hired to assassinate Ryan Choi (the Atom) in his home in Ivy Town. The issue quickly became the subject of controversy due to Choi's violent death. Allegations of racial insensitivity dogged DC over the decision to kill off a relatively high-profile Asian character.

Following the one-shot, in the team's inaugural storyline they were hired to assassinate Lex Luthor following the events of War of the Supermen. This is revealed to be a ruse set up by Luthor and Deathstroke to draw out the real assassin, a shape-shifter named "Facade", who had apparently killed and impersonated a woman on Luthor's security detail.

Following several adventures, the Titans are confronted by Ray Palmer and the Justice League for their hand in Ryan's murder. The Titans are nearly defeated, but manage to escape thanks to an intervention from the newly resurrected Isis. Following the battle with the Justice League, Titans concluded with a two-part storyline which saw Jericho's return. The series ended with Arsenal battling Slade for control of the team and the Titans ultimately disbanding and Arsenal taking Jericho under his wing, leaving Slade alone once again.

=== The New 52 (2011–2016) ===
Cover for Teen Titans (vol. 4) #1 (November 2011), art by Brett Booth and Norm Rapmund

DC Comics relaunched Teen Titans with issue #1 (cover dated November 2011) as part of DC's New 52 event, written by Scott Lobdell with former Justice League artist Brett Booth providing interiors. The relaunch was controversial, because it was originally designed as a direct continuation of the previous Teen Titans series before Dan DiDio declared that all previous incarnations of the Titans never existed; this in spite of the fact that early issues of the 2011 series (as well as "Red Hood and the Outlaws" and "Batwoman") made explicit mention of the previous Teen Titans teams.

The new team is formed by Tim Drake, now rebranded as "Red Robin" to protect teenage heroes from a villain known as Harvest and his organization N.O.W.H.E.R.E. A running theme for the 2011–2014 series was Harvest kidnapping young heroes for experimentation and enslavement as part of the villainous scheme for world domination.

The 2011–2014 series featured several crossovers, "The Culling", which had the team meet the Legion of Super-Heroes, as well as "Death of the Family", which focused upon a meeting of Batgirl, Red Hood and the Outlaws, and the Titans, as the Joker kidnapped Red Hood and Red Robin. The 2012 "Zero Month" issue provided the New 52 origin of Tim Drake, recasting him as a young computer hacker who was adopted by Batman to protect him from retaliation by the Penguin.

The 2011–2014 series and Scott Lobdell's writing drew negative reviews, though the Lobdell-created character Bunker was positively received by fans. Criticism included the meandering Harvest/N.O.W.H.E.R.E storyline; the introduction of Bar Torr, a futuristic fundamentalist Christian terrorist based on Bart Allen; and the elimination of the franchise's lore. The character of Raven and Trigon was originally embargoed by Lobdell, but the characters were brought back due to fan demand. The 2011 series also spawned a short-lived spin-off, The Ravagers, which ran for 10 issues and featured Beast Boy, Terra, and Caitlin Fairchild of Gen^{13} in major roles.

The series was relaunched in July with a new issue #1 with Will Pfeifer as writer. The series continued with the characteristics of the main characters, but ignored the events of the Ravagers spin-off, presenting Beast Boy both green and in line with his animated series characteristics. The series also added an African American version of the super-heroine Power Girl to the roster.

Due to the backlash against the removal of the previous incarnations of the Titans (and the ripple effect it had upon characters such as Nightwing and Donna Troy), DC launched a new miniseries called "Titans Hunt", which restored the original 1960s version of the Titans to canon. The series states that all memory of the original Titans was erased by Lilith to protect the team from Mister Twister. It also alludes to further reality alterations to the DC Universe; these are then picked up on in the DC Rebirth initiative, beginning a week after "Titans Hunt", which restores Wally West to canon, along with various aspects of the pre-Flashpoint continuity.

=== DC Rebirth (2016–2020) ===
Cover of Teen Titans (vol. 6) #1 (Oct. 2016) by Jonboy Meyers

The June 2016 DC Rebirth relaunch established two Titans teams: the Titans, with Nightwing, The Flash (Wally West), Lilith, Arsenal, Donna Troy, the Bumblebee and Tempest; and the Teen Titans, consisting of Damian Wayne as Robin, Ace West as Kid Flash, Jackson Hyde as Aqualad, Beast Boy, Starfire and Raven. Titans writer Dan Abnett confirmed in an interview with Newsarama that Titans characters Hawk and Dove, Herald, Gnarrk, and others would be appearing in the new series as well. After "The Lazarus Contract" event, Ace is fired from the Teen Titans and joins Defiance, Deathstroke's version of the Titans. However, Wallace returns to the Teen Titans in issue #14. In Super Sons #7, Superboy (Jon Kent) acts as a temporary member.

As part of the "New Justice" banner for DC Comics, both teams underwent changes in their roster, with Nightwing, Donna Troy, Raven, Steel (Natasha Irons), Beast Boy, Miss Martian and eventually Green Lantern (Kyle Rayner), and Robin, Kid Flash, Red Arrow (Emiko Queen), Crush (Lobo's daughter), Djinn, and Roundhouse for the Teen Titans. The Titans series ended its run at issue #36 (April 2019), while Teen Titans is ended its run in November 2020 at issue #47.

=== Infinite Frontier (2021–2022) ===
In the Teen Titans Academy series, the adult generation of Titans (Nightwing, Starfire, Donna Troy, Beast Boy, Cyborg, and Raven) serve as faculty of a new superhero academy designed to mentor the heroes of tomorrow. Its upperclassmen are the active Teen Titans squad (Bunker, Roundhouse, Crush, Kid Flash, Red Arrow, and Jakeem Thunder), while its new students include three bat-themed Gotham residents (the brawny Megabat, techy Bratgirl, and bat-like metahuman Chupacabra) collectively known as the Bat Pack; the established superhero Billy Batson / Shazam; paraplegic speedster Bolt; EMP-generating Brick Pettirosso; nonbinary ragdoll and apprentice to Doctor Fate, Stitch; Raven's star pupil, Dane; tubular shapeshifter Marvin "Tooby" Murakami; ice-wielder Summer Zahid; simian superhero Gorilla Gregg, nephew of Grodd; Hero dial wielder Miguel Montez; green-prehensile-haired Tress; and the amnesiac, super strong, Matt Price. As the new students and faculty of the academy attempt to establish their new school, they are plagued by appearances of someone assuming the costume of Red X, once worn by Dick Grayson and another mysterious copycat.

As time goes on, the team discover that Dane is the half-demon antichrist, and under the alias Nevermore (reflecting his similarities to Raven), is destined to bring about the apocalypse. In the first story arc's conclusion, the mysterious third Red X is revealed to be Brick, operating under the false belief that Dick Grayson is his father; he was manipulated by the second Red X, who bears a longstanding grudge against Grayson. Dane and Brick's attacks on the Academy cause the structure to collapse, but the students manage to prevent all but minimal casualties. Matt Price fires optic blasts in the final confrontation, indicating to onlookers that he may be a Kryptonian, but Grayson deduces he must be something else, as the blasts give off no heat. The events of Teen Titans Academy lead into the storyline "Dark Crisis", which sees Nightwing, the Titans, and the other younger heroes step up in the Justice League's absence to defeat a possessed Deathstroke's dark army and save the multiverse.

=== Dawn of DC (2023–2024) ===
Following the events of "Dark Crisis" and during the run of writer Tom Taylor on Nightwing, Superman approaches Nightwing with the proposition that he serves as the leader of the new superhero team who succeeds the Justice League following their disbanding. This leads to Nightwing unveiling a new Titans Tower in Blüdhaven with the team consisting of him, The Flash (Wally West), Donna Troy, Beast Boy, Cyborg, Starfire, and Raven. This will lead into a new Titans series written by Taylor and illustrated by Nicola Scott. The Titans' first challenge brings them into conflict with Brother Eternity, a Tamaranean named Xand'r who used to work for the royal family of Tamaran before betraying them to the Citadel, whom has taken over the Church of Blood (now renamed the Church of Eternity) and infuses Tempest with a parasite to turn him against the team. This later leads to the events of Titans: Beast World where Amanda Waller and Doctor Hate (revealed to be Raven's demonic half having escaped her gem and taken on a new form styled after Doctor Fate) take advantage of Beast Boy becoming a Star Conqueror to defeat Brother Eternity's master, a Star Conqueror known as the Necrostar, and use him as part of a plot to transform superheroes and supervillains into mind-controlled animal hybrids. Although the Titans do return everyone to normal, Waller frames the Titans as the culprits for the attack and confiscates the Hall of Justice. In addition, Hate defeats Raven during the incident, imprisons her in her own gem, and poses as her to infiltrate the Titans. Tempest, freed from the parasite, finally joins the team.

=== DC All-In (2024–present) ===
In June 2026, it was announced that a new Teen Titans series would begin publication in September 2026, written by Kyle Higgins, illustrated by Daniele Di Nicuolo, and colored by Marcelo Costa. The series line-up consists of Fairplay, Cheshire Cat, Proxy, and Wildcard, with Jason Todd / Red Hood serving as a reluctant mentor figure.

== Titans Tower ==
Titans Tower is the headquarters of the Teen Titans. The first tower was located in New York City, while later series depict it in California, usually the San Francisco Bay Area. Although the location and appearance of the tower has changed throughout the various series, there are a few defining characteristics, such as always being shaped to resemble the letter "T".

The first tower was built by Silas Stone and located in the East River, New York City. This tower was used as the headquarters for the team throughout The New Teen Titans and New Titans series. It was eventually and ultimately destroyed by the Wildebeest Society in New Titans #76 (June 1991). Because the Titans had fallen out of favor with authorities, the tower was not rebuilt.

The second Titans Tower is located in San Francisco. It was again designed by Cyborg, and was built by the city council. The current tower houses a memorial for deceased Titans members.

The latest Titans Tower is located in Blüdhaven and was built over a destroyed prison. This acts as the headquarters for a new team of Titans, who now act as the world's protectors after the Justice League has gone into a hiatus.

== Collected editions ==
=== Silver Age Teen Titans ===
Title	Material collected	Pages	ISBN
Showcase Presents Teen Titans Vol. 1	The Brave and the Bold #54, 60; Showcase #59; Teen Titans #1–18	528	1-4012-0788-X
Showcase Presents Teen Titans Vol. 2	Teen Titans #19–36; The Brave and the Bold #83, 94; World's Finest Comics #205	512	1-4012-1252-2
The Silver Age Teen Titans Archives Vol. 1	The Brave and the Bold #54, 60; Showcase #59; Teen Titans #1–5	203	1-4012-0071-0
The Silver Age Teen Titans Archives Vol. 2	The Brave and the Bold #83; Teen Titans #6–20	400	978-1-4012-4105-6
Teen Titans: The Silver Age Omnibus	The Brave and the Bold #54, 60, 83; Showcase #59, #75; Teen Titans #1–24; Hawk and Dove #1–6	880	1-4012-6756-4
Teen Titans: The Bronze Age Omnibus	The Brave and the Bold #94, 102, 149; Batman Family #6, 8–9; Teen Titans #25–53	724	1-4012-7075-1
Teen Titans: The Silver Age Vol. 1	The Brave and the Bold #54, 60; Showcase #59; Teen Titans #1–11	360	1-4012-7508-7
Teen Titans: The Silver Age Vol. 2	The Brave and the Bold #83; Teen Titans #12–24	352	1-4012-8517-1
DC Universe Illustrated by Neal Adams Vol. 1	includes Teen Titans #20–22	192	1-4012-1917-9
Giant Teen Titans Annual #1 (1967 issue, published 1999)	Showcase #59; Teen Titans #4; The Flash #164; Wonder Woman #144	80	1-56389-486-6

=== New Teen Titans ===
Hardcovers	Material collected	Pages	ISBN
DC Archives: The New Teen Titans Vol. 1	DC Comics Presents #26, The New Teen Titans #1–8	230	1-56389-485-8
DC Archives: The New Teen Titans Vol. 2	The New Teen Titans #9–16, The Best of DC Blue Ribbon Digest #18	240	1-56389-951-5
DC Archives: The New Teen Titans Vol. 3	The New Teen Titans #17–20, Tales of the New Teen Titans #1–4	228	1-4012-1144-5
DC Archives: The New Teen Titans Vol. 4	The New Teen Titans #21–27, Annual #1	224	1-4012-1959-4
The New Teen Titans Omnibus Vol. 1	DC Comics Presents #26, The New Teen Titans #1–20, The Best of DC Blue Ribbon Digest #18, Tales of the New Teen Titans #1–4	684	1-4012-3108-X
The New Teen Titans Omnibus Vol. 2	The New Teen Titans #21–37, 39–40, Annual #1–2, Tales of the Teen Titans #41–44, Annual #3	736	1-4012-3429-1
The New Teen Titans Omnibus Vol. 3	The New Teen Titans #38, Tales of the Teen Titans #45–50, The New Teen Titans vol. 2 #1–6, The New Titans #50–61, 66–67, Secret Origins Annual #3	792	1-4012-3845-9
The New Teen Titans Omnibus Vol. 1 (New Edition)	DC Comics Presents #26, The New Teen Titans #1–20, The Best of DC Blue Ribbon Digest #18, Tales of the New Teen Titans #1–4	684	978-1-4012-7128-2
The New Teen Titans Omnibus Vol. 2 (New Edition)	The New Teen Titans #21–40, Annual #1–2, Tales of the Teen Titans #41, Batman and the Outsiders #5	656	1-4012-7762-4
The New Teen Titans Omnibus Vol. 3 (New Edition)	Tales of the Teen Titans #41–58, Annual #3, The New Teen Titans Vol. 2 #1–9	720	1-4012-8110-9
The New Teen Titans Omnibus Vol. 4	The New Teen Titans Vol. 2 #10–31, Annual #1–2, Omega Men #34	768	1-4012-8930-4
The New Teen Titans Omnibus Vol. 5	The New Teen Titans Vol. 2 #32–49, Annual #3–4, Infinity, Inc. #45, Secret Origins #13, Annual #3, Tales of the Teen Titans #91	744	1-77950-473-X

Trade paperbacks	Material collected	Pages	ISBN
The New Teen Titans Volume 1	DC Comics Presents #26, The New Teen Titans #1–8	240	978-1-4012-5143-7
The New Teen Titans Volume 2	The New Teen Titans #9–16	232	978-1-4012-5532-9
The New Teen Titans Volume 3	The New Teen Titans #17–20, Tales of the New Teen Titans #1–4	224	978-1-4012-5854-2
The New Teen Titans Volume 4	The New Teen Titans #21–27, Annual #1	224	978-1-4012-6085-9
The New Teen Titans Volume 5	The New Teen Titans #28–34, Annual #2	224	978-1-4012-6358-4
The New Teen Titans Volume 6	The New Teen Titans #35–40, Tales of the Teen Titans #41, Batman and the Outsiders #5	200	978-1-4012-6576-2
The New Teen Titans Volume 7	Tales of the Teen Titans #42–48, Annual #3	224	978-1-4012-7162-6
The New Teen Titans Volume 8	Tales of the Teen Titans #49–58	264	978-1-4012-7496-2
The New Teen Titans Volume 9	The New Teen Titans Vol. 2 #1–9	240	978-1-4012-8125-0
The New Teen Titans Volume 10	The New Teen Titans Vol. 2 #10–15, Annual #1	216	978-1-4012-8824-2
The New Teen Titans Volume 11	The New Teen Titans Vol. 2 #16–23, The Omega Men #34	272	978-1-4012-9520-2
The New Teen Titans Volume 12	The New Teen Titans Vol. 2 #24–31, Annual #2	312	978-1-77950-471-5
The New Teen Titans Volume 13	The New Teen Titans Vol. 2 #32–40, Annual #3, and Infinity, Inc. #45	336	978-1-77950-809-6
The New Teen Titans Volume 14	The New Teen Titans Vol. 2 #41–49, Annual #4; Tales of the Teen Titans #91, and Secret Origins #13, Annual #3	416	978-1-77951-549-0
Terra Incognito	The New Teen Titans #28–34, Annual #2	220	1-4012-7162-6
The Judas Contract	The New Teen Titans #39–40, Tales of the Teen Titans #41–44, Annual #3	192	0-930289-34-X
The Terror of Trigon	The New Teen Titans vol. 2, #1–5	134	1-56389-944-2
Who is Donna Troy?	The New Teen Titans #38, Tales of the Teen Titans #50, The New Titans #50–54, select pages from #55, the "Who Was Donna Troy?" back-up story from Teen Titans/Outsiders Secret Files and Origins 2003	224	1-4012-0724-3

=== New Titans ===
Title	Material collected	Pages	ISBN
Titans: Total Chaos	New Titans #90–92; Deathstroke, The Terminator #14–16; Team Titans #1–3	360	978-1-4012-7864-9

=== The Titans ===
Title	Material collected	Pages	ISBN
JLA/Titans: The Technis Imperative	JLA/Titans #1–3; Titans Secret Files and Origins #1	192	1-4012-2776-7
Titans/Young Justice: Graduation Day	Titans/Young Justice: Graduation Day #1–3 (see also Teen Titans/Outsiders: The Death and Return of Donna Troy below)	55	1-4012-0176-8

=== Teen Titans (vol. 3) (2003–2011) ===
Note: Issues #27–28, penciled by artist Rob Liefeld and written by Gail Simone, are not collected in any of the trade paperbacks and were reprinted in DC Comics Presents: Brightest Day #3 (Feb. 2011), which also included Legends of the DC Universe #26–27 (tying in with characters spotlighted in Brightest Day). Issues #48–49, which tie in with the "Amazons Attack" Wonder Woman story, are likewise not collected in any trade paperback.

Vol. #	Title	Material collected	Pages	ISBN
1	A Kid's Game	Teen Titans vol. 3 #1–7; Teen Titans/Outsiders Secret Files and Origins 2003	192	978-1-4012-0308-5
2	Family Lost	Teen Titans vol. 3 #8–12, ½	136	978-1-4012-0238-5
3	Beast Boys and Girls	Beast Boy #1–4 (1999 miniseries); Teen Titans vol. 3 #13–15	168	978-1-4012-0459-4
4	The Future Is Now	Teen Titans/Legion Special #1; Teen Titans vol. 3 #16–23	224	978-1-4012-0475-4
	Teen Titans/Outsiders: The Insiders	Teen Titans vol. 3 #24–26; Outsiders vol. 3 #24–25, 28	144	978-1-4012-0926-1
	Teen Titans/Outsiders: The Death and Return of Donna Troy	Titans/Young Justice: Graduation Day #1–3; Teen Titans/Outsiders Secret Files and Origins 2003; DC Special: The Return of Donna Troy #1–4	176	1-4012-0931-9
5	Life and Death	Teen Titans vol. 3 #29–33, Annual vol. 3 #1; Robin vol. 4 #146–147; Infinite Crisis #5–6	208	978-1-4012-0978-0
6	Titans Around the World	Teen Titans vol. 3 #34–41	192	978-1-4012-1217-9
7	Titans East	Teen Titans vol. 3 #42–47	144	978-1-4012-1447-0
8	Titans of Tomorrow	Teen Titans vol. 3 #50–54	144	978-1-4012-1807-2
9	On the Clock	Teen Titans vol. 3 #55–61	160	978-1-4012-1971-0
10	Changing of the Guard	Teen Titans vol. 3 #62–69	192	978-1-4012-2309-0
11	Deathtrap	Teen Titans vol. 3 #70, Annual 2009; Titans vol. 2 #12–13; Vigilante vol. 3 #5–6	192	978-1-4012-2509-4
12	Child's Play	Teen Titans vol. 3 #71–78	208	978-1-4012-2641-1
13	Hunt for Raven	Teen Titans vol. 3 #79–87	208	978-1-4012-3038-8
14	Team Building	Teen Titans vol. 3 #88–92, Red Robin #20, Wonder Girl vol. 2 #1	168	978-1-4012-3256-6
15	Prime of Life	Teen Titans vol. 3 #93–100	200	978-1-4012-3424-9
Ravager – Fresh Hell		Backup stories from Teen Titans vol. 3 #72–75, 78–82	144	978-1-4012-2919-1
Teen Titans by Geoff Johns Book One		Teen Titans vol. 3 #1–12, ½, Teen Titans/Outsiders Secret Files and Origins 2003	368	978-1-4012-6598-4
Teen Titans by Geoff Johns Book Two		Teen Titans vol. 3 #13–19, Legends of the DCU 80-Page Giant, Beast Boy #1–4, Teen Titans/Legion Special #1	320	978-1-4012-7752-9
Teen Titans by Geoff Johns Book Three		Teen Titans vol. 3 #20–26 and #29–31 and Outsiders Vol. 3 #24–25	296	978-1-4012-8952-2
Teen Titans by Geoff Johns Omnibus		Teen Titans vol. 3 #1/2-26, 29–46 and 50, Legends of the DC Universe #2 Titans Secret Files and Origins #2, Teen Titans/Outsiders Secret Files 2003, Beast Boy (1999) #1–4, Teen Titans/Legion of Super Heroes Special #1, Outsiders (vol. 3) #24–25, Robin (vol. 4) #146–147, Infinite Crisis #5–6 and Teen Titans Annual #1.	1426	978-1-4012-3693-9

=== Titans (vol. 2) (2008–2011) ===
Vol. #	Title	Material collected	Pages	ISBN
1	Old Friends	Titans East Special #1; Titans vol. 2 #1–6	200	978-1-4012-8428-2
2	Lockdown	Titans vol. 2 #7–11	128	1-4012-2476-8
3	Fractured	Titans vol. 2 #14, #16–22	192	1-4012-2776-7
4	Villains for Hire	Titans: Villains for Hire Special #1; Titans vol. 2 #24–27	160	1-4012-3048-2
5	Family Reunion	Titans vol. 2 #28–32, Shazam! #1	144	978-1-4012-3293-1
6	Broken Promises (cancelled)	Titans vol. 2 #33–38, Annual vol. 2 #1	176	978-1-4012-3360-0
1	Titans Book One: Together Forever	Titans East Special #1; Titans vol. 2 #1–11	320	978-1-4012-8428-2

=== The New 52 Teen Titans (vols. 4–5) (2011–2016) ===
#	Title	Material collected	Pages	Publication date	ISBN
2011–2014
1	It's Our Right to Fight	Teen Titans vol. 4 #1–7	168		978-1-4012-3698-4
The Culling: Rise of the Ravagers		Teen Titans vol. 4 #8–9, Annual vol. 3 #1, Legion Lost vol. 2 #8–9, Superboy vol. 6 #8–9	176		978-1-4012-3799-8
2	The Culling	Teen Titans vol. 4 #8–14, DC Universe Presents #12: Kid Flash	192		978-1-4012-4103-2
3	Death of the Family	Teen Titans vol. 4 #0, #15–17, Batman vol. 2 #17, Red Hood and the Outlaws #16	160		978-1-4012-4321-0
4	Light and Dark	Teen Titans vol. 4 #18–23	144		978-1-4012-4624-2
5	The Trial of Kid Flash	Teen Titans vol. 4 #24–30, Annual vol. 3 #2–3	256		978-1-4012-5053-9
2014–2016
1	Blinded by the Light	Teen Titans vol. 5 #1–7	176		978-1-4012-5237-3
2	Rogue Targets	Teen Titans vol. 5 #8–12, Annual vol. 4 #1	192		978-1-4012-6162-7
3	The Sum of Its Parts	Teen Titans vol. 5 #14–19	144		978-1-4012-6520-5
4	When Titans Fall	Teen Titans vol. 5 #20–24, Annual vol. 4 #2, Teen Titans: Rebirth #1	184		978-1-4012-6977-7

=== DC Rebirth Titans (vol. 3) (2016–2019), Teen Titans (vol. 6) (2016–2020) ===
#	Title	Material collected	Pages	Cover	Publication date	ISBN
Titans
Titans Hunt		Titans Hunt #1–8; Justice League vol. 2 #51, Titans: Rebirth #1	264	SC	September 20, 2016	978-1-4012-6555-7
1	The Return of Wally West	Titans: Rebirth #1, #1–6	168	SC	March 7, 2017	978-1-4012-6817-6
2	Made in Manhattan	Titans vol. 3 #7–10, Titans Annual #1, stories from DC Rebirth Holiday Special #1	152	SC	September 26, 2017	978-1-4012-7377-4
3	A Judas Among Us	Titans vol. 3 #12–18	168	SC	February 20, 2018	978-1-4012-7759-8
4	Titans Apart	Titans vol. 3 #19–22, Titans Annual #2	136	SC	September 25, 2018	978-1-4012-8448-0
5	The Spark	Titans vol. 3 #23–27, Titans Special #1	184	SC	February 19, 2019	978-1-4012-8774-0
6	Into the Bleed	Titans vol. 3 #29–36	192	SC	June 25, 2019	978-1-4012-9167-9
Teen Titans
1	Damian Knows Best	Teen Titans: Rebirth #1, #1–5	144	SC	June 20, 2017	978-1-4012-7077-3
2	The Rise of Aqualad	Teen Titans vol. 6 #6–7, 9–11	128	SC	March 6, 2018	978-1-4012-7504-4
3	The Return of Kid Flash	Teen Titans vol. 6 #13–14, 16–19, a story from DC Rebirth Holiday Special 2017 #1	152	SC	October 9, 2018	978-1-4012-8459-6
1	Full Throttle	Teen Titans Special #1, Teen Titans vol. 6 #20–24	160	SC	April 9, 2019	978-1-4012-8878-5
2	Turn it Up	Teen Titans vol. 6 #25–27, Teen Titans Annual vol. 5 #1, a story from Mysteries of Love in Space #1	144	SC	October 29, 2019	978-1-4012-9467-0
3	Seek and Destroy	Teen Titans vol. 6 #31–38	190	SC	March 31, 2020	978-1-77950-008-3
4	Robin No More	Teen Titans vol. 6 #39–47 and Teen Titans Annual vol. 5 #2	256	SC	February 23, 2021	978-1-77950-668-9
Miscellaneous
The Lazarus Contract		Titans vol. 3 #11, Teen Titans vol. 6 #8, Deathstroke vol. 4 #19–20, Teen Titans Annual vol. 5 #1	136	HC	November 14, 2017	978-1-4012-7650-8
The Lazarus Contract		Titans vol. 3 #11, Teen Titans vol. 6 #8, Deathstroke vol. 4 #19–20, Teen Titans Annual vol. 5 #1	136	SC	July 24, 2018	978-1-4012-8097-0
Super Sons of Tomorrow		Super Sons #11–12, Superman #37–38, Teen Titans #15	136	SC	July 3, 2018	978-1-4012-8239-4
Dark Nights: Metal – The Resistance		Teen Titans #12, Nightwing #29, Suicide Squad #26, Green Arrow #32, The Flash #33, Justice League #32–33, Hal Jordan and the Green Lantern Corps #32, Batman: Lost #1, Hawkman: Found #1	248	SC	July 3, 2018	978-1-4012-8298-1
Justice League/Aquaman: Drowned Earth		Justice League #10–12, Aquaman 40–41, Titans #28, Justice League/Aquaman: Drowned Earth #1, Aquaman/Justice League: Drowned Earth #1	203	HC	April 16, 2019	978-1-4012-9101-3
Teen Titans/Deathstroke: The Terminus Agenda		Teen Titans #28–30, Deathstroke #41–43	168	HC	December 10, 2019	978-1-4012-9965-1
Teen Titans/Deathstroke: The Terminus Agenda		Teen Titans #28–30, Deathstroke #41–43	168	SC	November 3, 2020	978-1-77950-236-0

=== Teen Titans Academy (2021–2022), Titans United (2021) ===
#	Title	Material collected	Pages	Cover	Publication date	ISBN
Teen Titans Academy (2021–2022)
1	X Marks the Spot	Teen Titans Academy #1–5	208	HC	March 8, 2022	978-1-77951-281-9
2	Exit Wounds	Teen Titans Academy #6–15	240	HC	October 11, 2022	978-1-77951-569-8
	Titans United (2021)					
1	Titans United	Titans United #1–7	200	SC	September 27, 2022	978-1-77951-674-9
	Titans United: Bloodpact (2022)					
1	Titans United: Bloodpact	Titans United: Bloodpact #1–6	160	SC	January 3, 2024	978-1-77951-831-6

=== Titans (vol. 4), Tales of the Titans (2023), World's Finest: Teen Titans (2023-2024), Knight Terrors: Titans (2023) ===
#	Title	Material collected	Pages	Cover	Publication date	ISBN
Titans (2023-present)
1	Out of the Shadows	Titans #1-5	120	SC	June 4, 2024	978-1-77952-512-3
2	Beast World	Titans #6-7, Titans: Beast World #1-6	232	SC	August 20, 2024	978-1-77952-812-4
3	The Dark-Winged Queen	Titans #8-15	184	SC	February 25, 2025	978-1-7995-0053-7
4	Hard Feelings	Titans #16-20	136	SC	June 24, 2025	978-1-7995-0190-9
5	Terminated	Titans #21-27	136	SC	November 25, 2025	978-1-7995-0287-6
	Tales of the Titans	Tales of the Titans #1-4	136	SC	April 9, 2024	978-1-77952-714-1
	World's Finest: Teen Titans	World's Finest: Teen Titans #1-6	160	SC	May 21, 2024	978-1-77952-514-7
	Knight Terrors: Terror Titans	Knight Terrors: Titans #1-2, Knight Terrors: Shazam #1-2, Knight Terrors: Angel Breaker #1-2, Knight Terrors: Black Adam #1-2, Knight Terrors: Ravager #1-2	288	SC	March 5, 2024	978-1-77952-568-0
	Titans: Beast World Tour	Titans: Beast World Tour: Metropolis #1, Titans: Beast World Tour: Gotham #1, Titans: Beast World Tour: Atlantis #1, Titans: Beast World Tour: Star City #1, Titans: Beast World Tour: Central City #1	192	SC	August 20, 2024	978-1-77952-813-1

== In other media ==
=== Television ===
The Teen Titans as depicted in The Superman/Aquaman Hour of Adventure

The Teen Titans as depicted in their self-titled TV series

The Titans as depicted in the first season of their self-titled TV series (L–R): Gar Logan (Ryan Potter), Rachel Roth (Teagan Croft), Dick Grayson (Brenton Thwaites), and Kory Anders (Anna Diop)

- The Teen Titans appear in a self-titled segment of The Superman/Aquaman Hour of Adventure, consisting of Speedy, Kid Flash, Wonder Girl, and Aqualad.
- Hanna-Barbera planned to make a Teen Titans TV series, set in the same universe as Super Friends, though nothing came of it.
- The New Teen Titans appear in the 1984 Keebler PSA "New Teen Titans Say No to Drugs", consisting of Wonder Girl, Starfire, Raven, Cyborg, Beast Boy, Kid Flash, and Protector.
- The Teen Titans appear in a self-titled TV series, initially consisting of founding members Robin, Starfire, Cyborg, Raven, and Beast Boy. Additionally, Thunder and Lightning, Hot Spot, Wildebeest, Titans East, Red Star, Kole, Gnarrk, Melvin, Timmy Tantrum, Teether, Bobby, Kid Flash, Argent, Bushido, Herald, Jericho, Killowat, Pantha, and Jinx appear as honorary members throughout the series.
- The Teen Titans appear in the Batman: The Brave and the Bold episode "Sidekicks Assemble!", consisting of Robin, Speedy, and Aqualad.
- The Teen Titans serve as partial inspiration for Young Justice.
- The Teen Titans appear in the Mad short "Teen Titanic", consisting of Robin, Raven, Cyborg, Beast Boy, Starfire, Blue Beetle, Superboy, Kid Flash, Wonder Girl, and Aqualad.
- The Teen Titans appear in the "New Teen Titans" segment of DC Nation Shorts, consisting of Robin, Starfire, Cyborg, Raven, and Beast Boy.
- The Teen Titans appear in Teen Titans Go! (2013), consisting of Robin, Starfire, Cyborg, Raven, and Beast Boy.
- A Teen Titans animated series meant to be loosely set in the DC Animated Universe was planned, but abandoned.
- Two iterations of the Titans appear in a self-titled TV series, with the first incarnation consisting of founding members Dick Grayson, Aqualad, Wonder Girl, and Hawk and Dove as well as later recruit Jericho while Grayson eventually joins Kory Anders, Rachel Roth, and Gar Logan to form a new incarnation years later. As the series progresses, Jason Todd, Rose Wilson, Superboy, and Krypto join the group while Aqualad, Wonder Girl, and Hawk and Dove rejoin.
- The Teen Titans appear in the DC Super Hero Girls episode "#TweenTitans", consisting of preteen incarnations of Robin, Starfire, Beast Boy, Cyborg, and Raven.
- Cosplayers resembling the Teen Titans appear in the My Adventures with Superman episode "Mobile Suit Toyman".

=== Film ===
- The Teen Titans appear in Teen Titans: Trouble in Tokyo (2006), consisting of Robin, Starfire, Cyborg, Raven, and Beast Boy.
- In May 2007, Warner Bros. announced a Teen Titans film was in development, with Robin as a confirmed member and Akiva Goldsman and Mark Verheiden writing the film. In 2014, Goldsman announced the development of Titans (see above), leaving the film's production in question. Heroic Hollywood's El Mayimbe later announced on Collider Heroes that Warner Bros. was developing both a Teen Titans film with Cyborg, among others, and an all-female group of heroes.
- The Teen Titans make a non-speaking background cameo appearance in Justice League: The New Frontier.
- The Teen Titans appear in films set in the DC Animated Movie Universe (DCAMU):
  - They first appear in Justice League vs. Teen Titans, consisting of Starfire, Raven, Blue Beetle, and Beast Boy as well as new recruit Robin and occasional ally Dick Grayson.
  - The Teen Titans appear in Teen Titans: The Judas Contract, consisting of current members Starfire, Blue Beetle, Raven, Beast Boy, and Robin as well as founding members Dick Grayson, Speedy, Kid Flash, and Bumblebee.
  - The Teen Titans appear in Justice League Dark: Apokolips War, consisting of Dick Grayson, Starfire, Blue Beetle, Raven, Beast Boy, Robin, Speedy, Kid Flash, Bumblebee, Superboy, Wonder Girl, and Ace West.
- The Teen Titans appear in the theatrically released animated film Teen Titans Go! To the Movies (2018).
- Two incarnations of the Teen Titans appear in Teen Titans Go! vs. Teen Titans (2019), with both consisting of Robin, Beast Boy, Cyborg, Starfire, and Raven.
- A live-action Teen Titans feature film was reported to be in development as part of the DC Universe (DCU) media franchise at DC Studios in March 2024, to be written by Ana Nogueira.

=== Video games ===
- The Teen Titans appear in a self-titled video game (2005), consisting of Robin, Starfire, Cyborg, Raven, and Beast Boy.
- The Teen Titans appear in a self-titled video game (2006), consisting of Robin, Starfire, Cyborg, Raven, and Beast Boy.
- The Teen Titans appear in DC Universe Online.
- The Teen Titans make non-speaking cameo appearances in Cyborg and Starfire's endings in Injustice 2, with Cyborg, Starfire, Superboy, Wonder Girl, and Beast Boy appearing in the former ending and Robin, Raven, Starfire, Cyborg, and Beast Boy appearing in the latter ending.

=== Miscellaneous ===
- The Teen Titans appear in Teen Titans Go! (2004), primarily consisting of Robin, Starfire, Cyborg, Raven, and Beast Boy. Additionally, a villainous alternate universe incarnation of the Titans called the Teen Tyrants appear in issue #48, consisting of Red Robin (Robin's counterpart), Tempest (Aqualad's counterpart), Arsenal (Speedy's counterpart), Red Raven (Raven's counterpart), and Blackfire (Starfire's counterpart).
- The Teen Titans appear in Smallville Season 11, consisting of Superboy, Speedy, Blue Beetle, Miss Martian, Zan and Jayna, and Raven. This version of the group are students of Jay Garrick's school for the gifted.
- The Teen Titans appear in the Injustice: Gods Among Us prequel comic, consisting of Superboy, Beast Boy, Wonder Girl, Starfire, and Red Robin. Additionally, Dick Grayson, Cyborg, and Raven appear as former members.

== See also ==
- List of Teen Titans members
- List of Teen Titans comics
