= Infinite Crisis =

2005–2006 comic book limited miniseries by DC Comics

- Cover of Infinite Crisis #1 (December 2005). Art by George Pérez

Publication information
- Publisher: DC Comics
- Schedule: Monthly
- Format: Limited series
- Publication date: December 2005 – June 2006
- No. of issues: 7
- Main characters: Superman; Batman; Wonder Woman; Alexander Luthor Jr.; Superboy-Prime; Green Lantern (Hal Jordan); rest of DC Universe

Creative team
- Created by: Geoff Johns; Phil Jimenez
- Written by: Geoff Johns
- Pencillers: Phil Jimenez; Jerry Ordway; George Pérez; Ivan Reis
- Inker: Andy Lanning
- Colorists: Jeromy Cox; Guy Major

Collected editions
- Infinite Crisis (hardcover): ISBN 1-4012-0959-9
- Infinite Crisis (softcover): ISBN 1-4012-1060-0

"Infinite Crisis" is a 2005–2006 comic book storyline published by DC Comics, consisting of an eponymous, seven-issue comic book limited series written by Geoff Johns and illustrated by Phil Jimenez, George Pérez, Ivan Reis, and Jerry Ordway, and a number of tie-in books. The main miniseries debuted in December 2005, and each issue was released with two variant covers: one by Pérez and one by Jim Lee and Sandra Hope.

The series storyline was a sequel to DC's 1985 limited series Crisis on Infinite Earths, which "rebooted" much of the DC continuity in an effort to fix inconsistencies and contradictions within the fictional DC Universe that were seen as confusing or complicated. Infinite Crisis revisited characters and concepts from Crisis, including the existence of DC's Multiverse. Some of the characters featured were alternate versions of comic icons such as an alternate Superman named Kal-L, who came from a parallel universe called Earth-Two. A major theme was the nature of heroism, contrasting the often dark and conflicted modern-day heroes with memories of "lighter" and comparatively more noble and collegial heroes of American comic books' earlier days.

Infinite Crisis #1 was ranked first in the top 300 comics for October 2005 with pre-order sales of 249,265. This was almost double the second ranked comic House of M #7, which had pre-order sales of 134,429. Infinite Crisis #2 was also the top seller in top 300 comics for November 2005 with pre-order sales of 207,564.

== Overview ==
The plot begins when, in Crisis on Infinite Earths, Kal-L (the Superman of pre-Crisis Earth-Two), the Superboy of Earth Prime, Alexander Luthor Jr. of pre-Crisis Earth-Three, and Lois Lane Kent of pre-Crisis Earth-Two voluntarily sequestered themselves in "paradise". DC officially began leading up to the new Crisis with a one-shot issue Countdown to Infinite Crisis, followed by four six-issue limited series that tied into and culminated in Infinite Crisis.

Once the Crisis was completed, DC used the One Year Later event to move the narratives of most of its DC Universe series forward by one year. The weekly series 52 began publication in May 2006, and depicts some of the events which occurred between Infinite Crisis and One Year Later.

In June 2008, a third series (Final Crisis), set immediately following the conclusion of Countdown, began.

== Publication history ==
=== Lead-ups ===
Infinite Crisis was announced in March 2005. The event was kicked off with the release of Countdown to Infinite Crisis. Countdown to Infinite Crisis was followed by four six-issue limited series: The OMAC Project, Rann–Thanagar War, Day of Vengeance, and Villains United, as well as a four-part limited series DC Special: The Return of Donna Troy. These first four limited series each had a special tie-in issue, released at monthly intervals during the Infinite Crisis event.

=== Tie-ins ===
As with many large-scale comic crossovers, Infinite Crisis featured a number of tie-ins. Before the event was announced, books such as Adam Strange and Identity Crisis were being described as part of bigger plans. After Countdown, several books were identified as tie-ins to the four mini-series. Thus, although Infinite Crisis itself is only seven issues long, its plot elements appeared in dozens of publications.

Some of these books were of direct and major importance, such as the Superman: Sacrifice and JLA: Crisis of Conscience storylines, the latter of which ended with the Justice League's lunar Watchtower being destroyed, leading directly into Infinite Crisis #1. Another notable tie-in is Batman: Under the Hood, which features the return of the long-dead second Robin, Jason Todd, as the antihero Red Hood.

- Countdown to Infinite Crisis #1
- Infinite Crisis #1–7
- Infinite Crisis Secret Files and Origins 2006
- Day of Vengeance #1–6, Infinite Crisis Special #1
- The OMAC Project #1–6, Infinite Crisis Special #1
- Rann–Thanagar War #1–6, Infinite Crisis Special #1
- Rann-Thanagar Holy War #1–8
- Villains United #1–6, Infinite Crisis Special #1
- Action Comics #826, 829–831, 836
- Adam Strange Special #1
- Adventures of Superman #639, 642–643, 645, 648–649
- Aquaman #35, 37
- Batman #635–641, 645–650, Annual #25
- Batman: Gotham Knights #66
- Birds of Prey #83, 87–90
- Breach #7
- Blood of the Demon #6–7
- Catwoman #46–49
- DC Special: The Return of Donna Troy #1–4
- Firestorm #17–22
- The Flash #225
- Gotham Central #37
- Green Arrow #52-59
- Green Lantern #7
- Hawkman #46–49, Special #1
- JLA #115–125
- JSA #73–80, 82
- JSA Classified #4
- Manhunter #13–14
- Nightwing #109–110, 112–117
- Outsiders #29–33
- Robin #140–147
- Superman #216–217, 219, 221–226
- Teen Titans #29–33, Annual #1
- Wonder Woman #219–221, 224
- Crisis Aftermath: The Battle for Bludhaven #1–6
- Crisis Aftermath: The Spectre #1–3
- DCU: Brave New World
- Superman Secret Files and Origins 2004

=== Editorial planning ===
DC Comics executive editor Dan DiDio stated that Infinite Crisis was being hinted at in various stories for two years prior to its launch, starting with the "death" of Donna Troy.

With Countdown to Infinite Crisis, Infinite Crisis began to visibly affect DC's editorial policy. Mark Waid signed an exclusive contract with DC, receiving a similar editorial role. DC replaced its official decades-old logo (the "DC Bullet") with a new one (the "DC spin") that debuted in the first issue of DC Special: The Return of Donna Troy.

Aside from marking a major editorial shift within DC Comics, Infinite Crisis was a return to large company-wide crossovers of a sort that had been uncommon since the downturn of the comic industry in the 1990s.

== Plot ==
The story begins in the wake of the four lead-in limited series, with Superman, Wonder Woman, and Batman feuding, the JLA Watchtower destroyed, and the heroes of the world all facing a variety of menaces. Over this backdrop, Kal-L (the Earth-Two Superman), along with Earth-Two's Lois Lane, Earth-Three's Alexander Luthor Jr., and Superboy-Prime escape from the pocket universe to which they had initially fled at the end of Crisis on Infinite Earths. Kal-L seeks out his cousin, Power Girl, also a survivor of Earth-Two. Believing Lois' health will improve on her native world, he hopes to replace the current Earth with Earth-Two, which he considers perfect.

Kal-L tries to enlist Batman's support, stating that the post-Crisis Earth's inherent "bad" nature caused Batman's recent mistrust and hostility. Batman refuses and tries to use his kryptonite ring. This fails as the kryptonite is not native to Kal-L's universe, and Superman destroys it with his heat-vision. Afterward, Batman learns Superboy-Prime destroyed the JLA Watchtower.

Alexander reveals to Power Girl that he and Superboy-Prime had been leaving their "paradise" for some time, manipulating events to help create an inter-dimensional tuning fork. Using the Anti-Monitor's remains and captured heroes and villains attuned to former universes, Alex restores Earth-Two, unpopulated except for the Earth-Two heroes transported there.

Superboy-Prime attacks Conner Kent, this world's Superboy. Multiple super-teams intervene. Superboy-Prime kills Teen Titans members Pantha, Baby Wildebeest, and Bushido and maims Risk, ripping off his right arm. The Flashes and Kid Flash (Bart Allen) force Prime into the Speed Force, assisted by the speedsters already within it. Jay Garrick, the only speedster left behind, says the Speed Force is now gone.

Seeking to create a perfect world, Alexander restores many alternate Earths. When Earth-Two Lois dies of old age, an aggrieved Kal-L and the younger post-Crisis Superman Kal-El fight until Wonder Woman separates them. Bart Allen (wearing Barry Allen's costume and aged to adulthood) emerges from the Speed Force, warning that he and the other speedsters were unable to hold Superboy-Prime, who returns wearing Anti-Monitor inspired armor that stores yellow sun radiation to empower him, making him even stronger.

Batman's strike force destroys Brother Eye, a satellite AI created by Batman that had gone rogue and begun transforming civilians into nano-infused robots geared to hunt down and exterminate supers. Alexander selects and merges alternate Earths, trying to create a "perfect" Earth, until Firestorm blocks his efforts. Conner, Nightwing, and Wonder Girl release the Tower's prisoners. Fighting each other, Conner and Superboy-Prime collide with the tower, destroying it. The multiple Earths recombine into a "New Earth" as Conner dies in Wonder Girl's arms. Power Girl soon arrives and asks Kal-El what happened to Lois. The answer causes her to break down prompting her to ask Kal-L why. He answers her simply, telling her it was because he chose the wrong Superboy to condemn and the wrong Superboy to condone.

When a horde of supervillains attack Metropolis, heroes, current and retired, fly off to the rescue, and they are joined by the National Guard. The battle results in multiple deaths on both sides, including many by Superboy-Prime himself, who kills villains and heroes alike. During the battle, Superboy-Prime takes off to destroy Oa, planning to collapse the universe in a big bang event, and recreate it with himself as the only superhero. Superboy-Prime is slowed down by a 300-mile thick wall of willpower created by the Green Lantern Corps, but he kills thirty-two Green Lanterns before Kal-L and Kal-El carry him toward a kryptonite field surrounding the remnants of Krypton. The Supermen fly Superboy through Krypton's red sun Rao, destroying his armor and causing all three Kryptonians' powers to diminish. Falling to the sentient planet (and Green Lantern Corps member) Mogo, they fight. Kal-El finally knocks Superboy-Prime out before succumbing to kryptonite poisoning, and the older Superman Kal-L dies of his injuries.

Back on Earth, Batman, struggling with Superboy's death and Nightwing's severe injuries sustained during the Metropolis battle, contemplates shooting Alex. Batman is dissuaded by Wonder Woman. Alex manages to escape.

Wonder Woman, Batman, and Superman later meet up in Gotham City. Wonder Woman plans to find out who she is. Batman plans a similar journey of self-discovery, revisiting the training of his youth, this time with Dick Grayson, now healthier, and with Tim Drake joining him. Superman retires from super heroics until his powers return, focusing his career as a journalist in the meantime.

Hiding in an alley in Gotham City and making new plans, Alexander Luthor is found by Lex Luthor and the Joker. The Joker mutilates Alexander by spraying acid onto his face, then electrifies it, and kills Alexander by shooting him as Lex mocks him.

The Green Lantern Corps imprison Superboy-Prime inside a red Sun-Eater. The series ends with him carving an S into his chest and declaring that he has escaped from worse prisons than this.

== Collected editions ==
Title	Material collected	Published date	ISBN
Infinite Crisis	Infinite Crisis #1–7	December 2006	978-1401210601
Absolute Infinite Crisis	Infinite Crisis #1–7	December 2016	978-1401265359
Day of Vengeance	Day of Vengeance #1–6, Action Comics #826, Adventures of Superman #639, Superman #216	November 2005	978-1401208400
The OMAC Project	The OMAC Project #1–6, Countdown to Infinite Crisis, Wonder Woman #219	January 2006	978-1845762292
Rann–Thanagar War	Rann–Thanagar War #1–6	March 2006	978-1845762315
Villains United	Villains United #1–6	April 2006	978-1845762322
Superman: Infinite Crisis	Infinite Crisis Secret Files & Origins, Infinite Crisis #5, Superman #226, Action Comics #836, Adventures of Superman #649	August 2006	978-1845763428
Superman: Sacrifice	Superman #218-220, Adventures of Superman #642-643, Action Comics #829, Wonder Woman #219-220	January 2006	978-1401209193
JLA: Crisis of Conscience	JLA #115-119	May 2006	978-1845762797
JLA: World Without a Justice League	JLA #120-125	August 2006	978-1845763350
Infinite Crisis: Companion	Day of Vengeance: Infinite Crisis Special, The OMAC Project: Infinite Crisis Special, Rann–Thanagar War: Infinite Crisis Special, Villains United: Infinite Crisis Special,	October 2006	978-1401209223
Infinite Crisis Omnibus	Action Comics #826, 829, Adventures Of Superman #639, 642, Countdown To Infinite Crisis, Day Of Vengeance #1-6, Day Of Vengeance Infinite Crisis Special, JLA #115-119, Infinite Crisis #1-7, Infinite Crisis Secret Files, The OMAC Project #1-6, The OMAC Project Infinite Crisis Special, Rann-Thanagar War #1-6, The Rann-Thanagar Infinite Crisis Special, Superman #216, 219, Villains United #1-6, Villains United Infinite Crisis Special, Wonder Woman #219	June 2012	978-1401235024

=== Hardcover revisions ===
The hardcover collecting all seven issues of Infinite Crisis included changes in coloring, as well as, more significantly, alterations in dialogue, most of which relate to hints to the re-emergence of the DC Multiverse. Also changed is the two-page spread near the end of the book, where a new George Pérez image is substituted. Four additional pages of art by Phil Jimenez were added, who also illustrated new cover art for the dust jacket of hardcover collection. An interview section included as an afterword explains the reasoning behind some of these alterations.

== Consequences ==
=== Aftermath ===
- 52: Weekly comic book presenting events that occur during the year between Infinite Crisis #7 and the One Year Later stories.
- Crisis Aftermath: The Battle for Blüdhaven #1–6
- Crisis Aftermath: The Spectre #1–3
- Crisis Aftermath: In the Wake of Infinite Crisis: Brave New World
- One Year Later: After the publication of Infinite Crisis #5, storylines in most DC Universe series jumped forward one year, occurring after the events chronicled in 52.
- Countdown to Final Crisis is a weekly series that is actually a lead in to yet another crisis, Final Crisis. It does not take place immediately after 52; it actually, chronologically speaking, takes place concurrently with the comics DC was publishing at the time, over a year (in real world time, less in internal comic book time) after the One Year Gap.

=== Series cancelled during the crossover ===
A number of series were cancelled with the "One Year Later" jump. Some ended outright, like Batgirl, Gotham Central, and Batman: Gotham Knights, while others were suspended and restarted later with new volumes, notably JLA, JSA, Flash, and Wonder Woman. Additionally, Adventures of Superman returned to its original title of Superman, while the book that had previously been coming out as Superman since 1987 was canceled, thus making the Superman line's two books, Superman and Action Comics, match the Batman lines Batman and Detective Comics (in addition to the shared title Superman/Batman.)

== Alternate versions ==
In Dark Multiverse: Infinite Crisis, after Ted Kord takes over Checkmate when he kills Maxwell Lord, he manages to subvert most of Alexander Luthor's plans before confronting Luthor and Superboy-Prime directly.

== Adaptations ==
Ace Books, under the imprint of the Berkley Publishing Group and published by the Penguin Group, released an October 2006 novelization adaptation of the series written by Greg Cox, with an introduction by Mark Waid, and cover art designed by Georg Brewer and illustrated by Daniel Acuña. The novel was primarily adapted from the seven-issues mini-series published by DC Comics (December 2005 to June 2006). Additional materials on the book was adapted from:

- Aquaman #37 (February 2006)
- Day of Vengeance: Infinite Crisis Special (March 2006)
- Gotham Central #38 (February 2006)
- JLA #119 (November 2005)
- JSA Classified #4 (December 2005)
- Rann/Thanagar War: Infinite Crisis Special (April 2006)
- Teen Titans #32 (March 2006)
- Wonder Woman (vol. 2) #223–224 (January and February 2006)

GraphicAudio produced an audiobook of the novelization of Infinite Crisis. The audiobook spans two volumes with 6 CDs each and features a full cast, music and sound effects. Volume 1 and 2 were released in May–July 2007.

=== Video game ===
A multiplayer online battle arena video game adaptation loosely based on the comic book series was developed by Turbine, Inc. and released in 2015.
