= List of Teen Titans members =

The Teen Titans is a team of teenage comic book superheroes created by DC Comics. Portrayals of the team have undergone many iterations with different sets of characters. Alternate versions of the team appear in parallel universes, and the team has also been portrayed differently in other media, including television and video games.

The Brave and the Bold #54, which first teamed up DC Comic characters Robin, Kid Flash, and Aqualad in 1964, is now regarded as the first Teen Titans story even though they were not given a team name at the time.

== Titans ==
=== Original team (1960s–1970s) ===
Character	Alias(es)	Joined	Notes
Richard John "Dick" Grayson	Robin, Nightwing, Batman	The Brave and the Bold #54 (Jul. 1964)	Founding member and leader.; Adoptive son of Batman.; First appeared in Detective Comics #38.; Became Nightwing in Tales of the Teen Titans #44. Temporarily operated under the Batman title following Zero Hour, and again following Batman R.I.P. Reinstated as Nightwing in the New 52.
Wallace Rudolph "Wally" West	Kid Flash, Flash	The Brave and the Bold #54 (Jul. 1964)	Founding member.; Nephew of the second Flash, Barry Allen.; First appeared in The Flash #110.; Became Flash in Crisis on Infinite Earths.; Disappeared after the New 52 but reappeared in DC Rebirth.
Garth	Aqualad, Tempest	The Brave and the Bold #54 (Jul. 1964)	Founding member.; Adoptive son of Aquaman. (Note: In post-Rebirth continuity, Garth is no longer Arthur Curry's adoptive son.); First appeared in Adventure Comics #269.; Became Tempest in Tempest #2.; Died in Blackest Night #2. Reintroduced in DC Rebirth.
Donna Troy	Wonder Girl, Troia, Darkstar	The Brave and the Bold #60 (Jul. 1965)	Founding member.; Younger adoptive sister of Wonder Woman.; Died in Titans/Young Justice: Graduation Day #3. Resurrected in The Return of Donna Troy #1.; Disappeared after the New 52 but reappeared in DC Rebirth.
Roy William Harper Jr.	Speedy, Arsenal, Red Arrow	Teen Titans #19 (Note: Although Roy officially debuted as a Teen Titan in Teen Titans #19, he originally appeared in Teen Titans #4.) (Feb. 1969)	Founding member. (Note: Roy was retconned into a founding member in Teen Titans #53.); Adoptive son of Green Arrow and the second Black Canary, Dinah Lance.; First appeared in Adventure Comics #246.
Lilith Clay	Lilith, Omen	Teen Titans #25 (Feb. 1970)	Leader of Titans West.; Died in Titans/Young Justice: Graduation Day #3. Reintroduced in the New 52.
Henry "Hank" Hall and Donald "Don" Hall	Hawk and Dove	Teen Titans #25 (Feb. 1970)	Brothers.; First appeared in Showcase #75.; Don died in Crisis on Infinite Earths #12. Both brothers disappeared after the New 52 relaunch.
Malcolm Arnold "Mal" Duncan	Guardian, Hornblower, Herald	Teen Titans #26 (Apr. 1970)	DC's first black superhero.; Became Herald during the New 52.
John Gnarrk	Gnaark, Cave Boy	Teen Titans #33 (Jun. 1971)	Also a member of Titans West.; First appeared in Teen Titans #32.; Reported dead in Tales of the Teen Titans #50.; Became Cave Boy during the New 52.
Duela Dent	Joker's Daughter, Harlequin	Teen Titans #46 (Feb. 1977)	Former member of Titans East.; Claimed to be the daughter of Catwoman, Scarecrow, Riddler, Penguin, and Two-Face.; First appeared in Batman Family #6.; Died in Countdown #51. Reintroduced as the Joker's Daughter in the New 52.
Karen Beecher	Bumblebee	Teen Titans #48 (Jun. 1977)	Also a member of Titans L.A.; First appeared in Teen Titans #45.
Mary Elizabeth "Bette" Kane	Bat-Girl, Flamebird	Teen Titans #52 (Dec. 1977)	Also a member of Titans West.; Niece of Batwoman pre-Crisis and maternal cousin of Batwoman and Batman post-Crisis.; First appeared in Batman #139.
Garfield Mark Logan	Beast Boy, Changeling	Teen Titans #52 (Dec. 1977)	Also a member of Titans West.; Founding member of the New Teen Titans.; Founder of Titans L.A.; Adoptive son of Mento and Elasti-Girl.; First appeared in Doom Patrol #99.

=== New Teen Titans ===
Character	Alias(es)	Joined	Notes
Raven	Rachel Roth	DC Comics Presents #26 (Oct. 1980)	Founding member of the New Teen Titans.
Koriand'r	Starfire	DC Comics Presents #26 (Oct. 1980)	Founding member of the New Teen Titans.
Vic Stone	Cyborg	DC Comics Presents #26 (Oct. 1980)	Founding member of the New Teen Titans.
Tara Markov	Terra	New Teen Titans #30 (Apr. 1983)	Double-agent under villain Deathstroke. Younger half-sister of Geo-Force.; First appeared in New Teen Titans #26.; Died in Tales of the Teen Titans Annual #3. Reanimated in Blackest Night: Titans #1. Reintroduced during the New 52.
Joseph Wilson	Jericho	Tales of the Teen Titans #58 (Oct. 1985)	Son of Deathstroke.; First appeared in Tales of the Teen Titans #42. Honorary member beginning in New Teen Titans #1.; Died in New Titans #83. Resurrected in Teen Titans #40. Appears alongside his father during the New 52.
Jason Todd	Robin	New Teen Titans #20 (May 1986)	Honorary member.; Adoptive son of Batman and younger adoptive brother of Nightwing.; First appeared in Batman #401.; Died in Batman #428. Became the Red Hood after being resurrected. Reformed the Outlaws during the New 52.
Danny Chase	Phantasm	New Teen Titans Annual #3 (Aug. 1987)	Fired from the team in New Titans #55. Rejoined before quitting in New Titans #114.; Became Phantasm in New Titans #73 after faking his death. Died and merged with the Phantasm entity in New Titans #84.; Reintroduced post-New 52.
Rosabelle Mendez	Pantha	New Titans #74 (Mar. 1991)	Died in Infinite Crisis #4.; Reintroduced during Dawn of DC.
Leonid Kovar	Red Star	New Titans #77 (Jun. 1991)	Team member during one-year gap.; Disappeared during the New 52 but reappeared during DC Rebirth.
Baby Wildebeest		New Titans #85 (Apr. 1992)	Adopted by Pantha.; Died in Infinite Crisis #4.

=== Arsenal's Titans ===
Character	Alias(es)	Joined	Notes
Bart Allen	Impulse, Kid Flash	New Titans #0 (Oct. 1994)	Grandson of the second Flash, Barry Allen.; First appeared in The Flash #92.; Died in The Flash: The Fastest Man Alive #13. Resurrected in Final Crisis: Legion of 3 Worlds as Kid Flash. Died again in Flashpoint: Kid Flash Lost #3.; Reintroduced in DC Rebirth.
Grant Emerson	Damage	New Titans #0 (Oct. 1994)	Son of the first Atom, Al Pratt.; First appeared in Damage #1.; Died in Blackest Night #4.; Reintroduced in Doomsday Clock.
Kyle Rayner	Green Lantern	New Titans #116 (Dec. 1994)	First appeared in Green Lantern #48.; Incorporated into the New 52.
Matrix	Supergirl	New Titans #121 (May 1995)	First appeared in Superman #16.
Rose Wilson	Ravager	New Titans #122 (Jun. 1995)	Daughter of Deathstroke and younger half-sister of Jericho.; Team member during one-year gap. Rejoins team in Teen Titans #88.; First appeared in Deathstroke the Terminator #15.; Incorporated into the New 52.
Jarras Minion	Minion	New Titans #123 (Jul. 1995)	First appeared in New Titans #114.; Disappeared during the New 52.

=== The Atom Titans ===
Character	Alias(es)	Joined	Notes
Ray Palmer	Atom	Teen Titans #1 (Oct. 1996)	First appeared in Showcase #34.; Incorporated into the New 52.
Toni Monetti	Argent	Teen Titans #1 (Oct. 1996)	Team member during one-year gap.; Disappeared during the New 52.
Cody Driscoll	Risk	Teen Titans #1 (Oct. 1996)	Member of Titans East.; Reintroduced in Dark Nights: Death Metal.; Died in Nightwing #89.
Isaiah Crockett	Slagger, Joto, Hot Spot	Teen Titans #1 (Oct. 1996)	Team member during one-year gap.; Had become Hot Spot by Teen Titans #38.; Reintroduced in Dark Nights: Death Metal.
Audrey Spears	Prysm	Teen Titans #1 (Oct. 1996)	Reintroduced in Dark Nights: Death Metal.
Freddy Freeman	Captain Marvel Jr., CM3	Teen Titans #17 (Feb. 1998)	
Fringe		Teen Titans #17 (Feb. 1998)	First appeared in Teen Titans vol 2 #4.

=== The Titans ===
Character	Alias(es)	Joined	Notes
Jesse Chambers	Jesse Quick	Titans Secret Files and Origins #1 (Mar. 1999)	Daughter of Johnny Quick and Liberty Belle.; First appeared in Justice Society of America #1.; Reintroduced post-DC Rebirth.

=== Teen Titans Post-"Graduation Day" ===
Character	Alias(es)	Joined	Notes
Tim Drake	Robin, Red Robin	Teen Titans #1 (Aug. 2003)	Adoptive son of Batman and younger adoptive brother of Nightwing and Red Hood.; First appeared in Batman #436.; Resigned from the team in Teen Titans #66. Rejoined the team as Red Robin in Teen Titans #92.; Incorporated into the New 52.
Cassie Sandsmark	Wonder Girl	Teen Titans #1 (Aug. 2003)	Demigod daughter of Zeus.; First appeared in Wonder Woman #105.; Incorporated into the New 52.
Kon-El	Superboy	Teen Titans #1 (Aug. 2003)	Clone of Superman and Lex Luthor.; First appeared in Adventures of Superman #500.; Died in Infinite Crisis #6. Resurrected in Final Crisis: Legion of 3 Worlds #4.; Reintroduced post-DC Rebirth.
Mia Dearden	Speedy	Teen Titans #21 (Apr. 2005)	Ward of Green Arrow.; First appeared in Green Arrow #2.; Reintroduced post-New 52.
Zachary Zatara	Zatara	Before Teen Titans #38 (Sep. 2006)	Team member during one-year gap.; Nephew of Zatara and cousin of Zatanna.; First appeared in Teen Titans #34.; Reintroduced post-DC Rebirth.
Luke O'Brien	Offspring	Before Teen Titans #38 (Sep. 2006)	Team member during one-year gap.; Son of Plastic Man.; First appeared in JLA #65.; Reintroduced post-DC Rebirth.
Dawn Granger	Dove	Before Teen Titans #38 (Sep. 2006)	Team member during one-year gap.; Sister of Hawk.; First appeared in Hawk and Dove #1.; Incorporated into the New 52.
M'gann M'orzz	Miss Martian	Before Teen Titans #38 (Sep. 2006)	Team member during one-year gap.; Rejoined in Teen Titans #69.; First appeared in Teen Titans #37.; Incorporated into the New 52.
Amy Allen	Bombshell	Before Teen Titans #38 (Sep. 2006)	Team member during one-year gap.; First appeared in Teen Titans #39.; Died in Teen Titans #43. Resurrected in Teen Titans #63.; Disappeared during the New 52.
Quinn Nash	Enigma	Before Teen Titans #38 (Sep. 2006)	Team member during one-year gap.; Also a member of Titans East.; Daughter of Riddler.; Died in Batman #712.; Reintroduced post-Dawn of DC.
Amon Tomaz	Osiris	Before Teen Titans #38 (Sep. 2006)	First appeared in 52 #23.; Died in 52 #43.; Resurrected in Blackest Night #8.; Died again during the New 52.
Wendy Harris, Marvin Harris, and Wonder Dog		Teen Titans #34 (May 2006)	Wendy and Marvin are the children of Calculator. They were the caretakers of Titans Tower during the one-year gap.; First appeared as friends Wendy Harris and Marvin White on Super Friends. First comic appearance was in Limited Collectors' Edition #C-41.; Marvin died and Wendy was paralyzed in Teen Titans #62.; Wendy became Proxy in Batgirl #12.; Wendy and Marvin disappeared during the New 52. Wonder Dog reappeared during Dawn of DC.
Eddie Bloomberg	Red Devil	Teen Titans #34 (May 2006)	Team member during one-year gap.; First appeared in Firestorm #24.; Died in Teen Titans #74.; Reintroduced post-New 52.
Kara Zor-El	Supergirl	Teen Titans #50 (Sep. 2007)	Paternal cousin of Superman.; First appeared in Action Comics #252.; Incorporated into the New 52.
Jaime Reyes	Blue Beetle	Teen Titans #61 (May 2008)	Left team in Teen Titans #83.; First appeared in Infinite Crisis #3.; Incorporated into the New 52.
Virgil Hawkins	Static	Teen Titans #69 (Jun. 2009)	Left team in Teen Titans #87.; First appeared in Static #1.; Reintroduced post-DC Rebirth.
Christopher Freeman	Kid Eternity	Teen Titans #69 (Jun. 2009)	First appeared in Hit Comics #25.; Kidnapped by Calculator in Teen Titans #73. Subsequent death revealed in Batgirl #12.; Reintroduced post-New 52.
Kaldur'ahm	Aqualad	Teen Titans #88 (Nov. 2010)	Joins in a flashforward.; First appeared in Young Justice. First comic appearance was in Brightest Day #4.; Incorporated into DC Rebirth.
Damian Wayne	Robin	Teen Titans #89 (Dec. 2010)	Left team in Teen Titans #92.; Son of Batman and Talia al Ghul.; First appeared in Batman: Son of the Demon.; Died in Batman Incorporated #7. Resurrected in Batman and Robin #37 during the New 52.
Kiran Singh	Solstice	Teen Titans #93 (Jan. 2011)	First appeared in Teen Titans #88.; Incorporated into the New 52.

== Ancillary teams ==
=== Titans West ===
Character	Alias(es)	Joined	Notes
Ch'al Andar	Golden Eagle	Teen Titans #50 (Oct. 1977)	First appeared as Charley Parker in Justice League of America #116.; Reintroduced post-DC Rebirth.

=== Team Titans ===
Character	Alias(es)	Joined	Notes
Miriam Delgado	Mirage	New Titans #79 (Sep. 1991)	Team member during one-year gap. Later a member of the main team.; Reintroduced in Dark Nights: Death Metal.
Tara Markov (imposter)	Terra	New Titans #79 (Sep. 1991)	Team member during one-year gap. Later a member of the main team. Also a member of Titans L.A.; Clone of Terra.; Died in World War III #3.
Carrie Levine	Redwing	New Titans #79 (Sep. 1991)	Sister of Prestor Jon.; Erased from history in Zero Hour.
Dagon	Nightrider	New Titans #79 (Sep. 1991)	Erased from history in Zero Hour.
Charlie Watkins	Killowat	New Titans #79 (Sep. 1991)	Erased from history in Zero Hour.
Jonathan Levine	Prestor Jon	New Titans #79 (Sep. 1991)	Brother of Redwing.; Erased from history in Zero Hour.
Alexander Lyons	Battalion	Team Titans #2 (Oct. 1992)	Erased from history in Zero Hour.
Wonder Boy		Team Titans #19 (Apr. 1994)	Erased from history in Zero Hour.

=== Titans L.A. ===
Character	Alias(es)	Joined	Notes
Hero Cruz	Hero	Titans Secret Files and Origins #2 (Oct. 2000)	First appeared in Superboy and the Ravers #1.; Disappeared during the New 52.
Ryuku Orsono	Bushido	Titans Secret Files and Origins #2 (Oct. 2000)	First appeared in Titans Annual #1.; Died in Infinite Crisis #4.

=== Titans East ===
Character	Identity	Issue joined	Notes
Anima	Courtney Mason	Titans East Special #1 (January 2008, one-off issue)	Killed in Faces of Evil: Prometheus one-shot.
Hawk	Holly Granger	Titans East Special #1 (January 2008, one-off issue)	Team member during one-year gap.; Killed in Blackest Night: Titans #1.; Active as Black Lantern in Blackest Night: Titans #2.; Destroyed in Blackest Night: Titans #3, reintroduced in New 52 relaunch of 2011.
Dove	Dawn Granger	Titans East Special #1 (January 2008, one-off issue)	Team member during one-year gap.; Active in the Birds of Prey
Lagoon Boy		Titans East Special #1 (January 2008, one-off issue)	Left in a coma at end of Titans East Special, reintroduced in New 52 relaunch of 2011.
Little Barda		Titans East Special #1 (January 2008, one-off issue)	Team member during one-year gap.; Left in critical condition at end of Titans East Special, returned to action in Titans #21 (March 2010)
Power Boy		Titans East Special #1 (January 2008, one-off issue)	Team member during one-year gap.; Killed in Titans East Special.
Son of Vulcan	Miguel Devante	Titans East Special #1 (January 2008, one-off issue)	Left in a coma at end of Titans East Special, reintroduced in New 52 relaunch of 2011.
Cyborg	Victor Stone	Titans East Special #1 (January 2008, one-off issue)	Former member of the main team.; Team leader.

=== Deathstroke's Titans ===
Character	Identity	Issue joined	Notes
Cinder	Carla Moretti	Titans: Villains For Hire Special	Pyrokinetic supervillainess created specifically for the series
Cheshire	Jade Nguyen	Titans: Villains For Hire Special	Former member of Injustice League.; Former member of Secret Society of Super Villains.; Former member of the Ravens.; Former member of Secret Six
Deathstroke	Slade Wilson	Titans: Villains For Hire Special	Former member of Secret Society of Super Villains.; Former member of Injustice League.; Former member of Titans East.; Team leader.
Osiris	Amon Tomaz	Titans: Villains For Hire Special	Team member during one-year gap.; Killed by Sobek in 52 #43.; Restored to life in Blackest Night #8.
Tattooed Man	Mark Richards	Titans: Villains For Hire Special	Former member of Secret Society of Super Villains.; Former honorary member of Justice League of America.
Arsenal	Roy Harper	Titans Vol. 2 #28	Former member of Teen Titans, the Justice League of America, Suicide Squad, Outsiders, Checkmate, and the Outlaws.

== The New 52 / DC Rebirth ==
=== "Forgotten" Teen Titans ===
Character	Real name	Joined in	Notes
Aqualad	Garth		Founding member; confirmed to be a part of the team in Titans Hunt (vol. 1) #4; forgotten by the world after Mister Twister's actions
Beast Boy	Garfield Logan		Confirmed to be a part of the team in The Flash (vol. 5) Annual #1; forgotten by the world after Mister Twister's actions
Cyborg	Victor Stone		Confirmed to be a part of the team in The Flash (vol. 5) Annual #1; forgotten by the world after Mister Twister's actions
Cave Boy	Gnarrk		Confirmed to be a part of the team in Titans Hunt (vol. 1) #4; forgotten by the world after Mister Twister's actions
Dove	Don Hall		Confirmed to be a part of the team in Titans Hunt (vol. 1) #8; forgotten by the world after Mister Twister's actions
Flamebird	Bette Kane		Confirmed to have been part of the team during the original printing of Batwoman (vol. 1) #1 but retconned when collected in the trade paperback; confirmed to have been part of the team in Dark Nights: Death Metal: The Last Stories of the DC Multiverse; leader of the Titans West
Hawk	Hank Hall		Confirmed to be a part of the team in Titans Hunt (vol. 1) #4; forgotten by the world after Mister Twister's actions; member of Titans West
Herald	Malcolm Duncan		Confirmed to be a part of the team in Titans Hunt (vol. 1) #4; forgotten by the world after Mister Twister's actions
Hot Spot	Isaiah Crockett		Confirmed to be a part of the team in Sideways (vol. 1) #4; forgotten by the world after Mister Twister's actions
Kid Flash	Wally West		Founding member; confirmed to be a part of the team in DC Universe: Rebirth (vol. 1) #1; forgotten by the world after Mister Twister's actions
Magenta	Frances Kane		Confirmed to be a part of the team in The Flash (vol. 5) Annual #1; forgotten by the world after Mister Twister's actions
Omen	Lilith Clay		Founding member; confirmed to be a part of the team in Titans Hunt (vol. 1) #4; forgotten by the world after Mister Twister's actions
Ravager	Rose Wilson		Confirmed to be a part of the team in Deathstroke (vol. 4) #18; forgotten by the world after Mister Twister's actions
Robin	Dick Grayson		Founding member; former leader; confirmed to be a part of the team in Titans Hunt (vol. 1) #4; forgotten by the world after Mister Twister's actions
Speedy	Roy Harper		Founding member; confirmed to be a part of the team in Titans Hunt (vol. 1) #4; forgotten by the world after Mister Twister's actions
Starfire	Koriand'r		Confirmed to be a part of the team in The Flash (vol. 5) Annual #1; forgotten by the world after Mister Twister's actions
Terra	Tara Markov		Confirmed to be a part of the team in Deathstroke (vol. 4) #21; forgotten by the world after Mister Twister's actions
Wonder Girl	Donna Troy		Founding member; confirmed to be a part of the team in Titans Hunt (vol. 1) #4; forgotten by the world after Mister Twister's actions

=== Teen Titans (New 52) ===
Character	Real name	Joined in	Notes
Red Robin	Tim Drake	Teen Titans (vol. 4) #4	Founding member and leader of the Teen Titans. Former sidekick of Batman. Former member of Batman Inc. Currently active with the Bat family.
Wonder Girl	Cassandra Sandsmark	Teen Titans (vol. 4) #4	Revealed to be related to Wonder Woman in Vol. 4 #19.
Kid Flash	Bart Allen / Bar Torr	Teen Titans (vol. 4) #4	Left in Vol. 4 #30.
Skitter	Celine Patterson	Teen Titans (vol. 4) #4	Left in Vol. 4 #9, returned in #29, and left again in Annual Vol. 4 #3.
Bunker	Miguel Barragan	Teen Titans (vol. 4) #4	Left in Vol. 4 #24, and returned in Vol. 4 #30.
Solstice	Kiran Singh	Teen Titans (vol. 4) #4	Left in Vol. 4 #30.
Superboy	Kon-El	Teen Titans Annual (vol. 4) #1	Former Operative of N.O.W.H.E.R.E.. Presumed dead in Superman (vol. 3) #25. Revealed to be the Herald of the Oracle in Annual Vol. 4 #3.
Danny the Street	"Danny"	Teen Titans (vol. 4) #7	Destroyed in Vol. 4 #10. Currently active in the Doom Patrol as Danny the Ambulance.
Beast Boy	Garfield Logan	Teen Titans (vol. 4) #23	Former member of the new Teen Titans. Currently active in the Titans.
Raven	Rachel Roth	Teen Titans (vol. 4) #23	Former member of the new Teen Titans. Currently active in the Titans.
Superboy	Jon Lane Kent	Teen Titans Annual (vol. 4) #2	Died in Superboy (vol. 6) #34
Chimera	Ra'ut L'lwer	DC Sneak Peek Teen Titans (vol. 5) # 1	Left in Vol. 5 #16.
Power Girl	Tanya Spears	Teen Titans (vol. 5) #5	Former member of Defiance.

=== Teen Titans (DC Rebirth) ===
Character	Real name	Joined in	Notes
Robin	Damian Wayne	Teen Titans (vol. 6) #1	Founding member. Former leader of the Teen Titans. Left in Teen Titans (vol. 6) Annual #2. Former member of Batman Inc. Also active with the Bat family.
Starfire	Koriand'r	Teen Titans (vol. 6) #1	Founding member. Left the team between Teen Titans (vol. 6) #19 and Teen Titans (vol. 6) Special #1. Currently active in the Titans.
Raven	Rachel Roth	Teen Titans (vol. 6) #1	Founding member. Left the team between Teen Titans (vol. 6) #19 and Teen Titans (vol. 6) Special #1. Former member of the original Teen Titans. Currently active in the Titans.
Beast Boy	Garfield Logan	Teen Titans (vol. 6) #1	Founding member. Left the team in #17. Former member of the original Teen Titans. Currently active in the Titans.
Kid Flash	Ace West	Teen Titans (vol. 6) #1	Founding member. Active. Left the team in Annual Vol. 6 #1, and rejoined in issue #14. Former member of Defiance. Active with the Flash family.
Aqualad	Jackson Hyde	Teen Titans (vol. 6) #7	Left the team between Teen Titans (vol. 6) #19 and Teen Titans (vol. 6) Special #1.
Superboy	Jon Kent	Super Sons (vol. 1) #7	Voted against as an official member of the team in Super Sons #12. Currently active with the Super family.
Red Arrow	Emiko Queen	Teen Titans (vol. 6) #20	Active with the Arrow family.
Djinn		Teen Titans (vol. 6) #20	Left the team in Teen Titans (vol. 6) #41
Roundhouse	Billy Wu	Teen Titans (vol. 6) #20	
Crush	Xiomara Rojas	Teen Titans (vol. 6) #20	Leader of the Teen Titans as of Teen Titans (vol. 6) #45. Quits team in Teen Titans Academy #3.
Bunker	Miguel Barragan	Teen Titans Academy (vol. 1) #1	Team leader as of Teen Titans Academy #3.
Jakeem Thunder	Jakeem Williams	Teen Titans Academy (vol. 1) #1	Active.
Red Hood	Jason Todd	Teen Titans (vol. 7) #1	Active. Field leader of the Teen Titans.
Cheshire Cat	Lian Harper	Teen Titans (vol. 7) #1	Active.
Wildcard	Jett Blitz	Teen Titans (vol. 7) #1	Active.
Proxy	Ezra Calder	Teen Titans (vol. 7) #1	Active.
Eugene Choi		Teen Titans (vol. 7) #1	Active.
Fairplay	Jeffrey "PJ" Holt	Teen Titans (vol. 7) #1	Active.

=== Titans (DC Rebirth) ===
Character	Real name	Joined in	Notes
Nightwing	Dick Grayson	Titans (vol. 3) Rebirth #1	Founding member. Left the team when shot through the head by KGBeast in Batman (vol. 3) #50, which caused him to develop amnesia. Rejoined prior to Teen Titans (vol. 6) #47. Current leader of the Titans. Formerly Robin. Former member of Batman Inc. Active with the Bat family.
Donna Troy	Donna Troy	Titans (vol. 3) Rebirth #1	Founding member. Active. Formerly Wonder Girl.
The Flash	Wally West	Titans (vol. 3) Rebirth #1	Founding member. Formerly Kid Flash. Left between Titans (vol. 3) #22 and Titans (vol. 3) Special #1. Currently active with the Flash family. Rejoins in Teen Titans Academy (vol. 1) #13.
Tempest	Garth	Titans (vol. 3) Rebirth #1	Founding member. Formerly Aqualad. Left between Titans (vol. 3) #22 and Titans (vol. 3) Special #1. Rejoins in Teen Titans Academy (vol. 1) #12. Left again prior to Titans (vol. 4) #1.
Arsenal	Roy Harper	Titans (vol. 3) Rebirth #1	Founding member. Formerly Speedy. Left between Titans (vol. 3) #22 and Titans (vol. 3) Special #1. Rejoins in Teen Titans Academy (vol. 1) #9. Left again prior to Titans (vol. 4) #1
Omen	Lilith Clay	Titans (vol. 3) Rebirth #1	Founding member. Left between Titans (vol. 3) #22 and Titans (vol. 3) Special #1.
Bumblebee	Karen Beecher-Duncan	Titans (vol. 3) #9	Left between Titans (vol. 3) #22 and Titans (vol. 3) Special #1.
Beast Boy	Garfield Logan	Titans (vol. 3) Special #1	Active. Former member of the Teen Titans. Merges with Cyborg to become Cybeast in Teen Titans Academy (vol. 1) #14. Recovers sometime before Dark Crisis.
Raven	Rachel Roth	Titans (vol. 3) Special #1	Active.
Steel	Natasha Irons	Titans (vol. 3) Special #1	Left the team prior to Teen Titans (vol. 6) #47.
Miss Martian	M'gann M'orzz	Titans (vol. 3) Special #1	Liaison with the Justice League. Left the team prior to Teen Titans (vol. 6) #47.
Green Lantern	Kyle Rayner	Titans (vol. 3) #31	Left the team prior to Teen Titans (vol. 6) #47.
Starfire	Koriand'r	Teen Titans (vol. 6) #47	Active
Cyborg	Victor Stone	Teen Titans (vol. 6) #47	Active. Merges with Beast Boy to become Cybeast in Teen Titans Academy #14. Recovers sometime before Dark Crisis.
Bunker	Miguel Barragan	Teen Titans Academy #14	Left the team prior to Titans (vol. 4) #1.
Kid Flash	Ace West	Teen Titans Academy #14	Left the team prior to Titans (vol. 4) #1.
Red Arrow	Emiko Queen	Teen Titans Academy #14	Left the team prior to Titans (vol. 4) #1.
Roundhouse	Billy Wu	Teen Titans Academy #14	Left the team prior to Titans (vol. 4) #1.
Aquaman	Jackson Hyde	The Flash #786	Left the team prior to Titans (vol. 4) #1.
Nightbuster	Olivia Desmond	Nightwing (vol. 4) #104	Honorary member.
Swamp Thing	Levi Kamei	Titans (vol. 4) #5	Reserve member.
Vanadia		Titans (vol. 4) #23	Initially betrays team to Deathstroke's Crime Syndicate, but rejoins the Titans afterward.
Batgirl	Stephanie Brown	New Titans (vol. 2) #33	
Red Devil	Eddie Bloomberg	New Titans (vol. 2) #33	
Superman	Jon Kent	New Titans (vol. 2) #33	
Wonder Girl	Yara Flor	New Titans (vol. 2) #33	
Eva the Daughter of Tomorrow	Eva	New Titans (vol. 2) #34	
Terra	Tara Markov	New Titans (vol. 2) #36	
Static	Virgil Hawkins	New Titans (vol. 2) #38	

=== Defiance (Deathstroke's Titans) ===
Character	Real name	Joined in	Notes
Deathstroke	Slade Wilson	Deathstroke (vol. 4) #21	Founder and leader of Defiance. Killed in Dark Crisis on Infinite Earths #7.
Jericho	Joseph Wilson	Deathstroke (vol. 4) #21	Founding member.
Ravager	Rose Wilson	Deathstroke (vol. 4) #21	Founding member.
Terra	Tara Markov	Deathstroke (vol. 4) #21	Founding member.
Power Girl	Tanya Spears	Deathstroke (vol. 4) #21	Founding member. Former member of the Teen Titans.
Kid Flash	Ace West	Deathstroke (vol. 4) #21	Founding member. Former member of the Teen Titans.

=== Titans Academy ===
Character	Real name	Joined in	Notes
Black Ice	Summer Zahid	Infinite Frontier #0	
Bolt	Alinta	Infinite Frontier #0	
Bratgirl	Merissa Cooper	Infinite Frontier #0	
Gorilla Gregg	Gorilla Gregg	Infinite Frontier #0	Quits in Dark Crisis #2.
Jakeem Thunder	Jakeem Williams	Infinite Frontier #0	Currently active in the Teen Titans.
Matt Price	Matthew Price	Infinite Frontier #0	
Megabat	Lucas LaPorte	Infinite Frontier #0	
Red X	Brick Pettirosso	Infinite Frontier #0	Foster son of Red X who enters Titans Academy to destroy the Titans. Killed in Teen Titans Academy #12.
Tooby	Marvin Murakami	Infinite Frontier #0	
Bunker	Miguel Barragan	Teen Titans Academy #1	Former leader of the Teen Titans. Graduated in Teen Titans Academy #14.
Chupacabra	Diego Perez	Teen Titans Academy #1	
Crush	Xiomara Rojas	Teen Titans Academy #1	Former leader of Teen Titans. Quits in Teen Titans Academy #3.
Dial H	Miguel Montez	Teen Titans Academy #1	
Kid Flash	Ace West	Teen Titans Academy #1	Graduates in Teen Titans Academy #14.
Nevermore	Dane (surname unknown)	Teen Titans Academy #1	
Red Arrow	Emiko Queen	Teen Titans Academy #1	Graduates in Teen Titans Academy #14.
Roundhouse	Billy Wu	Teen Titans Academy #1	Graduates in Teen Titans Academy #14.
Shazam	Billy Batson	Teen Titans Academy #1	
Stitch		Teen Titans Academy #1	
Cybruh	Addison (surname unknown)	Teen Titans Academy #2	Originally from Earth-12.
Joely Webster	Joely Webster	Teen Titans Academy #2	Dies in Teen Titans Academy #10.
Tress	Unknown	Teen Titans Academy #2	
Mark Radley		Teen Titans Academy #4	Dies in Teen Titans Academy #10.
Black Adam Jr.	Teth-Adam	Teen Titans Academy #15	Originally from the Future State timeline.
The Hound	Lebowitz	Teen Titans Academy #15	Whistle's dog.
Primer	Ashley Rayburn	Teen Titans Academy #15	
Whistle	Willow Zimmerman	Teen Titans Academy #15	

=== Titans West ===
Character	Real name	Joined in	Notes
Bumblebee	Karen Beecher-Duncan	DC's Legion of Bloom #1	Founding member of the first Teen Titans; confirmed to be a part of the first Teen Titans team in Titans Hunt (vol. 1) #4; forgotten by the world after Mister Twister's actions; former member of the DC Rebirth Titans; currently active as a member of the second Titans West
Dove	Don Hall	Dark Nights: Death Metal: The Last Stories of the DC Universe	Confirmed to be a part of the team in Titans Hunt (vol. 1) #4; Confirmed to be part of the first iteration of Titans West in Dark Nights: Death Metal: The Last Stories of the DC Universe; forgotten by the world after Mister Twister's actions; deceased
Dove	Dove Granger	DC's Legion of Bloom #1	Allied with the reunited Titans in Titans Hunt (vol. 1) #4; member of second Titans West
Flamebird	Bette Kane	Dark Nights: Death Metal: The Last Stories of the DC Universe	Founding member of the first iteration of the Titans West; confirmed to have been part of the first Titans prior to Mister Twister's actions; currently active as the leader of the second iteration
Golden Eagle	Charley Parker (born Ch'al Andar)	Dark Nights: Death Metal: The Last Stories of the DC Universe	Confirmed to be part of the first iteration of Titans West in Dark Nights: Death Metal: The Last Stories of the DC Universe; retconned to have been mission control of the first Teen Titans in World's Finest: Teen Titans #1.
Hawk	Hank Hall	Dark Nights: Death Metal: The Last Stories of the DC Universe	Founding member of the first iteration of the Titans West; confirmed to have been part of the Teen Titans prior to Mister Twister's actions; currently active as a member of the second iteration
Omen	Lilith Clay	Dark Nights: Death Metal: The Last Stories of the DC Universe	Founding member and leader of the first iteration; former member of the DC Rebirth Titans

== Titans not in mainstream continuity ==
=== Kingdom Come & The Kingdom ===
The Kingdom Come Titans first appeared in 1996.

Character	Identity	Issue joined	Notes
Batman	Dick Grayson	Kingdom Come #1	Team leader.; Returned as Batman after Kingdom Come.
Wonder Girl	Donna Troy	Kingdom Come #1	Returned as Troia after Kingdom Come.
Flash	Wally West	Kingdom Come #1	His costume from Kingdom Come is similar to Jay Garrick's costume.
Aquaman	Garth	Kingdom Come #1	Became Tempest after Kingdom Come.
Red Arrow	Roy Harper	Kingdom Come #1	Second-in-command.
Nightstar	Mar'i Grayson	Kingdom Come #1	Daughter of Nightwing/Dick Grayson and Starfire.
Kid Flash	Iris West	Kingdom Come #1	Second Kid Flash in non-canon.

=== Titans Tomorrow ===
The Titans Tomorrow team is a future, anti-hero version of the Teen Titans and was first seen in 2005. The group, which is from "10 years in the future," first appeared prior to Infinite Crisis in the Titans Tomorrow storyline.

==== Titans West ====
Character	Identity	Issue joined	Notes
Batman	Tim Drake	Teen Titans (vol. 3) #17	Team leader.
Flash	Bart Allen	Teen Titans (vol. 3) #17	Traitor to Titans East.
Superman	Conner Kent / Kon-El	Teen Titans (vol. 3) #17	Influenced by Lex Luthor.
Wonder Woman	Cassandra Sandsmark	Teen Titans (vol. 3) #17	
Dark Raven	Raven	Teen Titans (vol. 3) #17	Member of the Titans Army.
Animal Man	Garfield Logan	Teen Titans (vol. 3) #17	Member of the Titans Army.
Aquawoman	Lorena Marquez	Teen Titans (vol. 3) #17	Member of the Titans Army.
Flash	"Bart Allen"	Teen Titans (vol. 3) #50	Clone of Bart Allen.
Superman	"Conner Kent / Kon-El"	Teen Titans (vol. 3) #50	Clone of Kon-El.
Martian Manhunter	M'gann M'orzz / Megan Morse	Teen Titans (vol. 3) #51	
Red Devil	Eddie Bloomberg	Teen Titans (vol. 3) #51	Servant of Neron.

==== Titans East ====
Character	Identity	Issue joined	Notes
Bumblebee	Karen Beecher	Teen Titans (vol. 3) #17	Member of Titans Army.; Co-leader.
Ravager	Rose Wilson	Teen Titans (vol. 3) #17	
Terra	Atlee	Teen Titans (vol. 3) #17	
Flash	Bart Allen	Teen Titans (vol. 3) #18	Spy in Titans West.
Cyborg	Victor Stone	Teen Titans (vol. 3) #18	Member of Titans Army.
Batwoman	Bette Kane	Teen Titans (vol. 3) #18	Teen *Team leader.: Member of Titans Army as Flamebird.

=== DC X Sonic the Hedgehog ===
The Titans are first mentioned in the first miniseries's third issue. They later make a full appearance in Metal Legion #1.

Character	Identity	Issue joined	Notes
Cyborg	Victor Stone	Before DC X Sonic the Hedgehog #1	Also a member of the Justice League
Beast Boy	Garfield Logan	Before DC X Sonic the Hedgehog #1	
Starfire	Koriand'r / Kory Anders	Before DC X Sonic the Hedgehog #1	
Robin	Damian Wayne	Before DC X Sonic the Hedgehog #1	
Raven	Rachel Roth	Before DC X Sonic the Hedgehog #1	
Cyborg	Miles "Tails" Prower	DC X Sonic the Hedgehog #3	Reserve member; Wears a suit of armor resembling Cyborg

== In other media ==
=== Teen Titans animated series ===
The main team consists of Robin (as leader), Beast Boy, Cyborg, Raven, and Starfire. They were joined by Terra for a brief period in the second season (she betrayed the Titans in the episode "Betrayal", but in "Aftershock Pt. 2" she sacrificed herself to save them and defeated Slade for the time being). Titans East was formed at the end of the third season with Bumblebee (as leader), along with Aqualad, Más y Menos, and Speedy. Several Titans were given honorary membership over the course of the series, with all of them appearing in the episode "Calling all Titans".

Character	Episode joined	Notes
Robin	"Go!"	The leader of the Teen Titans.
Cyborg	"Go!"	Temporary leader of Titans East.
Beast Boy	"Go!"	Former member of the Doom Patrol.
Raven	"Go!"	
Starfire	"Go!"	
Thunder and Lightning	"Forces of Nature"	Thunder and Lightning are former enemies of the Titans who became their allies.
Aqualad	"Deep Six"	Titans East member.
Tramm	"Deep Six"	Aqualad's partner.
Terra	"Titan Rising"	Terra is a former member of the Teen Titans who worked as a double agent for Slade. She later turns on Slade, sacrificing herself to save the city.
Speedy	"Winner Take All"	Titans East member.
Hot Spot	"Winner Take All"	Honorary Titan.
Wildebeest	"Winner Take All"	Honorary Titan.
Bumblebee	"Wavelength"	Titans East leader.
Más y Menos	"Titans East"	Titans East members.
Red Star	"Snowblind"	
Kole	"Kole"	
Gnarrk	"Kole"	
Melvin, Timmy Tantrum, Bobby, and Teether	"Hide and Seek"	
Kid Flash	"Lightspeed"	
Wonder Girl	Before "Calling All Titans"	Makes full appearance in Teen Titans Go! #36.
Killowat	Before "Calling All Titans"	
Argent	"Calling All Titans"	
Bushido	"Calling All Titans"	
Herald	"Calling All Titans"	
Jericho	"Calling All Titans"	
Pantha	"Calling All Titans"	
Jinx	Before "Titans Together"	A former enemy of the Teen Titans who later becomes their ally.

=== DCAU ===
Character	Identity	Status	Notes
Changeling	Garfield Logan	Unknown	Referenced in Static Shock and Teen Titans Academy.
Cyborg	Victor Stone	Inactive	Active in the Justice League.
Green Lantern	Kyle Rayner	Inactive	
Nightwing	Dick Grayson	Inactive	
Robin	Tim Drake	Active	
Starfire	Koriand'r	Inactive	Active in Justice League Beyond.

=== Injustice series ===
Character	Identity	Status	Notes
Beast Boy	Garfield Logan	Inactive (Regime Earth)	Deceased.
Cyborg	Victor Stone	Active (Earth One) Inactive (Regime Earth)	Also a member of the Justice League (Earth One); Also a member of the Justice League Task Force (Regime Earth)
Kid Flash	Bart Allen	Inactive (Regime Earth)	Deceased.
Nightwing	Richard "Dick" Grayson	Active (Earth One) Inactive (Regime Earth)	Also a member of the Justice League (Earth One); Former leader (Regime Earth); Deceased (Regime Earth)
Raven		Active (Earth One) Inactive (Regime Earth)	Also a member of the Justice League (Earth One)
Red Arrow	Roy Harper	Inactive (Regime Earth)	
Red Robin	Timothy "Tim" Drake	Inactive (Regime Earth)	Former leader; Deceased
Starfire	Koriand'r	Inactive (Regime Earth)	Also a member of the Justice League Task Force (Regime Earth)
Superboy	Kon-El	Inactive (Regime Earth)	Also a member of the Justice League Task Force (Regime Earth)
Wonder Girl	Cassandra "Cassie" Sandsmark	Inactive (Regime Earth)	Also a member of the Justice League Task Force (Regime Earth)

=== DC Animated Movie Universe ===
Character	Identity	Film joined	Status	Notes
Robin / Nightwing	Richard "Dick" Grayson	Before Justice League vs. Teen Titans	Active	Former leader; Killed by a Paradoom and resurrected by Damian Wayne in Justice League Dark: Apokolips War
Beast Boy	Garfield Logan	Before Justice League vs. Teen Titans	Active	Killed by Paradooms in Justice League Dark: Apokolips War
Kid-Flash	Wally West	Before Justice League vs. Teen Titans	Active	Left before Justice League vs. Teen Titans.
Bumblebee	Karen Beecher	Before Justice League vs. Teen Titans	Active	Killed by Paradooms in Justice League Dark: Apokolips War
Speedy	Roy Harper	Before Justice League vs. Teen Titans	Active	Killed by Paradooms in Justice League Dark: Apokolips War
Starfire	Koriand'r	Before Justice League vs. Teen Titans	Active	Current leader; Killed by Paradooms and resurrected as a cyborg in Justice League Dark: Apokolips War
Raven	Rachel Roth	Before Justice League vs. Teen Titans	Active	
Blue Beetle	Jaime Reyes	Before Justice League vs. Teen Titans	Active	Killed by Paradooms in Justice League Dark: Apokolips War
Robin	Damian Wayne	Justice League vs. Teen Titans	Active	Killed by Darkseid and resurrected by Raven in Justice League Dark: Apokolips War
Cyborg	Victor Stone	Justice League vs. Teen Titans	Inactive	Member of Justice League; Temporarily joined the team to stop Trigon-controlled Justice League; Killed battling Darkseid in Justice League Dark: Apokolips War.
Terra	Terra Markov	After Justice League vs. Teen Titans	Inactive	Later discovered to be Deathstroke's mole.; Died in Teen Titans: The Judas Contract.
Wonder Girl	Donna Troy	Teen Titans: The Judas Contract.	Active	Killed by Paradooms in Justice League Dark: Apokolips War
Superboy	Conner Kent	After Reign of the Supermen.	Active	Killed by Paradooms in Justice League Dark: Apokolips War
Kid Flash	Wallace West	Before Justice League Dark: Apokolips War.	Active	Killed by Paradooms in Justice League Dark: Apokolips War

=== Titans series ===
In order of joining the team, then order of appearance in the series.

Character	Identity	Actor	Episode first joined	Status	Notes
Robin / Nightwing	Richard "Dick" Grayson	Brenton Thwaites	5+ years before 1x01 "Pilot"	Active	Member of the original team; Leader
Dove	Dawn Granger	Minka Kelly	5+ years before 1x01 "Pilot"	Inactive	Member of the original team; Left team in 3x04 "Blackfire" following Hank's death
Hawk	Hank Hall	Alan Ritchson	5+ years before 1x01 "Pilot"	Inactive	Deceased; Killed by Red Hood in 3x03 "Hank and Dove"
Wonder Girl	Donna Troy	Conor Leslie	5+ years before 1x01 "Pilot"	Inactive	Member of the original team; Deceased; killed in action in 2x13 "Nightwing"; Resurrected in 3x09 "Souls"; Temporarily rejoined in 3x13 "Purple Rain" before leaving to visit Dawn in Paris
Aqualad	Garthe	Drew Van Acker	5+ years before 1x01 "Pilot"	Inactive	Member of the original team; Deceased; fatally shot by Deathstroke in 2x04 "Aqualad"
Raven	Rachel Roth	Teagan Croft	2x01 "Trigon"	Active	Left in 2x13 "Nightwing"; looking for a way to revive Wonder Girl; Rejoined in 3x10 "Troubled Water"
Beast Boy	Garfield Logan	Ryan Potter	2x01 "Trigon"	Active	Former member of Doom Patrol
Robin / Red Hood	Jason Todd	Curran Walters	2x01 "Trigon"	Inactive	Left in 2x09 "Atonement"; Killed by Joker in 3x01 "Barbara Gordon"; Resurrected by Scarecrow and operating as Red Hood as of 3x02 "Red Hood"
Ravager	Rose Wilson	Chelsea Zhang	2x03 "Ghosts"	Inactive	Also a host for Jericho's conscious; Initially Deathstroke's mole; Current status unknown as of 3x01 "Barbara Gordon"
Starfire	Koriand'r / Kory Anders	Anna Diop	2x13 "Nightwing"	Active	
Jericho	Jericho Wilson	Chella Man	2x13 "Nightwing"	Inactive	Jericho possessed Deathstroke's body for some time, then possessed Rose to save himself after Rose stabbed Deathstroke.; Current status unknown as of 3x01 "Barbara Gordon"
Superboy	Subject 13 / Conner	Joshua Orpin	2x13 "Nightwing"	Active	
Krypto		Pepsi, Wrigley, and Ziva	2x13 "Nightwing"	Active	
Blackfire	Komand'r	Damaris Lewis	3x06 "Lady Vic"	Inactive	Left in 3x13 "Purple Rain" to return to Tamaran
Robin	Tim Drake	Jay Lycurgo	3x13 "Purple Rain"	Active	
