= List of Teen Titans comics =

Various superhero groups by the name Teen Titans (or similar variants) have been published in comic books by DC Comics since 1964.

== Comics publication history ==
=== Teen Titans (1964–1978) ===
The first incarnation of the group unofficially debuted in The Brave and the Bold #54 (July 1964), before appearing as "The Teen Titans" in #60, and again in Showcase #59 (December 1965). These appearances led to a comic of the same name (debuting with a cover date of February 1966) which ran until 1972/1973, when it was cancelled with issue #43. Briefly revived in 1976 for a further 10 issues, the series was again cancelled after #53 told the team's origin for the first time.

==== Key team ====
The original Teen Titans team consisted of the sidekicks to DC's Batman, Flash, and Aquaman — the first Robin, Kid Flash, and Aqualad. They were joined in their second appearance by Wonder Girl, erroneously presented as Wonder Woman's sidekick. (Note: Wonder Girl was initially a teenage version of Diana/Wonder Woman, so the discrepancy was "cleared up" through the creation of the character Donna Troy. She has subsequently undergone a plethora of revisions and identity crises, to be retro-fitted into subsequent continuities. As a result, she has become something of a Crisis-nexus, playing a key role in DC's Infinite Crisis and related titles and events.)

=== New Teen Titans (1980–1988) ===
(Becomes Tales of the Teen Titans with #41)

The series was relaunched with the prefix "New" in an issue cover-dated November 1980. Written by Marv Wolfman with art by George Pérez, both of whom had recently moved to DC from Marvel, this incarnation (and these creators) would prove to be arguably the best-known and most-popular comics incarnation of the Titans teams. The book took on "modern sensibilities," and addressed a number of hard-hitting issues, including a memorable couple of special anti-drugs issues.

Previewed in DC Comics Presents #26, the New Teen Titans series ran for 40 issues (until March 1984), before changing title to Tales of the Teen Titans between issues #41 and #91. To capitalise on the series' success, DC launched a separate New Teen Titans title concurrent to the renamed Tales... title on better-quality paper. After several months featuring twice as many new Titans stories, Tales of the Teen Titans #59 turned that title into a reprint comic, with #60–91 reprinting the second series at a delay of about 15 months from issue #1–32 under new covers. The reprint title eventually floundered and was cancelled in July 1988.

==== Key team ====
No longer restricted solely to sidekicks to existing heroes, the Titans team branched out and included key heroes such as the college-aged Cyborg, Starfire, Beast Boy, and Raven.

=== New Teen Titans vol. 2 (1984–1996) ===
(Becomes The New Titans with #50)

The second New Teen Titans series ran for 49 issues between August 1984 and November 1988, whereupon it was also retitled, becoming simply The New Titans with issue #50, under which title it continued for another 80 issues until February 1996. Initially featuring the same Wolfman/Pérez creative team as the first series, the artist left after issue #5 to return to art duties (and as co-writer) for 11 issues starting with the change of title and the five-issue "Who is Wonder Girl?" arc in The New Titans #50–54 (December 1988 – March 1989).

=== Teen Titans Spotlight On (1986–1988) ===
With DC's Teen Titans comics rivaling Marvel's X-Men for popularity, another new title was launched, this time with the explicit purpose of highlighting individual Titans, rather than focusing on the team as a whole. With the stated remit (from the first comic) that, "Teen Titans Spotlight On: is a new concept in comics ... a book where we can put the spotlight on individual members of the Teen Titans, one at a time, and let each story dictate how many issues it should run." The series ran for 21 issues, departing slightly from its aim to highlight individuals, and culminating in a "Spotlight" on the 1960s Teen Titans team as a whole.

=== Team Titans (1992–1994) ===
As part of the "Titans Hunt" storyline in New Teen Titans vol. 2, a further Titans-related title was launched with a five-comic issue #1(a-e) in September 1992, featuring the time-displaced "Team Titans". This comic series ran concurrently to the New Teen Titans vol. 2 series, as the Team Titans crossed over both with that series and with Deathstroke. Teen Titans resources website TitansTower.com quotes writer/artist Phil Jimenez as saying that this series was effectively DC's answer to X-Force, but wound up (under Jimenez) going in directions contrary to DC's vision and the Zero Hour crossover event, which led to the series' cancellation with issue #24 (September 1994), after the team's timeline was eradicated during the event.

=== Teen Titans vol. 2 (1996–1998) ===
Thirty years after the original Teen Titans series debut, and just nine months after the demise of The New Titans (New Teen Titans vol. 2), a new Titans series was launched (in October 1996) as the second Teen Titans-named series. The series was spearheaded by writer/penciller Dan Jurgens, who wrote and drew all twenty-four issues (with inks for the first 15 issues by Titans-favourite George Pérez). Although the name was the same, the team was radically different, but with ties to the previous incarnations — as well as a four-issue storyline reuniting the original team. The series ran for two years, until September 1998.

==== Young Justice (1998–2003) ====
September 1998 also saw the launch of writer Peter David's Teen Titans-esque title Young Justice, featuring the main DCU teenaged heroes the third Robin, the time-displaced Flash-descendant Impulse, and the cloned Superboy (with the later additions of Arrowette and the second Wonder Girl, among others).

=== The Titans (1999–2003) ===
By popular demand, the original Teen Titans team (now all older, and under new aliases) was given its own title once more in March 1999, after a three-issue (December 1998 – February 1999) mini-series teaming them with the JLA in JLA/Titans: The Technis Imperative, which "featured absolutely everyone that was ever a Titan, as they joined together to save Cyborg from alien influence." Following that mini-series (written by Devin Grayson and Phil Jimenez, with art by Jimenez), the new The Titans series debuted in March 1999, written by Grayson, with art initially by Mark Buckingham and Wade Von Grawbadger. Grayson left after 20 issues, and the series continued until issue #50 (April 2003), and the team reappeared in Judd Winick's July–August 2003 3-issue mini-series Titans/Young Justice: Graduation Day. This crossover, with the then-current (and Titans-like) Young Justice team, marked the dissolution of both the Young Justice and Titans teams, as well as the alleged death of Troia and the seemingly lasting death of Omen.

==== Outsiders vol. 3 (2003–2007) ====
The Graduation Day crossover marked the end of The Titans and Young Justice, but served as a launch point for two new series and teams, one of which was Winick's own Outsiders, which debuted in August 2003, and featured some former Titans (notably original Teen Titans Arsenal and Nightwing) in an "edgy, more grown up" series, which ran for 50 issues, until November 2007.

=== Teen Titans vol. 3 (2003–2011) ===
In addition to the more "adult"-oriented Outsiders series, the end of The Titans and the events of Titans/Young Justice: Graduation Day saw the debut of a third Teen Titans series, launched in September 2003 by writer Geoff Johns (who would write the first 45 issues, as well as sundry spin-offs), with artist Mike McKone for most of the first 23 issues. The series featured (and features) Titans old and new, including the core Young Justice team, whose Robin, Impulse, and Wonder Girl fill the shoes of original Titans' first Robin, Kid Flash, and Wonder Girl. The team was founded by other former-Titans Cyborg, Starfire, and Beast Boy, and continues to tie into most previous incarnations of the team in a number of ways. The series would run for 100 issues before ending in 2011.

=== Titans vol. 2 (2008–2011) ===
In June 2008, a new Titans title was launched to run alongside Teen Titans vol. 3, initially featuring a storyline based around an attack on all former Titans. The cover to issue #1 confirmed the inclusion of original Titans Nightwing, Starfire, Donna Troy, Flash, Cyborg, Beast Boy, and Raven. The series is written by Judd Winick, and features art by Joe Benitez and Victor Llamas. The first issue has art by Ian Churchill, but due to an injury he was unable to pencil the next three issues. The series would run for 38 issues before ending in 2011.

=== Teen Titans vol. 4 (2011–2014) ===
Teen Titans was relaunched in September 2011 with the New 52 reboot, with the new roster of Red Robin, Wonder Girl, Superboy, Kid Flash, Bunker, Solstice, and Skitter. The series was written by Scott Lobdell, with Brett Booth serving as lead artist from issues #1–16. The series would run for 36 issues before ending in May 2014.

==== Ravagers (2012–2013) ====
Following the events of "The Culling" crossover storyline, the spinoff title Ravagers began publication, written by Howard Mackie with art by Ian Churchill. The titular team consisted of Beast Boy, Caitlin Fairchild, Terra, Thunder and Lightning, and Ridge. The series would end after 13 issues.

=== Teen Titans vol. 5 (2014–2016) ===
In July 2014, Teen Titans would revert to #1 with a new creative team, being written by Will Pfeifer with art by Kenneth Rocafort, and a new roster featuring Red Robin, Wonder Girl, Bunker, Beast Boy, and Raven, later introducing Tanya Spears, the newest incarnation of Power Girl. The series would run for 24 issues before ending in September 2016.

=== Teen Titans vol. 6 (2016–2020) ===
With the DC Rebirth relaunch, Teen Titans would be rebooted yet again, being written by Benjamin Percy with art by Jonboy Meyers. The roster initially included Robin (Damian Wayne), Kid Flash (Wallace West), Beast Boy, Starfire, and Raven, with later notable additions including Crush, Roundhouse, and Aqualad (Jackson Hyde). The run would feature the storylines "The Lazarus Contract", "Super Sons of Tomorrow", and "The Terminus Agenda". The series would run for 47 issues before ending in November 2020.

== Other comics ==
The various Teen Titans comics series have crossed over with titles including Action Comics Weekly, Crisis on Infinite Earths (written and illustrated by the New Teen Titans creative team), Deathstroke (spun off into his own comic, but initially created as a Titans villain), Hawk and Dove, Infinity Inc., Omega Men, Outsiders, Young Justice, and Zero Hour: Crisis in Time!. In addition, various Titans have starred in their own comics, which occasionally had a bearing on Titans-related matters — these include (in particular) original Teen Titans Donna Troy and Dick Grayson in Darkstars and Nightwing, respectively, and more recent Titans Tim Drake, Bart Allen, and Superboy in Robin, Impulse, and Superboy, among many others.

Sundry one-shots, crossovers, and specials have also been published through the years. These include Annuals, Secret Files issues, and include notable issues such as:

- Marvel and DC Present: The Uncanny X-Men and The New Teen Titans #1 (1982)
- The New Teen Titans (Drug Awareness Specials) #1–3 (1983)
- Titans $ell-out! Special #1 (1992)
- Tempest #1–4 (1996–1997)
- Titans: Scissors, Paper, Stone (1997) (a manga-style Elseworlds title)
- Arsenal #1–4 (1998)
- Girlfrenzy: Donna Troy (1998)
- JLA/Titans: The Technis Imperative #1–3 (1998–1999)
- Beast Boy #1–4 (2000)
- Titans/Legion of Super-Heroes: Universe Ablaze #1–4 (2000)
- Titans/Young Justice: Graduation Day #1–3 (2003)
- Teen Titans/Legion Special #1 (2004)
- DC Special: The Return of Donna Troy #1–4 (2005)
- DC Special: Raven #1–5 (2008)
- DC Special: Cyborg #1–6 (2008)

=== Teen Titans Go! (2004–2008) ===
In 2004, shortly after the debut of the Teen Titans TV series (itself loosely based on Wolfman and Pérez's New Teen Titans comics), DC launched a companion comic under their Johnny DC children's imprint. Teen Titans Go! broadly kept to the anime-inspired look and style of the TV series and sometimes featured "chibi versions of the Titans populating the panel borders with commentary or the occasional knock-knock joke."

Although the TV series was unable to use the character of Wonder Girl "[d]ue to licensing restrictions," she became a recurring character in the tie-in comic in Teen Titans Go! #36, using a design by producer Glen Murakami, who also provided the cover art to that issue. The series was written by J. Torres, with art primarily by Todd Nauck and Larry Stucker. It outlasted the TV show, running 55 issues through July 2008.

=== Tiny Titans (2008–2012) ===
In February 2008, a second Johnny DC children's Titans title was launched, this time dropping the "Teen" moniker, in favor of highlighting the youth of the characters featured. Written and illustrated by Art Baltazar and Franco, the series features "your favorite Titans, in their cutest possible form," with each issue featuring a number of "cute" stories. Unlike Teen Titans Go!, which has an animesque style, Tiny Titans is more reminiscent of American children's cartoons, albeit sometimes described as utilising the chibi form, by virtue of its "tiny" subjects.

== Publications ==
=== Primary ongoing series ===
- Teen Titans #1–53 (February 1966 – February 1973; November 1976 – February 1978)
- The New Teen Titans #1–40 (November 1980 – March 1984)
  - The New Teen Titans Annual #1–2 (1982–1983)
- Tales of the Teen Titans #41–58 (April 1984 – October 1985)
  - Tales of the Teen Titans Annual #3–4 (1984–1986)
- The New Teen Titans vol. 2, #1–49 (August 1984 – November 1988)
  - The New Teen Titans Annual vol. 2, #1–4 (1985–1988)
- The New Titans #50–130 (December 1988 – December 1995)
  - The New Titans Annual #5–11 (1989–1995)
- Teen Titans vol. 2, #1–24 (August 1996 – July 1998)
  - Teen Titans Annual vol. 2, #1 (1997)
- The Titans #1–50 (January 1999 – February 2003)
  - The Titans Annual #1 (2000)
- Teen Titans vol. 3, #1–100 (July 2003 – August 2011)
  - Teen Titans Annual vol. 3, #1–2 (2006–2009)
- Titans vol. 2, #1–38 (April 2008 – August 2011)
  - Titans Annual vol. 2, #1 (2011)
- Teen Titans vol. 4, #1–30 (September 2011 – April 2014)
  - Teen Titans Annual vol. 4, #1–3 (2012–2014)
- Teen Titans vol. 5, #1–24 (July 2014– September 2016)
  - Teen Titans Annual vol. 5 #1–2 (2015–2016)
- Titans vol. 3, #1–36 (September 2016–June 2019)
- Teen Titans vol. 6, #1–47 (December 2016–January 2021)
- Teen Titans Academy #1–15 (March 2021–May 2022)
  - Teen Titans Academy 2021 Yearbook #1 (June 2021)
- Titans vol. 4, #1–present (July 2023 – present)

=== Spin-off series ===
- Teen Titans Spotlight On #1–21 (August 1986 – April 1988)
- Team Titans #1–24 (September 1992 – September 1994)
  - Team Titans Annual #1–2 (1993–1994)
- Teen Titans Go! #1–55 (January 2004 – July 2008)
- Tiny Titans #1–50 (April 2008 – May 2012)
- Teen Titans Go! vol. 2 #1–36 (February 2014 – November 2019)

=== Limited series and specials ===
Specials and limited series which are part of an ongoing story in the primary series, or became ongoing series, are also included above.

==== Limited series ====
- Tales of the New Teen Titans #1–4 (June 1982 – September 1982)
- The New Teen Titans Drug Awareness Giveaway #1–3 (1983)
- JLA/Titans #1–3 (December 1998 – February 1999)
- Titans Secret Files and Origins #1–2 (March 1999 – August 2000)
- Titans/Legion of Super-Heroes: Universe Ablaze #1–4 (March 2000 – June 2000)
- Titans/Young Justice: Graduation Day #1–3 (July 2003 – August 2003)
- Teen Titans: Year One #1–6 (January 2008 – June 2008)
- Terror Titans #1–6 (December 2008 – May 2009)
- Blackest Night: Titans #1–3 (October 2009 – December 2009)
- Tity Titans/Little Archie and his Pals #1–3 (December 2010 – February 2011)
- Tiny Titans: Return to the Treehouse #1–6 (August 2014 – January 2015)
- Teen Titans: Earth One vol. 1–2 (January 2015, October 2016)
- Convergence: New Teen Titans #1–2 (June 2015 – July 2015)
- Convergence: Titans #1–2 (June 2015 – July 2015)
- Titans: Hunt #1–8 (October 2015 – May 2016)
- Titans: Burning Rage #1–7 (October 2019 – April 2020)
- Future State: Teen Titans #1–2 (March 2021 – April 2021)
- Titans United #1–7 (November 2021 – May 2022)
- Multiversity: Teen Justice #1–6 (August 2022 – January 2023)
- Titans United: Bloodpact #1–6 (November 2022 – April 2023)
- World's Finest: Teen Titans #1–present (September 2023 – present)
- Tales of the Titans #1–4 (September 2023 – December 2023)
- Knight Terrors: Titans #1–2 (September 2023 – October 2023)
- Titans: Beast World #1–present (January 2024 – present)

==== One-shots and original graphic novels ====
- Marvel and DC Present: The Uncanny X-Men and the New Teen Titans #1 (DC Comics/Marvel Comics; January 1982)
- Titans $ell-Out! Special #1 (November 1992)
- Titan Beat (1996)
- Titans: Scissors, Paper, Stone (January 1997)
- New Year's Evil: Dark Nemesis (February 1998)
- Silver Age: Teen Titans #1 (July 2000)
- Teen Titans/Outsiders Secret Files and Origins 2003 (June 2003)
- Teen Titans/The Legion Special (November 2004)
- Teen Titans/Outsiders Secret Files and Origins 2005 (August 2005)
- Teen Titans: Jam-Packed Action! (December 2005)
- Titans East Special #1 (January 2008)
- Teen Titans Lost Annual #1 (March 2008)
- Titans: Villains For Hire Special #1 (July 2010)
- Teen Titans: Cold Case #1 (February 2011)
- The New Teen Titans: Games (September 2011)
- DC Comics Presents: Teen Titans 100-Page Spectacular #1 (October 2011)
- Teen Titans: Futures End #1 (November 2014)
- Titans: Rebirth #1 (August 2016)
- Teen Titans Go!: Teeny Titans #1 (August 2016)
- Teen Titans: Rebirth #1 (November 2016)
- Teen Titans: The Lazarus Contract Special #1 (July 2017)
- Titans Special #1 (August 2018)
- Teen Titans Special #1 (August 2018)
- Teen Titans: Raven (August 2019)
- Teen Titans Go! Giant #1 (December 2019)
- Tales from the Dark Multiverse: Teen Titans: The Judas Contract #1 (February 2020)
- Teen Titans Go!/DC Super Hero Girls Giant #1 (July 2020)
- Teen Titans: Beast Boy (November 2020)
- Teen Titans: Endless Winter Special #1 (February 2021)
- Future State: Teen Titans - Ruins #1 (May 2021)
- Teen Titans: Beast Boy Loves Raven (November 2021)
- Teen Titans Go!/DC Super Hero Girls: Exchange Students! (March 2022)
- Teen Titans Go!: Undead?! (August 2022)
- Teen Titans: Robin (May 2023)
- Titans: Beast World Evolution #1 (January 2024)
- Titans: Beast World - Waller Rising #1 (February 2024)
- Titans: Beast World Tour - Metropolis #1 (February 2024)
- Titans: Beast World Tour - Gotham #1 (February 2024)

=== Reprint series ===
- Tales of the Teen Titans #59–91 (November 1985 – July 1988)
- Teen Titans Giant #1–7 (August 2018 – January 2019)
- Titans Giant #1–7 (February 2019 – October 2019)

== Collected editions ==
=== Silver Age Teen Titans ===
Title	Material collected	Pages	ISBN
Showcase Presents Teen Titans Vol. 1	The Brave and the Bold #54, #60; Showcase #59; Teen Titans #1–18	528	1-4012-0788-X
Showcase Presents Teen Titans Vol. 2	Teen Titans #19–36; The Brave and the Bold #83, #94; World's Finest Comics #205	512	1-4012-1252-2
The Silver Age Teen Titans Archives Vol. 1	The Brave and the Bold #54, #60; Showcase #59; Teen Titans #1–5	203	1-4012-0071-0
The Silver Age Teen Titans Archives Vol. 2	The Brave and the Bold #83; Teen Titans #6–20	400	978-1-4012-4105-6
Teen Titans: The Silver Age Omnibus Vol. 1	The Brave and the Bold #54, #60, #83; Showcase #59; Teen Titans #1–19	880	1-4012-6756-4
Teen Titans: The Bronze Age Omnibus	Teen Titans #25–53; The Brave and the Bold #94, #102, #149; Batman Family #6, #8–9	724	978-1-4012-7075-9
DC Universe Illustrated by Neal Adams Vol. 1	Teen Titans #20–22	192	1-4012-1917-9
Giant Teen Titans Annual #1 (1967 issue, published 1999)	Showcase #59; Teen Titans #4; The Flash #164; Wonder Woman #144	80	1-56389-486-6

=== New Teen Titans ===
Hardcovers	Material collected	Pages	ISBN
DC Archives: The New Teen Titans Vol. 1	DC Comics Presents #26; The New Teen Titans #1–8	230	1-56389-485-8
DC Archives: The New Teen Titans Vol. 2	The New Teen Titans #9–16; The Best of DC Blue Ribbon Digest #18	240	1-56389-951-5
DC Archives: The New Teen Titans Vol. 3	The New Teen Titans #17–20; Tales of the New Teen Titans #1–4	228	1-4012-1144-5
DC Archives: The New Teen Titans Vol. 4	The New Teen Titans #21–27, Annual #1	224	1-4012-1959-4
The New Teen Titans Omnibus Vol. 1	DC Comics Presents #26; The New Teen Titans #1–20; The Best of DC Blue Ribbon Digest #18; Tales of the New Teen Titans #1–4	684	1-4012-3108-X
The New Teen Titans Omnibus Vol. 2	The New Teen Titans #21–37, #39–40, Tales of the Teen Titans #41–44, Annual #1–3	736	1-4012-3429-1
The New Teen Titans Omnibus Vol. 3	The New Teen Titans #38, Tales of the Teen Titans #45–50, The New Teen Titans vol. 2 #1–6, The New Titans #50–61, #66–67, and Secret Origins Annual #3	792	1-4012-3845-9

Trade Paperbacks	Material collected	Pages	ISBN
The New Teen Titans Vol. 1	The New Teen Titans #1–8, DC Comics Presents #26	240	978-1-4012-5143-7
The New Teen Titans Vol. 2	The New Teen Titans #9–16	232	978-1-4012-5532-9
The New Teen Titans Vol. 3	The New Teen Titans #17–20, Tales of the New Teen Titans #1–4	224	978-1-4012-5854-2
The New Teen Titans Vol. 4	The New Teen Titans #21–27, Annual #1	144	978-1-4012-6085-9
The New Teen Titans Vol. 5	The New Teen Titans #28–34, Annual #2	200	978-1-4012-6358-4
The New Teen Titans Vol. 6	The New Teen Titans #35–40, Tales of the Teen Titans #41 and Batman and the Outsiders #5	200	978-1-4012-6576-2
The New Teen Titans Vol. 7	Tales of the Teen Titans #42-48, Annual #3	220	978-1-4012-7162-6
The New Teen Titans Vol. 8	Tales of the Teen Titans #49-58	164	978-1-4012-7496-2
The New Teen Titans Vol. 9	The New Teen Titans vol. 2 #1-9	240	978-1-4012-8125-0
The New Teen Titans Vol. 10	The New Teen Titans vol. 2 #10-15, Annual #1	216	978-1-4012-8824-2
The New Teen Titans Vol. 11	The New Teen Titans vol. 2 #16-23, The Omega Men #34	272	978-1-4012-9520-2
The New Teen Titans Vol. 12	The New Teen Titans vol. 2 #24-31, Annual #2 and material from Tales of the Teen Titans #84-88	312	978-1-77950-471-5
The New Teen Titans Vol. 13	The New Teen Titans vol. 2 #32-40, Annual #3, Infinity, Inc. #45	336	978-1-77950-809-6
The New Teen Titans Vol. 14	The New Teen Titans vol. 2 #41-49, Annual #4, Secret Origins #13, Annual #3 and Tales of the Teen Titans #91	416	978-1-77951-549-0
Terra Incognito	The New Teen Titans #28–34, select pages from #26, Annual #2	224	1-4012-0972-6
The Judas Contract	The New Teen Titans #39–40; Tales of the Teen Titans #41–44, Annual #3	192	0-930289-34-X
The Terror of Trigon	The New Teen Titans #1–5	134	1-56389-944-2
Who is Donna Troy?	The New Teen Titans #38; Tales of the Teen Titans #50; The New Titans #50–54, select pages from #55 "Who Was Donna Troy?" back-up story from Teen Titans/Outsiders Secret Files and Origins 2003	224	1-4012-0724-3

=== The New Titans ===
Title	Material collected	Pages	ISBN
Titans: Total Chaos (cancelled by the publisher)	The New Titans #90–92; Deathstroke the Terminator #14–16; Team Titans #1–3	360	1-4012-6439-5

=== The Titans ===
Title	Material collected	Pages	ISBN
JLA/Titans: The Technis Imperative	JLA/Titans #1–3; Titans Secret Files and Origins #1	192	1-4012-2776-7
Titans/Young Justice: Graduation Day	Titans/Young Justice: Graduation Day #1–3 (see also The Death and Return of Donna Troy below)	55	1-4012-0176-8

=== Teen Titans (2003–2011) ===
Note: Issues #27–28, penciled by artist Rob Liefeld and written by Gail Simone, are not collected in any of the trade paperbacks and were reprinted in DC Comics Presents: Brightest Day #3 (Feb. 2011), which also included Legends of the DC Universe #26–27 (tying in with characters spotlighted in Brightest Day). Issues #48–49, which tie in with the "Amazons Attack" Wonder Woman story, are likewise not collected in a trade paperback.

Vol. #	Title	Material collected	Pages	ISBN
1	A Kid's Game	Teen Titans vol. 3 #1–7; Teen Titans/Outsiders Secret Files and Origins 2003	192	978-1-4012-0308-5
2	Family Lost	Teen Titans vol. 3 #8–12, #1/2	136	978-1-4012-0238-5
3	Beast Boys and Girls	Beast Boy #1–4 (1999 limited series); Teen Titans vol. 3 #13–15	168	978-1-4012-0459-4
4	The Future is Now	Teen Titans/Legion Special #1; Teen Titans vol. 3 #16–23	224	978-1-4012-0475-4
	Teen Titans/Outsiders: The Insiders	Teen Titans vol. 3 #24–26; Outsiders vol. 3 #24–25, #28	144	978-1-4012-0926-1
	Teen Titans/Outsiders: The Death and Return of Donna Troy	Titans/Young Justice: Graduation Day #1–3; Teen Titans/Outsiders Secret Files and Origins 2003; DC Special: The Return of Donna Troy #1–4	176	1-4012-0931-9
5	Life and Death	Teen Titans vol. 3 #29–33, Annual vol. 3 #1; Robin vol. 4 #146–147; Infinite Crisis #5–6	208	978-1-4012-0978-0
6	Titans Around the World	Teen Titans vol. 3 #34–41	192	978-1-4012-1217-9
7	Titans East	Teen Titans vol. 3 #42–47	144	978-1-4012-1447-0
8	Titans of Tomorrow	Teen Titans vol. 3 #50–54	144	978-1-4012-1807-2
9	On the Clock	Teen Titans vol. 3 #55–61	160	978-1-4012-1971-0
10	Changing of the Guard	Teen Titans vol. 3 #62–69	192	978-1-4012-2309-0
11	Deathtrap	Teen Titans vol. 3 #70, Annual 2009; Titans vol. 2 #12–13; Vigilante vol. 3 #5–6	192	978-1-4012-2509-4
12	Child's Play	Teen Titans vol. 3 #71–78	208	978-1-4012-2641-1
13	Hunt for Raven	Teen Titans vol. 3 #79–87	208	978-1-4012-3038-8
14	Team Building	Teen Titans vol. 3 #88–92, Red Robin #20, Wonder Girl vol. 2 #1	168	978-1-4012-3256-6
15	Prime of Life	Teen Titans vol. 3 #93–100	200	978-1-4012-3424-9
N/A	Ravager – Fresh Hell	Backup stories from Teen Titans vol. 3 #72–75, #78–82	144	978-1-4012-2919-1

Title	Material Collected	Pages	ISBN
Teen Titans by Geoff Johns Book One	Teen Titans vol. 3 #1–12, #1/2, Teen Titans/Outsiders Secret Files and Origins 2003	368	978-1-4012-6598-4
Teen Titans by Geoff Johns Book Two	Teen Titans vol. 3 #13–19, Beast Boy #1-4, Teen Titans/Legion Special #1, Legends of the DCU 80-Page Giant #1	336	978-1-4012-7752-9
Teen Titans by Geoff Johns Book Three	Teen Titans vol. 3 #20-26; #29-31 and Outsiders vol. 3 #24-25	296	978-1-4012-8952-2

=== Titans (2008–2011) ===
Vol. #	Title	Material collected	Pages	ISBN
1	Old Friends	Titans East Special #1; Titans vol. 2 #1–6	200	1-4012-1991-8
2	Lockdown	Titans vol. 2 #7–11	128	1-4012-2476-8
3	Fractured	Titans vol. 2 #14, #16–22	192	1-4012-2776-7
4	Villains for Hire	Titans: Villains for Hire Special #1; Titans vol. 2 #24–27	160	1-4012-3048-2
5	Family Reunion	Titans vol. 2 #28–32, Shazam! #1	144	978-1-4012-3293-1
6	Broken Promises (Cancelled)	Titans vol. 2 #33–38, Annual vol. 2 #1	176	978-1-4012-3360-0

=== The New 52 Teen Titans (2011–2014) ===
Vol. #	Title	Material collected	Pages	ISBN
1	It's Our Right to Fight	Teen Titans vol. 4 #1–7	168	978-1-4012-3698-4
	The Culling: Rise of the Ravagers	Teen Titans vol. 4 #8–9, Annual #1; Legion Lost vol. 2 #8–9; Superboy vol. 6 #8–9	176	978-1-4012-3799-8
2	The Culling	Teen Titans vol. 4, #8–14, DC Universe Presents #12: Kid Flash	192	978-1-4012-4103-2
3	Death of the Family	Teen Titans vol. 4 #0, #15–17, Batman #17, Red Hood and the Outlaws #16	160	978-1-4012-4321-0
4	Light and Dark	Teen Titans vol. 4 #18–23	144	978-1-4012-4624-2
5	The Trial of Kid Flash	Teen Titans vol. 4 #24–30, Annual #2–3	256	978-1-4012-5053-9

=== The New 52 Teen Titans re-launch (2014–2016) ===
Vol. #	Title	Material collected	Pages	ISBN
1	Teen Titans Vol. 1: Blinded by the Light	Teen Titans vol. 5 #1–7	176	978-1-4012-5237-3
2	Teen Titans Vol. 2: Rogue Targets	Teen Titans vol. 5 #8–12, Annual #1	192	978-1-4012-6162-7
3	Teen Titans Vol. 3: The Sum of Its Parts	Teen Titans vol. 5 #14–19	144	978-1-4012-6520-5
4	Teen Titans Vol. 4: When Titans Fall	Teen Titans vol. 5 #20–24, Annual #2, Teen Titans: Rebirth #1	184	978-1-4012-6977-7

=== DC Rebirth Titans, Teen Titans (2016–2020) ===
Vol. #	Title	Material collected	Pages	ISBN
	Titans: Hunt	Titans: Hunt #1–8, Justice League #51 and Titans: Rebirth #1	264	978-1-4012-6555-7
1	Titans Vol. 1: The Return of Wally West	Titans: Rebirth #1, Titans vol. 3 #1–6	168	978-1-4012-6817-6
2	Titans Vol. 2: Made in Manhattan	Titans vol. 3 #7–10, Titans Annual #1, stories from DC Rebirth Holiday Special #1	152	978-1-4012-7377-4
	Titans: The Lazarus Contract	Titans vol. 3 #11, Teen Titans vol. 6 #8, Deathstroke vol. 4 #19–20, Titans Annual #1	136	978-1-4012-7650-8
3	Titans Vol. 3: A Judas Among Us	Titans vol. 3 #12–18	168	978-1-4012-7759-8
4	Titans Vol. 4: Titans Apart	Titans vol. 3 #19–22, Titans Annual #2	169	978-1-4012-8448-0
5	Titans Vol. 5: The Spark	Titans vol. 3 #23–27, Titans Special #1	184	978-1-4012-8774-0
6	Titans Vol. 6: Into the Bleed	Titans vol. 3 #29–36	200	978-1-4012-9167-9
	Titans: Burning Rage	Titans: Burning Rage #1–7	192	978-1-77950-299-5
	Titans United	Titans United #1–7	200	978-1-77951-674-9
	Titans United: Bloodpact	Titans United: Bloodpact #1–6	160	978-1-77951-831-6

Vol. #	Title	Material collected	Pages	ISBN
1	Teen Titans Vol. 1: Damian Knows Best	Teen Titans: Rebirth #1, Teen Titans vol. 6 #1–5	144	978-1-4012-7077-3
2	Teen Titans Vol. 2: The Rise of Aqualad	Teen Titans vol. 6 #6–7, 9–11	128	978-1-4012-7504-4
3	Teen Titans Vol. 3: The Return of Kid Flash	Teen Titans vol. 6 #13–14, #16–19 and a story from DC Holiday Special 2017	152	978-1-4012-8459-6

Vol. #	Title	Material collected	Pages	ISBN
1	Teen Titans Vol. 1: Full Throttle	Teen Titans Special #1, Teen Titans vol. 6 #20-24.	168	978-1-4012-8878-5
2	Teen Titans Vol. 2: Turn it Up	Teen Titans vol. 6 #25–27, Teen Titans Annual #1	144	978-1-4012-9467-0
	Teen Titans/Deathstroke: The Terminus Agenda	Deathstroke vol. 4 #41–43, Teen Titans vol. 6 #28–30	160	978-1-77950-236-0
3	Teen Titans Vol. 3: Seek and Destroy	Teen Titans vol. 6 #31–38	192	978-1-77950-008-3
4	Teen Titans Vol. 4: Robin No More	Teen Titans vol. 6 #39–47, Teen Titans Annual #2	256	978-1-77950-668-9

=== Infinite Frontier, Dawn of DC (2021–present) ===
Vol. #	Title	Material collected	Pages	ISBN
1	Teen Titans Academy Vol. 1: X Marks the Spot	Suicide Squad vol. 7 #3, Teen Titans Academy #1–5, Teen Titans Academy 2021 Yearbook #1, material from Infinite Frontier #0	200	978-1-77951-562-9
2	Teen Titans Academy Vol. 2: Exit Wounds	Teen Titans Academy #6–15	240	978-1-77952-014-2

Vol. #	Title	Material collected	Pages	ISBN
1	Titans Vol. 1: Out of the Shadows	Titans vol. 4 #1–5	120	978-1-77952-512-3
