= The Lazarus Contract =

Comic book storyline

- Publisher: DC Comics
- Publication date: July – August 2017
- Genre: Superhero
Title(s)
Titans (vol. 3) #11, Teen Titans (vol. 6) #8, Deathstroke (vol. 4) #19-20, Teen Titans: The Lazarus Contract Special #1
- Main character(s): Deathstroke; Wally West; Dick Grayson; Damian Wayne; Ace West

Creative team
- Writer(s): Christopher Priest; Benjamin Percy; Dan Abnett
- Artist: Brett Booth
- Penciller: Brett Booth
- Inker: Norm Rapmund
- Letterer: Josh Reed
- Colorist(s): Andrew Dalhouse
- Editor: Marie Javis

"The Lazarus Contract" is a Deathstroke / Teen Titans crossover event featuring Deathstroke and the Flash in the DC Comics. The story revolves around Deathstroke trying to steal the Flashes' powers to travel back in time to save his son. The crossover received generally positive reviews for the plot and artstyle, but the ending received some criticism.

== Synopsis ==
Years ago, Deathstroke (Slade Wilson) and his son Grant Wilson were fighting against the Teen Titans (Robin, Wally West / Kid Flash, Aqualad, Speedy, Wonder Girl, and Omen) when Grant suddenly had a heart attack and died despite Kid Flash's efforts to save him. Deathstroke blames Grant's death on the Titans and tells them they will all pay.

In the present, the Titans are fighting against henchmen hired by Deathstroke in New York when Wally West is captured. Slade offers Wally a deal: help him go back in time and save his son, and he will stop being Deathstroke. Wally refuses, so Slade recruits an imprisoned Kid Flash (Ace West) in his place.

The Teen Titans (Damian Wayne, Aqualad, Starfire, Raven, and Beast Boy) realize Kid Flash is missing when his tracer is found on Damian's costume. The Titans and the Teen Titans work together to find the two Flashes. Deathstroke successfully persuades Kid Flash to help him go back in time to save his son. When the Titans and Teen Titans arrive, Deathstroke absorbs some of Kid Flash's speed.

Wally chases after Slade, and Slade reveals to him that in the past, Slade made a truce with Dick Grayson. If he trained Rose Wilson to be a hero with his morals, then Slade would not attack the original Teen Titans, calling it a Lazarus Contract. If Dick refused or failed to teach Rose, Slade would try to kill the Titans once again. The two teams try to find Deathstroke, leaving Kid Flash and Aqualad behind.

Deathstroke travels to the past and confronts Grant, who is horrified to learn that his idol is his father who left him when he was young. Wally West, Jericho, Raven, and Starfire combine their powers to create a time vortex that allows the Titans to travel to the past. Damian uses a palm technique called commotio cordis on past Wally West to make his heart stop. This will cause current Wally to start fading, which means Deathstroke will lose his super speed. In the past, Grant Wilson vanishes in front of Deathstroke.

Ace gets his speed back and past Wally recovers, destroying the time vortex. Deathstroke arrives in the present and plans to go into the Speed Force to go even farther back in time, and after he is done he will kill everyone. The adult Wally appears again and tells everyone that if Deathstroke goes into the Speed Force, he will be unable to escape due to his inexperience. Wally rescues Slade, who explains that he saw things in the Speed Force that the Titans would not understand and has lost his drive to kill them. Deathstroke drops his sword and mask and walks away.

In the epilogue, Damian fires Kid Flash because he trusted Deathstroke and nearly put innocent lives at risk. Wally is left weakened by his experiences, leaving him unable to run as fast and forced to use a pacemaker. Deathstroke decides to create his own version of the Teen Titans that includes Wintergreen, Jericho, and Rose Wilson.

== Reception ==
The crossover received generally positive reviews, but critics noted that the ending was anticlimactic.

According to review aggregator Comic Book Roundup, Titans Vol. 3 #11 received a score of 7.9 out of 10 based on 22 reviews. Teen Titans Vol. 6 #8 received a score of 7.5 out of 10 based on 19 reviews. Deathstroke Vol. 4 #19 received a score of 7.5 out of 10 based on 20 reviews. Teen Titans: Lazarus Contract Special #1 received a score of 7.3 out of 10 based on 24 reviews. Deathstroke Vol. 4 #20 received a score of 8.2 out of 10 based on 10 reviews.

== Collected edition ==
Title	Material collected	Published date	ISBN
Titans: The Lazarus Contract	Titans #11, Teen Titans #8, Deathstroke #19-20, Teen Titans : The Lazarus Contract Special #1	November 2017	978-1401276508
