= Kole =

Superhero from the DC Universe

- Kole as depicted in Who's Who: The Definitive Directory of the DC Universe #12 (February 1986). Art by José Luis García-López.

Publication information
- Publisher: DC Comics
- First appearance: The New Teen Titans (vol. 2) #9 (June 1985)
- Created by: George Pérez (artist); Marv Wolfman (writer)

In-story information
- Alter ego: Kole Weathers
- Species: Metahuman
- Team affiliations: Teen Titans
- Abilities: Crystal generation; Crystal solidification; Crystal construct creation; Flight

Kole Weathers is a fictional character appearing in American comic books published by DC Comics. Kole was created by Marv Wolfman and George Pérez, and first appeared in The New Teen Titans (vol. 2) #9 (June 1985). Shortly after her introduction, Kole was killed off in the storyline Crisis on Infinite Earths. Decades after her death, Kole returned in the 2018 series Heroes in Crisis.

Tara Strong voices Kole in the animated series Teen Titans.

== Publication history ==
Kole was introduced in the series The New Teen Titans, shortly before the storyline Crisis on Infinite Earths. In Crisis on Infinite Earths, Kole was killed off. Writer Marv Wolfman, who worked on both The New Teen Titans and Crisis on Infinite Earths, stated that he decided to kill off Kole after hearing from other writers, who wanted one of his characters to die. In retrospect, Wolfman regretted killing off Kole.

== Fictional character biography ==
Kole as shown in The New Teen Titans #9 (1985).

Professor Abel Weathers, paranoid of an impending nuclear holocaust, seeks to find a way for humanity to survive the fallout through forced evolution. One of the test subjects in his experiments is his 16-year-old daughter, Kole, whom he grafts with crystal and promethium. Her father's experiments give Kole the ability to create and control crystal at will.

Kole is kidnapped by Theia, who forces her to construct a crystal prison on Mount Olympus for her use. Theia comes into conflict with the Teen Titans and is killed in the ensuing battle, with Kole being freed. Lilith Clay, a member of the Titans who possesses precognition, senses "dark clouds of destruction" around Kole. She attempts to prevent her from returning to Earth, but Kole refuses. Kole is taken in by Adeline Kane and befriends Adeline's son Joseph, who she briefly enters a relationship with.

Kole attempts to reunite with her parents, only for her father to capture the Titans and attempt to experiment on them. In the ensuing conflict, Abel's laboratory is destroyed. Abel, his wife Marilyn, and their test subjects emerge from the wreckage, transformed into insect-like forms.

In Crisis on Infinite Earths, Kole attempts to save the Robin and Huntress of Earth-Two from the Anti-Monitor's Shadow Demons. She fails and all three are killed by the demons, with their bodies never being found.

Kole is resurrected following the DC Rebirth relaunch and appears in Heroes in Crisis as a patient at the Sanctuary therapy center.

== Powers and abilities ==
Kole has the power to "spin" crystal, which is to create silicon crystal into independent masses—anything from a crystal "sculpture to a safety slide". She is able to encase people in crystal, effectively immobilizing them.

== Other versions ==
An alternate universe version of Kole appears in Teen Titans: Earth One. This version was given powers by and formerly worked for Niles Caulder.

== In other media ==
Kole as seen in Teen Titans.

- Kole appears in Teen Titans, voiced by Tara Strong. This version is an honorary member of the Teen Titans who can transform her entire body into crystal and lives with Gnarrk in an isolated Arctic cavern to prevent her powers from being used for evil.
- Kole appears as a character summon in Scribblenauts Unmasked: A DC Comics Adventure.
- The Teen Titans animated series incarnation of Kole appears in Teen Titans Go!.
