= Mal Duncan =

- Mal Duncan as Vox in Teen Titans (vol. 3) #36 (July 2006), art by Tony Daniel.

Publication information
- Publisher: DC Comics
- First appearance: Teen Titans #26 (March–April 1970)
- Created by: Robert Kanigher (writer); Nick Cardy (artist)

In-story information
- Alter ego: Malcolm Arnold "Mal" Duncan
- Species: Metahuman
- Place of origin: Harlem, New York; Hell's Corner, Metropolis
- Team affiliations: Doom Patrol; Teen Titans
- Partnerships: Bumblebee; Gnarrk; Donna Troy
- Notable aliases: Guardian; Hornblower; The Herald; Vox
- Abilities: Skilled hand to hand combatant and kickboxer; (As Herald/Vox) Sound manipulation, sonic blasts; (As Hornblower) Creating interdimensional portals

Malcolm Arnold "Mal" Duncan is a superhero published in American comic books by DC Comics. Created by writer Robert Kanigher and artist Nick Cardy, he debuted in Teen Titans #26 (April, 1970). Having numerous codenames since his inception, the character is noted as among the earliest African-American superhero in DC Comics. Duncan is also notable in being depicted in the first interracial kiss in comic book history with Lilith Clay.

Throughout his publication history, the character's history has been subjected to various revisions; having been raised in either Harlem or Hell's Corner in Metropolis, Duncan has been portrayed as both a non-powered human and metahuman. After a chance encounter with the Teen Titans, he subsequently joins the team as the second Guardian and for a brief time, Hornblower. He becomes involved with Bumblebee, eventually culminating to a marriage, and often sought to prove his worth within the team or adjust to the lifestyle of a superhero. Duncan also became Vox after following the Infinite Crisis crossover, in which he was a part of the Doom Patrol. A well-regarded celebrity, he retires from superheroics to focus on both his fatherhood and career but occasionally dons his Guardian codename and costume to assist Bumblebee, who acts as both a superhero and scientist for S.T.A.R. Labs.

The character has been adapted in various DC Media, first in Teen Titans as Herald, voiced by Khary Payton. He later appears notably in Young Justice, voiced by Kevin Michael Richardson, wherein he was first a mission coordinator and later adopts the Guardian codename before retiring to focus on raising his daughter with Bumblebee.

== Publication history ==
Mal Duncan made his first appearance in Teen Titans #26, and was created by Robert Kanigher and Nick Cardy.

== Fictional character biography ==
=== Pre-Crisis ===
Mal Duncan, art by Chuck Patton and Romeo Tanghal.

Malcolm "Mal" Duncan (Note: His surname "Duncan" is revealed in Teen Titans #44 (November 1976), and his formal first name "Malcolm" is revealed in Teen Titans #45 (December 1976). Prior to these issues, he is known simply as "Mal".) saves the Teen Titans from a street gang called the Hell Hawks by beating their leader in a boxing match. He is recruited into the Titans, but feels unworthy due to his lack of superpowers. Mal later discovers a strength-enhancing exoskeleton and the costume of the Guardian, with which he becomes the second Guardian.

Mal later battles Azrael, the angel of death, and obtains the horn of Gabriel, which grants him unspecified powers whenever the odds are against him in battle. Armed with the horn, Mal assumes the name Hornblower.

Mal soon returns to his Guardian identity, claiming that too many people knew who he was.

=== Post-Crisis ===
Following the Crisis on Infinite Earths, Mal's uncostumed adventures are unchanged. However, in post-Crisis canon, he never took the identity of Guardian, and the Gabriel's Horn is given a very different origin. While the other Titans are on a mission, Mal inadvertently releases an old villain, the Gargoyle (formerly Mister Twister), from Limbo. He recaptures the villain, but finds the plans for a high-tech horn that would create spatial warps. With the help of Karen Beecher, he builds the horn and takes the identity of Herald. However, the Gargoyle implanted a computer virus into the horn that weakens the boundaries between the mortal world and Limbo, so he and his master, the Antithesis, will eventually escape. When Mal discovers this, he destroys the horn. He and Karen retire from super heroics, and move to California.

During the JLA/Titans event, Mal acquires a new Gabriel's Horn, and later, he and Bumblebee join the short-lived Titans LA. In Titans Tomorrow, an alternate timeline version of Mal becomes president of the Eastern United States.

=== 52 ===
Mal and Bumblebee join a team of heroes gathered by Troia to embark on a mission into deep space during the events of Infinite Crisis. The group eventually encounters a rift in the universe caused by Alexander Luthor Jr., who is re-creating the multiverse and restructuring it to create the "perfect" universe—a plan that would lead to the deaths of billions of people, and the entire post-crisis DC Universe. The team of heroes in space is able to temporarily stop Luthor, but in the resulting chaos they are scattered; some are killed, while others go missing for varying lengths of time, including Mal and Karen.

Four weeks after his disappearance, Mal is rescued from a Zeta Beam transport accident. His lungs and vocal cords have been damaged after Gabriel's Horn exploded in his face, and parts of Red Tornado have been embedded in his chest. One year after Infinite Crisis, Mal joins the Doom Patrol alongside his wife Bumblebee. Now known as Vox, Mal has been given a synthesized voice box which can create sonic blasts and open dimensional portals.

=== New 52 onwards (2012 - Present) ===
==== New 52 and DC Rebirth: Titans Hunt and Titans (2015 - 2019) ====
Following the New 52, a reboot of DC's continuity, the characters' history is remarked to have been altered; in this revised history, Mal was a metahuman with sonic abilities, a former member of the Titans known as Herald, and an award-winning film composer. Eventually getting with Karen Beecher, the pair would marry and were expecting a daughter. He is later kidnapped by Mister Twister, who reveals that as a teenager, Mal was a member of the original Teen Titans under the name Herald. The Titans allowed their memories of each other to be erased to defeat Twister, who now seeks to use Mal's sonic abilities to summon a demon. Karen (who has now gained superpowers of her own) and the former Titans arrive to defeat Mister Twister once and for all.

Later during DC Rebirth, Mal underwent a procedure to remove his superpowers so that he and Karen could live a normal life. When Karen suits up as Bumblebee to help the Titans battle the Fearsome Five, Mal steals armor from Nightwing's room in Titans Tower to back her up. However, he is unable to stop Psimon from removing Bumblebee's memories of Mal and their baby.

==== Other History of the DC Universe (2021) ====
In The Other History of the DC Universe, a summary of accounts from stories in the previous continuity (prior to the New 52) is explored by both Mal himself and Bumblebee from their private perspectives with some differing details; Mal expressed being born and raised in Hell's Corner in Metropolis, being a diverse neighborhood (whereas Suicide Slum was primarily made up of African-Americans) that was simultaneously disenfranchised and noted how Metropolis had a surpisingly high number of pride groups connected to white supremacy growing up and remarked to have grown up in the 1970s. Mal is also recognized as a jazz musician and the account delves deeper into his insecurity in proving his worth as a hero, reconciling his experiences as a Black man within the superhero community, and the evolution of his relationship with Bumblebee despite their yearning to be superheroes and being parents.

== Powers and abilities ==
=== Original version ===
In his original iteration, Duncan had no super-powers but is a Golden Gloves boxing champion and while equipped with the Guardian costume, the exo-skeleton suit grants him superhuman strength. He also once possessed the Gabriel Horn, capable of opening space-time warp to allow for teleportation and generate sonic blasts. As Vox, his powers originated from artificial lungs and voice box capable of achieving the same effects. In addition, Ducan was both a skilled businessman capable of running his own club and a accomplished jazz musician.

=== Current version ===
The current version was formerly a metahuman whose powers allowed him to manipulate sound for a variety of purposes, including being able to emit ultrasonic vibrations through a scream similar to Black Canary. Similarly to his original history, he is a expert boxer proficient in exotic weaponry, particularly a shield. The character is alternatively an accomplished community organizer and musical composer. Similarly to his original version, he once possessed the Gabriel Horn and later a cybernetic voice for a time as Vox, both which granted similar powers to the original version in creating space-time warps.

== Reception ==
=== Interracial kiss controversy ===
In his debut, Mal kissed the Caucasian Lilith Clay goodbye, in a scene considered to be the first interracial kiss in comic book history. When editorial director Carmine Infantino objected to the scene, thinking it too controversial, editor Dick Giordano kept the scene, but colored it in blue as a night scene, to draw less attention to the moment. Giordano recalled receiving many letters about the kiss, both hate mail (including one death threat) and many supportive letters approving of the kiss.

== In other media ==
=== Television ===
- Mal Duncan as Herald appears in Teen Titans, voiced by Khary Payton. This version is an honorary member of the eponymous group.
- Mal Duncan as Guardian appears in Young Justice, voiced by Kevin Michael Richardson. This version is initially a high school student before joining the Team as a mission coordinator. In the episode "Cornered", Duncan assumes the Guardian suit and equipment to battle Despero. In the third season, Young Justice: Outsiders, Duncan retires to focus on his relationship with his wife Karen Beecher and their daughter Rhea.

=== Miscellaneous ===
- Mal Duncan as Herald appears in Teen Titans Go!.
- Mal Duncan as Guardian makes non-speaking appearances in DC Super Hero Girls as a student of Super Hero High.
