= The Terminus Agenda =

Comic book storyline

- Publisher: DC Comics
- Publication date: March – May 2019
- Genre: Superhero
Title(s)
Deathstroke Vol. 4 #41-43, Teen Titans Vol. 6 #28-30
- Main character(s): Deathstroke; Damian Wayne; Ace West; Emiko Queen

Creative team
- Writer(s): Christopher Priest; Adam Glass
- Artist: Brett Booth
- Penciller: Andy Owens
- Inker: Fernando Pasarín
- Letterer: Josh Reed
- Colorist: Bernard Chang
- Editor: Marie Javis

"The Terminus Agenda" is a Deathstroke / Teen Titans crossover event featuring Deathstroke in the DC Comics. The story revolves around Deathstroke trying to mentally break Damian Wayne and sow distrust in the team. The crossover received positive reviews for the plot and art style, but the epilogue received criticism.

== Synopsis ==
Deathstroke's identity had been exposed to the public thanks to him murdering his therapist in Arkham Asylum and Commissioner Gordon orders a manhunt on Deathstroke. Damian Wayne (leader of Teen Titans) tries to convince Jericho to betray his father, but fails. Damian has dreams of Deathstroke killing his teammates (Ace West, Roundhouse, Emiko Queen, Djinn, and Crush) and the next day he plans to take down Deathstroke for killing the mother of his close friend Sophie Evans. The next day, the Teen Titans attempt to masquerade as Deathstroke's barber, but Deathstroke sees through the illusion. The Teen Titans manage to overload his suit and Damian stabs Deathstroke with a knife containing paralytic venom. Damian takes Deathstroke to his prison, but just then Kid Flash shows up due to him putting a tracer on Deathstroke.

Kid Flash is shocked and angry that Damian Wayne locked up every criminal they took down in his own prison, and finds out that Emiko Queen also knows about the secret prison. Kid Flash believes villains can turn their life around but Emiko and Damian disagree saying that Deathstroke is too dangerous to be left alive. Jericho is revealed to have finally sold out Deathstroke to the Teen Titans, and Deathstroke escapes his confines and tells Robin that he will fix Robin by making Damian kill him. Damian wakes up from another nightmare and all the villains in his prison escape thanks to Deathstroke.

Atomic Skull, Black Mask, Brother Blood, Swerve, Gizmo, and Onomatopoeia try to attack Damian but Deathstroke regains his Ikon Armor and saves him. Deathstroke leaves and the rest of the Teen Titans round up the villains. When Swerve is about to escape, Swerve realizes that Damian Wayne infected the criminals with a toxin that in case they escaped, they will die and Deathstroke released the villains on purpose. Deathstroke tries explaining that Damian is just like him, and Emiko Queen shoots an arrow at Deathstroke's eye, killing him. The Teen Titans are angry at Damian Wayne keeping secrets and they all get in a fight, and during the scuffle Lobo appears.

=== Epilogue ===
Ravager is taking out her anger and frustration on criminals. Jericho takes control of the Teen Titans and tries to make them fight each other for what they did to Deathstroke. Meanwhile, Deathstroke's friends and the Legion of Doom (Sinestro, Cheetah, Brainiac, and Gorilla Grodd) attend his funeral. Sinestro defeats Jericho and offers his condolences and respect to Deathstroke before leaving.

It is revealed that Raptor used his leprosy infection to send Deathstroke's healing factor into overdrive, which revived him. Slade went into hiding as a medical doctor, but came back to deal with his evil doppelgänger. In a later adventure against Brother Blood, Damian Wayne reveals that he has taken steps out of line because of his guilt indirectly causing Alfred to be killed by Bane, and Deathstroke tries taking on Damian but the Teen Titans help Damian. Just as Damian is about to kill Deathstroke, Emiko Queen jumps in the attack, and Damian quits being Robin in order to find his own path.

== Reading order ==
- Deathstroke Volume 4 #41 (Prologue)
- Teen Titans Volume 6 #28 (Part 1)
- Deathstroke #42 (Part 2)
- Teen Titans #29 (Part 3)
- Deathstroke #43 (Part 4)
- Teen Titans #30 (Part 5)
- Deathstroke #44 (Epilogue)

== Critical reception ==
The entire series received positive reviews. According to Comic Book Roundup, the entire series received positive reviews, with an average score of 7.9 out of 10 based on 76 reviews.

== Collected edition ==
Title	Material collected	Published date	ISBN
Teen Titans/Deathstroke: The Terminus Agenda	Deathstroke #41-43, Teen Titans #28-30	December 2019	978-1401299651
