= Magenta (DC Comics) =

- Magenta in The Flash (vol. 5) Annual #1 (January 2018), art by Howard Porter.

Publication information
- Publisher: DC Comics
- First appearance: The New Teen Titans #17 (March 1982, as Frances Kane); Teen Titans Spotlight #16 (Nov 1987, as Magenta)
- Created by: Marv Wolfman; George Pérez

In-story information
- Alter ego: Frances 'Frankie' Kane
- Species: Metahuman
- Team affiliations: Injustice League; The Project; Rogues; Cyborg Revenge Squad; Teen Titans
- Abilities: Magnetism manipulation

Magenta (Frances Kane) is a fictional character in the DC Comics' series Teen Titans. She is a former hero turned villain. The character first appeared in The New Teen Titans #17 (March 1982) as Frances Kane, and debuted as Magenta five years later in Teen Titans Spotlight #16 (Nov 1987).

An early concept design for Magenta by George Pérez appeared in DC Sampler #2. The character's initial name was Polara and her color scheme consisted of red and blue rather than magenta and white.

Magenta made her live-action debut in the third season of The Flash, portrayed by Joey King.

== Fictional character biography ==
Frances Kane was Wally West's girlfriend during his time as Kid Flash. When Wally was a member of the New Teen Titans, Frances began to have strange experiences, including objects flying around without control. Frances' mother believed that she had been possessed, a theory that gained credence when, during an especially powerful episode, the silhouette of a large horned person appeared. The Titans managed to save Frances, who was thereafter discovered to have magnetic superpowers. Unbeknownst to the Titans, the silhouette had not been a demon, but the magnetically powered supervillain Doctor Polaris, who had been trapped in another dimension by Green Lantern and was trying to use Frances' nascent powers to escape.

Wally pushes Frances to become "Kid Flash's girlfriend" — a superhero. She became Magenta (a near anagram of "magnet"), and uses her powers as Kid Flash's "super girlfriend" and as a Titans ally. The pressure of being a superhero puts significant stress on her, and the pair break up. Wally West came to regret this breakup as an adult.

Frances' stress and resentment cause her to develop a vindictive and aggressive alternate personality, while her primary self becomes unusually weak-willed and mousy. The "new" Magenta confronts Wally West, which quickly devolves into a brawl. When police intervene, she uses her powers to rip the fillings from their teeth. Flash is horrified by Magenta's nearly homicidal tendencies.

Frances would encounter Wally on and off again many times. In one incident, she was calm and non-violent, realizing that using her powers would awaken her "darker" side. She had to use her powers when another of Flash's enemies teleported a bomb to a computer-determined random location in the city. Frances, riding on Flash's back, was able to detect the bomb with her powers and, risking turning evil, levitate it high enough so its explosion harmed no one. During her time, she formed a friendship with Linda Park, Wally's girlfriend, bonding over things Wally had done in the past.

Magenta becomes involved with the "Cyborg Revenge Squad", a loosely formed group of villains with mastery over metals and cybernetics assembled by Elias Orr. Cyborg gives her an electric shock that brings her back to her senses, unaware of where she is or what she had done but still able to recognize Cyborg. Magenta appears in the post-Rebirth DC Universe. In the "Flash War" prelude, Wally West is hoping to find people from his past who still remember him, so he approaches Frances Kane. She initially does not know who Wally is, but she suddenly regains her missing memories and reacts violently as Magenta. Wally manages to calm her down and they reconcile over their shared history.

== Powers and abilities ==
Magenta can generate and control magnetic fields, which she can use to move, lift, and manipulate ferrous metals as well as achieve magnetic levitation by surrounding herself in a magnetic aura attuned to the Earth's geomagnetic field. Additionally, she can focus her powers into blasts of concussive magnetic force that can shatter steel, fire electromagnetic pulses to disrupt electronic systems, and create a shield capable of repelling metals and most physical assaults.

== In other media ==
Magenta appears in a self-titled episode of The Flash, portrayed by Joey King. This version was initially a regular orphan who lived with her abusive foster father, John James, and his wife Karen. Due to temporal changes made when the Flash undid the "Flashpoint" timeline and following an encounter with Doctor Alchemy, Kane develops a split personality called "Magenta" and becomes a metahuman with magnokinesis. She attempts to take revenge on John, but the Flash talks her down before Caitlin Snow arranges for Kane to be transferred to a new foster home while John is prosecuted.
