= Wally West =

DC Comics superhero

- Wally West as The Flash, as he appeared on a variant cover of The Flash #779 (February 2022). Art by Todd Nauck.

Publication information
- Publisher: DC Comics
- First appearance: As Kid Flash: The Flash #110 (December 1959); As Flash: Crisis on Infinite Earths #12 (March 1986)
- Created by: John Broome (writer); Carmine Infantino (artist)

In-story information
- Full name: Wallace Rudolph "Wally" West
- Species: Metahuman
- Team affiliations: Teen Titans; Young Justice; Justice League
- Partnerships: Raven; The Flash; Green Lantern; Nightwing; Troia
- Notable aliases: Kid Flash; The Flash
- Abilities: Infinite-SuperSpeed; Hyper-Accelerated Brain-Activity; Superhuman Agility and Reflexes; Lightning-Projection and Electrokinesis; Time-Travel and Chronokinesis; Speed-Force Absorption, Negation, and Empathy; Aerokinesis & Temperature-Manipulation; Intangibility and Invisibility via Molecular-Vibration at High-Velocity; Energy-Transformation; Light-Projection and Photokinesis; Accelerated-Healing and Immunity; Enhanced-Perceptions and Senses; Protective Speed-Force Aura; Sonic-Shockwave Projection; Dimensional-Travel; Precognition and Retrocognition; Advanced Hand-To-Hand Combatant; Genius-level Intellect

Wallace Rudolph "Wally" West is a superhero appearing in American comic books published by DC Comics as the original Kid Flash and the third Flash, the fastest man in the multiverse. Created by artist Carmine Infantino and writer John Broome, his power consists mainly of superhuman speed. The nephew of Iris West, he first appeared in Flash #110 (1959), which depicted his transformation into Kid Flash. Under the mantle of Kid Flash, Wally was depicted as a teenage sidekick to his uncle-by-marriage, Barry Allen, and a founding member of the Teen Titans. After Barry's death in Crisis on Infinite Earths in 1985, Wally took on the role of the Flash in 1986, and would be the main Flash until 2009, and again from 2021.

Generally portrayed as a white man with red hair and green eyes, Wally was reinterpreted as biracial for DC's 2011 New 52 relaunch. A desire from fans to see the original interpretation of the character restored, however, led to Wally returning in 2016's DC Rebirth, while his New 52 reinterpretation was made into a separate character, Ace West, to avoid confusion.

Wally West has appeared in many other forms of media and was featured as the incarnation of the Flash in the Cartoon Network series Justice League, voiced by Michael Rosenbaum, and the 2010 film Justice League: Crisis on Two Earths, voiced by Josh Keaton. As Kid Flash, he appeared in Cartoon Network's Teen Titans series voiced again by Michael Rosenbaum and subsequently in the Young Justice series, voiced by Jason Spisak. In live action, Keiynan Lonsdale played the character in Arrowverse shows, notably The Flash and Legends of Tomorrow.

== Fictional character biography ==
=== Kid Flash ===
Wallace Rudolph West II, or Wally West, was created by John Broome and Carmine Infantino and introduced in The Flash #110 (1959). The character was the nephew of the existing Flash character's girlfriend and later wife, Iris West. During a visit to the Central City police laboratory where Barry Allen worked, the freak accident that gave Allen his powers repeated itself, bathing Wally in electrically charged chemicals. Now possessing the same powers as the Flash, West donned a smaller-sized copy of Barry Allen's Flash outfit and became Kid Flash. Wally had a strained relationship with his own parents and often looked to his beloved aunt and uncle for moral support and guidance. He also operated as a lone superhero in his hometown, Blue Valley, Nebraska, when not partnering with the Flash.

This costume was later altered in The Flash #135 (1963) to one that would make him more visually distinctive. The original red was replaced with a costume that was primarily yellow with red leggings, gloves and lightning bolt emblem. The ear pieces initially remained yellow, but became red in later issues.

In addition to his appearances within the Flash title, the character was a founding member of the newly created Teen Titans, where he became friends with Dick Grayson, then known as Robin, later known as Nightwing. Sometime later, Wally contracted a mysterious illness that affected his entire bodily system; the more he used his speed powers, the faster his body deteriorated. This could have been caused by one of two things, Wally was a boy when the electrified chemicals altered his body, which was still developing and maturing (as opposed to Barry Allen, who was already an adult when his accident occurred) or when he was struck with a weapon during his time with the Teen Titans. As such, as Wally's body matured, his altered body chemistry was slowly killing him.

=== The Flash ===
During the 1985–1986 miniseries Crisis on Infinite Earths, Barry Allen sacrifices himself to save Earth by destroying an antimatter cannon. Initially unaware of this, Wally is coaxed by Jay Garrick into assisting the heroes against the Anti-Monitor's forces. During the final battle with the Anti-Monitor, Wally is struck by a blast of anti-matter energy, which cures his disease. In the aftermath of the conflict, Wally takes on Barry's costume and identity.

The decision by DC Comics' editorial staff to radically change their fictional universe saw a number of changes to the status quo of the character. Wally West became the new Flash, but less powerful than his predecessor. For example, instead of being able to reach the speed of light, he could run just faster than the speed of sound. Also, the character had to eat vast quantities of food to maintain his metabolism.

Those changes were quickly followed up and 1987 saw the publication of a new Flash comic, initially written by Mike Baron. These stories focused not only on the Flash's superhero exploits, but the state of Wally's wealth. West won a lottery, bought a large mansion, and began dating beautiful women. The character's finances and luck continued to ebb and wane until The Flash vol. 2 #62, when his fortunes stabilized.

Flash vol. 2 #1 (June 1987). Wally West holds as first the Modern Age Flash; art by Jackson Guice.

The 1990s also saw further modifications to the look of the character, with a modified uniform appearing in 1991. This modified costume altered the visual appearance of the traditional Flash costume, with a belt made of two connecting lightning bolts meeting in a "V" at the front (where Allen's costume had a single bolt in a horizontal band), removal of the wings from the top of his boots, a change in the material of his costume (giving it a slight metallic luster), and opaque lenses added to the eyes of his cowl. This modified design utilized elements of the costume designed by artist Dave Stevens for the live-action television series The Flash.

Wally West as The Flash, in his first modernized costume that differentiates from his predecessor's, in The Flash vol. 2 #50 (March 1991). Art by Greg LaRocque.

A difficult encounter was made with a vicious foe, the first Reverse-Flash (Eobard Thawne). Thawne had been killed by Barry Allen shortly before Allen's death, but this version of Thawne was from a time period before he became Allen's enemy. This encounter also served to increase the speed of the character, forcing Wally to push past a psychological block he had placed on his powers. To prevent himself from truly "replacing" Barry, Wally had subconsciously limited his speed so that he could never become his mentor's equal, but when Thawne arrived in the present and briefly posed as Barry Allen, his bragging that he would become the true Flash forced Wally past this block, as he feared Thawne replacing Barry more than he feared himself doing so. After this encounter, he was again Barry Allen's equal in speed, and eventually became even faster. Though he still had not been able to recover Barry's vibrational/phasing abilities for a time (he could vibrate through objects but this would cause the object to explode), he gained several new powers that Barry never had. He was able to share/steal speed, use his speed to kinetically upgrade his attacks, and super heal others. These upgrades resulted in him becoming so powerful that he was even able to defeat physically stronger foes like Mongul, an enemy of Superman.

Writer Mark Waid expanded on the character's powers thematically and further redefined the character by introducing the Speed Force, an energy source that served as a pseudo-scientific explanation for his powers and that of other speedsters. Using this concept as a basis, the character's ability to tap into the Speed Force was used to expand his abilities. The character was now able to lend speed to other objects and people and create a costume directly out of Speed Force energy. Traditional powers such as the ability to vibrate through solid objects were also restored. Because of this, the Flash felt pressured into having to constantly be heroic 24/7. Also during this time, he joined the Justice League. During Waid's run on the character, Wally married his longtime girlfriend, Linda Park.

The 2000s saw writer Geoff Johns revitalize the character by introducing new versions of characters such as Zoom and making significant use of the Rogues. Other changes included restoring the Flash to a secret identity; his identity had been public since shortly after Barry Allen's death, but the traumatic events of his first battle with Zoom prompted Wally to make a deal with the Spectre to erase his identity from public knowledge.

During the Identity Crisis crossover, Wally and Kyle Rayner learned of Doctor Light's mindwipe by the original Justice League and the cause of the villain's transformation from a dangerous serial rapist to an ineffectual buffoon. When Light vows revenge against the League, Wally realizes that the villain is again a powerful threat. He then warns the Teen Titans and Outsiders not to underestimate Light, and later joins their fight against him.

In the miniseries Infinite Crisis, as a narrative device, Wally West and his family were seen leaving for an alternative reality. This allowed the character Bart Allen to become the fourth Flash and headline a relaunched third volume of the title, called The Flash: The Fastest Man Alive.

The critical reaction to this new version of the Flash was mixed and Bart was killed off in the final issue of the short-lived third volume. It was decided that Wally West should return, and the JLA/JSA story "The Lightning Saga" was used to return the character to Earth along with his wife and children, who appear to have aged several years.

The character next appeared in All Flash #1 (2007), seeking vengeance on those who had killed Bart Allen. This was followed by The Flash vol. 2, which resumed publication after the long hiatus with issue #231 (October 2007). The series found the character struggling with trying to raise his two super-powered twins, plagued by accelerated growth and their inexperience in the heroic game, a task made more difficult by Wally's unemployment, his inability to keep a steady job, and the mistrust of the League for his decision to bring two children into the fold. The series was canceled with issue #247 (February 2009).

In Final Crisis, the character was reunited with Barry Allen, who had returned to life. Later, in The Flash: Rebirth, Wally makes modifications on his costume's cowl and emblem to further differentiate himself from Barry.

=== Blackest Night ===
During Blackest Night, Wally West assists Barry Allen in spreading the word to every hero on Earth about the rise of the Black Lantern Corps. When Black Hand brings back Nekron, Barry is attacked by an army of Black Lanterns, while struggling to fight them off, Wally comes to his rescue, bringing with him the Justice League and Teen Titans, Bart Allen, the Kid Flash, among them. The three Flashes fight their way through Black Lanterns and charge at Nekron. Before they can strike, the Black Lantern Guardian Scar attacks them, attempting to convince them into becoming Black Lanterns. Right after, Hal Jordan and the leaders of the seven Lantern Corps arrive to assist. The heroes attack the Black Lanterns, but when Black Hand reanimates Batman's corpse as a Black Lantern, the resulting emotional shock allows the Black Lantern rings to latch onto the resurrected heroes, transforming Superman, Superboy, Wonder Woman, Green Arrow, Black Canary, and Kid Flash into Black Lanterns. Black Lantern Bart Allen attacks Barry Allen, and the two brawl for a moment before Wally fights him off. A pair of Black Lantern Rings then lock onto Barry and Hal. Wally flees with Barry, with Barry telling him to stay and protect himself and Bart. Barry and Hal then flee the scene to avoid becoming Black Lanterns.

=== Return: The New 52 and DC Rebirth ===
Following the 2011 reboot of the DC comics universe, Wally West appears to have never existed. A seemingly new interpretation of Wally West was introduced in The Flash vol. 4 Annual #3. Originally portrayed as the New 52 version of the classic and original character and the biracial son of Rudy West, this biracial Wally, later renamed Ace West to avoid confusion, was retconned in DC Rebirth #1 as being the cousin of Wally West and son of the New 52 Reverse-Flash, Daniel West. Both cousins are explained as having been named after their great-grandfather.

The existence of Wally West is hinted at in the final issue of Titans Hunt, in which the various original Teen Titans remember their bond to each other, but realize that they are still forgetting an important final member of their team. They look out to the ocean as lightning strikes.

Wally West is reintroduced to DC continuity a week later in a DC Rebirth story. The story reveals that following the Flashpoint event, Wally became lost in the Speed Force for 10 years. While trapped, he came to realize that Barry had not been responsible for the mutation of the New Earth universe into Prime Earth. Instead, an unknown entity had used Barry's time-traveling to fundamentally alter reality. The fallout of the "Darkseid War" storyline allowed Wally to try and reach out to his former friends in the hopes of either returning or warning them of the truth. Each attempt caused him to fall further into the Speed Force. After realizing that not even Linda could remember him, Wally sank into desolation and chose to appear before his uncle, Barry, one last time to thank him for the life he had given him. Just before Wally disappeared, Barry remembered him and dragged him out of the Speed Force. Wally's presence integrates his pre-Flashpoint history to the new timeline to accommodate his existence, resetting his past and those who associated with him. Following a tearful reunion, Wally gave Barry his warning of the true source of the universal change and the dangers to come. Although the two decide to keep Wally's return secret from Iris based on Wally's own experience with Linda, Barry encourages him to return to the Titans, but also recommends that he don a new costume to reflect that he is the Flash rather than 'Kid Flash'. Wally goes to the Titans, and through both physical contact to Nightwing, Donna Troy, Arsenal, Tempest, and Lilith Clay with the Speed Force reminding them of their memories with him, creating a new history. After an emotional reunion with his friends, he tells them of the situation. Wally believes that the unknown entity will attack again to prevent them from finding out the truth, which they will do together as Titans.

Directly after the events in Titans: Rebirth, Lilith has Wally repeat the story of his return for her to use it as a means of making the mental connections between him, herself and the Titans stronger. While doing this, she notices the most powerful thought in Wally's mind is that of Linda Park, which sparks various, but supportive, reactions from the other Titans. Nightwing encourages Wally to seek Linda out and try and make new memories with her. Elsewhere, Linda is still puzzled by Wally's sudden presence in her life and decides to investigate him further. During a confrontation with Abra Kadabra, Wally is forced to push himself so fast that he is sent into the Speed Force while trying to save her and the other Titans from being killed by Kadabra, but in a conversation with a manifestation of his memories of Linda, Wally is encouraged not to give up on the idea that he can make a new relationship with her in this timeline, subsequently using his memories of the Titans as a new 'lightning-rod' to return to Earth. Afterwards, Wally is visited by Superman, who confirms that he, like Wally, remembers the world that existed before history was 'edited'.

During the storyline "The Lazarus Contract", Deathstroke intends to use the Speed Force to save his son Grant Wilson and takes out Wally. Ace West and Damian Wayne manage to save Wally, but he is injured and forced to use a pacemaker. After that adventure, while on a mission with the Titans, Wally learned that he has the ability to go fast and stop time as well.

After a battle against Psimon, Mister Twister, and the Key, Wally used too much of his abilities, and he seemingly dies. However, Kid Flash (Ace West) senses Wally's "death" and rushes to find him. After noticing Wally West "dead", Kid Flash senses that Wally is not completely dead and he revives him by jumpstarting his heart, curing Wally of his pacemaker condition. Wally West then helps the Titans defeat Donna Troy's evil self from an alternate future, Troia, and the other villains.

When Barry confronts Wally about how he has not made any real effort to make contact with Iris, rebuild things with Linda, or even try to make a new life for himself, Wally tries to compensate for this by tracking down Frances Kane, but his initial contact with her also re-awakens her old psychological issues, causing her to attack Wally before he calms her down by confessing his own fears about his current circumstances. Inspired by this conversation, Wally calls Dick Grayson to help him purchase an apartment. However, Wally is unaware that his friend-turned-foe Hunter Zolomon has returned. Now in a position of authority in the 25th century, Zolomon sends the Renegades into the past to arrest Iris for the murder of Eobard Thawne with the intention of provoking a war between the Flashes to make 'the true Flash' stronger through tragedy. After the Flash Family defeated Gorilla Grodd in a battle, Wally meets Iris for the first time after his disappearance. He begins remembering pre-Flashpoint memories after Iris remembers him. However, a confrontation with Zolomon provokes Barry and Wally into conflict, as Zolomon convinces Wally that the Speed Force must be destroyed to release those missing allies still 'trapped' within it, including Wally's children, Jai and Iris West, Max Mercury, and Impulse. Despite Barry's efforts, Wally succeeds in breaking the Force Barrier, releasing the Sage Force and the Strength Force. Zoom had discovered the existence of these energies by reading 25th-century history books and manipulated Wally into releasing them.

==== Heroes in Crisis ====
During the "Heroes in Crisis" story arc, Wally is believed to have been killed in an attack on the Sanctuary therapy center. It is later revealed that Wally suffered a mental breakdown, which released a burst of Speed Force energy that killed many of Sanctuary's patients.

In The Flash #761, it was revealed that Eobard Thawne was responsible for manipulating Wally into killing the heroes at Sanctuary. It is later elaborated that the Sanctuary patients had survived the attack and that the Speed Force caused the explosion while trying to expel Savitar.

==== Doomsday Clock ====
In Doomsday Clock, Lex Luthor mentioned to Lois Lane that someone has been undermining creation, like what Doctor Manhattan did with Wally West and the Justice Society of America. When Manhattan altered the multiverse and created the New 52 Universe, Wally, prior to being freed in DC Universe: Rebirth #1, briefly escaped the Speed Force to warn Manhattan that he knows what the latter did and that the heroes of the DC Universe will stop him. Wally was pulled back into the Speed Force afterward.

==== Flash-Forward and Generation ====
Wally is later recruited by Tempus Fuginaut who wants him to restore the balance between the Light and Dark Multiverses. After saving several universes from being consumed by dark-matter, Wally finds the Mobius Chair that once belonged to Metron and makes a deal with Fuginaut to return his children Jai and Iris, who were trapped in the Dark Multiverse, to his wife Linda Park. But after sitting upon the chair, Wally, in addition to obtaining a cosmic level of knowledge, also obtains the powers of Doctor Manhattan, after he put a fraction of his power into the chair. Wally's costume and lightning proceeded to turn to the blue of Manhattan, with Manhattan's logo forming on his forehead, and Wally now losing nearly all sense of emotion he had and now seeking logic and knowledge. After finding out that Manhattan did not completely heal the universe after Doomsday Clock, Wally uses his powers to restore the timeline.

=== Infinite Frontier ===
Following the 2021 event Infinite Frontier #0, Wally is restored as the primary Flash and central character in The Flash series since #768, after Barry Allen's departure to join Justice Incarnate, eventually again donning the costume he designed during The Flash: Rebirth events. Wally's first storyline in the solo title sees him travel through the timeline as he attempts to prevent a destructive release of something in the Speed Force, which sees him meet his daughter, Iris, in the future as an accomplished Flash. In the arc's conclusion, in The Flash Annual 2021, Wally is thrown back to the moment of his greatest torment: the explosion at Sanctuary which killed his friends. He is unburdened by the revelation that this was not his fault, but rather that of the same Speed Force phenomenon, caused by the mad speedster Savitar and the Speed Force's attempts to expel him from its interior. With help from Mister Terrific, Barry Allen, Green Arrow, and the past Roy Harper shortly before he died at Sanctuary, Wally brings Savitar to the present. Although Savitar easily overcomes Superman and Batman, Barry tells Wally to step up, making use of his superior bond to the Speed Force to defeat, depower, and imprison Savitar once again. Fully redeemed and more powerful than ever, Wally returns to Linda and the kids, enthusiastic to serve as Central City's Flash once again. Sometime later, Wally reunites with a resurrected Roy at the Teen Titans Academy.

== Powers and abilities ==
Wally's primary superpower is his ability to control the speed at which his body vibrates and to move and think at superhuman speed, which he uses primarily to run at extreme superhuman velocities. His power originates from his connection to the Speed Force, an extra-dimensional energy source from which most speedsters gain their powers. Wally is the fastest version of Flash, to the extent that he became faster than the Speed Force itself.

While most to all speedsters can make a connection and draw upon this force, Wally "mainlines" power from the Speed Force itself and cannot be cut off from the source. This connection to the Speed Force grants him unique abilities that other speedsters lack, such as lending and taking speed. His ability to manipulate speed allows him to boost metabolism, allowing the recipient to rapidly heal from injuries. Wally is also able to absorb kinetic energy in a less direct manner. He once absorbed the kinetic energy of Earth while standing at the North Pole when his teammates were forced to move the planet to prevent possible earthquakes.

Like all Flashes, Wally is surrounded by a protective aura that allows him to resist the heat created by the pressure of compressed air caused by moving at super speed as well as other environmental consequences of moving at such velocities. It is not known how Wally is able to circumvent the damage moving at such great speeds would normally have on the environment, but it has been hypothesized that his protective aura allows him to "sidestep" such environmental consequences. Because of his powers and connection to the Speed Force, he can run at varying speeds for extended periods of time without needing rest or causing damage to his body. Wally's connection to the Speed Force constantly rejuvenates him, preventing him from consuming his own body to fuel his powers. Despite this, Wally has a sped-up metabolism and finds it necessary to eat often and in great quantities to help supply the chemical energy needed.

Using his abilities, Wally can run at such speed that he can run on water, create powerful vortexes with his arms or body, and vibrate at such speeds that he becomes invisible to the naked eye. Wally can also match the vibrational constant of solid objects and vibrate through them, passing his molecules through the spaces in between the atoms and molecules of the matter he is vibrating through. Initially, Wally accidentally destabilized whatever he passed through, causing it to explode. In post-Rebirth stories, Wally became able to vibrate through objects without causing them to explode.

Instead of using the cosmic treadmill as his uncle Barry, Wally can use his speed to travel through time. In Flash #150, he traveled back to the events of Crisis on Infinite Earths and battled the Anti-Monitor, speed-blitzing him until his shell was destroyed. He also outran death to the edge of the universe and beyond, where death did not exist, and continued to run to get Linda back. The Flash vol 2 #177 had Wally outrun the gravitational pull of a black hole. Using Jesse Quick's speed formula combined with his speed steal, Wally can temporally accelerate to the point where he escapes linear time.

Wally is also a skilled science prodigy. In some versions, Wally uses these skills to recreate the accident that gave Barry his powers by himself, granting himself his own powers. Like his mentor, Wally understands what his speed enables him to do, and uses his knowledge of physics to his advantage in battle. He has extensive knowledge and experience with Time-Travel and the Multiverse, and was also considered by Michael Holt, aka Mister Terrific, to be one of the smartest people he knew, and was given a job as a mechanic/engineer at TerrificTech.

After his return to the DC Universe, Wally is said to be even faster than before. Titans (2016) established that the Speed Force is inside Wally more than ever before. He can generate white lightning, which combines all the colors of the Speed Force. Also in DC Rebirth, Wally learned that he can sense when time has been manipulated, as well as listen to the Speed Force, which allows him to sense disruptions in the space-time continuum. In the sixth volume of The Flash (2023), Wally gains the ability to create Speed Force energy constructs and duplicate himself.

Wally is a talented fighter in his own right and was trained in hand-to-hand combat by people like Barry Allen and Dick Grayson while training people like Bart Allen and his own children as a fighter. He is known to often use Judo in his fighting style.

== Allies and friends ==
Wally's father, Rudolph West (a Manhunter agent), was presumed deceased following an explosion in Cuba during the Invasion series. He reappeared years later at, among other places, his ex-wife Mary West's (Wally's mother) second wedding. They both later attended Wally and Linda's wedding. Wally also has an older brother-like relationship with his younger cousin Wallace, whom he sometimes refers to as "Ace". Wally's kids Jai and Irey also consider Ace to be their uncle.

Wally's best friend is Dick Grayson, who was the first Robin and current Nightwing. Wally and Dick became close as founding members of both the Teen Titans and the Titans. Their respective mentors, Barry Allen and Bruce Wayne, are also good friends and frequently team up with each other, meaning that when Wally was Kid Flash and Dick was Robin, the two often accompanied their mentors and each other when Bruce and Barry worked together. Dick later served as the best man at Wally and Linda's wedding.

Similar to the friendship of Barry Allen / Flash and Hal Jordan / Green Lantern, Wally West is also close friends with Kyle Rayner, his generation's Green Lantern. Wally is also close friends with other Green Lanterns like John Stewart and Hal, who often looked out for Wally even while he was the Spectre.

While they disagree regularly, Wally has developed an odd friendship/respect with Bruce Wayne / Batman (Bruce is also Dick's adoptive father), who has more than once made it clear that those feelings are mutual.

The members of the New Teen Titans, the team Wally served on as Kid Flash, have reappeared several times throughout his life. Although they are not always in close contact with one another, the team consider each other family; Wally is no exception.

=== Supporting cast ===
Wally has developed an extensive supporting cast over the duration of his comic series that began in 1987. A few are former villains and adversaries, such as Pied Piper, Speed Demon, and Chunk.

- Linda Park – Wally West's girlfriend and later wife. She is a Korean-American television reporter for Keystone City, although she later goes to medical school. Park is West's "lightning rod" when traveling in the Speed Force. She first appeared in The Flash (vol. 2) #28 and was created by William Messner-Loebs.
- Mary West – Wally's mother.
- Iris West – Wally's aunt, returned from the future. Iris was a role model for Wally growing up and one of the inspirations behind his career as the Flash.
- Dr. Tina McGee – A scientist/nutritionist with whom Wally had a brief romantic involvement.
- Dr. Jerry McGee (a.k.a. Speed Demon, Speed McGee) – Tina's husband and former super-speed villain.
- Frances Kane (a.k.a. Magenta) – A former love interest of West who later joins the Rogues and becomes a supervillain.
- Connie Noleski – A model and girlfriend of Wally's in his early career as the Flash. She is currently married to Chunk.
- Chester P. Runk (a.k.a. Chunk) – A brilliant physicist who became a walking black hole after a matter-transmitting machine he invented imploded during its first test.
- Mason Trollbridge – The former kid sidekick of a hard-edged Depression-era crimefighter known as the Clipper.
- Pied Piper – One of Barry Allen's former Rogues whom Wally and Linda befriended. Piper even confessed his homosexuality to Wally on a rooftop while in discussion with him about the Joker.
- Jay Garrick – The original Flash. Currently out of semi-retirement and a member of the Justice Society of America.
- Jesse Quick – The daughter of Liberty Belle and Johnny Quick, Jesse is a second generation superhero and speedster like her father.
- Max Mercury – The Zen Master of Speed.
- Bart Allen (Impulse) – Barry and Iris Allen's grandson from the future. Primarily known as Impulse, Bart has also assumed the mantles of Kid Flash and the Flash.
- Ashley Zolomon – Current Rogue Profiler with the Keystone City PD and former wife of Hunter Zolomon.
- Jai and Irey West – Wally and Linda's twins. Due to an unstable connection to the Speed Force, Irey and Jai are physically 13 1/2 years old, but only a few years old chronologically. Wally had to teach them at super-speed, so they are mentally about the same age as they are physically. Following their nearly being killed by their powers, all of it was transferred to Iris, who became the new Impulse. Jai was still able to access his connection through her but it caused him much pain, something his father later fixed by giving him access to a surge within the Speed Force. In response, he took on the name Surge, though he later quit being a superhero. Irey eventually took on the new identity of Thunderheart.
- Wade West – Wally and Linda's infant son.
- Professor Pilgrim – A potential future version of Wade West who has become a time traveler and is training his older brother in the use of his powers, among other things.

=== Group Affiliations ===
Wally is a founding member of the Teen Titans, the New Teen Titans, the Titans, Justice League Europe, Justice League Task Force, the "JLA" incarnation of the Justice League, and Justice League Elite, among other affiliations.

== Other versions ==
Many alternate universe versions of Wally West have appeared throughout the character's publication history. In Kingdom Come, West is the godlike embodiment of the Speed Force and a member of Superman's Justice League. In Flashpoint, West is an assistant and cameraman for his aunt Iris before being killed by Citizen Cold. In Teen Titans: Earth One, West gained his powers from the Titans Project headed by Niles Caulder. In Absolute Flash, West is fifteen years old and gained powers from an experiment conducted by Barry Allen. His powers are not derived from the Speed Force, but a darker force created by Darkseid.

== In other media ==
=== Television ===
Wally West / Flash as depicted in Justice League

- Wally West as Kid Flash appears in The Superman/Aquaman Hour of Adventure, voiced by Tommy Cook. This version has black hair, an inverted version of his second comics costume, and trunks.
- Wally West as the Flash appears in series set in the DC Animated Universe (DCAU), voiced initially by Charlie Schlatter and subsequently by Michael Rosenbaum. This version works as a CSI like Barry Allen and is a founding member of the Justice League. First appearing in the Superman: The Animated Series episode "Speed Demons", he subsequently appears in Justice League, the Static Shock two-part episode "A League of Their Own", and Justice League Unlimited.
- Wally West as Kid Flash appears in Teen Titans, voiced again by Michael Rosenbaum.
- Wally West as Kid Flash appears in Batman: The Brave and the Bold, voiced by Hunter Parrish. This version is a member of Justice League International.
- Wally West as Kid Flash appears in the first two seasons of Young Justice, voiced by Jason Spisak. This version is a founding member of the "Team" and best friend of Dick Grayson who gained his powers from an attempt to recreate the accidents that gave Barry Allen and Jay Garrick theirs. West later enters a relationship with Artemis Crock and retires from crime-fighting, but is called back into action to help the Team and Justice League thwart the Reach's invasion, during which he is killed by a Reach weapon.
- Wally West as Kid Flash appears in Teen Titans Go!, voiced by Will Friedle.
- Wally West as Kid Flash makes a non-speaking cameo appearance in DC Nation Shorts.
- Wally West as the Flash appears in the Mad segment "That's What Super Friends Are For".
- Wally West as Kid Flash appears in the Robot Chicken episode "Bring a Sidekick to Work Day", voiced by Seth Green.

=== Film ===
- Wally West as Kid Flash makes a non-speaking appearance in Justice League: The New Frontier.
- Wally West as the Flash appears in Justice League: Crisis on Two Earths, voiced by Josh Keaton.
- Wally West as Kid Flash appears in Teen Titans: The Judas Contract, voiced again by Jason Spisak.
- Wally West as the Flash makes a non-speaking appearance in Batman: Death in the Family.
- Wally West as the Flash makes a non-speaking appearance in Space Jam: A New Legacy.
- Wally West as Kid Flash makes a non-speaking appearance in Batman and Superman: Battle of the Super Sons.

=== Video games ===
- Wally West as the Flash appears as a playable character in Justice League Task Force.
- Wally West as the Flash appears as a playable character in Justice League Heroes, voiced by Chris Edgerly. Additionally, Walter West / Dark Flash appears as an alternate costume.
- Wally West as the Flash appears in Justice League Heroes: The Flash, voiced again by Chris Edgerly.
- Wally West as the Flash appears in DC Universe Online.
- Wally West as the Flash appears in LittleBigPlanet 2, voiced by David Menkin.
- Wally West as Kid Flash appears as a playable character in Young Justice: Legacy, voiced again by Jason Spisak.
- Wally West as Kid Flash and the Flash appears as a character summon in Scribblenauts Unmasked: A DC Comics Adventure.
- The DC Rebirth incarnation of Wally West / Flash appears as a playable character in the mobile version of Injustice: Gods Among Us.
- Wally West as the Flash makes a cameo appearance in Barry Allen's ending in Injustice 2.
- The DC Rebirth incarnation of Wally West / Flash and the Young Justice incarnation of Wally West / Kid Flash appear as playable characters in Lego DC Super-Villains, both voiced again by Jason Spisak.
- The DC Rebirth incarnation of Wally West / Flash appears as an unlockable playable character in DC Legends: Battle for Justice.

== Reception ==
In 2011, IGN ranked Wally West #8 on their list of the "Top 100 Super Heroes of All Time", ahead of other speedster heroes, stating that "Wally West is one of the DCU's greatest heroes, even if he does not rank as the original Scarlet Speedster". In 2013, Wally West placed 6th on IGN's Top 25 Heroes of DC Comics, also ahead of other speedsters.
