= Gnarrk =

Publication information
- Publisher: DC Comics
- First appearance: Teen Titans #32 (April 1971)
- Created by: Bob Haney, George Tuska

In-story information
- Alter ego: John Gnarrk
- Species: Neanderthal
- Team affiliations: Teen Titans
- Notable aliases: Caveboy
- Abilities: Superhuman strength, agility, reflexes, endurance and durability; Enhanced climbing skills; Limited human intelligence

Gnarrk is a fictional character in DC Comics. He is a caveman who has been a member of various versions of the Teen Titans in the comic books in the early 1970s.

== Fictional character biography ==
=== Pre-Crisis ===
In pre-Crisis on Infinite Earths continuity, Gnarrk is a time-displaced Neanderthal stranded in the present. Through love and telepathic communication, Lilith Clay teaches Gnarrk human language and customs. Later, both retire from the Teen Titans to live together, apparently as a couple. Later, Gnarrk and Lilith briefly join Teen Titans West before it disbands. Several years later at Donna Troy's wedding, Lilith mentions that Gnarrk has died under unspecified circumstances.

=== Post-Crisis ===
In post-Crisis continuity, Gnarrk is a Cro-Magnon who gains enhanced intelligence from a comet shard embedded in his chest. Soon afterward, the shard protects him from a volcanic eruption by encasing him in ice for centuries. However, he remains conscious and uses the shard's abilities to remotely cure disease and control the forces of nature to benefit mankind.

Based on psychic flashes from Lilith Clay, the Teen Titans travel to Southeast Asia, where they find Gnarrk still encased in ice. Lilith uses her powers to establish a mental rapport with Gnarrk. He tells her his name, and she learns of his origins and his noble intentions.

The Titans bring Gnarrk back to S.T.A.R. Labs and learn that he is dying for unknown reasons. The S.T.A.R. scientists intend to dissect him, but the Titans prevent them from doing so. Gnarrk remains on life support for a year before dying; after he dies, the crystal in his body loses its powers.

=== The New 52 ===
In post-New 52 continuity, Gnarrk is a member of the original incarnation of the Teen Titans. Nothing is known about his past or origins, though Gnarrk is shown fully integrated into society when he meets Roy Harper, when the two meet. Along with Hank Hall and Dawn Granger, Roy and Gnarrk are met by Lilith. Lilith explains how they were the original Teen Titans and how she was forced to erase their memories of their group and each other to protect them after their souls became entangled with an occult ritual conducted by Mister Twister.

During the Heroes in Crisis storyline, Gnarrk appears as a patient at the therapy center Sanctuary. He is among the heroes who are killed in an unexpected attack. It is later revealed that the hero Goldbug replaced all of the dead heroes with clones from the 31st century and that they are all actually alive.

== Powers and abilities ==
As a Cro-Magnon, Gnarrk possesses superhuman strength, dexterity, and endurance. He also has limited psychic abilities derived from the crystal embedded in his chest.

== In other media ==
- Gnarrk appears in Teen Titans, voiced by Dee Bradley Baker. This version is an honorary member of the Teen Titans who is friends with Kole and lives with her in an isolated Arctic cavern to prevent her powers from being used for evil.
- The Teen Titans animated series incarnation of Gnarrk appears in Teen Titans Go!.
- Gnarrk appears as a character summon in Scribblenauts Unmasked: A DC Comics Adventure.
