= Bunker (character) =

- Bunker from Teen Titans vol. 4, #1 (artist Brett Booth).

Publication information
- Publisher: DC Comics
- First appearance: Teen Titans vol. 4, #1 (November 2011)
- Created by: Scott Lobdell (writer); Brett Booth (artist)

In-story information
- Alter ego: Miguel Jose Barragan
- Species: Metahuman
- Team affiliations: Teen Titans; Justice League; Justice League Queer
- Abilities: Energy constructs

Bunker (Miguel Barragan) is a fictional superhero of Mexican descent, published by DC Comics. He first appeared in Teen Titans vol. 4, #1 (November 2011), and was created by Scott Lobdell and Brett Booth.

Booth said on his blog:

We wanted to show an interesting character whose homosexuality is part of him, not something that's hidden. Sure there are gay people who you wouldn't know are gay right off the bat, but there are others who are a more flamboyant, and we thought it would be nice to actually see them portrayed in comics. Did we go over the top, I don't think so.

== Fictional character biography ==
Bunker first appeared as a member of the Teen Titans in Teen Titans vol. 4, #1, as part of The New 52, a reboot of DC's continuity and timeline.

Raised in the Mexican village El Chilar, Miguel Barragan grew up in a loving and supportive community, and found acceptance as an openly gay teenager. When Miguel manifested the metahuman ability to create psionic energy constructs, he sought out Red Robin in an attempt to become a full-fledged superhero.

Miguel – who adopts the code-name "Bunker" – is targeted by N.O.W.H.E.R.E., a mysterious organization abducting super-powered youths for their purposes. Red Robin makes contact with Bunker and organizes a group of targeted teenagers into a resistance force known as the Teen Titans. Together, they liberate Superboy and dismantle N.O.W.H.E.R.E.’s secret complex in the Antarctic.

In July 2012, Lobdell announced that he was going to reveal Bunker's boyfriend, "who will be heading to the US from Mexico after coming out of a coma and learning that his boyfriend had run off to become a superhero".

In issue #23, Bunker leaves the team for a short while. The Teen Titans series then concluded, with #30 along with an annual in April 2014. The series was later relaunched in July with a new issue #1, written by Will Pfeifer and art by Kenneth Rocafort.

In the annual, during an epilogue, Bunker is shown being funded by the Green Team to create the 'Spectacular Internationale'.

== Powers and abilities ==
Bunker has the ability to create energy constructs with his mind, often creating brick-like walls and pummeling fists. His constructs manifest as purple bricks. He has full control over their density, being able to make them soft to cushion impacts or falls, or hard as rock to inflict damage. He can create a wide variety of shapes including pillars, shields, body armor, platforms to levitate himself and others, etc. He has also been shown launching his bricks as projectiles.

== In other media ==
- Bunker makes non-speaking cameo appearances in DC Super Hero Girls as a student at Super Hero High.
- In 2013, a HeroClix figure of Bunker was produced as part of the Teen Titans set.
