= Lilith Clay =

- Lilith Clay; art by George Pérez (centre), Nick Cardy (top), and George Tuska (bottom).

Publication information
- Publisher: DC Comics
- First appearance: Teen Titans #25 (February 1970)
- Created by: Robert Kanigher; Nick Cardy

In-story information
- Alter ego: Lilith Clay
- Species: Metahuman
- Team affiliations: Teen Titans; Justice League
- Partnerships: Donna Troy; Power Girl
- Notable aliases: Omen; Lilith
- Abilities: Several mental abilities, including precognition, pyrokinesis, advanced telepathy, telekinesis, and teleportation.

Lilith Clay, also known as Omen, is a superheroine appearing in American comic books published by DC Comics. Created by Robert Kanigher and Nick Cardy, Lilith made her first appearance in Teen Titans #25 (February 1970) and commonly appears as a member of the eponymous group. She is depicted as the best friend of Donna Troy (the first Wonder Girl) and the second hero to join the original Teen Titans after its founders, following Roy Harper (the first Speedy). Although her origin and powers have varied significantly throughout her history, she is consistently seen as both precognitive and psychic.

== Fictional character biography ==
=== Pre-Crisis ===
Lilith Clay is a metahuman who manifested psychic superpowers at the age of 13. After reading her parents' minds, Lilith learns that she is adopted and leaves home to find her birth parents. Lilith joins the Teen Titans, but later leaves the team and becomes a founding member of Titans West.

Prior to the disbanding of the original Teen Titans and Titans West, Lilith has a vision of her teammate Donna Troy (Wonder Girl) marrying a red-headed man, who is murdered along with their child. At the time, Donna is dating her teammate (and red head) Roy Harper. Fearing Lilith's prophecy, Donna breaks up with Roy.

Lilith later manifests pyrokinesis, which alerts her birth mother, Thia, of her daughter's location. Thia kidnaps Lilith and reveals that Lilith is one of many children who she sired to do her bidding. Lilith helps the Titans defeat Thia and stays on Mount Olympus, where she is recognized as a demigod.

=== Post-Crisis ===
In Dan Jurgens' Teen Titans series (1996), Lilith operates under the codename Omen and works for Loren Jupiter, the sponsor of the Teen Titans. Omen is unmasked as Lilith after being captured by the supervillain Haze and is revealed to be the illegitimate daughter of Loren Jupiter and the half-sister of Haze. As Omen, Lilith possesses telekinesis and the ability to create illusions.

During the storyline Titans/Young Justice: Graduation Day, the Teen Titans are attacked by an android from the future called Indigo who accidentally activates a Superman android believed to be long destroyed. The rampaging android kills Lilith and Donna Troy, causing the Titans to disband.

In the Blackest Night event, Lilith is resurrected as a member of the Black Lantern Corps and attacks the Titans. Her body is destroyed by a burst of white light emanating from Dawn Granger.

=== The New 52 ===
A new incarnation of Omen appears in the series "The Culling" as an agent of the villainous organization N.O.W.H.E.R.E. Omen possesses the ability to create illusions and control the minds of others. This makes her a valuable member of N.O.W.H.E.R.E., as she enforces Harvest's will amongst his henchmen and prisoners, conditioning and preparing them for the Culling.

The original Lilith Clay is reintroduced in DC Rebirth as a drug counselor who has been secretly keeping tabs on Roy Harper, Donna Troy, Dick Grayson, Mal Duncan, Karen Beecher, Hank Hall, and Gnarrk. It is revealed that Lilith and those she has been watching were founding members of the Teen Titans until they fell victim to the villain Mister Twister, who ensnarled them in an occult ritual that threatened the world. To stop the ritual, Lilith erased all memories the Titans had of their existence and of each other. When Mister Twister resurfaced and restored their memories, Lilith began attempting to gather the Titans together to stop their enemy once and for all.

In Dawn of DC, Lilith and Power Girl establish a psychic counseling service where Power Girl enters the minds of others and physically defeats their problems.

== Powers and abilities ==
Lilith Clay possesses various psychic abilities, including telepathy, precognition, and energy projection. Furthermore, she can teleport and generate illusions and fire.

In the 2024 Power Girl series, she uses her psychic powers to conjure giant telekinetic fists and flying disks, similar to a Green Lantern power ring.
