= Multiverse (DC Comics) =

Multiverse used by DC Comics

Map of the New 52 Multiverse

In most of the DC Comics media, the Multiverse is a "cosmic construct" that is composed of the many universes the stories of DC media take place in. The worlds within the multiverse share a space and fate in common, and its structure has changed several times in the history of DC Comics.

== History ==
=== Golden Age ===
The concept of a universe and a multiverse in which the fictional stories take place was loosely established during the Golden Age of Comic Books (1938–1956). With the publication of All-Star Comics #3 in 1940, the first crossover between characters occurred with the creation of the Justice Society of America (JSA), which presented the first superhero team with characters appearing in other publications (comic strips and anthology titles) to bring attention to less-known characters. This established the first shared "universe", as all these heroes now lived in the same world. Prior to this publication, characters from the different comic books seemingly existed in different worlds.

Later, Wonder Woman #59 (May 1953) presented DC Comics' first story depicting a parallel "mirror" world. Wonder Woman is transported to a twin Earth where she meets Tara Terruna, who is exactly like her. Tara Terruna means "Wonder Woman" in the native language of that world. Wonder Woman describes this world as being a twin world existing alongside Earth with duplicates of everyone but with a different development. The concept of different versions of the world and its heroes was revisited in the pages of Wonder Woman a few times later.

=== Silver Age ===
A depiction of several alternate Earths within the original DC Multiverse before the events of Crisis on Infinite Earths and the variations of the Flash inhabiting each Earth, art by Dan Jurgens and Art Thibert.

Led by editor Julius Schwartz and writer Gardner Fox, DC Comics' superheroes were given a "reboot" with the publication of Showcase #4 in 1956, where a new version of the Flash made his first appearance. This is considered the beginning period of the Silver Age of Comic Books. The success of this new Flash led to the creation of new incarnations of the Golden Age characters who only shared the names and powers but had different secret identities, origins and stories. Later, new versions of other heroes, Superman, Batman and Wonder Woman, were also restarted by retelling their origins but keeping their secret identities. Fox, who worked before in the creation of the JSA, where other heroes met for the first time, created the story "Flash of Two Worlds" in The Flash #123 (1961), where Barry Allen, the new Flash, is transported to the Earth where the original Flash, Jay Garrick, existed. To Barry, Jay Garrick's world was a work of fiction as it was in the real world. This story not only presented the encounter of two worlds and the existence of the Multiverse for the first time, but it also presented key features of the Multiverse: all the universes vibrate at a specific frequency which keeps them separated; these "barriers" could be trespassed by "tuning" to that vibration. Because people could also "tune-in" these worlds in dreams, some people wrote comic books with the stories from those worlds they dreamed, which explained why Barry knew about Jay as a fictional character.

The success of this story led to the first team crossover between the new Justice League of America (JLA) and the Golden Age JSA, in the stories "Crisis on Earth-One" (Justice League of America #21) and "Crisis on Earth-Two" (Justice League of America #22), published in late 1963. This story arc started the tradition of a yearly crossover between the JLA and the JSA, and established the concept of a Multiverse and the designation of names, Earth-One being the JLA reality and Earth-Two the JSA reality. The success of these crossovers spawned publications telling the further stories of the Golden Age heroes in the present-day parting from many of the stories told, thus establishing a more defined continuity for every universe.

This concept of parallel Earths with differences in locations, persons and historical events became a very important ingredient within DC Comics' publications. It helped (among other things) to explain continuity errors, to retell and retcon stories, and to incorporate foreign elements that could actively interact with everything else and allow them to have an "existence". Continuity flaws between the established Earth-Two and several stories from the Golden Age were given separate Earths. "Imaginary" stories and sometime divergences of Earth-One were given also separate realities (such as Earth-B and Earth-A). In addition to the stories appearing mainly in the pages of JLA that created new Earths, the acquisition of other comic book companies and characters by DC Comics incorporated these new properties as Earths in the Multiverse which would interact several times with the "main" Earths, One and Two; two of the most notable being Earth-S for the Fawcett Comics characters, and Earth-X for the Quality Comics characters. By the 1970s, everything that was published or related officially to DC Comics' titles could become part of the Multiverse, although much of it remained largely uncatalogued.

The names of the worlds were usually in the format Earth, hyphen, spelled numeral/letter/name. In the case of worlds with numerals, the "rule" of spelling the number was not always followed, even within the pages of the same issue.

=== Crisis on Infinite Earths ===
As the 50th anniversary of DC Comics drew near, major events were proposed for the celebration: an encyclopedia (Who's Who in the DC Universe) and a crossover of the ages, characters, and worlds appearing in DC's comics. As told in the letter section of Crisis on Infinite Earths #1, as the research started in the late 1970s, it became evident that there were many flaws in continuity. The way used to circumvent some of these errors was the "Multiple Earths", which also showed a chaotic nature that brought even more continuity problems that were not easily explained or were simply left unexplained. Examples of this included: 1) the Black Canary of Earth-One being the daughter of the original Black Canary, who was a resident of Earth-Two, and 2) the existence of Golden Age comic books on Earth-One and the people not noticing that some of the characters in those comic books existed in "real life". In addition, many universes had multiple alternate timelines, such as Kamandi and the Legion of Super-Heroes both being from Earth-One.

Writer Marv Wolfman took this crossover event as an opportunity to reform all the fictional universe of DC Comics to avoid further continuity errors and update the DC characters to modern times. The whole Multiverse is destroyed except for five Earths (the Silver Age's Earth-One, the Golden Age's Earth-Two, Charlton Comics' Earth-Four, Fawcett Comics' Earth-S and Quality Comics' Freedom Fighters' Earth-X). Later, the universe is recreated as one single universe with elements of the surviving five.

The crossover event Convergence (2015) officially retconned the events of Crisis after heroes in that series went back in time to prevent the collapse of the Multiverse.

=== Modern Age ===
==== DC Comics ====
After the conclusion of Crisis on Infinite Earths, the concept of a single Universe containing most elements of the "surviving Earths" was established and heavily enforced to avoid the continuity problems of the Multiverse. However, alternate realities that affected the new DC Universe appeared very quickly. In Superman (vol. 2) #8, a Universe inside the Universe was revealed to have been created to preserve the Legion of Super Heroes' 30th century in New Earth. This world was used to allow crossovers with certain characters of the Legion of Super-Heroes and recreate characters that otherwise could not exist in the new continuity (such as Kryptonians, as in the New Earth Superman was the only survivor of Krypton). Alternate timelines were also used, the most notable event being Armageddon 2001 in 1991. An Antimatter Universe existed as well, which had some "reversed" events in a similar way as the former Earth-Three. The Earth within this Universe was called "Earth 2". In addition, there was a Limbo, where some heroes and characters that could not be brought back to "existence" after the Crisis on Infinite Earths lived outside the Universe.

An important rule in the new DC Universe was that there could only be one timeline, so any change caused by time travelers caused the destruction of their timelines of origin. Changes in the past were often "fixed" or have to comply with the present to prevent continuity errors.

Nevertheless, continuity errors appeared. The retold origin of Hawkman presented errors regarding the existence of the Golden Age version (Carter Hall) and the Silver Age version (Katar Hol) in the same continuity without explanation. The interaction of "possible timelines" also created continuity holes. This led to a new crisis to address the problem, titled Zero Hour: Crisis in Time!. The resulting universe had a slightly re-written story with no continuity errors even though it was acknowledged that reality-shattering events did happen (including Crisis on Infinite Earths). This Universe kept the concept of one universe, one timeline. Such a timeline was "mapped" from the beginning to the present (1994) at the back cover of Zero Hour #0 that also included certain key dates in the future.

The need to publish stories outside the strict DC Universe continuity led to the creation of certain DC imprints. Stories that set DC characters in different situations after the Crisis on Infinite Earths, were published by DC Comics under the Elseworlds imprint. None of these stories were ever intended to be included in the "real" continuity of the DC Universe.

Certain characters were reinvented in a mature context and were published under the Vertigo imprint. Most of the times, the characters depicted within the Vertigo imprint had no relation to the original DC Universe's versions, nor did the events have influence over the new Universe.

Later, under a special publishing deal with Milestone Media, DC Comics published a new series of comic books that told the stories of the heroes living in Dakota City, formed mostly by African American superheroes and other minorities. These characters lived in a universe separated from the DC Universe (known as the Dakotaverse or Milestone Universe). The event Worlds Collide presented one of the first modern intercompany crossovers within the established continuity of the Universes instead of being "imaginary" and showed that there could be other universes or even multiverses outside the new DC Universe.

In a similar way to Worlds Collide, the crossover event DC vs. Marvel showed another in-continuity crossover with another reality completely separated from the DC Universe and that has a Multiverse of its own: the universe of Earth-616 in the Marvel Multiverse.

The universes were rarely referred to with specific names within the stories but were named in the "Real World" (both officially and unofficially) using the name of the editorial, imprint or even an element in particular. While in the comic books the concept of a "real" Multiverse was avoided, the Multiverse played an important role in cartoon series and live-action shows.

In summary, from 1986 to 1999, everything not happening in the "mainstream" continuity appearing in DC comics was either a non-canonical story or happened in a completely different and separate reality/universe/multiverse.

In 1999, the success of Elseworlds' Kingdom Come and other stories, led to the creation of the concept known as Hypertime in order to publish crossovers with those characters and the mainstream continuity. This structure gave "existence" to alternate timelines, stories in Elseworlds, appearances in other media and any other appearance of DC characters in the past. The main timeline or "Central Timeline" was like a river and all of the alternate stories were branches of it. Hypertime was similar to the former Multiverse as it allowed each and every reality ever published to co-exist and interact as most branches tend to return to the original stream (explaining some retcons as well as crossovers). However, all realities existed within only one Universe.

==== WildStorm ====
Originally, the stories appearing in WildStorm Productions' comic books occurred in a universe that was part of the Image Universe along with other characters appearing in Image Comics publications. It was separated from it during the event called "Shattered Image" consolidating the separate WildStorm Universe which had its own multiversal structure. After the purchase of WildStorm by DC Comics, crossovers occurred with the new DC Universe, which were still separated just like Milestone and Marvel.

=== 21st century ===
==== 52 ====
In 2005, a new universal crisis story arc was published as a way to update once more the superheroes of DC Comics, bring together other "realities" (namely, Milestone and Wildstorm) and bring back the Multiverse, this time with a limited number of Earths instead of an infinite one.

During the event Infinite Crisis, the Universe was "splintered" and the original Multiverse was restored briefly, showing that the entire Hypertime and many other appearances of the DC characters were part of the original Multiverse, including Tangent Comics which were published 12 years after the Multiverse was no more. In the end of Infinite Crisis, the multiverse is merged back as a New Earth with a new continuity with many stories re-written and many others from the Modern Age still happening.

In parallel, Captain Atom: Armageddon tells the story of how Captain Atom of the DC Universe causes the recreation of the Wildstorm Universe upon its destruction (and possibly its Multiverse as well). The recreated universe became part of the newly recreated DC Universe.

The aftermath of Infinite Crisis and Captain Atom: Armageddon (52, Countdown to Final Crisis and Final Crisis) showed that a new Multiverse was created. The new Multiverse consisted of 52 positive matter universes, an Antimatter Universe and a Limbo. The main continuity still occurred in New Earth (also called Earth-0), Earths 1, 2, 3, 4, 5 and 10 resembled Earths One, Two, Three, Four, S, and X of the original Multiverse respectively. Earths 13 and 50 were Vertigo and the rebooted Wildstorm Universe, while Earth-17 became the world of a revived post-apocalypse Atomic Knights after a mid-80s World War III once more. Many important stories from the Elseworlds imprint were later also given their own alternate Earths within this new Multiverse.

In the miniseries, Milestone Forever, in a similar fashion as Captain Atom: Armageddon, the events that led to the end of the Dakotaverse and its integration to the new DC continuity are revealed. Most of the stories that were told in Milestone Comics publications now occurred in New Earth and the Dakotaverse ceased to exist as a separated Universe.

A naming convention was established and followed this time in the format Earth, hyphen, numeral, from Earth-0 to Earth-51.

Even with a new Multiverse, not every published or related work had an "Earth" within the 52 and there were no in-continuity intercompany crossovers.

Taking advantage of the fact that many of these universes were mostly unchronicled or merely glimpsed and that Final Crisis also changed the Multiverse slightly, many stories featuring alternate worlds and their interactions were published, which led certain inconsistencies and retcons to appear, such as Earth-1 being originally a "mirror" of Earth-One and later being the reality of J. Michael Straczynski's Superman: Earth One or Earth-16 being the home of an alternate Superman/Christopher Kent, the home of the Super-Sons, and later the reality of the Young Justice TV series. Also, some universes appearing in the new continuity were never given a proper place within the 52 Universe, such as Prime-Earth.

==== The New 52 ====
The new restored universe with only 52 worlds opened myriad possibilities for new stories and crossovers with different versions of heroes interacting with the main versions of heroes as well as the stories resulting from the new integrated characters from Milestone and Wildstorm. However, it became chaotic in just five years. Many stories and situations of other Universes were not followed well. The number designations could be completely disregarded from story to story and some universes were recreated over and over. In addition, as most of the history of the Modern Age was still being the main continuity, younger readers could not follow the stories of the mainstream versions of the DC heroes, just as had happened prior to the original Crisis on Infinite Earths.

In order to overcome these new problems, a new event was created to restart the DC Comics' Universe. In the Flashpoint miniseries (May–September 2011), the Flash alters the timeline of Earth-0 creating a ripple effect that affected several past events, Earth-13 (Vertigo Universe) and Earth-50 (new Wildstorm Universe). Similar to the result of Crisis on Infinite Earths, a new mainstream Earth is created from the former three, with a whole new history. Most of the stories have been retold anew but certain events of New Earth remain (such as Batgirl being crippled by the Joker). Since it was established after Infinite Crisis that if something ever happened to the main Universe, the whole Multiverse could be affected as well, thus a new Multiverse of 52 worlds was also recreated. This new Multiverse is called The New 52.

This time, not all universes were revealed right away, only a couple were revealed in the first two years of The New 52. In addition, in a similar fashion as the Elseworlds logo would appear in comics that did not occur in the "real" continuity, the logo THE NEW 52! would only appear in publications with stories occurring in the new continuity, while those taking place outside of this new continuity (such as Smallville Season Eleven or the Batman Beyond universe) would not bear this distinction. At first it seemed that there was not going to be a naming convention for the Earths as it happened with the 52. The mainstream continuity was known as Prime Earth, although it was not a similar world to the real world as Earth-Prime was. J. Michael Straczynski's re-envisioning of Superman and Geoff Johns' reimagining of Batman were released as part of a series called Earth One. In Grant Morrison's The Multiversity (2014–2015), the Earths are named in the same format as in the former 52 Multiverse (Earth-6, Earth-7, Earth-8 etc.). Morrison intended for The Multiversity to reveal remaining universes of The New 52 multiverse, and the underlying structure for the multiverse was revealed in a detailed map in the back of several comic books, for which an interactive online version was maintained and updated on the DC Comics website. In addition, the sixth issue of The Multiversity constituted a 'guidebook' to the worlds of the current DC multiverse and was published in January 2015.

==== Convergence and DC Rebirth ====
In October 2011, Dan DiDio posted on his Facebook page that in The New 52, the three previous "crises" did not occur in this new continuity, but other events such as Zero Hour still happened, without ending in a crisis/reboot. However, writers continued to make references to the crises, and the full history of the structure of the DC Multiverse, detailing previous crisis events, was given in Grant Morrison's The Multiversity (2014–2015) limited series.

The Convergence (2015) crossover event later explored this concept within the DCU. This miniseries brought back several heroes from the ages of DC Comics that were obliterated by the crisis events. They were trapped by a godlike incarnation of Brainiac outside of time (or Vanishing Point as this "place" is called). At the end of the crossover, Brainiac sent these heroes back to their own timelines, and also successfully sent Zero Hour Hal Jordan, pre-Flashpoint Superman and other heroes back to the events of Crisis on Infinite Earths so that the collapse of the Multiverse could be averted.

From July 2015 onwards, The New 52 marking ended with the continuation of several publications and new others that did not necessarily take place within The New 52 multiverse. Advertised as DC YOU (a pun of DCU or DC Universe and the phrase "it's about you, the fans" appearing in the advertisements), DC now has an "open doors" policy to continuity, granting writers greater freedom to explore stories set outside the established New 52 Multiverse continuity, as well as to revisit other characters and concepts from DC's history as the conclusion of Convergence suggested that although the core 52 universe that now exists is the evolution of the multiverse, all the worlds still exist in some form. This was confirmed by Convergence writer Jeff King, who stated that the reconstituted Multiverse is infinite and there may be more than one Multiverse.

The 2016 DC Rebirth initiative returned the original Wally West to Earth from the Speed Force and reveals that time has been stolen from his friends' memories, and the Superman of the pre-Flashpoint world, stranded in the new timeline following Convergence, assumes the role of that Earth's Superman. In Action Comics #976, the pre-Flashpoint and New 52 Supermen's histories are merged. Peter Tomasi explained that "the events of Action #976 reset and reshape the entire Superman timeline. Where there had been two Superman, their realities have now been fused into one timeline with just one of them".

==== Dark Nights and Doomsday Clock ====
It is revealed in Death Metal that the New 52 was created by Perpetua, discovered by Doctor Manhattan in Doomsday Clock as he experimented with timelines, manipulating events to prevent many Golden Age heroes from gaining their powers and continually moving Superman to different points in the timeline, resulting in superheroes emerging later in history. After a confrontation with Superman, Manhattan attempts to erase his tampering and restore the Pre-Flashpoint and Pre-Crisis multiverses, as well as elements he had previously removed from the history of Earth-0 such as the Justice Society of America and Legion of Superheroes. It is later revealed that he failed, only managing to destabilise the timestream further as it attempted to accommodate events from previous versions of reality.

Meanwhile, Dark Nights: Metal, written by Scott Snyder, introduced the concept of the Dark Multiverse, a multiverse below the main DC Multiverse. A being named Barbatos launches an attack from the Dark Multiverse on reality, spearheaded by a force of villainous versions of Batman led by The Batman Who Laughs. The invasion is defeated, but the Source Wall is cracked and the Batman Who Laughs manages to escape into the main DC Universe. The story is continued in Justice League.

In Snyder's run on Justice League, the crack in the Source Wall allows the Totality, a small meteorite bearing immense power, to enter the Multiverse from the Source beyond. Lex Luthor retrieves the Totality and eventually frees Perpetua, the creator of the Multiverse. Despite the heroes' best efforts they are ultimately defeated. At the end of Justice League #39, the defeated League are saved from destruction by the Quintessence, who grant them the power necessary to fight Perpetua. The team run into a portal for the final battle, but this conflict is not shown and from there Justice League follows the team on other adventures, written by new writers. In the special event comic Year of the Villain: Hell Arisen, the Batman Who Laughs joins with Perpetua. The resolution to the Perpetua story arc was advertised in Justice League #39 as "The Encore", which would eventually be published as Dark Nights: Death Metal.

Published roughly contemporaneously, a six-issue miniseries titled Flash Forward follows Wally West being enlisted by a cosmic being known as Tempus Fuginaut to stop an incursion of the Dark Multiverse. At the end of the series, Wally sits in the Mobius Chair, gaining omniscience and residual power from Dr. Manhattan. In an epilogue published in The Flash #750, Wally surveys the timestream and notices multiple contradictions and inconsistencies within history, the result of Manhattan's tampering with time.

This was originally intended to lead into the Generations miniseries and a reboot of the Multiverse termed "5G", which would have fixed all of DC's publishing history into a single coherent continuity, stretching from World War II to the present day, with stories going forward focussing on new characters or aged versions of current ones. "A Brave New World", intended to be the first story set in this continuity, was published in Wonder Woman #750. This reboot was cancelled due to delays caused by the COVID-19 pandemic and the firing of publisher Dan DiDio, who was the main architect of 5G. The original plans for 5G were recycled into the Future State event, which followed Dark Nights: Death Metal.

Dark Nights: Death Metal and its companion comics act as a conclusion to Dark Nights: Metal, Flash Forward and Scott Snyder's run on Justice League. Perpetua destroys much of the Multiverse while the Batman Who Laughs reshapes Earth-0 according to his whims, creating the Metalverse. The Batman Who Laughs successfully steals Wally's new power, becoming a godlike being known as the Darkest Knight. He kills Perpetua and creates his own Multiverse of twisted worlds called "The Last 52". Wonder Woman gains the power necessary to fight him and eventually destroys him in the Death Sun at the end of time.

The Multiverse is once again recreated by higher beings from the Source, with Wonder Woman ascending alongside them to protect it. The New 52/Rebirth multiverse is restored largely as it was prior to the events of Dark Nights: Death Metal. As well as this, a new infinite web of multiverses appears, the Multiverse developing into an Omniverse. It is established that all events in DC's publishing history have occurred within this new Omniverse, with characters gaining the memories of all their prior incarnations.

==== Dark Crisis and Flashpoint Beyond ====
Infinite Frontier reveals that awareness of prior incarnations is widespread but not ubiquitous. It also identifies Multiverse 2 as the "corpse" of the pre-Crisis Multiverse. Dark Crisis calls the Omniverse into question, and adds infinite Earths taken from Multiverse 2 into the Orrery of Worlds, expanding it to contain infinite Earths.

Concurrently with Dark Crisis, Flashpoint Beyond reveals that the Omniverse and Hypertime exist alongside each other as parts of a larger Divine Continuum, with the Omniverse corresponding to Space and Hypertime corresponding to Time. It also organizes previous Crisis events into Omniversal Crises and Hypertime Crises, with the "Crisis on Infinite Earths", "Infinite Crisis", "Final Crisis", "Multiversity", "Dark Nights", and "Dark Crisis" being Omniversal Crises and "Zero Hour", "the Kingdom", "Flashpoint/New 52", "Convergence", "DC Rebirth/Doomsday Clock", and "Flashpoint Beyond" and "The New Golden Age" being Hypertime Crises.

== Fictional history and structure ==
=== Original Multiverse ===
The Multiverse was originally created by Perpetua, a member of a race of cosmic beings known as "Hands", referencing the common imagery in DC of a giant hand creating the universe. She also created the Monitor, Anti-Monitor and World Forger. The original Multiverse consisted of an infinite positive matter multiverse to be overseen by the Monitor; a dark matter Multiverse where the World Forger would create new universes to be either added to the positive matter multiverse or destroyed; and an antimatter multiverse ruled over by the Anti-Monitor to shield the Multiverse from danger in the wider Omniverse. Perpetua was supposed to move on to create new Multiverses, leaving her creation in the hands of her children, but instead she remained, creating ever more aggressive forms of life to forge the Multiverse into a weapon to be used against her own kind. Her sons contacted the higher beings within the Source who contained the aberrant Multiverse within the Source Wall, imprisoned Perpetua within the Wall and remade the original positive matter multiverse into a single positive matter Universe, which Krona, the rogue Maltusian, would eventually splinter into another infinite Multiverse. The beings within the Source decided to give the Multiverse a chance to achieve perfection, a "Justice Configuration", isolated from the wider Omniverse. Eventually, it would be judged, and if found to still be tainted with the violence of its beginning, it would be destroyed.

=== Infinite Multiverse ===
As told in Crisis on Infinite Earths #7, the DC Universe was a single positive matter Universe until a scientist named Krona from the planet Oa altered the very moment of the creation of the Universe, causing it to split into countless similar universes and an antimatter universe. Oa, however, had no duplicates in the Multiverse but did have a twin in the antimatter universe: Qward. A satellite on each of these planets was created in the cataclysm and it was there where the embodiments of the Multiverse were born: the Monitor and the Anti-Monitor. The two battled to a standstill and eventually rendered one another comatose.

The Multiverse had countless duplicates of planet Earth. Every Earth had a different history from one another but they always developed heroes and inspired heroic ages (which, according to Harbinger, it somehow made them a focal point among all the worlds in every universe). Some of the heroes of Earth knew about other Earths and their own counterparts and fought side by side on many occasions.

Later, a scientist from one universe named Kell Mossa (known initially only as Pariah) created another device that would allow him to attempt the same thing Krona had attempted before. His actions accidentally awakened the Anti-Monitor, who then devoured Pariah's entire universe (aside from Pariah himself) and began to do the same to other universes. The time period of Earth when this takes place or the name of this Earth are never revealed.

The Monitor is awakened by the destruction of the positive matter universes and starts a plan to save the Multiverse but his efforts, and later those of his protégé, Harbinger, with the help of the heroes of the Multiverse, only manage to save five universes. In a desperate effort to save all existence, heroes and villains unite in order to stop Krona from splitting the Universe and stop the Anti-Monitor from altering the moment of creation and make the Antimatter Universe the only one. They succeed in saving all existence but in the process, the Multiverse, its countless duplicate worlds and its history ceased to exist. The five universes that were saved were folded together into a single universe, placing all the heroes and villains into a single timeline. For example, the Justice Society of Earth-Two instead became a team active in the 1940s that inspired the Justice League to form decades later. In the event of any duplicate characters, the original Earth-One version would take precedence.

All the universes existed within the same space, but had a unique vibration that kept them separated. Only by "tuning" to the specific frequency of a universe could a person leap to another Earth, as Barry Allen discovered as he tried to perform a disappearing act by vibrating his molecules at super-speed (Flash #123). Barry later developed a machine called the "Cosmic Treadmill", which, when it was used by people who controlled the Speed Force, it allowed the users to trespass the "vibrational barriers". Magic and cosmic incidents also made many people to travel to other universes.

Every universe could have its own dimensions, such as the Fifth Dimension (where Mister Mxyzptlk and Bat-Mite originate from), alternate timelines (Kamandi and the 30th century of Earth-One) and realms (Hell, Heaven, Gemworld, etc.). In addition to the unique Antimatter Universe, the dimension of the New Gods (the Fourth World) was also believed unique, although there is evidence that there could have been alternate versions of them (as those appearing in Earth-17 and Earth-Crossover).

Even though the interaction between multiple Earths was common in the 20th century with relative safety and ease, most of the population of Earth was unaware of the Multiverse until the Crisis on Infinite Earths.

=== DC Universe and Megaverse ===
15 billion years ago, a single universe with a single timestream was created. 4.4 billion years ago, Krona, the renegade Maltusian (a race of highly evolved beings) creates the Antimatter Universe and releases entropy in the universe by linking the beginning and the end of the timeline in his attempts to reveal the secrets of the creation of the universe.

In this single universe, the timeline was destroyed in the early 1990s by Hal Jordan (possessed by Parallax) and created a slightly changed timeline (Zero Hour, 1994). It was later revealed that this Central Timeline was like a river with branches. These branches were like different realities, the history of Earth was different in every branch and everything could be possible in them. They could affect the Central Timeline as they return to the mainstream and the heroes could encounter with different versions of themselves. However, they were somewhat ephemeral as the Central Timeline is the only one that could prevail (The Kingdom, 1999).

After Crisis on Infinite Earths, there was no place for alternate realities, although they could exist in the form of ephemeral timelines (Hypertime), dimensions (such as the fifth dimension or the Fourth World) or universes inside the Universe (such as the Legion of Super-Heroes' pocket universe or the Amalgam Universe).

There was contact with realities that existed outside the Universe such as those from Marvel, Milestone and Wildstorm. The collection of universes, multiverses and others that are unrelated, is most of the time called the Megaverse. Some also call it the Omniverse, but tend to include the Real World when using this denomination.

The contact of these worlds usually brought cataclysms, the one being the most common, amalgamation. Traveling between these realities was extremely hard, only two characters were capable of doing so with natural abilities: Rift, who existed in both the DC and Milestone Universes, and Access, who had the task of keeping the DC and Marvel Universes separated to prevent amalgamation.

Most of the time, these events were either forgotten (as shown in the Unlimited Access miniseries as Access has the power to annul or restore the memories of heroes) or believed to be "dreams" (as shown in DC/Milestone: Worlds Collide and DC/Wildstorm: Dreamwar), which in the end left few traces of the events in the respective continuities.

The Wildstorm Universe was part of a larger multiverse but was separated after a multiversal cataclysm, forming a multiverse of its own ("Shattered Image"). Organizations known as Planetary and the Authority were capable of traveling across the Multiverse and were also able to map it. Its structure was described as a web of 196,833 universes arranged in a pattern resembling a snowflake, each universe separated from its neighbors by a medium called the Bleed. The Bleed prevented the Universes from colliding and was inhabited by "fauna" that despised all different Earths.

=== 52 ===
Alexander Luthor Jr. of Earth-Three and Superboy of Earth-Prime grew tired of their exile. After successfully escaping their prison, they seek to restore their worlds and search for a perfect new world, as they believe the happenings at New Earth after the Crisis make it a flawed reality. The whole Multiverse is restored, but with great instability that could cause the end of all existence (Infinite Crisis). Parallel to these events, Captain Atom arrives in a different multiverse, jeopardizing its very existence. Void destroys the now-corrupted universe in order to recreate it (Captain Atom: Armageddon).

The heroes of Earth manage to merge back the Multiverse into a single universe, but it could not hold so much energy. 52 identical worlds are created to liberate such energy. Mister Mind metamorphoses into a form dubbed "Hyperfly", who devours parts of the time continuum and recreates the multiverse.

In the Dakotaverse, a man known as Dharma foresaw the final demise of Earth and searched for a way to avert it. His very efforts were responsible for the apocalypse he tried to prevent. He managed to salvage the remains of his Earth by merging them to the main Earth of the new Multiverse that was reformed after the death of the New Gods.

This Multiverse consisted of only 52 worlds, 51 resting upon Earth-0. According to Rip Hunter in 52 #52, every universe occupied the same space, each on a different vibrational plane (as it was in the original Multiverse). However, it was stated later that the universes were also separated by a fluid known as the Bleed (just like in the former Wildstorm Universe). The Bleed is interconnected to the Source Wall (which separates existence from the force that created it or "the Source") and the Multiversal Nexus, where the 52 Monitors watched over the Multiverse and had the task of avoiding contacts between the universes that could cause cataclysms. If Earth-0 should be destroyed, it would cause a chain reaction, destroying the rest of the 51 universes and leaving the opposite Antimatter Universe solely in existence. Each of the alternate universes have their own countless parallel/higher dimensions, divergent timelines, microverses, etc., branching off them. The Monitors originated in a world called Nil and were a sort of descendants of the original Monitor, who was created by Overvoid, a limitless intelligence who investigated the Multiverse at the beginning of time. Nix Uotan, the Monitor of Earth-51, erased the Monitors, as they self-proclaimed themselves the judges of what happened in the worlds of the Multiverse.

=== The New 52 ===
The Flash wakes up in an altered timeline. As he tries to find the cause, he discovers that he was responsible for the alteration and attempts to fix it. In doing so, it is revealed that the timelines of Earth-0, Earth-13 and Earth-50 were originally one, but were splintered. The result is a new timeline formed by those three and along with it came a new history for the other 52 worlds within the Multiverse (Flashpoint (2011)). It is later revealed that, in actuality, the current timeline was created when a mysterious being (implied to be Doctor Manhattan from Watchmen) entered the Multiverse while the timeline was resetting due to Barry Allen preventing the Flashpoint event and extracted 10 years from continuity (DC Universe: Rebirth (2016)).

Years later, the Harbinger Program at the House of Heroes gathers several superheroes of the "Orrery of Worlds" to fight against a force known as the "Gentry" who has already decimated Earth-7 and threatens the rest of the worlds of the Multiverse. As the story unfolds, Earths within the Orrery are visited and reveal the new nature of them after the Flashpoint event. Also, mysterious comic books published by DC and Major Comics appear and are believed to be cursed or to be messages from parallel Earths (The Multiversity (2014)).

Several stories and even the structure of the entire Multiverse have been retold after the events of Flashpoint. As it has been revealed so far, most of the 52 worlds suffered drastic changes, such as Earth-2 which is now a reboot in the present day of the heroes that formed the Justice Society or Earth-3 which reverted to be the opposite of the main Earth (Earth-0 in this case), instead of the opposite of Earth-Two. Others retain most of what they were in the 52 Multiverse such as Earth-5, 10, or 23. In addition, seven Earths remain undisclosed in composition or purpose, other than their creation by the Monitors for unknown reasons – Earths 14, 24, 25, 27, 28, 46 and 49.

The Monitors are now described as a race of countless members and only 52 remained after the Crisis on Infinite Earths event, suggesting that there were Monitors for every world in the original Multiverse instead of just one. Several elements that have appeared across the history to what now is DC Comics have also been actively incorporated in the new structure, such as the Source Wall (The New Gods), the Bleed (Wildstorm's The Authority), the Speed Force and the vibrational barriers (The Flash) and the Rock of Eternity (Shazam!).

This new Multiverse has a sphere-like structure with several levels (or vibrational realms) as described in the map:

- The Source Wall: the limit of existence, beyond lies the Source and the Unknowable. The Overvoid is shown in the map to exist outside it as well.
- The Monitor Sphere: the origin of the Monitors, a race who preserves and studies the universes.
- Limbo: "where matter and memory break down"; the place where the lost and forgotten go.
- The Sphere of the Gods: within it, the realms of old and new gods, demons and even dreams exist.
- The Speed Force Wall: also known as the Speed of Light and is the limit to matter. Within it is the Orrery of Worlds and certain worlds exist in it (such as KRAKKL the Defender's world).
- The Orrery of Worlds: the realm where the 52 universes exist in the same space, vibrating at different frequencies, within the Bleed. In the center of it are the Rock of Eternity and the House of Heroes.

=== Multi-Multiverse ===
An infinitely powerful and god-like version of Brainiac abducted multiple superheroes and their core cities from various alternate Earths and eras of the Multiverse and pitted them against one another. Because of the heroes' efforts for the survival of reality during this event, the events of Crisis on Infinite Earths and Zero Hour were averted and there is once more an infinite Multiverse beyond the core 52 universes which have made up the local Multiverse since Infinite Crisis and Flashpoint. The original Multiverse coexists along with the collapsed Earth, the core 52 worlds, and all other versions of the Multiverse that have ever existed.

=== Dark Multiverse ===
In the Dark Nights: Metal storyline, it is revealed that the matter and antimatter universes of the Multiverse are vastly outnumbered by a Dark Multiverse composed of dark matter. Formed by the dreams and fears of the inhabitants of the upper Multiverse, the Dark Universes are ephemeral, motivating the Dark Knights to invade the Multiverse in order to save their dying realities. The "Dark Multiverse" stories revisit this realm, with mutated versions of Superman, Jimmy Olsen, and Lois Lane.

=== Metaverse ===
Doomsday Clock proposes a new theory about the DC Universe featured as a "metaverse" acting in constant change with Superman as its center, which could explain the many continuity reboots in DC's mainline comic books. This theory referred to what Grant Morrison had previously proposed about the DC Universe having its own consciousness.

=== Omniverse ===
Upon the conclusion of Dark Nights: Death Metal, the Multiverse is recreated by the Hands as an Omniverse. The timeline of the DCU is "unknotted", meaning that every version of history throughout the existence of the Multiverse is considered to have occurred in the past of the Omniverse and is remembered by the inhabitants of Earth-0. A team of superheroes and villains called "the Totality" is formed to protect the DCU from threats in this new, greater Multiverse.

In addition to the New 52 Multiverse, the Omniverse consists of an infinite number of alternate multiverses. Earth-0 is no longer the centre of the Multiverse, which now has two opposite centres of power, termed "the Elseworld" and "Earth Omega".

=== Planetary ===
The WildStorm comic book series Planetary also introduced the concept of a multiverse, drawing upon the mathematical concept known as the Monster group for inspiration. The multiverse is described as "a theoretical snowflake existing in 196,833 dimensional space", a reference to the visualization method used by some mathematicians when describing the Monster group.

== Other media ==
=== Super Friends ===
In the animated television series Super Friends, the superhero team has encounters with other universes, including the world of Qward. In the episode "Universe of Evil", a freak accident causes Superman to switch places with his evil counterpart in another universe.

=== DC Animated Universe ===
The DC Animated Universe (DCAU) has depicted the Multiverse many times. Several characters from the main DCAU have visited parallel universes that were similar to the DCAU:

- In the Superman: The Animated Series episode "Brave New Metropolis", Lois Lane is transported to a parallel Earth whose version of Lois died in a car bombing orchestrated by Intergang. As a result, Superman had nothing to keep his morality from becoming corrupted. Superman teamed with Lex Luthor and took over Metropolis, turning it into a fascist police-state. Superman turns against Luthor after Lois shows him what he is planning.
- In the Justice League episode "Legends", several members of the League are accidentally sent to a parallel universe and encounter the Justice Guild of America, a pastiche of the Justice Society of America. Justice Guild member Tom Turbine hypothesized that there are an infinite number of parallel dimensions.
- In the Justice League episode "A Better World", the Justice League encounter the Justice Lords, their authoritarian counterparts from another universe. In this universe, Lex Luthor became president and had started a war which had killed the Flash, sparking the Lords' takeover of the world, starting with this Superman killing Luthor. In this world, the Justice Lords lobotomized their former enemies, leaving them as harmless workers at Arkham Asylum.

=== Lois & Clark: The New Adventures of Superman ===
In Lois & Clark: The New Adventures of Superman, the show's primary protagonists, Lois Lane and Clark Kent, encountered an alternative version Clark Kent from a parallel universe in the episodes "Tempus, Anyone?" and "Lois & Clarks".

The primary version of Lois, who was abducted by the villain Tempus and taken to this dimension, helped the alternate Clark become Superman, only to have Tempus expose his secret identity to the world on television. Despite Clark's alien origin, the world embraces him as their champion.

Later in the episode "Lois & Clarks", the alternate Clark visits the primary L&C dimension to aid Lois in stopping Tempus while the Clark Kent of her world is trapped in a time vortex. After Tempus' defeat, it is implied that the alternate Clark would travel to the past with H.G. Wells and take his reality's Lois Lane to his own time thus, under a causal loop of time travels, explaining her disappearance.

=== Smallville ===
The live-action television series Smallville also featured the Multiverse concept. In the season 5 episode "Lexmas", Lex Luthor visits an alternate timeline where Lionel Luthor cuts Lex out of the family fortune while Lex is married to Lana Lang and has a son named Alexander. Clark Kent is a reporter with the Daily Planet, Chloe Sullivan is publishing a book exposing LuthorCorp with Lex's help, and Jonathan Kent is a state senator.

In the season 7 episode "Apocalypse", Clark is taken to an alternate timeline where his counterpart never arrived in Smallville and was killed by Brainiac. In that dimension, Clark Kent encounters another version of himself who is the human son of Martha and Jonathan and never met Lana Lang. Also in this dimension, Chloe Sullivan is engaged, Lana Lang is a married woman living in Paris, Sheriff Nancy Adams left Smallville and works for the government, and Lex Luthor is President of the United States. Luthor destroys this dimension's Earth, but Clark travels back in time and sends his infant self to Earth, thus restoring his timeline.

The season 10 episodes "Luthor" and "Kent" feature an alternate universe where Clark was adopted by Lionel Luthor instead of the Kents and became a tyrant known as Ultraman.

=== Batman: The Brave and the Bold ===
In Batman: The Brave and the Bold, a kind of "multiverse" is referenced in the episodes "Deep Cover for Batman!" and "Game Over for Owlman!", which feature several references to alternate incarnations of DC Comics heroes and villains, including Batman and Owlman. The Multiverse is briefly revisited in "Night of the Batmen!", with a large group of Batmen gathered from across various Earths coming together to help an injured Bruce Wayne protect Gotham. The army of Multiverse Batmen contained various iterations of the Batman from different media adaptions, such as from The Batman, the DC Animated Universe, the 1960s Batman TV series, and Batman Beyond.

=== Justice League: Crisis on Two Earths ===
The direct-to-video feature film Justice League: Crisis on Two Earths deals with the Multiverse as part of its story. The main story deals with a good Lex Luthor from his Earth (based on the Pre-Crisis Earth-Three) coming to the Earth where the Justice League are located to help fight their counterparts, the Crime Syndicate. Earth-Prime is featured in the film, but is not the same Earth-Prime from the comics, where it was "our" Earth. In the film, Earth-Prime is shown to be the cornerstone of all reality, and that decisions made by humankind on this world caused alternate Earths where the opposite decision was made to come into being.

=== DC Universe Online ===
In the video game DC Universe Online, Brainiac decides to conquer New Earth in order to know the secret of the multiverse. After he was defeated, the heroes have to face the Council of Luthors, who wants to take control of the Nexus of Reality and rule existence through the achievement of ultimate power. The Council of Batmen wishes to stop the Luthors and undo the damage that has been done.

=== Green Lantern: The Animated Series ===
In the second half of Green Lantern: The Animated Series, Hal Jordan and his allies face off against the Anti-Monitor and his army of Manhunters. After Jordan is attacked by the Anti-Monitor, he is transported to on an alternate world where steam is the world's main powersource and meets up with Gil Broome, the eponymous Steam Lantern. Broome and his allies eventually manage to get Jordan back home to his own world, where he reunites with his comrades.

=== Injustice ===
The storyline of Injustice: Gods Among Us features an alternate reality where the Joker tricks Superman into killing Lois Lane and their unborn son and destroying Metropolis in a nuclear explosion. This tragedy ruins Superman's moral compass to the point of no return, leading him to establish a new world order with himself as the High Councilor.

=== Infinite Crisis (video game) ===
The video game Infinite Crisis (which is unrelated to the comic book miniseries of the same name) features a Multiverse with 52 different worlds. This Multiverse is threatened by a sudden assault and all realities stand on the brink of annihilation. The last hope for Earth lies in the powers of the DC Legends.

In the tie-in comic Infinite Crisis: Fight for the Multiverse, it is revealed that the Monitors were a race of beings native to the world of Nil that resided outside all realities in the Overvoid. Their existence came following the creation of the Multiverse and the Bleed where they watched the infinite Earths and sought to protect the infinite strands of creation. It was claimed that they were a people that cared little about the existence of the inhabitants of these universes and more for the preservation of their grand order. Such was their existence, until one of their kind turned against the others and became the Anti-Monitor. A Crisis emerged as a result whereby many universes were destroyed, but the Anti-Monitor was defeated at the cost of almost the entire Monitor race. From this Crisis, there existed only 52 universes left in the Multiverse that were kept in perfect balance.

=== Arrowverse and other series ===
In 2014, DC CCO Geoff Johns said that the universe present in the publisher's television series, Arrow and The Flash, is separate from the one being built in their films with Man of Steel and Batman v Superman: Dawn of Justice. Johns explained DC's difference in approach to Marvel: "We look at it as the multiverse. We have our TV universe and our film universe, but they all co-exist. For us, creatively, it's about allowing everyone to make the best possible product, to tell the best story, to do the best world. Everyone has a vision and you really want to let the visions shine through... It's just a different approach".

The Multiverse concept is explored during the second season of The Flash, which is pivotal to the conflicts between Barry Allen (Grant Gustin) and rogue speedster Hunter Zolomon (Teddy Sears). The access points to the Multiverse are portals that were created as a result of an exploding singularity over Central City during the season two premiere "The Man Who Saved Central City". In the episode "Enter Zoom", it is revealed that Earth-2's version of the Green Arrow is Robert Queen (Jamey Sheridan) instead of his son Oliver (Stephen Amell), who presumably died on the boat accident. Arrow's season eight episode "Starling City" reveals that Earth-2's Starling City has another green-hood archer, The Hood, who is a heroic doppelgänger of Adrian Chase, and its Dark Archer is not Malcolm Merlyn but his son Tommy. In the season two finale "The Race of His Life", Zoom reveals that the universe in which that of Arrow, The Flash and Legends of Tomorrow sets is positioned in the Multiverse's center, and from there one could travel to any of the other infinite numbers of Earths. After Jay Garrick is rescued from Zoom, he reveals that he is from yet another Earth, designated Earth-3. In the season three episode "The New Rogues", the Flash team explore the multiverse in search of a Harrison Wells doppelganger to replace the Earth-2 version. They encounter four others from various Earths, two of which are named Earth-17 and 19, from which their new recruit, Harrison "H.R." Wells, originates.

The television series Supergirl exists as another alternate universe separate from the main Arrowverse continuity. This is confirmed in the Supergirl episode "Worlds Finest", when the Flash appears on Supergirl's universe. Supergirl's universe is coined Earth-38 by Cisco Ramon.

The 2017 crossover event "Crisis on Earth-X" – which sees the heroes from all four shows face an invasion from the titular 'Earth-X', as a world where the Nazis won World War II – establishes that there are 52 known alternate Earths, with the titular 'Earth-X' being the fifty-third Earth, described by Harrison "Harry" Wells of Earth-2, that those who are aware of the multiverse as being so dark and horrific that no interdimensional traveler would dare to journey there. Its history is akin to Earth-1, 2, and 38, except the outcomes of World War II and Adolf Hitler continued his reign worldwide until his death in 1994. Its inhabitants include counterparts of people from these Earths as well, including Oliver Queen's doppelgänger, who is Hitler's successor as Führer and the villainous archer the Dark Arrow.

The 2019 crossover event "Crisis on Infinite Earths", inspired by the comic of the same name incorporated a number of television shows and films as part of a larger multiverse within Arrowverse; the shows include Batman, The Flash, Smallville, Birds of Prey, Lucifer etc., while the films include Batman and its sequel Batman Returns, Superman Returns and Green Lantern. Most of the universes were destroyed, while others were merged, restored or newly created after the event. Additionally, one of the Arrowverse protagonists, Barry Allen / The Flash, has a brief interaction with another version of Flash (portrayed by Ezra Miller) from the DC Extended Universe film series during the event.

=== Teen Titans ===
Issue #48 introduces its own multiverse. Each world pays references to various incarnations of the Teen Titans.

The worlds shown are:

- The majority of the story is set on a world which is menaced by the Teen Tyrants (evil Teen Titans), and is defended by the Brotherhood of Justice (heroic versions of the Brotherhood of Evil). It is similar to Earth-3.
- Malchior's (from the Teen Titans episode "Spellbound") homeworld.
- A world similar to the past from the Teen Titans episode "Cyborg the Barbarian".
- A world containing the teen Lobo.
- A world consisting of the animalistic Teen Titans (from the Teen Titans episode "Bunny Raven").
- Another future timeline with Nightwing (from the Teen Titans episode "How Long Is Forever").
- A world consisting of the Chibi Titans.
- A world in which the Teen Titans (as depicted in the Silver Age comics) consist of Robin, Speedy, Wonder Girl, Aqualad, and Kid Flash.
- The home of Larry the Titan.
- A futuristic world that is home to the Teen Titans, consisting of Nightwing, Battalion, Mirage, and Killowat.

== Parodies ==
- Bongo Comics published a comic book series featuring characters from The Simpsons and Futurama titled Futurama/Simpsons Infinitely Secret Crossover Crisis, in which the Simpsons were presented as fictional characters in the Futurama universe. One of the conventions of DC's Multiverse is the existence of one universe's characters as fictional characters in another.
- IDW's Super Secret Crisis War! parodies DC's Crisis on Infinite Earths and Marvel's Secret Wars in their logo, a major crossover event featuring several character universes from their Cartoon Network–based publications.

== See also ==
- List of DC Multiverse worlds
- DC Universe
- Multiverse (Marvel Comics)
- Multiverse (Marvel Cinematic Universe)
