= Nightrider (DC Comics) =

- Nightrider as depicted in Team Titans #6 (March 1993). Art by Art Nichols .

Publication information
- Publisher: DC Comics
- First appearance: The New Titans #79 (September 1991)
- Created by: Marv Wolfman

In-story information
- Full name: David
- Team affiliations: Teen Titans
- Notable aliases: Dagon
- Abilities: Vampiric physiology

Nightrider (Dagon) is a fictional vampire superhero from the DC Comics universe. He is a member of the Team Titans, a rebel group seeking to overthrow Lord Chaos, the dictator of an alternate Earth ten years into the future.

== Fictional character biography ==
David is originally an ordinary human growing up in London. When he is ten, David was hit by a truck. Lord Chaos takes a special interest in him, making him a test subject.

At the age of fourteen, David is the subject of an experiment in which he is infused with DNA drawn from the bones of Dracula. This transforms David into a vampire, with him assuming the name Dagon and dubbing his human self dead.

Nightrider, Killowat, Terra, Mirage, and Battalion travel back in time to kill Donna Troy before she can give birth to Lord Chaos. The team ultimately resolves the conflict by having Troy give up her powers, meaning that Chaos will be born but have no powers. This leaves the Titans trapped in the present with no way to return to their timeline, which no longer exists.

During the Zero Hour: Crisis in Time! event, the Team Titans are revealed to have been created by Monarch and the Time Trapper to serve their goals. When the timeline collapses, the Titans are erased from existence.

== Other versions ==
- Dagon appears in Teen Titans Go! #48.
- Dagon appears in DC vs. Vampires: All-Out War #3.
