= Robin (character) =

DC Comics superhero

- Various incarnations of the character Robin, art by Yasmine Putri (Clockwise from top left: Dick Grayson, Tim Drake, Jason Todd, Carrie Kelley, Damian Wayne, and Stephanie Brown)
- Publisher: DC Comics
- First appearance: Detective Comics #38 (April 1940)
- Created by: Bill Finger; Bob Kane; Jerry Robinson
- Characters: List: Dick Grayson Jason Todd Tim Drake Stephanie Brown Damian Wayne Clone of Bruce Wayne

Robin
- : Cover of Robin (vol. 2) #1 (November 1993) featuring the Tim Drake version of the character, art by Tom Grummett and Scott Hanna

Series publication information
- Publisher: DC Comics
- Schedule: List: (vol. 1, Robin II: The Joker's Wild!, vols. 2–3): Monthly (Robin III: Cry of the Huntress): Bi-weekly
- Format: List: (vol. 1, Robin II: The Joker's Wild!, Robin III: Cry of the Huntress): Limited series (vols. 2–3) Ongoing series
- Genre: Superhero
- Publication date: List: (vol. 1) January 1991 – May 1991 (Robin II: The Joker's Wild!) October 1991 – December 1991 (Robin III: Cry of the Huntress) December 1992 – March 1993 (vol. 4) November 1993 – April 2009 (vol. 5) April 2021 – August 2022
- Number of issues: List: (vol. 1): 5 (Robin II: The Joker's Wild!): 4 (Robin III: Cry of the Huntress): 6 (vol. 4): 185 (including issues #0 and 1,000,000), plus 7 Annuals (vol. 5): 17
- Main character(s): List: (vol. 1, Robin II: The Joker's Wild!) Tim Drake (Robin III: Cry of the Huntress) Tim Drake, the Huntress (Helena Bertinelli) (vol. 4) Tim Drake, Stephanie Brown (vol. 5) Damian Wayne

Creative team
- Writer(s): List: (vol. 1, Robin II: The Joker's Wild!, Robin III: Cry of the Huntress, vol. 4) Chuck Dixon (vol. 4) Chuck Dixon Jon Lewis Bill Willingham Adam Beechen Fabian Nicieza (vol. 5) Joshua Williamson
- Penciller(s): List: (vol. 1, Robin II: The Joker's Wild!, Robin III: Cry of the Huntress) Tom Lyle (vol. 4) Tom Grummett Phil Jimenez Mike Wieringo Staz Johnson Pete Woods Damion Scott Scott McDaniel Freddie Williams II (vol. 5) Gleb Melnikov
- Inker(s): List: (vol. 1, Robin II: The Joker's Wild!, Robin III: Cry of the Huntress) Bob Smith (vol. 4) Scott Hanna Stan Woch Bob Smith
- Colorist(s): List: (vol. 1, Robin II: The Joker's Wild!, Robin III: Cry of the Huntress) Adrienne Roy (vol. 4) Adrienne Roy Guy Major

Robin is the alias of several superheroes appearing in American comic books published by DC Comics. The character was created by Bob Kane, Bill Finger, and Jerry Robinson to serve as a junior counterpart and the sidekick to the superhero Batman. As a team, Batman and Robin have commonly been referred to as the Caped Crusaders and the Dynamic Duo. The character's first incarnation, Dick Grayson, debuted in Detective Comics #38 (April 1940). Conceived as a way to attract young readership, Robin garnered overwhelmingly positive critical reception, doubling the sales of the Batman titles. Robin's early adventures included Star Spangled Comics #65–130 (1947–1952), the character's first solo feature. He made regular appearances in Batman-related comic books and other DC Comics publications from 1940 through the early 1980s, until the character set aside the Robin identity and became the independent superhero Nightwing.

The character's second incarnation, Jason Todd, first appeared in Batman #357 (1983). He made regular appearances in Batman-related comic books until 1988, when he was murdered by the Joker in the storyline "A Death in the Family". Jason was resurrected following a reality-changing incident, eventually becoming the Red Hood. The premiere Robin limited series was published in 1991, featuring the character's third incarnation, Tim Drake, training to earn the role of Batman's vigilante partner. After two successful sequels, the monthly Robin series began in 1993 and ended in early 2009, which also helped his transition from sidekick to a superhero in his own right. In 2004 storylines, established DC Comics character Stephanie Brown became the fourth Robin for a short time before the role reverted to Tim Drake. Damian Wayne succeeds Drake as Robin in the 2009 story arc "Battle for the Cowl."

The current and former Robins always feature prominently in Batman's cast of supporting heroes; Dick, Jason, Tim, and Damian all regard him as a father. In current continuity as of 2025, Dick Grayson serves as Nightwing, Jason Todd is the Red Hood, Stephanie Brown is Batgirl, while Tim Drake and Damian both share the title of Robin. In recent years, Batman has also adopted new sidekicks in the form of Bluebird, whose name references Robin, and The Signal.

== Creation ==
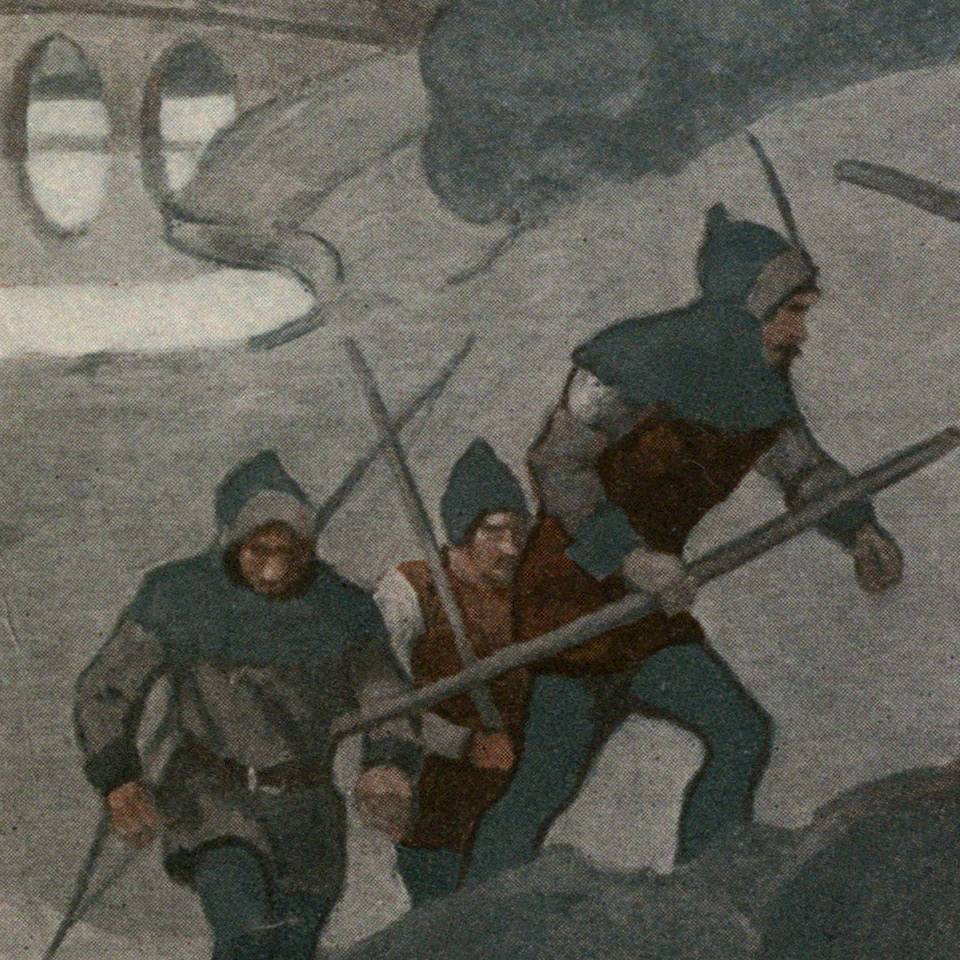
Characters from an illustration by N. C. Wyeth for "Robin Hood" (1917) by Paul Creswick. The look inspired Jerry Robinson's design for Robin.

About a year after Batman's debut, Batman creators Bob Kane and Bill Finger introduced Robin the Boy Wonder in Detective Comics #38 (1940). The name "Robin the Boy Wonder" and the medieval look of the original costume were inspired by Robin Hood. Jerry Robinson noted he "came up with Robin because the adventures of Robin Hood were boyhood favorites of mine. I had been given a Robin Hood book illustrated by N. C. Wyeth ... and that's what I quickly sketched out when I suggested the name Robin Hood, which they seemed to like, and then showed them the costume. And if you look at it, it's Wyeth's costume, from my memory, because I didn't have the book to look at." Although Robin is best known as Batman's sidekick, the Robins have also been members of the superhero groups the Teen Titans (with the original Robin, Dick Grayson, as a founding member and the latter group's leader) and Young Justice.

In Batman stories, the character of Robin was intended to be Batman's Watson: Bill Finger, writer for many early Batman adventures, said:

"Robin was an outgrowth of a conversation I had with Bob. As I said, Batman was a combination of Douglas Fairbanks and Sherlock Holmes. Holmes had his Watson. The thing that bothered me was that Batman didn't have anyone to talk to, and it got a little tiresome always having him thinking. I found that as I went along Batman needed a Watson to talk to. That's how Robin came to be. Bob called me over and said he was going to put a boy in the strip to identify with Batman. I thought it was a great idea."

== Fictional character biography ==
The following fictional characters have assumed the Robin role at various times in the main DC Comics Universe continuity:

=== Dick Grayson ===
Dick Grayson as Robin on the cover of Detective Comics #48 (February 1941), art by Bob Kane

In the comics, Dick Grayson was an 8-year-old acrobat and the youngest of a family act called the "Flying Graysons". A gangster named Boss Zucco, loosely based on actor Edward G. Robinson's Little Caesar character, had been extorting money from the circus and killed Grayson's parents, John and Mary, by sabotaging their trapeze equipment as a warning against defiance. Batman investigated the crime and, as his alter ego billionaire Bruce Wayne, had Dick put under his custody as a legal ward. Together they investigated Zucco and collected the evidence needed to bring him to justice. From his debut appearance in 1940 through 1969, Robin was known as the Boy Wonder. Batman creates a costume for Dick, consisting of a red tunic, yellow cape, green gloves, green boots, green spandex briefs, and a utility belt. As he grew older, graduated from high school, and enrolled in Hudson University, Robin continued his career as the Teen Wonder, from 1970 into the early 1980s.

The character was rediscovered by a new generation of fans during the 1980s because of the success of The New Teen Titans, in which he left Batman's shadow entirely to assume the identity of Nightwing. He aids Batman throughout the later storyline regarding the several conflicts with Jason Todd until he makes his final return as the "Red Hood". Grayson temporarily took over as Batman (while Wayne was traveling through time), using the aid of Damian Wayne, making his newish appearance as "Robin", to defeat and imprison Todd. With Bruce Wayne's return, Grayson went back to being Nightwing.

=== Jason Todd ===
Cover art of Batman #428 (December 1988) from the storyline A Death in the Family, art by Mike Mignola

DC was initially hesitant to turn Grayson into Nightwing and to replace him with a new Robin. To minimize the change, they made the new Robin, Jason Todd, who first appeared in Batman #357 (1983), similar to a young Grayson. Like Dick Grayson, Jason Todd was the son of circus acrobats murdered by a criminal (this time the Batman adversary Killer Croc), and then adopted by Bruce Wayne. In this incarnation, he was originally red-haired and unfailingly cheerful, and wore his circus costume to fight crime until Dick Grayson presented him with a Robin suit of his own. At that point, he dyed his hair black.

After the miniseries Crisis on Infinite Earths, much of the DC Comics continuity was redone. Dick Grayson's origin, years with Batman, and growth into Nightwing remained mostly unchanged; but Todd's character was completely revised. He was now a black-haired street orphan who first encountered Batman when he attempted to steal tires from the Batmobile. Batman saw to it that he was placed in a school for troubled youths. Weeks later, after Dick Grayson became Nightwing and Todd proved his crime-fighting worth by helping Batman catch a gang of robbers, Batman offered Todd the position as Robin.

Believing that readers never truly bonded with Todd, DC Comics made the controversial decision in 1988 to poll readers using a 1-900 number as to whether or not Todd should be killed. The event received more attention in the mainstream media than any other comic book event before it. Many outside the comic book community mistakenly thought DC was considering killing Dick Grayson, unaware he had been replaced as Robin. Readers voted "yes" by a small margin (5,343 to 5,271) and Todd was subsequently murdered by the Joker in the storyline, A Death in the Family, in which the psychopath beat the youngster severely with a crowbar, and left him to die in a warehouse rigged with a bomb.

Jason Todd later returned as the new Red Hood (the original alias of the Joker) when he was brought back to life due to reality being altered. After the continuity changes following the New 52 DC Comics relaunch, Jason becomes a leader of the Outlaws, a superhero team that includes Starfire and Arsenal who had spent years with Grayson in the Titans.

=== Tim Drake ===
DC Comics was left uncertain about readers' decision to have Jason Todd killed, wondering if readers preferred Batman as a lone vigilante, disliked Todd specifically, wanted the mantle of Robin returned to Dick Grayson, or just wanted to see if DC would actually kill the character. In addition, the 1989 Batman film did not feature Robin, giving DC a reason to keep him out of the comic book series for marketing purposes. Regardless, Batman editor Dennis O'Neil introduced a new Robin. The third Robin, Timothy Drake, first appeared in a flashback in Batman #436 (1989) as a preadolescent boy, introduced by writer Marv Wolfman, interior penciler Pat Broderick, and inker John Beatty. Drake's first name was a nod to Tim Burton, director of the 1989 Batman film. The character first donned the Robin costume, and became associated with the third version of Robin, in the acclaimed "A Lonely Place of Dying" sequel storyline, which culminated in issue #442, written by Marv Wolfman with cover art by George Pérez, storyline interior pencils by Pérez, Tom Grummett, as well as Jim Aparo, and inks by Mike DeCarlo. In addition to establishing Tim Drake as a principal character in Batman and Detective Comics, Lauren R. O'Connor argues that "A Lonely Place of Dying" served as the denouement of a transition from Dick Grayson's "absent sexuality," which earlier incited reader interpretations of homosexuality, to definitive heterosexual presence as a maturation narrative. O'Connor offers multiple examples from this 1989 storyline, such as Drake's encounter with Starfire and Grayson's heeding of Drake's concerns over Batman's psychology, to substantiate the notion of a heterosexual bildungsroman subplot.

The ensuing Tim Drake storylines, authored by Alan Grant and penciled by Norm Breyfogle, coupled with the 1989 release of Burton's Batman, spurred sales of both comic book titles Batman and Detective Comics. For the latter, Grant attested in 2007 that "when the Batman movie came out, the sales went up, if I recall correctly, from around 75,000 to about 675,000." 1989–90 was indeed the "Year of the Bat:" Capital and Diamond City Distributors reported that the Year One-inspired Batman: Legends of the Dark Knight dominated four out of the five spots for preorders (not total sales and second printings). The only exception was the third preorder spot, snagged by Batman #442, the conclusion to Tim Drake's "A Lonely Place of Dying" storyline. The "Year of the Bat" continued into the first half of 1990. Preorders for Batman and Detective Comics issues featuring a revived Joker and Penguin began to compete with, and even edged out, the last three parts of Grant Morrison's and Klaus Janson's Gothic storyline in Legends. Todd McFarlane's Spider-Man arrived in the second half of 1990, inaugurating six months of Spidermania (or Mcfarlamania, depending on the reader). DC closed out 1990 with vendors under-ordering issues, prompting the publisher to push Batman #457 and the first part of the Robin mini-series into second and then third printings. The next year, 1991, witnessed the ascension of Chris Claremont's, Jim Lee's, and Scott Williams's X-Men against Magneto, as well as Fabian Nicieza's and Rob Liefeld's X-Force, into the top of the preorder rankings. The only exception to this X-mania was, again, Tim Drake and the sequel to the Robin miniseries, the first variant issue of which garnered the third spot, firmly wedged between variant issues of X-Force and X-Men. The mini-series pitted solo Robin against the Joker, in response to fan demands for a matchup since "A Death in the Family." The 1990s comic booming bust had begun. In a supplemental interview with Daniel Best, Alan Grant added that "every issue from about that time [after the 'Year of the Bat'] that featured Robin sales went up because Robin did have his own fans." Although both Grant and Breyfogle initially believed that their Anarky character could potentially become the third version of Robin, they were quick to support the editorial decision to focus on Drake. The social anarchist duo adopted the character as their own in the early 1990s, during Grant's shift to libertarian socialism but before his late 1990s emphasis on Neo Tech. Breyfogle agreed that "it was a big thing to bring in the new Robin, yes. I know my fans often point specifically to that double page splash where his costume first appears as a big event for them as fans and I usually have to point out to them that Neal Adams was the one who designed the costume. The 'R' symbol and the staff were all that was really mine." In the "Rite of Passage" storyline for Detective Comics, Grant and Breyfogle intertwined 1) Drake matching wits with Anarky; 2) a criminal and anthropological investigation into an apocryphal Haitian vodou cult (revealed by Batman, asserting anthropological and investigative authority, as a front for extortion and crony capitalism); 3) the murder of Drake's mother by vilified cult leaders; 4) the beginning of Drake's recurrent nightmares and trauma; as well as 5) the perspective of a child of one of the cult's Haitian followers, unknowingly and inadvertently orphaned by Batman at the end of the four-issue arc.

Tim Drake eventually transitioned from late preadolescence to adolescence, becoming the third Robin over the course of the storylines "Rite of Passage" and "Identity Crisis", with all issues scripted by Alan Grant and penciled by Norm Breyfogle. Story arcs that included Drake only in subplots or featured his training in criminal investigation, such as "Crimesmith" and "The Penguin Affair," were either written or co-written by Grant and Wolfman, with pencils by Breyfogle, Aparo, and M. D. Bright. Immediately afterwards, the character starred in the five-issue miniseries Robin, written by Chuck Dixon, with interior pencils by Tom Lyle and cover art by Brian Bolland. The new Batman and Robin team went on their first official mission together in the story "Debut", again written by Grant and penciled by Breyfogle. Lauren R. O'Connor contends that, in early Tim Drake appearances, writers such as Grant and Chuck Dixon "had a lexicon of teenage behavior from which to draw, unlike when Dick Grayson was introduced and the concept of the teenager was still nascent. They wisely mobilized the expected adolescent behaviors of parental conflict, hormonal urges, and identity formation to give Tim emotional depth and complexity, making him a relatable character with boundaries between his two selves." In the Robin ongoing series, when Drake had fully transitioned into an adolescent character, Chuck Dixon depicted him as engaging in adolescent intimacy, yet still stopped short at overt heterosexual consummation. This narrative benchmark maintained Robin's "estrangement from sex" that began in the Grayson years. Erica McCrystal likewise observes that Alan Grant, prior to Dixon's series, connected Drake to Batman's philosophy of heroic or anti-heroic "vigilantism" as "therapeutic for children of trauma. But this kind of therapy has a delicate integration process." The overcoming of trauma entailed distinct identity intersections and emotional restraint, as well as a "complete understanding" of symbol and self. Bruce Wayne, a former child of trauma, guided "other trauma victims down a path of righteousness." Tim Drake, for example, endured trauma and "emotional duress" as a result of the death of his mother (father in a coma and on a ventilator). Drake contemplated the idea of fear, and overcoming it, in both the "Rite of Passage" and "Identity Crisis" storylines. Grant and Breyfogle subjected Drake to recurrent nightmares, from hauntings by a ghoulish Batman to the disquieting lullaby (or informal nursery rhyme), "My Mummy's dead...My Mummy's Dead...I can't get it through my head," echoing across a cemetery for deceased parents. Drake ultimately defeated his own preadolescent fears "somewhat distant from Bruce Wayne" and "not as an orphan." By the end of "Identity Crisis", an adolescent Drake had "proven himself as capable of being a vigilante" by deducing the role of fear in instigating a series of violent crimes.

In the comics, Tim Drake was a late preadolescent boy who had followed the adventures of Batman and Robin ever since witnessing the murder of the Flying Graysons. This served to connect Drake to Grayson, establishing a link that DC hoped would help readers accept this new Robin. Drake surmised their secret identities with his amateur but instinctive detective skills and followed their careers closely. Tim stated on numerous occasions that he wishes to become "The World's Greatest Detective", a title currently belonging to the Dark Knight. Batman himself stated that one day Drake will surpass him as a detective. Despite his combat skills not being the match of Grayson's (although there are some similarities, in that they are far superior to Todd's when he was Robin), his detective skills more than make up for this. In addition, Batman supplied him with a new armored costume for his transition to the adolescent Robin.

Tim Drake's first Robin costume had a red torso, yellow stitching and belt, black boots, and green short sleeves, gloves, pants, and domino mask. He wore a cape that was black on the outside and yellow on the inside. This costume had an armored tunic and gorget, an emergency "R" shuriken on his chest in addition to the traditional batarangs and a collapsible bo staff as his primary weapon, which Tim Drake continues to use as the superhero Red Robin. Neal Adams redesigned the entire costume with the exception of the "R" shuriken logo, first sketched by Norm Breyfogle.

Tim Drake is the first Robin to have his own comic book series, where he fought crime on his own. Tim Drake, as Robin, co-founded the superhero team Young Justice in the absence of the Teen Titans of Dick Grayson's generation, but would then later re-form the Teen Titans after Young Justice disbanded following a massive sidekick crossover during which Donna Troy was killed. Tim served as leader of this version of the Titans until 2009, at which point he quit due to the events of Batman R.I.P.

Following Infinite Crisis and 52, Tim Drake modified his costume to favor a mostly red and black color scheme in tribute to his friend, Superboy (Kon-El), who died fighting Earth-Prime Superboy. This Robin costume had a red torso, long sleeves, and pants. It also included black gloves and boots, yellow stitching and belt, and a black and yellow cape. Tim Drake continued the motif of a red and black costume when he assumed the role of Red Robin before and during the events of The New 52.

Tim Drake assumes the identity of the Red Robin after Batman's disappearance following the events of Final Crisis and "Battle for the Cowl" and Damian Wayne becoming Grayson's Robin. Following 2011's continuity changes resulting from The New 52 DC Comics relaunch, history was altered such that Tim Drake never took up the Robin mantle after Jason Todd's death, feeling that it would be inappropriate. Instead, he served as Batman's sidekick under the name of the Red Robin. However, in DC's Rebirth relaunch, his original origin was restored.

In 2020s comics tying in with DC's Infinite Frontier era, Drake returns to the Robin mantle as Batman's primary crime-fighting partner when Damian goes on a soul-searching journey. Meanwhile, in his solo adventures, he goes on his own soul-searching journey, and reconnects with his old friend Bernard Dowd, whom he begins to date. Tim later comes out to Batman and is accepted. His solo series Tim Drake: Robin explores a young adult Tim living alone at the marina, developing a closer relationship with Bernard, and adopting his own crime-fighting partner in the form of Sparrow (Darcy Thomas), a former member of the We Are Robin movement.

=== Stephanie Brown ===
Stephanie Brown, Tim Drake's girlfriend and the costumed adventurer previously known as the Spoiler, volunteered for the role of Robin upon Tim's resignation. Batman fired the Girl Wonder for not obeying his orders to the letter on two occasions. Stephanie then stole one of Batman's incomplete plans to control Gotham's crime and executed it. Trying to prove her worthiness, Brown inadvertently set off a gang war on the streets of Gotham. While trying to help end the war, Brown was captured and tortured by Black Mask. She managed to escape, but apparently died shortly afterwards due to the severity of her injuries. Tim Drake keeps a memorial for her in his cave hideout underneath Titans Tower in San Francisco. She appeared alive and stalking Tim, after his return from traveling around the globe with his mentor. It turned out that Dr. Leslie Thompkins had faked Stephanie's death in an effort to protect her. For years she operated on and off as the Spoiler, but was then recruited as Barbara Gordon's replacement as Batgirl. She had her own series, as well as making appearances throughout various Batman and Batman spin-off series. Her time as the Spoiler, Robin, and Batgirl was retconned to have never occurred after the Flashpoint event, with her being reintroduced having just become the Spoiler in Batman Eternal. However, her history as Robin was later restored.

=== Damian Wayne ===
Damian Wayne was the child of Bruce Wayne and Talia al Ghul, thus the grandson of the immortal Ra's al Ghul. Batman was unaware of his son's existence for years until Talia left Damian in his care. Damian was violent and lacking in discipline and morality, and was trained by the League of Assassins. Learning to kill at a young age, Damian's murderous behavior created a troubled relationship with his father, who vowed never to take a life.

Conceived to become a host for his maternal grandfather's soul as well as a pawn against the Dark Knight, Batman saved his child from this fate, which forced Ra's to inhabit his own son's body, and thus, Damian was affectionate to his father. After Batman's apparent death during Final Crisis, Talia left her son under Dick Grayson and Alfred Pennyworth's care and Damian was deeply affected by his father's absence. In the first issue of "Battle for the Cowl", Damian was driving the Batmobile and was attacked by Poison Ivy and Killer Croc. Damian was rescued by Nightwing, who then tries to escape, but was shot down by Black Mask's men. Nightwing tried to fight the thugs, but the thugs were shot by Jason Todd. After a fight between Nightwing and Todd, Todd eventually shot Damian in the chest. In the final issue of the series, Alfred made Damian into Robin. Damian's first task as Robin was to rescue Tim. After "Battle for the Cowl", Grayson adopted the mantle of Batman, and instead of having Tim (whom he viewed as an equal rather than a protégé) remain as Robin, he gave the role to Damian, who he felt needed the training that his father would have given him.

Following the Batman: The Return of Bruce Wayne and Flashpoint events, Bruce Wayne returned to his role as Batman, while Dick resumed as Nightwing. As of The New 52, Damian continued to work with his father, but temporarily gave up being Robin (as his mother had put a price on his head), and went under the identity of Red Bird. Damian met his end at the hands of the Heretic, an aged clone of Damian working for Leviathan, bravely giving up his life. Despite his status as deceased, Damian starred in his own miniseries, Damian: Son of Batman, written and drawn by Andy Kubert, set in a future where Damian is on the path to become Batman after his father fell victim to a trap set by the Joker. Batman eventually started a difficult quest to resurrect him, returning Damian to life with Darkseid's Chaos Shard.

=== Clone of Bruce Wayne ===
Failsafe created a clone of Bruce Wayne to serve as his Robin of Zur-En-Arrh in retaliation for Damian Wayne rejecting him. Failsafe made it start to rapidly age to prevent it from rebelling against him. Robin got away following Failsafe's defeat. With his memories awakening, Robin made his way to Crime Alley to attack any criminals that entered there. Batman and Mister Terrific arrived to confront him. When Robin reached Batman's age, he severed his right hand so that it can be transplanted onto Batman. (Note: Batman previously lost his hand when fighting an alternate reality's version of Ghost-Breaker in Batman Vol. 3 #134 and got a cybernetic replacement in Batman Vol. 3 #135.) When Robin became elderly, he was taken to see the graves to Thomas Wayne, Martha Wayne, and Alfred Pennyworth until he died peacefully in Batman's presence. Batman buried his clone on the property of Pennyworth Manor.

== Other versions ==
=== Batman Beyond ===
In Future's End and DC Rebirth, Terry McGinnis's brother Matt becomes Robin to save his brother from the villain Payback. Initially excited about the role, Matt was eventually asked to stop being Robin after his encounter with the Joker.

=== Batman: Digital Justice ===
In the digitally rendered tale Batman: Digital Justice, James Gordon, the grandson of his namesake, Commissioner Gordon, takes on the mantle of the Batman. A character named Robert Chang, who is somewhat reminiscent of the post-Crisis Jason Todd, takes on the mantle of Robin.

=== Batman '89: Drake Winston ===
In 2021, DC published Batman '89, a limited series that served as a continuation of Tim Burton's Batman films Batman and Batman Returns and ignores the subsequent films Batman Forever (1995) and Batman & Robin (1997), in which actor Michael Keaton did not appear following Burton's departure from the franchise. This series featured a new version of Robin named Drake Winston; his appearance is inspired by Marlon Wayans, who was originally attached to play the role in the Burton films. Winston is a mechanic who works at Royal Autobody, an auto shop in Burnside. He strongly dislikes cops and authority figures and dresses up as a masked vigilante at night to help the residents of his neighborhood. He is initially distrustful of both Bruce Wayne and Batman, but after witnessing his dedication towards helping people and figuring out they are the same person, the two become partners and work together to stop Dent and arsonists terrorizing the city.

In the series follow-up, Batman '89: Echoes, Winston works together with Batman and Barbara Gordon to investigate and later stop Jonathan Crane and Ra's al Ghul from distributing fear toxin. He dons a suit reminiscent of Nightwing's New 52 red costume and the Robin design from Batman & Robin. He also has a group of colleagues that help him monitor the city and fight criminals known as "The Nightwings."

=== Dick Grayson (Earth Two) ===
The Robin of Earth-Two is a parallel version of the fictional DC Comics superhero, who was introduced after DC Comics created Earth-Two, a parallel world that was retroactively established as the home of characters which had been published in the Golden Age of comic books. This allowed creators to publish comic books featuring Robin while being able to disregard Golden Age stories, solving an incongruity, as Robin had been published as a single ongoing incarnation since inception. Robin's history is the same as his mainline counterpart, but does not occur in a floating timeline.

=== Talon (Earth-3) ===
The second Talon is a fictional character shown in Teen Titans #38 (2006), the former sidekick of Owlman, created by Geoff Johns and Tony S. Daniel. He is a former member of the Crime Society and a member of the Teen Titans during the one-year gap after Infinite Crisis. According to an interview with Tony Daniel at Newsarama, Talon was intended to resemble his mentor Owlman. It was revealed in The Search for Ray Palmer: Crime Society that there have been several Talons. The first one is shown dressed parallel to that of Grayson's classic Robin costume, including brown pixie boots. On post-Crisis Earth-3, the Teen Titans' Talon and Duela Dent, the daughter of the Jokester, had been dating. When Duela revealed their relationship to her parents, her father denounced her and the two fled. It is unknown how the two managed to flee to New Earth, or what has happened to Talon beyond that.

=== Bruce Wayne Junior ===
In "The Second Batman and Robin Team" (Batman #131, April 1960), Bruce Wayne's butler Alfred writes a story about the possible future of Batman and Robin. In it, Bruce Wayne marries Kathy Kane (Batwoman) and they have a son named Bruce Jr. When Wayne retires as Batman, Dick Grayson takes over the role of the Caped Crusader. Bruce Jr., having secretly trained on his own, volunteers to become the new Robin. Several subsequent "imaginary stories" featuring Bruce Jr. followed; the last in this series was "Bat-Girl—Batwoman II" in Batman #163 (May 1964). Bruce Wayne Jr next appeared in World's Finest Comics #215 (January 1973) as one of the Super-Sons.

Byrne revisited Bruce Jr. in his Superman & Batman: Generations series. There, Bruce Junior is son of Bruce Senior and his wife, who is never identified but is implied to be Julie Madison. "BJ" greatly desires to be a hero and trains in the hopes of following in his father's footsteps. His mother refuses to let BJ become Robin until he turns eighteen. On Halloween night of 1964, when BJ is fifteen, he and Superman's daughter Kara (Supergirl) sneak out to have an adventure and, with the help of Wonder Woman's daughter Wonder Girl and The Flash's nephew Kid Flash join forces to defeat some of Flash's Rogue's Gallery. Afterward they decide to form their own team called the Justice League. BJ and Kara become romantically involved as adults, but BJ puts the relationship on hold when Joker kills Dick, forcing him to become the third Batman. BJ and Kara eventually marry, but their wedding is halted by Kara's brother Joel Kent. Joel, who had been manipulated his whole life by Lex Luthor to hate his family, kills Kara by punching through her chest. Joel dies shortly thereafter, and BJ agrees to raise his son in order to prevent another such tragedy from happening (he also marries Joel's widow, Mei-Lai, sometime in the intervening years). The child, named Clark Wayne, becomes BJ's Robin and is offered the mantle of Batman when he becomes an adult. Clark turns it down, having deduced that he is not BJ's biological son, and believing that only a real Wayne should be Batman, instead adopts the identity of Knightwing. In the 1990s, BJ goes on a quest to locate his missing father, whom he eventually discovers as having taken over Ra's al Ghul's criminal empire and turned it into a force for good. Bruce asks BJ to assume control of the organization so that he can become Batman once again. A story in Generations II has Bruce's dying wife imply that BJ is not his biological son, but this is not explored until Generations III, where BJ uses a Lazarus Pit and becomes Robin once more, ultimately learning that he truly is Bruce's son and everything was a plan by his mother to make up for never allowing father and son to work together as heroes. In Generations III, BJ's life is greatly extended by the use of the Lazarus Pit so he can help the human resistance battle the forces of Darkseid, but when he is mortally wounded he decides to die, feeling that he has kept Kara waiting far too long.

=== Deathwing ===
Introduced as an alternative Dick Grayson in the pages of Team Titans from a timeline when his Titan teammate Donna Troy had a son who was driven mad, took on the mantle of Lord Chaos and conquered his world. This version of Dick stayed in his identity of Nightwing and helped train squadrons of superpowered teenagers that became known as the Teen Titans. He was involved with the much younger Titan Mirage during this time. This alternative-future Nightwing came back in time and briefly joins the Team Titans when their mission takes them to the present. This version of Nightwing, attacked and corrupted by a dark version of Raven shortly after his arrival, changes his name to "Deathwing", and serves as her assistant. He becomes so twistedly evil that he at one point tracks down his one-time lover, Mirage, and rapes her. She becomes pregnant and has a child named Julienne.

During the Zero Hour event that retroactively erased this timeline, Mirage, Terra and Deathwing survive. It is later established that they are from the current timeline, and were shunted through time and given false memories by the Time Trapper, who wished to use them as sleeper agents against the time travel villain Extant. It is later revealed that Deathwing was not Dick Grayson, with his true identity never being uncovered.

=== Red Robin ===
In Kingdom Come (a post-Infinite Crisis Earth-22), a middle-aged Dick Grayson reclaims the Robin mantle and becomes Red Robin, not at the side of his former mentor Batman, but rather with Superman's League. His uniform is closer to Batman's in design, rather than any previous Robin uniform. Age has not slowed him down, as he possesses all of his stealth and fighting skills. In this story he has a daughter with Starfire; Mar'i Grayson (Nightstar). Starfire has apparently died by the time of the story, according to the Elliot S. Maggin novelization, and Nightstar calls Bruce Wayne "Grandpa", despite no blood relation. At the end of the comic and the novel, Bruce and Dick reconcile.

Red Robin reappeared in promotional material for the DC Countdown to Final Crisis event. Eventually, it was revealed that this Red Robin was not Dick Grayson, but rather Jason Todd who appeared under the cape and cowl. The Red Robin costume was stated to be more symbolism, than an actual costume choice, as Jason has been both the Red Hood and Robin, being shown as Red Robin.

However, in Countdown to Final Crisis #17, Jason dons a Red Robin suit from a display case in the "Bat Bunker" (Earth-51's equivalent to the Bat Cave) as he and Earth-51 Batman join the fight raging on the Earth above the bunker. Jason keeps his new suit and identity for the rest of his tenure as a "Challenger of the Unknown", only to discard it on his return to New Earth and revert to his "Red Hood" street clothing.

During the Scattered Pieces tie-in to Batman R.I.P., a new Red Robin makes his appearance, at first only as a glimmering image following Robin (Tim Drake) and suspected to have stolen a briefcase of money from the Penguin. Tim initially suspects Jason Todd of reprising his Red Robin persona. Jason claims innocence, supposing that someone may have stolen his suit when he discarded it earlier. The new Red Robin breaks up a scuffle between Tim and Jason, and later is revealed to be Ulysses Armstrong. Armstrong later changes costumes when he reveals himself to be the new Anarky, and after being severely burned in an explosion, an embattled Tim Drake dons the less-revealing Red Robin costume to hide his wounds. He later returns to his standard uniform.

In 2009, a new on-going series was introduced titled Red Robin. The new Red Robin was revealed to be Tim Drake.

In 2014-5's Multiversity series, a Red Robin also appears as part of Superman's darker incarnation of the Justice League on Earth-22, still based on the alternate future continuity of Kingdom Come.

=== Earth-6: Stan Lee's Robin ===
A version of Robin exists for Stan Lee's Just Imagine... line of comics, in which DC Comics characters were re-imagined by Marvel Comics luminary Stan Lee. Robin is an orphan who has been forced by Reverend Darkk, the series' main villain, into becoming a thief and a murderer. He meets Batman when Darkk assigns Robin to kill him. Batman survives the attack and in return shows Robin what kind of a man Darkk really is. Robin joins the good side for a time, but in the crisis issue it is revealed that Robin has in fact been working with Darkk the whole time; in the end he is transformed into a "Hawk Man", before being reborn through Yggdrasil as the "Atom". In the current New 52 DC Multiverse, these events took place on Earth-6.

=== DC One Million ===
In DC One Million setting, the Batman of the 853rd Century is aided by the robot called Robin the Toy Wonder. This Batman's parents were guards on the prison planet of Pluto and died in a prison riot that turned into a mass slaughter of the guards. Robin is programmed with the personality of this Batman as a boy and acts as a foil/source of perspective so that he will not become consumed by darkness in his quest for justice. This Robin believes this was the same reason Bruce Wayne brought Dick Grayson into his life.

=== Earth-31: Robin Redblade ===
On this alternate Earth, accelerated climate change has resulted in rapid sea level rise, transforming Earth-31 into a devastated waterworld. On the craft Flying Fox, Robin Redblade is one of the crew, and the vessel is piloted by Captain Leatherwing (Batman of Earth-31). Earth-31 also seems to have its own Teen Titans, and Robin Redblade is a member.

=== Dick Grayson (Earth-43) ===
In this universe, the setting of Batman & Dracula: Red Rain and its sequels, the Flying Graysons are killed by the vampire Batman, as shown in DC Infinite Halloween Special. Dick grows up to become an obsessive vampire hunter, but is turned by Batman in The Search for Ray Palmer: Red Rain, and becomes his partner. Robin has remained a vampire and is now a member of the "Blood League", a vampire Justice League, alongside Earth-43's Vampire Batman.

=== Dick Grayson (Earth-50) ===
In the Wildstorm universe, Dick Grayson is a Planetary agent in Gotham City, partnered with a man named Jasper who resembles the Joker. He appears in Planetary/Batman: Night on Earth, prior to the Planetary team's shift into universes with a Batman. However, given the events of Flashpoint, this alternate Earth was merged with Earth-0 and Earth-13 and therefore this character no longer exists in main DC continuity.

=== The Dark Knight Universe Robins ===
These stories are set in Frank Miller's Dark Knight Universe, which is not considered in continuity with the monthly titles. Miller has stated that the Dark Knight Universe consists of Batman: Year One, All Star Batman & Robin, the Spawn/Batman crossover, The Dark Knight Returns, The Dark Knight Strikes Again and the cancelled Holy Terror, Batman! In this version, Batman looks upon his sidekicks as employees rather than proteges (although he refers to Robin as a protégé in All Star Batman and Robin #9), whom he threatens to "fire" from their "jobs", which he even does to Dick Grayson.

==== Dick Grayson ====
In Frank Miller's Dark Knight Universe, Grayson's origin differs in various ways to the official DC Comics Universe. As seen in the All Star Batman and Robin title, he is a twelve-year-old boy who performs in the circus with his parents as the Flying Graysons. Bruce Wayne had come to the show many times to watch him perform his stunts. One night, while Wayne watches the show with reporter Vicki Vale, the Graysons perform an amazing feat. The audience begin to cheer and clap when suddenly a man arrives and shoots Grayson's parents in the head.

Batman takes out the gunman while some corrupt Gotham City Police officers take Dick Grayson into custody. They take him instead to a place outside Gotham City, into a deserted stretch of forest where they torture or execute people, but Batman comes to the rescue. Batman takes Dick into the Batmobile and asks him to join him in his crusade against crime in Gotham City. Dick agrees to join the crusade. Upon arrival in the Batcave, Batman intends for Dick to survive in the cave without any help. However Alfred Pennyworth takes pity on Dick and gives him a meal and a decent place to sleep. Batman is displeased, as he wants Dick to go through the same things he did, whether Dick likes it or not.

Later, Batman brings in the killer of Dick's parents, a man called Jocko-boy Vanzetti. Batman tells him that even though Vanzetti killed his parents, someone else hired him to do so. Batman gives Grayson, who at the time had an axe, the choice of whether to kill Jocko-boy or not. Grayson cuts the tape over Vanzetti's mouth and asks him who hired him to kill his parents. The answer, much to Batman's disgust, is the Joker. Batman orders Grayson to make himself a costume. He does so using Robin Hood as an inspiration. He becomes an archer and wears a cape with a hood thus calling himself "Hood". Batman, upon seeing this, pulls his hood down, telling him that anyone could do simply that. Batman tells him to lose the hood and calls him Robin.

Sometime later, Batman fires Grayson for proving unsatisfactory, which strengthens the rift between the two, and they eventually part ways. In The Dark Knight Returns, Grayson is absent but mentioned several times. First, Commissioner Gordon asks Bruce if he has spoken with him recently, and Bruce coldly says he has not. Later, when Batman's new Robin, Carrie Kelley, rescues Batman and asks about his tank-like vehicle, Batman responds that "Dick called it the Batmobile", and later when Batman suffers a diabetic stroke, he desperately calls out Grayson's name. He is also shown talking to Grayson in his mind, such as when he calls the Mutant leader a "brand of evil we had never dreamed of." This seems to imply a sense of fatherly love otherwise not shown, or that Batman simply missed Grayson's company.

In The Dark Knight Strikes Again, Grayson re-appears as a genetically altered supervillain. Sometime after his dismissal, he apparently joined forces with senior villains such as Luthor, and underwent extensive gene manipulation to gain a healing factor and shapeshifting powers, but at the cost of his sanity. At the behest of the government, Grayson begins a maniacal crusade to hunt down and kill as many superheroes as possible, but in order to conceal his identity and partly due to a twisted revenge scheme on Batman, Grayson takes on the appearance of the Joker, who killed himself in The Dark Knight Returns.

After maiming and killing a number of heroes, such as Guardian, the Creeper and the Martian Manhunter, he seeks out Carrie Kelley, Batman's new partner, a.k.a. Catgirl, intending to kill her in order to exact his final revenge on Batman. Grayson confronts Carrie and Green Arrow in the sewers and engages them in battle. Carrie strikes him with thermite, acid and all sorts of chemicals that cause Grayson to explode, apparently killing him, but Saturn Girl later has a vision of a second encounter between Carrie and Grayson and reveals to Carrie that Grayson (though his identity is not yet revealed at this point) is still alive. Grayson eventually ambushes Carrie in the Batcave and proceeds to beat her brutally, lacerating her lips and breaking her bones one by one. Batman arrives and recognises Grayson when he activates the Batcave's self-destruct and Grayson attempts to shut it down with his old abort code, prompting him to revert to his original form and costume. As Elongated Man takes Carrie to safety, Batman and Grayson contemptuously go over their bleak history together, with Grayson even admitting that despite his harsh treatment, he loved Batman like a father. The two eventually fight, but Grayson remains unharmed by everything Batman throws at him: when Batman beheads him with an axe, Grayson effortlessly catches his head and places it back on his neck. Eventually, Batman hurls himself and Grayson into a pit of lava beneath the Batcave; Grayson falls into the lava and is totally disintegrated, thereby leaving nothing left of Grayson for him to grow back, while Batman is rescued by Superman. As Grayson's remains disappear, Batman acknowledges his ward's demise with a sad "So long, Boy Wonder".

==== Jason Todd ====
In Batman: The Dark Knight Returns, Jason Todd is referred to have died in the line of duty, although the exact details are not given. It is revealed in the prestige format one-shot Dark Knight Returns: The Last Crusade, co-written by Miller and Brian Azzarello, release on June 15, 2016. It is revealed that after Jason defeats and captures the Joker; the villain becomes fixated on him. After the Joker escaped, Jason tracks his whereabouts on his own, and is brutally beaten to death by the Joker's men.

=== Trinity ===
In the Trinity series, reality is altered, removing Superman, Batman and Wonder Woman from the timeline. In this alternative world, "Richie" Grayson is a member of the Zucco mob.

=== Elseworlds ===
Alfred is a familiar character in the Batman books as Bruce Wayne's elderly butler. However, in Batman: Dark Allegiances, set in the World War II era, Batman, Catwoman, and Alfred were recruited to fight behind enemy lines in Nazi Germany in the winter of 1940. Alfred is given the codename Robin.

In Superman & Batman: Generations, Dick Grayson is Robin until he goes to college. The role is then taken up by Batman's son, Bruce Wayne Junior, against his mother's wishes. However, he gives up the role when Dick is murdered, in order to become Batman. Several years later, Clark Wayne, the biological son of Joel Kent and adopted son of Bruce Wayne Jr., takes on the role of Robin, before becoming Knightwing.

Set in the 1960s, Batman: Thrillkiller was written and drawn by Howard Chaykin and Dan Brereton and published in 1997–98. It has Bruce Wayne as a detective in the Gotham Police after his family was ruined by the Great Depression. Wayne Manor has been taken over by the rebellious and somewhat unhinged Barbara Gordon, daughter of police Commissioner James Gordon. Her live-in boyfriend is Richart Graustark, who goes under the name of "Dick Grayson", presumably to cover his German origins (World War II being still fresh in people's minds at the time). Barbara and Graustark fight crime as Batgirl and Robin, though, in true 1960s anti-establishment style, their main targets are corrupt cops, in particular those led by the Two-Face-like Detective Duell and the Joker-like but very feminine Bianca Steeplechase. In this version, Grayson's family are still circus acrobats, but their deaths are caused as a result of his activities as Robin rather than the traditional other way round. He is overcome by grief and rage over their murder and his subsequent recklessness leads to his own death. He is replaced as Barbara's partner by Wayne, who takes the identity of Batman, but the memory of him drives Barbara, wracked with guilt over an affair with Wayne and her failure to prevent Grayson's death, to the point of insanity. Becoming increasingly more violent and unstable, she adopts the Robin persona as part of seeking revenge against Steeplechase, who she later drowns. Within the New 52 DC Multiverse, Earth-37's 1960s seem comparable to those of Thrillkiller, although while it has a Batgirl, Robin and female Joker, it now seems to lack a Batman.

The main character in JLA: The Riddle of the Beast, young Robin Drake brings together all the heroes of The World to battle the Beast (Etrigan the Demon).

In the French Revolution set Batman: Reign of Terror, Bruce Wayne's sister learns his secret identity, and designs a Robin outfit to aid him.

Batman: Dark Knight Dynasty features three generations of Waynes, past, present and future. In the future section, Brenna Wayne is aided by an ape with augmented intelligence in a Robin costume, who goes by the name 'Rodney'.

In the American Civil War set The Blue, The Gray and the Bat, Captain Bruce Wayne is aided by a Native American named Redbird. Redbird's family were killed by white men, and, until he got his revenge, he wore war paint in a design similar to a domino mask.

In the futuristic Robin 3000, Earth is controlled by despotic aliens. Batman (Bruce Wayne XX) is killed trying to stop them, but his mission is continued by his nephew, Tom (Thomas) Wayne. This was created by P. Craig Russell in 1986 as Tom Swift 3000, but later rewritten in 1992 as a Robin story when the original plans fell through.

In the Robin 1996 Elseworlds annual, an unnamed young warrior in 16th century Japan is raised by the Bat-Samurai, and nicknamed Tengu, after the bird-spirits, by a female Cat-Ninja. Tengu loses his mentor in battle. Tengu was later revealed to be the rightful heir to the imperial throne, and the usurper (believing he knew this and plotted against him) attempted to kill him. He killed the usurper in self-defense but, since he had already sworn loyalty, was constrained to suicide as a result of this dishonor.

In the Detective Comics 1996 Elseworlds annual (Batman: Leatherwing), an orphan on the streets of 17th century Kingston who became cabin boy to Leatherwing the pirate.

In the Robin 1998 Legends of The Dead Earth annual, humanity is trying to reach other worlds in generation ships. On one of these, a group called the Proctors have seized control and everyone else are slaves who are executed on their 30th birthdays to conserve the ship's resources. Tris Plover, a 29-year-old slave, rebels against the Proctors. She meets another rebel, called the Batman, who gives her the Robin identity. At the cost of their lives, they succeed in defeating the Proctors and Robin sets the ship on a course for the planet New Gotham. "Bird Dark" is the name of Batman's partner in the somewhat garbled fables told on another colony world, as featured in the "Legends of the Dead Earth" Batman Annual #20. (1996) While the name is based on Nightwing, the costume is in Robin's colors.

In JLA: The Nail, Dick (as Robin), along with Barbara (as Batgirl) is tortured then murdered by The Joker with his Kryptonian gauntlets during a raid on Arkham Asylum, driving Batman temporarily insane after he witnesses their ordeals and death. The grief-stricken hero then kills Joker for revenge. Later, in the sequel JLA: Another Nail, Dick returns as a spirit after the Joker returns from Hell. He helps Batman defeats the Clown Prince of Crime once and for all, and gives Batman the strength to move on.

=== Tiny Titans ===
Tiny Titans is a series follows the exploits of the Teen Titans (and other DCU character), as grade school kids attending school for Super-hero sidekicks. Dick Grayson's Robin is a primary character in the series, and often tries to act like the leader, although the rest of the Tiny Titans rarely listen to him. He temporarily began wearing a kiddie version of his first Nightwing costume, but later went back to being Robin. Later issues eventually introduced Jason Todd and Tim Drake into the series as toddlers who Barbara Gordon babysits. Both Jason and Dick wear the original Robin costumes, while Tim wears the 2006 "One Year Later" Robin costume. Talon also appears as a frequent enemy of Robin, but in the conclusion of issue 46 he gets his hair cut like Robin by Alfred.

=== Batman: Year 100 ===
An alternative version of Robin appears in Paul Pope's Batman: Year 100 limited series. This Robin is a dark-skinned teenager who acts as Batman's partner as well as the mechanic for "the Batmobile", a high-tech motorcycle. Little is revealed about this Robin's backstory other than that he was apparently adopted by Batman at a young age, and that Robin is his real name rather than an alias. Unlike other iterations of the character, the Robin in "Year 100" does not wear a costume.

=== Pre-Crisis Hypertime ===
Hypertime is a fictional concept presented in the 1999 DC comic book series The Kingdom, to explain any continuity discrepancies in DC Universe stories and a variations of the Multiverse that existed before Crisis on Infinite Earths. During the "Hypertension" story arc, Superboy (Kon-El) travels through multiple realities battling Black Zero, an evil alternate version of himself who has been abducting alternate universe versions of Superboy. One of the alternate Superboys has become Batman's latest Robin.

=== Captain Carrot and His Amazing Zoo Crew ===
The 1980s series Captain Carrot and His Amazing Zoo Crew presented the parallel Earth of "Earth-C-Minus," a world populated by talking animal superheroes that paralleled the mainstream DC Universe. Earth-C-Minus was the home of Boyd, the Robin Wonder, a robin sidekick to the Batmouse, and presumably an analog of the mainstream DC Universe's Dick Grayson (including wearing a variant of Dick Grayson's Robin costume).

=== Injustice series ===
In the prequel comic of Injustice: Gods Among Us, Damian remains under the guise of Robin until Year Five where he becomes Nightwing. Although he will still become one of Superman's allies in his Regime. It is revealed in Year One that Dick Grayson's death at the hands of Damian Wayne was a mere accident because Damian was frustrated at Dick's lecturing him during a prison riot. In Year Two, Damian makes two minor appearances: once to alert Superman to Sinestro's arrival at the Justice League Watchtower, and again while Despero, having been assaulted by the Sinestro Corps, is crashing toward Earth. In Year Three, Damian attempts to defeat some villains and nearly gets killed but Dick Grayson, (now the new Deadman), saves him and gives him his old Nightwing costume as a birthday present, unaware to Damian or any other Regime members.

=== 52 Multiverse ===
In the final issue of 52, a new Multiverse is revealed, originally consisting of 52 identical realities. Among the parallel realities shown is one designated "Earth-2". Due to Mister Mind's actions, this universe takes on visual aspects similar to the Pre-Crisis Earth-2, including Robin, among other Justice Society of America characters. Based on comments by Grant Morrison, this alternate universe is not the pre-Crisis Earth-2. However, in Justice Society of America Annual #1, published in 2008, the Silver Scarab explains that the events of the Crisis are remembered by the people of this Earth-2, and from their perspective, Earth-2 seemed to be the only Earth to have survived the Crisis, raising theories as to whether or not Earth-2 was really destroyed, or was perhaps replaced by a new Earth-2. Indeed, in Justice Society of America #20, published in December 2008, Starman explains that during the re-expansion of the DC Multiverse, Earth-2 was reborn "along with everyone on it", including Robin.

Following Flashpoint (2011) and The New 52 reboot, this Earth is replaced by another reimagining of Earth 2, one where Batman's daughter Helena Wayne served as Robin until an incident five years prior to the relaunch sent her to DC's primary continuity, Earth-0, where she works as the Huntress. The 2014 series Earth 2: World's End establishes that Dick Grayson never served as Robin on this Earth, and was instead a reporter who married Barbara Gordon and had a son. During Darkseid's invasion of Earth 2, Barbara is killed, and Dick is trained in how to fight by Ted Grant and goes on a mission to find his missing son.

=== Absolute Universe ===
In the Absolute Universe, appearing in Absolute Batman, the Robins are a paramilitary force of young people led by Slade Wilson, consisting of Dick Grayson, Jason Todd, Tim Drake, Stephanie Brown, and Duke Thomas, created to hunt down Batman after he was framed for the murder of James Gordon. In this universe, the Robins are not adopted by Bruce Wayne, but by Jack Grimm V, the Joker, and are antagonists. To hunt down the Batman, they are equipped with high tech armor and giant robotic mech suits.

== Robin monthlies ==
The first Robin miniseries was printed in 1992 following Tim Drake's debut as Robin. The series centered around Tim's continued training and set up villains linked to the character. It was followed up by another series Robin II: The Joker's Wild!, which pitted Tim against his predecessor's murderer the Joker. With Batman out of town, it was up to Tim and Alfred to end the Joker's latest crime spree. A final miniseries, Robin III: Cry of the Huntress wrapped up the trilogy, teaming Tim with the Huntress. In 1993, the success of the three miniseries led to the ongoing Robin series, which ran 183 issues until 2009. The title was replaced by a Batman and Robin series following the Battle for the Cowl miniseries, as well as an ongoing Red Robin monthly which continues the story of Tim Drake.

The ongoing Robin series has taken part in a number of crossovers with other comics, especially Batman and related series. These include:

- Robin (vol. 2) #7: Knightquest: The Search
- Robin (vol. 2) #8: KnightsEnd
- Robin (vol. 2) #9: KnightsEnd: Aftermath
- Robin (vol. 2) #11–13: Prodigal
- Robin (vol. 2) #14: Troika
- Robin (vol. 2) #27–28: Batman: Contagion
- Robin (vol. 2) #32–33: Batman: Legacy
- Robin (vol. 2) #52–53: Batman: Cataclysm
- Robin (vol. 2) #67–73: Batman: No Man's Land
- Robin (vol. 2) #86: Batman: Officer Down
- Robin (vol. 2) #95: Joker: Last Laugh
- Robin (vol. 2) #98–99: Bruce Wayne: Murderer?
- Robin (vol. 2) #129–131: Batman: War Games
- Robin (vol. 2) #168–169: The Resurrection of Ra's al Ghul
- Robin (vol. 2) #175–176: Batman R.I.P.

In addition, two Robin-related series launched in June 2015: We Are Robin, featuring writer Lee Bermejo and artists Rob Haynes and Khary Randolph, and detailing multiple teenagers in Gotham who take up the mantle of Robin; and Robin, Son of Batman, written and drawn by Patrick Gleason, showing the individual adventures of Damian Wayne.

== Reception ==
According to Entertainment Weekly in 2008, Robin is one of the "greatest sidekicks".

== In other media ==
Robin in Teen Titans Go!

Robin (Dick Grayson) was portrayed by Douglas Croft and Johnny Duncan, respectively, in the 1943 and 1949 fifteen chapter Batman serials. Burt Ward played him in the 1966–1968 Batman television series and the related 1966 film. In the live-action movies Batman Forever and Batman & Robin, he was played by Chris O'Donnell. Michael Cera voiced the character in The Lego Batman Movie.

In The Dark Knight Rises, as part of The Dark Knight trilogy, Detective John Blake was played by Joseph Gordon-Levitt, though as a homage to the character, where his full legal name is revealed in the ending to be Robin John Blake.

The Dick Grayson version of Robin also appears in Batman: The Animated Series, voiced by Loren Lester. Grayson is replaced by Tim Drake, played by Mathew Valencia, in the subsequent series The New Batman Adventures.

An older version of Robin / Dick Grayson is portrayed by Brenton Thwaites in the live action series Titans.

The animated series Teen Titans features Robin (voiced by Scott Menville) as the leader of a team of young heroes; it is hinted in several episodes that this Robin is Dick Grayson. Menville reprises his role as Robin in Teen Titans Go!. The second-season episode "The Best Robin" introduces Carrie Kelley and Tim Drake as their Robins. They are also voiced by Menville.

Robin is also seen in the 1987 Zeller's commercial, which features the infamous catchphrase, "Well said, Robin!".

Dick Grayson is Robin in Young Justice, voiced by Jesse McCartney. In the second season, Grayson has become Nightwing, while Tim Drake, voiced by Cameron Bowen, is the new Robin, succeeding Jason Todd, who is already dead by the start of the season.

Robin is portrayed by Nick Lang in Holy Musical B@man!. His portrayal is based mainly on Burt Ward's Dick Grayson.

The Damian Wayne version of Robin will appear in the live action film The Brave and the Bold, set in the DC Universe (DCU) media franchise.

The Dick Grayson and Jason Todd incarnations of Robin will be featured in the animated film Dynamic Duo, focused on their origin story as the "Dynamic Duo". The film is being produced by DC Studios, Warner Bros. Pictures Animation, and 6th & Idaho for a theatrical release.

== Collected editions ==
Title	Material collected	Pages	Publication date	ISBN
Dick Grayson
Robin: The Bronze Age Omnibus	Batman #192, 202–203, 227, 229–231, 234–236, 239, 240–242, 244–245, 248, 250, 252, 254, 259, 333, 337–339, 341–343; Detective Comics #390–391, 394–395, 398–403, 445, 447, 450–451, 481–485; Batman Family #1, 3, 4–9, 11–20; World's Finest Comics #200, DC Comics Presents #31, 58	912	March 2020	978-1779500854
Robin: Year One	Robin: Year One #1–4	186	May 2002	978-1563898051
Batgirl/Robin Year One	Robin: Year One #1–4, Batgirl: Year One #1–9	424	June 2013	978-1401240332
Tim Drake
Robin: A Hero Reborn	Robin #1–5	192	February 1998	978-1563890291
Robin: Tragedy and Triumph	Robin II: The Joker's Wild! #1–4, Detective Comics #618–621	192	November 1993	978-1563890789
Robin: Flying Solo	Robin (vol. 2) #1–5	144	July 2000	978-1563896095
Robin Vol. 1: Reborn	Batman #455–457; Detective Comics #618–621; Robin #1–5	296	November 10, 2015	978-1401258573
Robin Vol. 2: Triumphant	Batman #465, 467–469; Robin II: The Joker's Wild! #1–4; Robin III: Cry of the Huntress #1–6	360	March 22, 2016	978-1401260897
Robin Vol. 3: Solo	Robin (vol. 2) #1–5; Robin Annual #1–2; Showcase '93 #5–6, 11–12	328	December 6, 2016	978-1401263621
Robin Vol. 4: Turning Point	Robin (vol. 2) #6–13; Showcase '94 #5–6	264	July 25, 2017	978-1401265878
Robin Vol. 5: War of the Dragons	Robin (vol. 2) #14–22; Robin Annual #3; Detective Comics #685–686	328	January 2, 2018	978-1401275129
Robin: Unmasked	Robin (vol. 2) #121–125	128	September 2004	978-1401202354
Robin/Batgirl: Fresh Blood	Robin (vol. 2) #132–133, Batgirl #58–59	144	October 2005	978-1401204334
Robin: To Kill a Bird	Robin (vol. 2) #134–139	144	April 2006	978-1401209094
Robin: Days of Fire and Madness	Robin (vol. 2) #140–145	144	August 2006	978-1401209117
Robin: Wanted	Robin (vol. 2) #148–153	144	March 2007	978-1401212254
Robin: Teenage Wasteland	Robin (vol. 2) #154–162	208	November 2007	978-1401214807
Robin: The Big Leagues	Robin (vol. 2) #163–167	128	March 2008	978-1401216733
Robin: Violent Tendencies	Robin (vol. 2) #170–174, Robin/Spoiler Special #1	160	December 2008	978-1401219888
Robin: Search for a Hero	Robin (vol. 2) #175–183	208	August 2009	978-1401223106
Tim Drake: Robin Vol. 1	Tim Drake: Robin #1–6	208	September 2023	978-1779520579
Damian Wayne
Robin: Son of Batman Vol. 1: Year of Blood	Robin: Son of Batman #1–6	176	March 29, 2016	978-1401261559
Robin: Son of Batman Vol. 2: Dawn of the Demons	Robin: Son of Batman #7–13	176	September 2016	978-1401264819
Robin Vol. 1: The Lazarus Tournament	Robin (vol. 3) #1–6 and material from Batman (vol. 2) #106, Detective Comics #1034	184	April 2022	978-1779514332
Robin Vol. 2: I Am Robin	Robin (vol. 3) #7–12; Robin 2021 Annual #1	208	September 2022	978-1779516732
Robin Vol. 3: Secrets and Shadows	Robin (vol. 3) #13–17	208	March 2023	978-1779519955
Other
Robin: The Teen Wonder	Batman #428, 442, Batman: Legends of the Dark Knight #100, Nightwing #101, Robin (vol. 2) #126, 132, Teen Titans #29	160	June 2009	978-1401222550
Robin, the Boy Wonder: A Celebration of 75 Years	Detective Comics #38, 156, 342, Batman #20, 107, 408, 428, 442, 657, Star-Spangled Comics #82, 86, 103, Batman Family #1, Nightwing (vol. 2) #25, 101, Robin (vol 2) #46, 126, Superman/Batman #7, 77, Batman and Robin Annual (vol. 2) #1, Justice League of America #55, Batman: The Dark Knight Returns #2, DC One Million 80-Page Giant #1000000	400	May 2015	978-1401255367
Robin: 80 Years of the Boy Wonder The Deluxe Edition	Batman #368, 410–411, 466, Detective Comics #38, 394, 395, 535, 796, Robin #25–26, Batman Chronicles: The Gauntlet #1, World's Finest Comics #141, Star Spangled Comics #65,124, Teen Titans #14, Batman and Robin #0, Batman Incorporated #1, Super Sons #5	416	September 2020	978-1779507211
Robin War	Robin War #1–2, Robin: Son of Batman #7, Grayson #15, Detective Comics (vol. 2) #47, We Are Robin #7, Gotham Academy #13, Red Hood/Arsenal #7, Teen Titans #15.	256	April 2016	978-1401262082
We Are Robin Vol. 1: The Vigilante Business	We Are Robin #1–6, DC Sneak Peek: We Are Robin #1	160	April 2016	978-1401259822
We Are Robin Vol. 2: Jokers	We Are Robin #7–13	152	October 2016	978-1401264901
Robins Being Robin	Robins #1–6	144	September 2022	978-1779516688

== See also ==
- Homosexuality in the Batman franchise
- List of exclamations by Robin
