= Killowat =

Publication information
- Publisher: DC Comics
- First appearance: Team Titans #1 (September 1992)
- Created by: Dan Jurgens

In-story information
- Alter ego: Charlie Watkins
- Species: Metahuman
- Team affiliations: Teen Titans
- Abilities: Electric based powers; Flight

Killowat (Charlie Watkins) is a character appearing in American comic books published by DC Comics, primarily in association with the Team Titans. Originally a corporal serving the tyrant Lord Chaos, Killowat joined the Team Titans after learning of Chaos' evil intentions. In the storyline Zero Hour: Crisis in Time!, Killowat and the Team Titans are revealed to have been sleeper agents working for Monarch. Most of the Titans are erased from existence after their timeline is destroyed and have not appeared since.

== Publication history ==
Killowat first appeared in Team Titans #1, and was created by Dan Jurgens.

== Fictional character biography ==
Charlie Watkins originates from an alternate timeline ten years in the future, where Lord Chaos reigns and a force known as the Team Titans struggle to overthrow his tyranny. Watkins is originally a member of Lord Chaos' Force Elite who attains the rank of corporal. While serving in the Force Elite, Watkins learns of Chaos' true nature and offers to become a double agent for the Team Titans. On a routine mission, Watkins is exposed as a spy and falls into an energy convertor, which gives him electric superpowers.

Exposed as a traitor to Lord Chaos, Killowat offers to become a member of the Team Titans and is accepted. Shortly thereafter, the Titans travel ten years into the past to stop Chaos from being born. To accomplish this, the Titans are assigned to kill Donna Troy before she can give birth to the child who will become Chaos. Instead, the Titans convince Donna to give up her powers, ensuring that Chaos will not inherit them. The Titans are stranded in the past, unable to return to their future.

During the Zero Hour: Crisis in Time! event, it is revealed that the Team Titans are sleeper agents working for Monarch, who was aware of the impending time crisis and wanted a super-powered army at his command. Monarch, now known as Extant, commands the Team Titans to attack the heroes who are trying to unravel the crisis. During the battle, Killowat and most of the Team Titans are killed after their timeline is erased from existence. Terra, Deathwing, and Mirage survive, having originated from the main timeline rather than the future.

== Other versions ==
An alternate universe version of Killowat appears in Team Titans Annual #2. This version is the protector of an alien refugee camp.

== In other media ==
- Killowat makes non-speaking appearances in Teen Titans as an honorary member of the eponymous group.
- The Teen Titans animated series incarnation of Killowat appears in the tie-in comic Teen Titans Go!, in which it is revealed that he originates from an alternate universe and was a member of Team Titans before Raven transported him to the main universe to save his life. He subsequently joins the Teen Titans until Raven returns him to his universe.
- Kilowatt appears as a character summon in Scribblenauts Unmasked: A DC Comics Adventure.
