= Battalion (DC Comics) =

- Battalion as depicted in Team Titans #3 (November 1992). Art by Kevin Maguire.

Publication information
- Publisher: DC Comics
- First appearance: Team Titans #2 (November 1992)
- Created by: Marv Wolfman (writer); Kevin Maguire (artist)

In-story information
- Alter ego: Alexander Lyons
- Team affiliations: Team Titans
- Abilities: Uses weapons, enhanced strength and durability

Battalion (Alexander Lyons) is a fictional character in the DC Comics universe. He first appeared in Team Titans #2 (November 1992), and was created by writer Marv Wolfman and artist Kevin Maguire.

== Fictional character biography ==
Alexander Lyons aka Battalion, dubbed the "Drill Sergeant from Hell", is a member of the Team Titans, an alternate version of the Teen Titans from ten years in the future, where Lord Chaos reigns. In this future, Lyons had been a concert pianist. When he continued to perform after Lord Chaos banned all music, Lyons was punished by being forced to watch while Chaos killed his wife Essie and their children.

Battalion joins the Titans in traveling 10 years into the past to stop Chaos from being born. To accomplish this, the Titans are assigned to kill Donna Troy before she can give birth to the child who would become Lord Chaos. Instead, the Titans convince Donna to give up her powers, ensuring that Chaos will not inherit them. The Titans are stranded in the past, unable to return to their future.

Battalion and the Team Titans, with no place to go, end up staying at a farm owned by Donna Troy. They attempt to find counterparts of themselves in the present, and Battalion is pleased to find Deathwing, an alternate form of the current-day hero Nightwing. They partner up for 'busting heads'. Battalion also discovers that his dead wife Essie is alive, but engaged to another man.

Battalion begins to pursue a relationship with Donna Troy just prior to the Zero Hour: Crisis in Time! event, which reveals that the villain Extant created the Team Titans to serve him. Extant commands the Titans to attack the heroes who are trying to unravel the crisis. The Titans' future is erased from existence, which kills them as well.

== Powers and abilities ==
Battalion is a metahuman with enhanced speed, strength and durability. He is additionally a skilled combatant and wields firearms.

== Other versions ==
- Battalion appears in Teen Titans Go! #48.
- An Elseworlds version used to be a priest on the peaceful planet Ion. When his people were ravaged by Lord Chaos, he took up guns to protect them.
