= Team Titans =

Comic book published by DC Comics

- One of five alternative covers for Team Titans #1 (September 1992). Art by Kevin Maguire and Will Blyberg.

Publication information
- Publisher: DC Comics
- Schedule: Monthly
- Format: Maxi-series to Teen Titans
- Publication date: September 1992 – September 1994
- No. of issues: 24 + 2 Annuals
- Main character(s): Mirage; Terra; Redwing; Nightrider (Dagon); Killowat; Prester Jon; Battalion

Creative team
- Created by: Marv Wolfman; Tom Grummett
- Written by: Various
- Artist: Various

Team Titans is a comic book published by DC Comics that spun out of DC's New Titans series. It began in September 1992 and ended in September 1994. The Team Titans were first introduced as a shadowy group stalking the Titans. Their backstory was revealed in New Titans Annual #7 by writer Marv Wolfman, and were popular enough to merit their own series, which Wolfman also wrote. Phil Jimenez and Jeff Jensen took over writing duties with issue #13, and co-wrote the book until its cancellation.

== Publication history ==
While Wolfman was initially given the title indefinitely, he chose to leave the title to devote more time to New Titans and Deathstroke. Creative differences between the new writing staff and editorial, combined with low sales, led to the book's cancellation in the Zero Hour: Crisis in Time! crossover event, where most of the Titans are killed when the timeline collapses.

The unfortunate part of that was we had no idea that what they wanted was DC Comics' X-Force. They, DC management at the time, saw Team Titans as this answer to Rob Liefeld's X-Force, and what we wanted to do was something much more character-driven [and] self-aware, something more like Grant Morrison's Doom Patrol. So from literally the first issue, it was a struggle editorially to the point that the book just fell apart on us completely, and a long-term story that we had planned got condensed to four issues. Then Zero Hour came along and undermined everything anyway.

== Story ==
One of several Team Titans teams from the future, they function as a rebellion against the dictator Lord Chaos, the son of Donna Troy. The Titans travel back in time to prevent Chaos' birth, but instead convince Donna to give up her powers, ensuring that Chaos will be born, but lack powers as well. However, the Titans are trapped in the past and unable to return to the future. Their alternate-future Nightwing comes back in time and briefly joins the team. This version of Nightwing, attacked and corrupted by a dark version of Raven shortly after his arrival, changes his name to Deathwing and becomes Raven's assistant.

During the Zero Hour: Crisis in Time! event, Killowat, Redwing, Nightrider, Prester Jon, and Battalion are revealed to originate from a false timeline created by Monarch, who intended them to act as sleeper agents for him during the time crisis. When Monarch is defeated, the timelines he created are destroyed, causing the heroes from those futures to be erased from existence. Mirage, Terra, and Deathwing survive. It is later established that they are from the real timeline and not the false one, and that they had been transported back through time and given false memories by the Time Trapper who planned to use them as sleeper agents against Extant.

== See also ==
- Teen Titans (disambiguation)
