= Mirage (DC Comics) =

Mirage is the name of two fictional characters appearing in American comic books published by DC Comics. The first was a minor villain of Batman. The second is a heroine affiliated with the Teen Titans.

== Fictional character biography ==
=== Mike ===
Mirage
- Mirage as depicted in Detective Comics #511 (February 1982). Art by Rich Buckler (penciller) and Dick Giordano (inker).

Publication information
- Publisher: DC Comics
- First appearance: Detective Comics #511 (February 1982)
- Created by: Gerry Conway (writer); Don Newton (artist)

In-story information
- Alter ego: Mike
- Species: Human
- Abilities: Illusion generation

The first Mirage was a man named Mike (also referred to as "Kerry Austin") and appeared in Detective Comics #511 (February 1982). He uses a gem that causes people to see elaborate illusions. He commits crimes while his victims are occupied fighting against these illusions. This crime wave brings him to the attention of Batman. Batman faces Mirage several times before coming up with a strategy to beat him. During the encounter, Mirage's gem is destroyed. Batman is able to defeat him and send him to jail. While in jail, Mirage creates contact lenses from fragments of his jewel.

In the series 52, Mirage is killed by Bruno Mannheim. Mannheim orders his minion Lazlo to prepare Mirage's body for consumption, revealing himself to be a cannibal.

=== Miriam Delgado ===
Mirage
- Mirage as depicted in Team Titans #21 (June 1994). Art by Terry Dodson.

Publication information
- Publisher: DC Comics
- First appearance: The New Titans #79 (1991)
- Created by: Marv Wolfman

In-story information
- Alter ego: Miriam Delgado
- Team affiliations: Team Titans; New Titans
- Abilities: Able to project illusions, and use a wall of illusion to alter her appearance.

The second Mirage, Miriam Delgado, is a member of the Team Titans and part of a resistance against the dictator Lord Chaos. After Donna Troy, Chaos' mother, sacrifices her powers to prevent her son from inheriting them, Mirage and the Titans relocate to Donna's farm in New Jersey. Mirage deals with Killowat's intense crush on her and the more malicious intents of another man. Mirage is raped by her former lover Deathwing and becomes pregnant with his child. She uses her powers to deceive her friends, making it appear as though she had had a miscarriage.

In the storyline Zero Hour: Crisis in Time!, Mirage learns that she was a runaway street urchin from Brazil who was kidnapped by the Time Trapper and implanted with false memories. Mirage remains a member of Arsenal's Titans team. During this time, her powers fluctuate and she creates illusions uncontrollably. Eventually, Mirage gives birth to a daughter named Julienne and leaves the Titans to spend time with her.

Mirage rejoins the Titans for a brief period during One Year Later.

== Powers and abilities ==
Both incarnations of Mirage can generate illusions. The Mike incarnation's abilities are derived from a special gem, while the Miriam Delgado incarnation is a metahuman who possesses innate abilities.

== In other media ==
- An original incarnation of Mirage named Miranda appears in the Static Shock episode "Brother-Sister Act", voiced by Gavin Turek. This version is a Bang Baby who, alongside her brother Byron, is exposed to mutagen amidst a clean-up effort following the Big Bang, with Miranda acquiring photokinesis that allows her to create illusions. Realizing that the mutagen has affected Bryon's mind, Miranda helps Static defeat him. Miranda is taken by child protective services and creates an illusion to protect Static's secret identity from his sister Sharon.
- The Miriam Delgado incarnation of Mirage appears as a character summon in Scribblenauts Unmasked: A DC Comics Adventure.
- An unidentified, alternate universe version of Mirage appears in Teen Titans Go! #48 as a member of the Teen Titans. In addition, the Miriam Delgado version of Mirage appears in issue #55 as a member of Titans North.

== See also ==
- List of Batman family enemies
