= Aqualad (disambiguation) =

Aqualad is a character appearing in DC comicics.

Aqualad may also refer to:

- Aqualad (Jackson Hyde)
- "Aqualad" (Titans episode)
- Aqualad (Titans character)
