= Topo (DC Comics) =

Publication information
- Publisher: DC Comics
- First appearance: Adventure Comics #229 (October 1956)
- Created by: Ramona Fradon

In-story information
- Species: Pre-Crisis; Sentient octopus Post-Crisis; Anthropomorphic squid New 52; Sea monster
- Team affiliations: Atlantis
- Partnerships: Aquaman

Topo is the name of several characters appearing in American comic books published by DC Comics, notable as a loyal sidekick to Aquaman.

== Publication history ==
Topo first appeared in Adventure Comics #229 (October 1956), and was created by Ramona Fradon.

As of current continuity, there have been three different versions of the character. The first version is an intelligent octopus who is usually seen babysitting Aquababy in pre-Crisis continuity. The second is an anthropomorphic octopus and an ally of the second Aquaman. The third is a monstrous octopus-crab hybrid who Aquaman can summon using a special conch.

== Fictional character history ==
=== Sentient octopus version ===
The original Topo was born in or near the undersea continent of Atlantis, where he became a favored pet of Aquaman. The creature appears to be gifted with an exceptional intelligence compared to that of an average octopus, and possesses superior dexterity and problem solving skills as well. Topo once demonstrated his skill with a bow and arrow, and was even known to have developed a keen ear for music; supposedly he was able to play several musical instruments simultaneously.

=== Humanoid octopus version ===
The second incarnation of Topo appears in Aquaman: Sword of Atlantis, as part of the "One Year Later". This version is a humanoid octopus. He aids Mera, Tempest, and Cal Durham in returning to Sub Diego, only to learn that the city has been taken over by Black Manta. When Black Manta orders his goons to attack the group, Topo takes position and squirts ink as a distraction so they can escape.

=== Sea monster version ===
In The New 52, Topo is reintroduced as a sea monster, resembling an octopus-crab hybrid, whom Aquaman can summon with a special conch. Aquaman summons it to deal with the Scavenger, and uses his full telepathic power to unleash the creature on the Scavenger's fleet. However, this version of Topo is found to be too intelligent to be controlled by Aquaman's telepathy; while the creature manages to destroy the enemy submarines, the strain of mentally commanding Topo causes Aquaman to suffer from nosebleeding before becoming unconscious.

== Other versions ==
- An alternate universe variant of Topo appears in Flashpoint Beyond. This version is a member of the Atlantean army whose family was killed by Wonder Woman.
- Topo appears in DC Super Friends, Tiny Titans, and the Scooby-Doo comics.

== In other media ==
- Topo appears in Young Justice, voiced by James Arnold Taylor. This version is a friend of Aqualad and a student of the Conservatory of Sorcery who later becomes prime minister of the Atlantean city-state of Lemuria.
- Topo (Tactical Observation and Pursuit Operative) appears in the DC Extended Universe films Aquaman and Aquaman and the Lost Kingdom. This version is genetically engineered to possess enhanced intelligence and is skilled in espionage.
