= Aquagirl =

DC Comics character

- Tula Marius as depicted in The New 52

Publication information
- Publisher: DC Comics
- First appearance: Aquaman vol. 1 #33 (May 1967)
- Created by: Bob Haney; Nick Cardy

In-story information
- Alter ego: Tula Marius
- Species: Atlantean
- Place of origin: Atlantis
- Team affiliations: Teen Titans; Aquaman Family; Atlantean Royal Family; The Drift
- Partnerships: Aquaman; Ocean Master; Tempest
- Supporting character of: Aquaman
- Abilities: List: Atlantean physiology grants the following: Superhuman strength; Superhuman durability; Superhman speed; Underwater breathing; Enhanced swimming speeds; Skilled hand-to-hand combatant and proficiency in weaponry.; Highly-trained black-ops specialist and skilled in espionage.; Skilled in politics

Aquagirl (also Aqua-Girl) is the codename used by several superheroes appearing in American comic books published by DC Comics, depicted as female counterparts and allies to the superhero Aquaman. The first two versions were introduced as one-off characters in Adventure Comics #266 (November 1959) and World's Finest Comics #133 (May 1963).

However, the most well-regarded version is introduced as Tula, first an orphan adopted into one of the royal families of Atlantis who becomes one of Aquaman's junior sidekicks and a member of the Teen Titans until her death in Crisis on Infinite Earths. Following The New 52, the character is re-introduced as Tula Marius, the half-sister of Ocean Master (through their shared father) and a high-ranking government official in the Atlantean government, chiefly as commander of the covert black-ops and secret police, the Drift. The principal love interest of Garth (the original Aqualad), the character's depiction has led to some critical analysis on the portrayal of women in comic books. Another prominent version is Lorena Marquez, introduced in Aquaman vol. 6 #16 (May 2004). This version of the character is a human who acquires powers after being exposed to a serum derived from Aquaman's DNA, she assumes the role of Aquagirl and is partnered with both Aquaman and the Teen Titans.

Several incarnations of Aquagirl have appeared in media, including the Tula incarnation in the animated series Young Justice and 2013 animated film Justice League: The Flashpoint Paradox, although she is not identified as her codename in either. Original incarnations of the character also appear, such as Mareena, the future daughter of Aquaman and Mera, who appears in the DC Animated Universe.

== Publication history ==
The Tula version of the character was introduced in Aquaman vol. 1 #33 (May–June 1967), created by Bob Haney and Nick Cardy.

== Fictional character history ==
Aquagirl (Tula, left) in her first appearance on the cover of Aquaman vol. 1 #33 (May 1967). Art by Nick Cardy.

After losing her parents soon after her birth, Tula was found and adopted by one of the royal families of Atlantis. Given the title Princess of Poseidonis, Tula is schooled in Atlantean traditions and never leaves the royal palace until she meets Aqualad (Garth) at age fifteen. Tula sometimes helps Aqualad with missions during his time with the original Teen Titans, using the name Aquagirl. During Crisis on Infinite Earths (1985), Aquagirl is killed by the villain Chemo when she drowns in water that he has poisoned.

In the 1996–1997 miniseries Tempest, a woman claiming to be Tula enters Garth's life. In truth, it is a doppelgänger created by the villainous Slizzath as part of a plan to siphon Garth's mystical energy for his purposes. Garth sees through the ruse, is able to defeat Slizzath and finally gain a sense of closure about Tula's death. It is also at this time that Garth adopts a new identity as "Tempest". Aquagirl is brought back to life by Brother Blood—along with Hawk and Dove, Phantasm, and Kole—to combat the Titans. After being freed by Beast Boy and Raven, Kid Eternity is able to lay the deceased Titans back to rest.

In the Blackest Night miniseries (2009–2010), Tula, Aquaman and Dolphin appear as a group of reanimated Black Lanterns who attack Tempest and Mera. Tula tears out Tempest's heart, killing him and bringing about his reanimation as a Black Lantern. Tula later appears to battle the Titans, but is destroyed by Dawn Granger.

In September 2011, DC Comics relaunched of all of its monthly titles with its New 52 initiative, rebooting the DC Universe continuity. Tula is reimagined as the half-sister of Ocean Master (Orm Marius) via her father, Orvax Marius. Additionally, Tula is a former member of the Drift, an elite special faction in the Atlantean army.

== Powers and abilities ==
Tula possess the typical abilities of an Atlantean; able to breathe underwater, possessed a level of superhuman strength, durability, and senses that enabled her to withstand the intense pressures of the ocean. She also possessed telepathic powers and was skilled in hand-to-hand combatant. Post-Flashpoint, she is considered an adept warrior skilled with Atlantean weaponry. A special forces commander, her skills includes espionage, military tactics, and is a proficient trainer. Her proficiency and leadership has allowed her to also act as a regent.

== Other versions ==
=== One-off Aquagirls ===
Both Lisa Morel and Selena served as the first characters to utilize the Aquagirl moniker although they were one-off characters; the former introduced in Adventure Comics #266 (November 1959), she is among the several violet-eyed children from Atlantis born unable to adapt underwater and were sent to live among humans. She was adopted by scientist Hugo Morel and his wife With Aquaman in danger, Lisa's water-breathing and telepathic powers awaken; she makes herself a costume identical to Aquaman's, takes on the name "Aquagirl" and fights alongside him. However, her new-found powers are short-lived, and she loses them permanently. Selena is instead a teen from Poseidonis who temporarily teams up with Aquaman under the name "Aqua-Girl" in World's Finest Comics #133 (May 1963) to make her former boyfriend jealous. She succeeds, even making Aqualad jealous.

=== Lorena Marquez ===
- First appearance: Aquaman (2003) #16 (March 2004)
- Created by: Will Pfeifer; Patrick Gleason
- Species: Metahuman
- Teams: Teen Titans; Aquaman Family
- Abilities: Biological adaption allowed for underwather breath, superhuman strength, durability, and enhanced swim speeds. Skilled hand-to-hand combatant and keen investigative abilities.

Lorena Marqueza as Aquagirl.

Lorena Marquez is a superheroine appearing in American comic books published by DC Comics. First appearing in Aquaman (2003) #16, she was created by Will Pfeifer and Patrick Gleason. Unlike other versions of Aquagirl, the character is not Atlantean but instead a metahuman who gained powers similar to Atlanteans and is of Latina origin.

A native of San Diego, Lorena is injured alongside her family by an earthquake. While nursed back to health, Lorena learns that she is able to breathe underwater. It is revealed that amoral scientist Anton Giest had secretly experimented on the citizens of San Diego by tainting their water supply with Aquaman's DNA with the intent to turn them into ocean-dwellers. With little choice, Aquaman and Lorena rebuild the city as "Sub Diego". Later, Ocean Master unleashes a plot to usurp Aquaman's life with time magic and Lorena is made his "Aquagirl" and given a costume. While foiled, Lorena keeps the costume and identity, resuming heroics as she helps solves a string of homicides.

Later a member of the Teen Titans for a time, she helps Steel in launching an attack on LexCorp when Natasha Irons is captured by Lex Luthor. She is later kidnapped (along with a group of other teen superheroes) by the Terror Titans. While her teammate Molecule is killed by Persuader, Lorena is taken alive, to be mindwiped and forced to fight in the Dark Side Club at the behest of the Apokoliptan gods on Earth. She is defeated twice, once by Rose Wilson after being stabbed, and again by a brainwashed Terra, who crushes Lorena with a pair of boulders. Aquagirl and the others are eventually freed by Miss Martian, and Lorena joins the survivors in a trek to Titans Tower to recover. While resting in the tower, Lorena meets and befriends Static, telling him that she enjoyed her past experience as a member of the Teen Titans. With little else to go in light of Arthur and her family's demise, Lorena accepts Wonder Girl's offer to rejoin the team, taking up permanent residence in Titans Tower. With a close friendship with Static, she also flirts with Blue Beetle (Jaime Reyes) despite dating Traci Thirteen, Superboy, and has an enmity with Bombshell. During a mission to rescue Raven from an extradimensional being called Wyld, Aquagirl and Bombshell are swallowed by a sea monster mutated by Wyld's energy. After Static destroys Wyld, Aquagirl and Bombshell are sidelined by Wonder Girl due to concerns regarding inexperienced team heroes in their ranks.

In Brightest Day, Lorena is approached by Mera who had come searching for help against her sister and her Death Squad. She and Mera subsequently reappear when Siren and her army attack Miami as the opening salvo of an invasion. During the battle, Lorena rescues Aqualad by kicking Black Manta in the face just as he is about to stab Aqualad to death. After Mera and Aqualad successfully trap the invaders inside the Bermuda Triangle, Lorena tells Aqualad not to "get any ideas" as the two teens watch Aquaman and Mera kiss.

=== Alternate universe versions ===
- In Kingdom Come, Aquagirl is Tula II, the estranged teenage daughter of Garth (formerly Aqualad, now Aquaman). She is named after her father's late girlfriend and is part of a team consisting of the other original Titans' children who end up taking Batman's side in the story's key conflict. In her appearances, Tula demonstrates shapeshifting abilities, changing parts of her body to resemble those of sea creatures.
- In "Titans Tomorrow", an alternate timeline story featured in Teen Titans vol. 3 #17–19 (2005) by writer Geoff Johns and artist Mike McKone, Lorena is Aquawoman, a member of a future, alternate version of the Titans. She has developed telepathic powers, which she used to kill (or paralyze) former Titan member Garth.

== In other media ==
Mareena as she appears in Batman Beyond (left) and Justice League Unlimited (right).

- An original, futuristic incarnation of Aquagirl named Mareena appears in series set in the DC Animated Universe, voiced by Jodi Benson. This version is a member of a future Justice League and daughter of Aquaman and Mera who possesses hydrokinesis. Introduced in the Batman Beyond episode "The Call", Mareena later makes a non-speaking appearance in the Justice League Unlimited episode "Epilogue".
- Tula appears in Young Justice, voiced by Cree Summer. This version is Kaldur'ahm's childhood friend who entered a relationship with his best friend Garth after the former left Atlantis to become Aquaman's sidekick and was trained by Mera in aquamancy. In between the first and second seasons, as depicted in Young Justice: Legacy (see below), Tula joined the team, but died while on a mission.
- Aquagirl will appear in Super Powers.
- An alternate timeline version of Tula appears in Justice League: The Flashpoint Paradox as a member of Aquaman's army who is killed in battle against Wonder Woman's Amazons.
- The Young Justice incarnation of Tula / Aquagirl appears in Young Justice: Legacy, voiced again by Cree Summer. She serves as the Team's mission coordinator until she is killed in battle with Tiamat.
