= Young Justice: Legacy =

2013 video game

- Developer: Freedom Factory Studios
- Publishers: Little Orbit; Warner Bros. Interactive Entertainment
- Writers: Greg Weisman; Brandon Vietti; Sharon Scott
- Platforms: Nintendo 3DS, PlayStation 3, Xbox 360, Microsoft Windows
- Release: NA: November 19, 2013; EU: November 22, 2013; AU: November 21, 2013
- Genres: Action-adventure, action role-playing
- Modes: Single-player, multiplayer

Young Justice: Legacy is an action-adventure video game developed by Freedom Factory Studios and published by Little Orbit. It was released in November 2013 for Nintendo 3DS, Microsoft Windows, PlayStation 3, and Xbox 360. The game is based on the Young Justice animated television series, and takes place in the four-year gap between seasons one and two. It was developed in collaboration with series writers Greg Weisman and Brandon Vietti. Originally, the game was planned to be released on the Nintendo DS, Wii, and Wii U as well, but these versions were cancelled due to quality issues and low interest from retailers.

The game is an action role-playing game in which the player creates a squad of heroes and plays as multiple characters alongside Justice League members. Young Justice: Legacy features support for single-player and multiplayer modes.

== Gameplay ==
Players can select three members from a roster of twelve Young Justice TV series characters to play in the game's fifteen different levels. They can also switch their control among the three active characters while playing. Each character has a unique set of special abilities to use on the battlefield as well as certain strengths and weaknesses that define that character's role during battle. Characters and their abilities level up as they progress through missions. Every character also has at least three costumes that change both the character's appearance and how they play. Also, the player can buy equipment from Red Tornado and train with Black Canary. Certain missions have the player fighting with the assistance of Justice League members, such as Superman, Green Lantern, Aquaman, and Batman. The game also features several unlockable modes in which players are presented with certain tasks to accomplish.

== Characters ==
Young Justice: Legacy features twelve playable characters; four downloadable characters; twelve villains, including one villain who is exclusive to the video game; and several non-playable characters.

Playable characters
Nightwing; Aqualad; Artemis; Kid Flash	Robin; Miss Martian; Superboy; Tempest	Zatanna; Beast Boy; Rocket; Batgirl	Wonder Girl^{a}; Bumblebee^{a}; Lagoon Boy^{a}; Blue Beetle^{a}
Villains
Bane; Black Manta; Blockbuster; Cheshire	Icicle Jr.; Killer Frost; Klarion; Lex Luthor	Psimon; Riddler; Sportsmaster; Tiamat	
Non-playable characters
Aquaman; Aquagirl; Batman; Black Canary	Helena Sandsmark; Green Lantern; Red Tornado; Superman		

^a Downloadable content

== Development ==
Young Justice: Legacy was originally scheduled to be released in February 2013, on the Nintendo DS, Microsoft Windows, PlayStation 3, Wii, and Xbox 360. The game would also feature the original lineup of characters from the first season, but after the premiere of the second season, the lineup was changed. The game was delayed, eventually to September and then to November 2013, for Nintendo 3DS, Microsoft Windows, PlayStation 3, Wii U, and Xbox 360, with no mention in the delay announcements of either a Nintendo DS or a Wii version.

Many of the initial delays resulted from production uncertainty. In its pre-production phase throughout late 2011 into late 2012, the development of the game shifted between Little Orbit's in-house development branch (Game Machine), their contractor in Madrid (Freedom Factory), and a satellite studio in Melbourne (Game Machine). Once initial quality issues and developer responsibilities settled, the game was completed.

On April 3, 2013, Namco Bandai Games announced that they had partnered with Little Orbit to distribute Young Justice: Legacy in Europe and the Middle East.

On August 3, 2013, it was announced on the game's official Facebook page that the game would be delayed for the Windows and all Nintendo platforms until November 2013, while the game would be released as scheduled for the Wii console. The announcement said that the Nintendo versions of the game would "have the same story from Brandon and Greg and will be using the same art, but will have their own combat style to take advantage of their unique controls", while noting that "development is running a little behind, so the official release date has been pushed back to November."

On October 27, 2013, it was announced that due to several factors ranging from quality issues to lack of retailer support, Little Orbit had to cancel the Wii and Wii U versions. The Xbox 360, PS3, 3DS, and Windows versions were released as planned.

== Reception ==
The game received negative reviews.

IGN gave it 4.8, concluding, "Young Justice: Legacy is a listless squad-based action RPG that squanders its heroic potential."
