= Lagoon Boy =

- Lagoon Boy (bottom right), alongside the Titans East, as depicted in Titans East Special #1 (January 2008). Art by Ian Churchill.

Publication information
- Publisher: DC Comics
- First appearance: Aquaman (vol. 5) #50 (December 1998)
- Created by: Erik Larsen; Eric Battle

In-story information
- Team affiliations: Titans East; Young Justice
- Abilities: Superhuman strength, durability, and speed; Underwater breathing; Sharp claws and teeth; Inflation; Psionic control over sea creatures; telepathic and empathic; Hydrokinesis

Lagoon Boy is a fictional superhero published by DC Comics. His name and appearance are references to the title character from the classic horror feature film Creature from the Black Lagoon.

Lagoon Boy has made limited appearances in media outside comics, with Yuri Lowenthal voicing him in Young Justice.

== Publication history ==
Lagoon Boy first appeared in Aquaman vol. 5 #50 (December 1998), and was created by Erik Larsen.

== Fictional character biography ==
In Lagoon Boy's first appearance, he is allowed into Atlantis as part of an attempt by Aquaman to make Atlantis more open to those living outside the city by granting them citizenship. His presence is met with protests by elitist Atlanteans. Lagoon Boy comes to the citizenship ceremony on the day of Aquaman and Mera's marriage. While there, he befriends Blubber, an anthropomorphic whale, and his mermaid assistant Sheeva. The three begin calling themselves the "Land-Lovers" as they are fascinated with the surface world. Blubber creates a device which allows Atlanteans to view television from the surface world, and the trio head up to the surface world to explore and compare it to the television broadcasts they had seen. Their appearance creates a huge disturbance and the Coast Guard is quickly called. Aquaman rescues the Land-Lovers from persecution and returns them to Atlantis.

After Erik Larsen's run on Aquaman ended, the Land-Lovers did not reappear in the title. Lagoon Boy appears during the "Batman: No Man's Land" storyline, where he, Superboy, Robin, and Impulse battle Kobra. Lagoon Boy reappears in the Sins of Youth storyline, where he is aged to adulthood. He helps Young Justice against Klarion the Witch Boy and Black Manta, and he assists the JSA, JLA and the Titans in ending the mixture of science and magic which caused the transformations.

Lagoon Boy later displays the ability to command, or at least enlist the aid of, humpback whales to cause a riptide on the shores of Zandia. Robin and Lagoon Boy team up to stop a sea monster from damaging Gotham Harbor and force its return to the sea.

Over a year after Young Justice disbands, Lagoon Boy is recruited into Titans East. However, he is rendered comatose after he and the rest of the Titans are attacked by Trigon's children.

In The New 52 continuity reboot, Lagoon Boy appears as a member of the Teen Titans five years in the future.

During the "Heroes in Crisis" storyline, Lagoon Boy is seen at the Sanctuary rehabilitation center before being killed by a mysterious assailant. He is later revealed to have survived, with the Lagoon Boy who was killed being a clone created by Gold Beetle.

== Powers and abilities ==
Lagoon Boy is an Atlantean who is amphibious, allowing him to survive underwater and on land. He possesses increased strength, durability, and speed, and can inflate like a pufferfish, generating spikes across his body. Similar to Aquaman, Lagoon Boy can manipulate water and communicate with sea life.

== Other versions ==
An alternate universe version of Lagoon Boy appears in Teen Titans: Earth One.

== In other media ==
=== Television ===
Lagoon Boy, also known as La'gaan, appears in Young Justice, voiced by Yuri Lowenthal. This version is a student at the Conservatory of Sorcery and a member of the Team who displays a cocky, arrogant, and thrill-seeking personality. Additionally, he is the estranged friend of Kaldur'ahm and the boyfriend of Miss Martian who displays a romantic rivalry with her ex-boyfriend Superboy. Near the end of the second season, Miss Martian rekindles her relationship with Superboy and eventually breaks up with Lagoon Boy. As of the third season, Lagoon Boy has left the Team, returned to Atlantis, and joined the royal guard. In the fourth season, he is revealed to be bisexual, in a three-way polyamorous marriage, and raising a baby. Later in the season, Lagoon Boy joins the Justice League as the third Aquaman, sharing the mantle alongside Kaldur'ahm and Orin.

=== Video games ===
- Lagoon Boy appears in Young Justice: Legacy, voiced again by Yuri Lowenthal.
- Lagoon Boy appears as a character summon in Scribblenauts Unmasked: A DC Comics Adventure.

=== Miscellaneous ===
- Lagoon Boy appears in Teen Titans Go! #52 as an alternate alias of Robby Reed after his H-Dial borrows Aqualad's powers.
- Lagoon Boy appears in issue #14 of the Young Justice tie-in comic.
