= Aqualad =

Names of two fictional characters in DC Comics

Publication information
- Publisher: DC Comics
- First appearance: Garth: Adventure Comics #269 (February 1960); Jackson Hyde: Brightest Day #4 (August 2010)
- Created by: Garth: Robert Bernstein; Ramona Fradon; Jackson Hyde: Brandon Vietti; Greg Weisman; Phil Bourassa

In-story information
- Alter ego: Garth; Jackson Hyde
- Species: Atlantean
- Team affiliations: Teen Titans; Young Justice; Aquaman Family
- Notable aliases: Son of the Seven Seas

Aqualad is the alias of two superheroes in American comic books published by DC Comics and appearing in media published by DC Entertainment. The character was originally created by writer Robert Bernstein and artist Ramona Fradon, serving as the sidekick and junior counterpart to superhero Aquaman alongside contemporary, Aquagirl. The character's first incarnation, Garth, debuted in Adventure Comics #269. A native Atlantean unlike his mentor, Garth in both continuities has purple eyes signifying a heritage considered evil and was an outcast taken in by Aquaman. He eventually abandons the "Aqualad" role and adopts the alias, "Tempest".

The second incarnation of the character, Kaldur'ahm, originally was set to debut in 2010, created for the Young Justice animated television series by Brandon Vietti, Greg Weisman, and Phil Bourassa. Several months before the series' premiere, an altered version of the character, Jackson Hyde, was brought into comic books by writer Geoff Johns and artist Ivan Reis. Both versions of the character, sharing the common quality of Aquaman's half-human heritage, are protege of Aquaman whose human heritage originates from their father, Aquaman villain Black Manta. While sharing similar designs, both versions of the character possess different backgrounds and inherent abilities.

The Garth version of Aqualad made his live-action debut in the television series Titans, played by Drew Van Acker.

== Fictional character biography ==
=== Garth ===
Years ago, King Thar and his wife Queen Berra became the reigning monarchs of Shayeris, the capital of a group of Idyllist colonies in the Hidden Valley. Radical Idyllists deposed and murdered King Thar and banished his pregnant wife Queen Berra to Poseidonis, the capital city of Atlantis; there she gave birth to Garth, a child with purple eyes. Superstitious Atlanteans claimed that Garth had been born genetically inferior due to his purple eyes and banished him to a barren seabed leagues away from Atlantis. He survived and later befriended Aquaman, the sometimes outcast King of Atlantis. He was a founding member of the Teen Titans, and later became known as Tempest.

=== Jackson Hyde ===
The new Aqualad, Jackson Hyde, first appeared in Brightest Day #10 (September 2010) which coincided with the appearance of another Aqualad in the Young Justice animated series (albeit using the name Kaldur'ahm). Jackson is a black teenager from New Mexico who, in a teaser poster for the Brightest Day event, was shown using "hard water" abilities to create a sword which was an ability that had previously been thought to belong exclusively to Aquaman's wife, Mera, and people from her world.

== In other media ==
=== Television ===
- The Garth incarnation of Aqualad appears in The Superman/Aquaman Hour of Adventure, voiced by Jerry Dexter.
- The Garth incarnation of Aqualad appears in Teen Titans, voiced by Wil Wheaton.
- The Garth incarnation of Aqualad appears in Batman: The Brave and the Bold, voiced by Zack Shada as a teenager and Zachary Gordon as a child.
- The Kaldur'ahm and Garth incarnations of Aqualad appear in Young Justice, voiced by Khary Payton and Yuri Lowenthal respectively.
- The Garth and Kaldur'ahm incarnations of Aqualad appear in Teen Titans Go!, voiced again by Wil Wheaton and Khary Payton.
- The Garth incarnation of Aqualad appears in Titans, portrayed by Drew Van Acker.
- The Garth incarnation of Aqualad appears in DC Super Hero Girls, voiced by Jessica McKenna.
- An Aqualad live-action series for HBO Max starring Jake Hyde is development, with Charlize Theron, A.J. Dix, Beth Kono and Andrew Haas of Denver & Delilah Films serving as executive producers.

=== Film ===
- The Garth incarnation of Aqualad makes a cameo appearance in Teen Titans: Trouble in Tokyo.
- The Garth and Kaldur'ahm incarnations of Aqualad make cameo appearances in Justice League: The Flashpoint Paradox.
- The Garth incarnation of Aqualad makes a cameo appearance in Teen Titans Go! To the Movies.
- The Kaldur'ahm incarnation of Aqualad makes a cameo appearance in Batman and Superman: Battle of the Super Sons.

=== Video games ===
- The Garth incarnation of Aqualad appears in Aquaman: Battle for Atlantis.
- The Garth and Kaldur'ahm incarnations of Aqualad appear in Young Justice: Legacy, voiced again by Yuri Lowenthal and Khary Payton.
- The Kaldur’ahm incarnation of Aqualad appears as a playable character in Lego DC Super-Villains.

=== Miscellaneous ===
- The Garth incarnation of Aqualad appears in the Teen Titans Go! comic.
