= Miss Martian =

Comic book superheroine

- Artwork for the cover of Teen Titans #40 (December 2006). Art by Tony S. Daniel.

Publication information
- Publisher: DC Comics
- First appearance: Teen Titans (vol. 3) #37 (August 2006)
- Created by: Geoff Johns; Tony S. Daniel

In-story information
- Alter ego: M'gann M'orzz
- Species: White Martian
- Place of origin: Mars
- Team affiliations: Teen Titans; Justice League
- Partnerships: Martian Manhunter
- Notable aliases: Megan Morse, Star-Spangled Kid, Martian girl hunter Mogz (Megan); Miss Supermartian
- Abilities: See list: Superhuman strength, speed, agility, reflexes, stamina, durability and endurance; Martian physiology; Regenerative healing factor; Invulnerability; Invisibility and intangibility (density shifting); Shapeshifting; Flight/Levitation; Telekinesis; Empathy; Telepathy; Memory manipulation; Thought projection; Illusion-casting; Telepathic suggestion; Nine senses; Heat vision; Infrared vision; X-ray vision; Electromagnetic spectrum vision; Microscopic vision; Telescopic vision; Elasticity; Martian vision

Miss Martian (M'gann M'orzz; alias Megan Morse) is a superheroine appearing in American comic books published by DC Comics. An extraterrestrial, she is a White Martian who usually appears in stories as a member of the Teen Titans. Created by writer Geoff Johns and artist Tony Daniel, she first appeared in Teen Titans (vol. 3) #37 (2006).

Sharon Leal portrayed the character in the second season of the Arrowverse series Supergirl. Leal returned in two episodes of the third and fifth seasons and returned in the sixth season. Miss Martian was also featured in the animated series Young Justice, voiced by Danica McKellar.

== Publication history ==
Miss Martian was created by Geoff Johns and Tony Daniel and first appeared in Teen Titans (vol. 3) #37 (2006). Miss Martian is named Megan Morse after Megan, the wife of former Marvel Comics editor Ben Morse, who is a friend of Johns. Johns initially created the character when he was told by DC's editorial staff that he could not use Supergirl, who was a member of the Legion of Super-Heroes at the time.

== Fictional character biography ==
Miss Martian is a White Martian known as M'gann M'orzz, who fled to the Vega system to escape the civil war between her people and the Green Martians. Eventually reaching the safety of Earth, she becomes a provisional member of the Teen Titans during the year between the events depicted in "Infinite Crisis" and the "One Year Later" storylines. On Earth, she simplifies her name to "Megan Morse".

Upon meeting J'onn J'onzz, M'gann chooses to suppress her White Martian identity and takes the physical form of a Green Martian. After her feelings were hurt through insensitivity and misunderstanding with her teammates, M'gann left the Titans and began an independent superhero career in Australia. Though the Titans suspected she might have been a traitor, it turned out that her accuser, Bombshell, was the actual traitor. After helping the team defeat Bombshell and proving her loyalty, she was accepted as a full member of the Titans.

Miss Martian of the future, with an apparition of Martian Manhunter. Art by Alé Garza.

The Titans Tomorrow appear with Miss Martian as a member. She has a different look, having embraced her White Martian heritage. Having changed her name to Martian Manhunter, she is killed by her present-day counterpart. As a result of this encounter, the consciousness of her future self has taken refuge in Megan's own mind. An epilogue to the "Titans of Tomorrow: Today!" storyline depicts Miss Martian eight years in the future; she colludes with Lex Luthor and Tim Drake, the Robin of the time and with whom she is having an affair, to clone several deceased Titans, including Superboy and Kid Flash.

Later, however, Megan begins showing signs of being unable to subdue her evil self, such as appearing before the team having white skin as opposed to her usually preferred green skin. She seems as surprised at this as the rest of the team; out of an abundance of concern, she leaves the Titans for an extended period of time. Teen Titans writer Sean McKeever has stated that Megan's departure from the Titans was part of a longer story he was working on and that she would return to the team at a later time.

Miss Martian is briefly seen as part of a resistance cell in Final Crisis #5. She rejoins the Titans in the aftermath of their failed recruitment drive, bringing new members Static and Aquagirl with her. In the same story, Megan hints that she has rid herself of her future counterpart's consciousness.

Along with a number of other former Titans, M'gann returns to assist the team during their final battle against Superboy-Prime and the Legion of Doom. Working together with Solstice, M'gann defeats her old nemesis Sun Girl.

=== The New 52 ===
In September 2011, DC carried out a revision of its superhero comic book line, including its stories and its characters' fictional histories, known as The New 52. In the revised stories, Miss Martian's first appearance is when Red Robin is shown watching a press conference where Lex Luthor shows off photographs of M'gann as part of a presentation about alien life on Earth.

=== DC Rebirth ===
DC made another revision of its superhero comic book line, known as the DC Rebirth. Miss Martian appears in the revised stories. Here, she has been assigned by Martian Manhunter as the Justice League liaison to watch over the Titans. Miss Martian's nature as a White Martian is revealed to the Titans when she is unable to maintain her disguise after being attacked by Beast Boy, who lost control of himself due to the energy of the Source Wall. Batman tells Donna Troy that Martian Manhunter's actual intention to place Miss Martian on the Titans was to protect her true nature and keep her safe.

== Characterization ==
=== Powers and abilities ===
Miss Martian as the Star-Spangled Kid. Art by Joe Bennett.

Miss Martian possesses abilities similar to Martian Manhunter and all other Martians. She has superhuman strength and stamina comparable to that of a Kryptonian. She is invulnerable and has been shown to repel attacks from the likes of Despero. She can enhance this invulnerability by increasing her density. This invulnerability also extends to her being able to survive in the vacuum of space. She also has the ability to shapeshift and she can use this to regenerate herself at a rapid rate. Her shapeshifting can be used at will and in an unlimited application, including adopting a human or monstrous appearance, elongating her limbs, growing to immense size, altering the chemical composition of her body, etc. This also extends to her being able to expand or lengthen her limbs or to create natural body weapons. This control over her molecular structure also gives her the abilities of invisibility and intangibility.

She is a powerful psychic with major applications of this being telepathy and telekinesis. She can use the telekinesis to manipulate, move, control, levitate many objects. She can also use her telekinesis to fly. Her telepathy is one of her strongest abilities and allows her a wide variety of abilities including mind reading, mental communication, projecting her thoughts, creating illusions, locating other sentient beings, mental detection, mental cloaking, mental scanning, controlling others' minds, manipulating memory, inducing sleep, astral travel, and transferring information to people directly. Her psionic abilities can also manifest themselves in a telekinetic blast/push or a telekinetic shield. A further application of her powers is Martian vision, in which she expels energy from her eyes. Martians have nine senses compared to humans, which gives them stronger perception of the world.

As an adult in the Titans of Tomorrow... Today! storyline, M'gann uses a force field that protects her from fire.

=== Weakness ===
Like all Martians, she can be weakened by fire. This is due to pyrophobia which all Martians suffer from, with fire being the Martian's "Achilles heel", equivalent to Kryptonians' weakness to Kryptonite. Exposure to fire typically causes her to lose control over some of her powers, which leaves her very faint and weakened. The "Trial by Fire" storyline reveals that the Guardians of the Universe deliberately gave the Martians pyrophobia to render them docile and suppress their aggressive nature.

== Other versions ==
- A young, alternate universe version of Miss Martian appears in Tiny Titans.
- An alternate universe version of Miss Martian from Earth-16 appears in The Multiversity.

== In other media ==
=== Television ===
Miss Martian as depicted in the first season of Young Justice

- M'gann M'orzz / Miss Martian appears in Young Justice, voiced by Danica McKellar. This version is the niece of Martian Manhunter, being 48 in Earth years and 16 by Martian biological standards, has twelve sisters and, due to facing prejudice as a White Martian growing up on Mars, initially hid her White Martian heritage via a Green Martian form based on the protagonist of her favorite sitcom, Hello, Megan!. Throughout the first season, she joins the Team, enters a relationship with teammate Superboy, meets the star of Hello, Megan!, Marie Logan, and befriends her son Garfield Logan, who M'gann later gives a blood transfusion to save his life, contributing to his becoming Beast Boy. M'gann eventually comes clean to her teammates, who accept her for who she is, with Superboy in particular revealing he always knew because of their strong telepathic link. In the second season, Invasion, she has adopted Beast Boy as a foster brother following Marie's death, but became darker and more aggressive towards those she deems "bad guys", often leaving them in catatonic states. After a failed attempt to manipulate Superboy's knowledge of an argument they had over her tactics, he broke up with her, leading to her entering a new relationship with Lagoon Boy. While taking revenge on Aqualad for Artemis Crock's apparent murder, M'gann learns the pair are working undercover to infiltrate the Light and gradually softens while restoring Aqualad's mind. Guilt-ridden over her selfish motives, she breaks up with Lagoon Boy and eventually reconciles with Superboy. As of the third season, Outsiders, M'gann has altered her Martian form to reflect her White Martian roots, became the leader of the Team, re-encounters her brother M'comm, and has begun living with Superboy, who goes on to propose to her. In the fourth season, Phantoms, M'gann and Superboy travel to Mars to undergo a Martian wedding, though she is forced to address unresolved issues with her estranged siblings and the pair become involved in the Legion of Super-Heroes' efforts to stop Lor-Zod from freeing his parents, Dru-Zod and Ursa, from the Phantom Zone. After defeating the Zods, M'gann and Superboy return to Earth, where they are married.
- The Young Justice incarnation of Miss Martian makes a non-speaking appearance in the Teen Titans Go! episode "Let's Get Serious".
- Miss Martian appears in Supergirl, portrayed by Sharon Leal. In response to the horrors the White Martians committed against the Green Martians, this version aided the latter before fleeing to Earth, where she hid for 300 years. In the present, she encounters J'onn J'onzz while taking part in Roulette's alien fight club, but tries to keep her distance out of guilt for what her kind did to his until she is forced to give him a blood transfusion after he is attacked by the Parasite, which gradually turns him into a White Martian. Upon being confronted, M'gann offers no resistance, hoping J'onn will kill her, but he imprisons her in the Department of Extranormal Operations (DEO)'s headquarters instead. Ultimately, he forgives her for what the White Martians did before returning to Mars to form a White Martian resistance movement.

=== Film ===
- The Young Justice incarnation of Miss Martian makes a non-speaking cameo appearance in Scooby-Doo! WrestleMania Mystery.
- Miss Martian appears in DC Super Hero Girls: Hero of the Year, voiced by Cristina Pucelli.
- Miss Martian makes a non-speaking cameo appearance in Teen Titans Go! To the Movies.
- Miss Martian appears in Justice League vs. the Fatal Five, voiced by Daniela Bobadilla. This version is initially an associate of the Justice League before receiving membership after helping them defeat the Fatal Five.

=== Video games ===
- Miss Martian appears as a playable character in Young Justice: Legacy, voiced again by Danica McKellar.
- Miss Martian appears as a playable character in Lego Batman 3: Beyond Gotham, voiced by Laura Bailey.
- Miss Martian appears as a character summon in Scribblenauts Unmasked: A DC Comics Adventure.
- Miss Martian appears as a playable character in Lego DC Super-Villains.

=== Miscellaneous ===
- Miss Martian appears in Smallville Season 11 Special. This version was held captive by Checkmate, but bonded with scientist King Faraday, who treated her like a surrogate daughter. Over time, Miss Martian took on an appearance based on his deceased daughter and adopts the alias "Megan Morse". Following Faraday's death, Miss Martian goes on a rampage, killing those she deems "evil" until Batman and Martian Manhunter find her. Despite initial difficulties, the latter bonds with her and she becomes his protégé and niece. She would later join Jay Garrick's Teen Titans and enter a relationship with Conner Kent.
- Miss Martian appears in DC Super Hero Girls, voiced by Cristina Pucelli. This version is a student at Super Hero High and roommates with Killer Frost, Lady Shiva, and Star Sapphire.

== See also ==
- Martian Manhunter
- One Year Later
