= Young Justice (TV series) =

American animated superhero television series

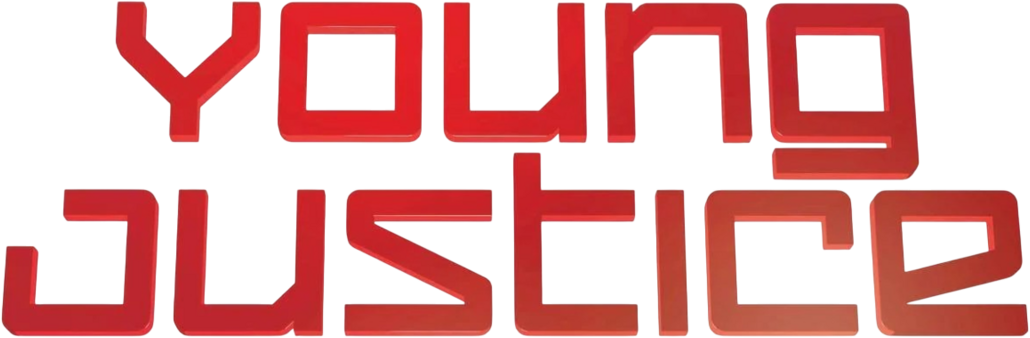
- Genre: Action; Adventure; Science fiction; Space opera
- Based on: Young Justice by: Todd Dezago; Todd Nauck; Lary Stucker; Teen Titans by: Bob Haney; Bruno Premiani; Characters by DC Comics
- Developed by: Brandon Vietti; Greg Weisman
- Starring: Jesse McCartney; Khary Payton; Jason Spisak; Nolan North; Danica McKellar; Stephanie Lemelin
- Theme music composer: Kristopher Carter; Michael McCuistion; Lolita Ritmanis
- Composers: Kristopher Carter; Michael McCuistion; Lolita Ritmanis
- Country of origin: United States
- Original language: English
- No. of seasons: 4
- No. of episodes: 98 (list of episodes)

Production
- Executive producers: Sam Register; Brandon Vietti (season 4); Greg Weisman (season 4)
- Producers: Brandon Vietti (seasons 1–3); Greg Weisman (seasons 1–3); Leanne Moreau (season 3)
- Running time: 23–28 minutes
- Production companies: DC Entertainment; Warner Bros. Animation

Original release
- Network: Cartoon Network
- Release: November 26, 2010 – March 16, 2013
- Network: DC Universe
- Release: January 4 – August 27, 2019
- Network: HBO Max
- Release: October 16, 2021 – June 9, 2022

Related
- Catwoman: Hunted; DC Showcase: Green Arrow; Green Lantern: The Animated Series

Young Justice is an American animated television superhero series developed by Greg Weisman and Brandon Vietti for Cartoon Network and later HBO Max, based loosely on a broader range of characters from the DC Universe. Set on Earth-16 within the DC Multiverse, the show focuses on the lives of teenage superheroes and sidekicks, particularly the core characters, Robin (voiced by Jesse McCartney), Kid Flash (Jason Spisak), Aqualad (Khary Payton), Superboy (Nolan North), Miss Martian (Danica McKellar), and Artemis (Stephanie Lemelin), who operate as a covert team under the supervision of the Justice League. Across its four seasons, the series evolved from a teen drama-spy series into an adult drama that explores more mature topics.

Development began between 2008 and 2009, based on an amalgamation of DC characters, particularly Young Justice and Teen Titans, and initially set during the early days of the superhero era, before much of the established DC continuity. It serves as a reboot, focusing on the formative years of the DC Universe through selected characters reflecting that timeline. Later, the series evolved into exploring more characters and various storytelling across its seasons.

The series premiered on Cartoon Network in 2010. It ran for two seasons over multiple hiatuses before being canceled in 2013. However, following strong fan support, it was revived for a third season, titled Young Justice: Outsiders, which premiered on DC Universe in 2019, followed by a fourth season, Young Justice: Phantoms, on HBO Max in 2021. Although the series has not been officially canceled, no new season has been greenlit, despite the creators confirming having plans for three more seasons.

The series was critically acclaimed for its mature, complex storytelling, and it became a cult favorite and one of Cartoon Network's highest-rated shows during its original run. It was also one of the top, most in-demand digital original series in the United States from 2019 to 2025.

== Premise ==
Young Justice spans four seasons, with each episode dated to reflect its place in the timeline. Set within the DC Multiverse, specifically on Earth-16, (Note: Earth-16 was chosen by DC Entertainment for the show because it was largely untapped, freeing the series and its franchise from established continuity restraints set by either the main DC Universe or other worlds in the Multiverse. However, it was later discovered that Earth-16 had previously been used. That pre-existing continuity was ignored by Young Justice, as it was too late to move the show to another Earth.) the series centers on a team of young sidekicks fighting to make a name for themselves: Robin, Kid Flash, Aqualad, Superboy, Miss Martian, and Artemis, who operate as covert agents under the guidance of the Justice League. Although the Justice League exists in the show, they are mostly kept in the background. The first season unfolds over roughly six months, during a time when superheroes are still a "relatively new phenomenon". It focuses on how these sidekicks come into their own, gradually introducing the characters and ultimately bringing the team together.

The second season, subtitled Young Justice: Invasion, picks up five years after the first season ended, and shortly after introduces new characters who would join the team, including Barbara Gordon, Garfield Logan, Blue Beetle, and Lagoon Boy. Other characters would also join, though they would not make the final cut. This season revolves around an alien invasion, during which the team departs Earth to undertake a mission on an alien planet called Rann. Justice League remains present but with reduced involvement as they face their own challenges. Co-producer Vietti explained that this shift was designed to "force the team into the frontline position of defending Earth, giving more space for the characters to grow and "come into their own as adults".

The third season, subtitled Young Justice: Outsiders, takes place a few years after the events of season two. It centers on an international arms race involving the trafficking of teenage metahumans, the story expands further with the introduction of Darkseid and the planet Apokolips, launching the team into intergalactic and global conflicts. Fourth session subtitled Young Justice: Phantoms focuses on the core characters from the first season—now adults—while continuing to expand the roster with new heroes. Structured around six interconnected arcs, it follows them as they navigate adulthood, personal trauma and other topics.

== Episodes ==
Season	Subtitle	Episodes		Originally released		
Season	Subtitle	Episodes		First released	Last released	Network
1	Young Justice	26		November 26, 2010	April 21, 2012	Cartoon Network
2	Invasion	20		April 28, 2012	March 16, 2013	Cartoon Network
3	Outsiders	26	13	January 4, 2019	January 25, 2019	DC Universe
3	Outsiders	26	13	July 2, 2019	August 27, 2019	DC Universe
4	Phantoms	26	13	October 16, 2021	December 30, 2021	HBO Max
4	Phantoms	26	13	March 31, 2022	June 9, 2022	HBO Max

=== Teen Titans Go! crossover and cameo appearance ===
The first crossover occurred in the Teen Titans Go! (2013–present) episode "Let's Get Serious" (2015), where members of Young Justice, criticize the Titans for being immature. The Titans then attempt to act more serious. Producer Aaron Horvath noted that the episode served as a "meta" commentary on fan criticisms comparing Teen Titans Go!'s comedic tone to the more serious Young Justice, describing it as a direct response to those complaints. A second crossover appeared in Young Justice: Outsiders (2019), in the episode "Nightmare Monkeys", where Beast Boy experiences a hallucination of a fictional cartoon called Doom Patrol Go!, animated in the style of Teen Titans Go!.

Characters based on the show versions of Zatanna, Artemis Crock, Wonder Girl, and Miss Martian, make a cameo appearance as home viewers in Scooby-Doo! WrestleMania Mystery (2014). In 2020, Young Justice characters made another cameo in Teen Titans Go! in the episodes "Justice League's Next Top Talent Idol Star: Second Greatest Team Edition" and "Justice League's Next Top Talent Idol Star: Justice League Edition".

== Cast and characters ==
The first season features 179 characters from the DC Universe, with the second season increasing the total to 241 characters. The initial six main characters were selected by the producers from a pool of 50 to 60 potential teenage superheroes from DC Comics. The following is a list of core characters:

- Dick Grayson (Jesse McCartney) is the first Robin, the protege of Batman and a young genius who uses high-tech gadgets and security hacking. During the time skip between seasons one and two, he outgrows the Robin identity to become Nightwing. He serves as the Team's leader in the second season, until returning the duties back over to Aqualad. He was also best friends with Kid Flash.
- Kaldur'ahm (Khary Payton) is Aqualad, an original character and the protege of Aquaman from Atlantis, who can breathe underwater and use hydrokinesis, the ability to increase the local specific density of water and then manipulate its shape. He is the leader of the Team, who is a natural due to his calm and level-headed demeanour. In the second season, he takes part in a deep cover mission to infiltrate the Light, pretending he betrayed the Team after discovering he is the son of Black Manta. In the third season, he becomes the second Aquaman and joins the Justice League.
- Wally West (Jason Spisak) is Kid Flash, the protege of the Flash. He is capable of running at hypersonic speed. He was the Team's resident flirtatious jokester, always quick with a joke or comeback, but gradually grows more mature and later begins a romantic relationship with Artemis. In the second season, he retired from heroics and left the Team with Artemis, but returned to help stop the impending alien invasion and later dies saving the world from an alien bomb in the finale. He is later seen in hallucinations by various characters in the third season.
- Superboy (Nolan North) is a Kryptonian-human hybrid who is a genomorph clone of Superman and shares several of his abilities. He later takes the human name Conner Kent, joins the Outsiders at the end of the third season and eventually inspires the Legion of Super-Heroes in the 31st century. He is also in a longtime romantic relationship with Miss Martian and they get married in the series finale.
- M'gann M'orzz or Megan Morse (Danica McKellar) is Miss Martian, a White Martian and the niece of Martian Manhunter. Like her uncle, she possesses telekinetic, empathic and telepathic abilities as well as flight and shape-shifting. In the first season, she is a rookie who lacks formal training, but later discovers her powers are far stronger than initially realized. By the second season, she has fully mastered her powers, but began to abuse them for most of the season until she eventually realized the error of her ways. She is also in a serious committed romance with Superboy and they marry by the end of the series.
- Artemis Crock (Stephanie Lemelin) is the protegee of Green Arrow, although she initially pretends to be his niece to the Team to hide the truth of her criminal family background. She is a highly athletic fighter and expert archer and weaponist.
  - She takes on the identity of Tigress for the deep cover mission in the second season and later makes it her new permanent identity following the death of Wally West.

== Production ==
=== Concept and development ===
The series began development between 2008 and early 2009, just after Greg Weisman finished producing The Spectacular Spider-Man (2008–2009) and Brandon Vietti directed the DC animated film Batman: Under the Red Hood (2010). Around that time, Sam Register, executive vice president of creative affairs of Warner Bros. Animation, approached them to develop a new animated series, and after several early concepts were shelved, Register proposed a show based on the concept of a cross between the Teen Titans and Young Justice (1998–2003) series of comics, but was not solely an adaptation of one or the other, with Geoff Johns, chief creative officer of DC Entertainment, and Phil Bourassa, lead character designer for the show, also played a role in the conception and development process.

The title chosen for the show was Young Justice, as Weisman explained that it was meaningfully aligned with the concept the creative team had in mind. Although it shares a name with the 1998–2003 comic series, the show is not a direct adaptation. Instead, the show is loosely based on the comic, Teen Titans, and a broader range of characters and stories from the DC Universe, serving as an amalgamation with a particular focus on the sidekicks of that world, rather than on "classic heroes". A new tie-in comic series of the same name was also released alongside the show.

The series is set during the early days of the superhero era, before much of the established DC continuity. In that sense, it serves as a reboot, focusing on the early years of the DC Universe through characters like Wally West and Dick Grayson, who were chosen over Bart Allen and Tim Drake to reflect that earlier timeline. There are several differences in the team's line-up compared to the comics. Miss Martian was added because the timing of her arrival on Earth fit within the show's early-universe concept. Aqualad, rather than Robin, is established at the beginning as the team's leader. The version of Aqualad featured in the show is an entirely new character, created by producers Weisman and Vietti, with Bourassa designing the character.

Additionally, Artemis Crock was introduced in place of Arrowette, as the producers' desire to focus on her storylines. Some characters also had their ages adjusted from their original comic versions; though the spirit and intent of the characters remained intact. Characters from the Teen Titans comic roster also appear in the series, including Garth, the original Aqualad who later becomes the third Tempest in DC Comics; Arrowette, the team's archer in the Young Justice comic series; and Wonder Girl, who was initially excluded due to legal restrictions but was later allowed to appear.

=== Writing and themes ===
Weisman and Vietti came up with ideas, characters, and plot points for at least two seasons. Although there were several characters the producers were not allowed to use in the first season (a list that became shorter along the course of the development), they were usually in charge of the decisions determining which DC Universe character would or would not be used. Peter David, who penned a majority of the comic book issues of Young Justice, was approached to write several episodes. Also attached to write were Weisman, Kevin Hopps, Andrew Robinson, Nicole Dubuc, Jon Weisman, and Tom Pugsley, with Vietti heavily involved in the book writing process. The series combines traditional superheroics with space opera, drawing heavily from the cosmic conflicts imagined by Jack Kirby.

For the first season, the producers aimed for a more "grounded and realistic" tone, while balances its darker tone with humor and romance, with Joss Whedon's work cited as a major influence It was described as a teen drama, and "youth-centric" show, its tone is less lighthearted than series "like The Batman (2004–2008) or Super Hero Squad (2009–2011), but is more in keeping with The Spectacular Spider-Man (2008–2008)." It was also noted for being "more of a spy affair in the vein of Mission: Impossible." A central theme throughout is "secrets and lies", with the "Justice League keeping secrets from the team, the young heroes hiding things from each other, and even from themselves." Though action-packed, the season occasionally features a more "frivolous narrative".

Season 2 shifts direction, incorporating "all kinds of crazy science fiction stuff" and focusing on alien invasions and extraterrestrial threats. It was described as "a single story", where each episode stands alone as a self-contained adventure, yet contributes to a larger narrative. It plays like a novel, with a stronger drive, faster pace, and heightened intensity. Weisman noted that the characters' dynamic also shifts from a mentor–protégé structure in Season 1 to a senior–freshman hierarchy in Season 2, with original members taking on leadership roles as newer heroes are introduced. While Weisman and Vietti originally indicated in the weeks prior to its release that the story of Season 2 would pick up "a minute" on the same day that Season 1 ended, the final story actually begins exactly five years after the Season 1 finale.

For Season 3, the tone would skew more adult to reflect the characters' growth as they age with the move from Cartoon Network to the streaming service having given the producers and writers more freedom to explore different aspects of the Young Justice universe. Vietti said "There's more creative room here for more adult themes and more sophisticated and challenging stories for our characters. We have a little more room to write for that now." Producer Bourassa said that Register once told the creative team they had created the "perfect show for streaming", just five years too early, citing the series' strong continuity, which made it ideal for binge-watching.

For Season 4, there is a significant shift in tone as the series continues further into "the Apokolips storyline". Weisman teased, "We've got a real slow burn on Apokolips, but it builds every season. We've had a couple of seasons in a row that have been epicly plot-focused, but I think we're pushing back to a little more of a character focus in Season 4. There will be new characters—I won't say who—but we're going to focus in more on a smaller cast." It was noted that the showrunners seem torn between letting the series evolve into a more adult drama and staying grounded in stories about teenagers balancing their dual identities as individuals and superheroes, while also trying to push the show into a more socially conscious age.

=== Production and design ===
The producers intended to create costumes based in reality to match the tone of the series while keeping consistent with traditional DC Universe continuity. A majority of the art direction was led by Vietti, who established that the costume designs should not only reflect the physical needs of the wearer, but also his or her personality, with Bourassa incorporating these ideas into his designs. In the case of Kid Flash's suit, for instance, the padding serves to reduce the force of impact experienced during skids and collisions, and the leathery texture stabilizes his "human cannonball" momentum. When asked on Twitter why he didn't direct any episodes of Young Justice, Vietti responded, "Writing while producing YJ (2 separate jobs) was already more work than I could comfortably handle. I would have liked to direct. But thankfully we had the help of many talented directors who brought in fresh ideas, made the show better and saved me from working myself to death."

Vietti cites the differences between the respective costumes of Aqualad and Robin to best illustrate what he calls "unique tailoring". Aqualad's costume is designed for the purposes of quick movement in water, and is composed of a "slick and textureless material", giving the costume its "nearly seamless and shiny" appearance. Robin's costume provides bodily protection (even against bullets) in the streets of Gotham City, and is padded and stitched with seams and sewn-in materials. Batman's batsuit matches the extra stitching lines of Robin's outfit for similar functions, except that the batsuit is more military in style whereas Robin's costume draws additional influence from athletic outfits to match his youthful energy.

=== Animation and visuals ===
Artists at the U.S. animation studio in Los Angeles, Warner Bros. Animation, drew storyboards; designed new characters, backgrounds, and props; drew character and background layouts; and made animatics. However, Greg Weisman notes that some storyboards were done in Seoul. South Korean animation studios MOI Animation, Inc. and Lotto Animation drew the key animation and inbetweens. Critics noted that the first season, features nods to Super Friends and the Justice League's comic book history, along with a brief visual homage to the anime-influenced Teen Titans series.

Certain episodes of Young Justice: Outsiders were animated by Digital eMation, another international animation studio located in South Korea. In the final stages, ink and paint and editing were done by Warner Bros. Animation.

=== Cancellation ===
In January 2013, Cartoon Network had meetings with potential clients and promotional partners in which they announced their 2013–14 programming lineup. The network had confirmed that the remaining episodes of the second season had aired entirely. Warner Bros. officially stated that they were not open to a third-party crowdfunding-campaign, intended to result in a third season. In December 2013, Kevin Smith and Paul Dini addressed the 2013 cancellation of several series, including Young Justice, claiming that network executives did not want girls watching the programs because "they don't buy toys", and wanted more boys watching. However, Weisman in 2014 denied that the show's female viewership was a factor in its cancellation.

In January 2016, Weisman revealed the reason for the show's cancellation, saying that the show's funding was based on a toy deal with Mattel. The toys were not selling enough so Mattel cancelled the toy line, pulling the funding for the show. With no sources of income large enough to replace the money from Mattel, the show was not picked up for a third season. In February 2016, when asked about the possibility of a third season, producer Vietti said that he did not know whether it would happen, but stated that he, Weisman, and character designer Bourassa would all be willing to return if given the opportunity. In the same month, in response to the show's second season being released on Netflix, Weisman posted a tweet advising fans that the chances for a third season could be helped by watching on Netflix or buying the Blu-ray releases. Weisman clarified in subsequent tweets that while Warner Bros. (or Netflix) had not expressed interest in a third season, a strong showing on Netflix could motivate WB into action on a potential third season.

In March 2016, a petition was made to convince DC Comics and Warner Bros. to revive the Young Justice comic book line, written by Christopher Jones and Weisman. In June 2016, Weisman commented that the possibility of a third season is "very real", but noted that fans need to keep the show trending to convince Netflix and Warner Bros. to pick it up for a third season. On August, 2016, David clarified on his website that when he was having lunch with Weisman a few weeks before, he stated that Weisman told him that Netflix is "seriously considering" a third season. On September 9, 2016, Weisman gave response to questions on his website Station Eight regarding the possibility of Netflix picking up the show for a third season. He stated, "I think there's a decent chance of the show coming back. Not a guarantee, mind you, but a solid decent chance. I don't say that lightly either."

=== Revival ===
On November 7, 2016, a third season was officially announced. Register, stated, "The affection that fans have had for Young Justice, and their rallying cry for more episodes, has always resonated with us. We are excited to bring the show back for this loyal fanbase and to provide an opportunity for new viewers to discover this excellent series." The original showrunners, Vietti and Weisman, would be returning. In the coming months of 2017, most of the creative teams and voice actors confirmed their return.

On July 20, 2019, while at San Diego Comic-Con, it was announced by Vietti and Weisman that DC Universe had renewed the series for a fourth season. On September 12, 2020, at DC FanDome: Explore the Multiverse, Weisman and Vietti announced that it would be titled Young Justice: Phantoms, released on HBO Max.

October 22, 2021, Weisman stated on his website, "Young Justice has NOT yet been picked up for a fifth season. So if fans want more of Earth-16, the answer is simple: #KeepBingingYJ (all four seasons) over and over. And over and over. And help us #SpreadTheWord. We want to #SaveEarth16."

On August 17, 2022, it was reported that HBO Max only ordered one season of the series and Warner Bros. Discovery had no current plans to order a new season. However, no official statement regarding the show being officially cancelled has been issued from Warner Bros. Discovery. The creators confirmed in 2023 that they already know their plans for a fifth, sixth, and seventh season, but none of them have been greenlit for production. Following the formation of DC Studios, James Gunn has stated his plans for the DC Universe are inspired by Young Justice and Justice League Unlimited, though he has yet to address Young Justice's renewal status despite greenlighting several animated DC Elseworld television series.

== Release ==
=== Broadcast and streaming services ===
Young Justice was first showcased at New York Comic Con 2010, alongside other Warner Bros. Animation projects at the time. The series debuted as a one-hour pilot on Cartoon Network and then air regularly starting in January 2011. The series resumed on Saturday, March 3, 2012, after multiple long hiatuses, with Cartoon Network launching DC Nation, an hour-long DC Comics-themed programming block that included new episodes of Young Justice and other Cartoon Network series. The second season, titled Young Justice: Invasion and featuring six fewer episodes than the previous one, premiered on April 28, 2012.

In November 2017, it was announced that a third season would premiere "sometime after September", during the fourth quarter of 2018, but in June 2018, it was announced that the premiere would be pushed back to 2019. The third season titled, Young Justice: Outsiders, premiered on January 4, 2019, on DC Universe, DC Comics' digital media service. The first 13 episodes were released throughout January, with three episodes being released every Friday except January 25, where four episodes were released. The second half of 13 episodes premiered on July 2, 2019.

The fourth season titled Young Justice: Phantoms was officially announced at DC FanDome with the surprise release of a trailer and the season's debut on the same day. The first two episodes premiered on HBO Max immediately following the announcement. New episodes began streaming weekly every Thursday starting October 21, 2021.

=== Home media ===
Three volumes of four episodes each were individually released to cover the first half of the first season, and later sold together as a "fun-pack". The remainder of the first season was released as a single package with all 14 episodes. The second season was released as two different 2 disc volumes containing 10 episodes each. The first part of the second season, "Young Justice: Invasion Destiny Calling", was released on January 22, 2013. The second part of the second season is called "Young Justice: Invasion Game of Illusions" and was released on July 16, 2013. The Blu-ray releases were handled by Warner Archive Collection. The first season's Blu-ray was released on August 12, 2014. The second season, Invasion was released on Blu-ray on December 2, 2014. The third season Outsiders was released on DVD and Blu-ray on November 26, 2019, by Warner Home Entertainment and Warner Archive Collection respectively.

Warner Bros. also released Volume 1 as part of the Justice League: 3-Pack Fun box set, which also includes the Justice League episodes "The Brave and the Bold" and "Injustice For All", and the Justice League Unlimited episodes "For the Man Who Has Everything", "The Return", and "The Greatest Story Never Told".

DVD title	Release date	Episodes	Number of Discs
Young Justice: Season One, Volume One	July 19, 2011	1–4	1
Young Justice: Season One, Volume Two	October 25, 2011	5–8	1
Young Justice: Season One, Volume Three	February 21, 2012	9–12	1
Young Justice: Dangerous Secrets (Season 1, Part 2)	July 31, 2012	13–26	2
Young Justice Invasion: Destiny Calling (Season 2, Part 1)	January 22, 2013	1–10	2
Young Justice Invasion: Game of Illusions (Season 2, Part 2)	July 16, 2013	11–20	2
Young Justice (Blu-ray)	August 12, 2014	1–26	2
Young Justice: Invasion (Blu-ray)	November 18, 2014	1–20	2
Young Justice: Outsiders (DVD/Blu-ray)	November 26, 2019	1–26	3

== Reception ==
=== Viewership and demand ===
During its initial run, the series was one of Cartoon Network's highest-rated shows. In March 2012, the DC Nation programming block achieved double- and triple-digit ratings gains compared to the previous year. The second season averaged 1.9 million viewers every Saturday after returning to Cartoon Network, with the series finale, "Endgame" becoming the network's top-rated show for the week of March 11–17, 2013, surpassing other popular series such as Regular Show (2010–2017), Adventure Time (2010–2018), and Dragons: Riders of Berk (2012–2018).

In early 2019, the data analytics company Parrot Analytics reported that the third season was one of the top two most in-demand digital original series in the U.S., alongside Titans (2018–2023). However, both series experienced a decline in demand as they entered a "hiatus" that year. In May 2023, a study by Parrot Analytics found that Young Justice is 15.2 times more in demand among U.S. viewers than the average TV series. The study using data from streaming, downloads, social media engagement, and fan and critic ratings, ranks the show in the top 2.7% of all programs in the U.S., with a 94.1% rank in the action/adventure genre. By May 2025, it maintained strong popularity with 12.3 times the average audience demand and ranked in the 97.7% within the drama genre, despite a slight 0.1% decline in demand. By August of that same year, it increased to 17.4 times the average audience demand.

=== Critical response and influence ===
Young Justice became a cult-favorite animated series, and it was praised for handling mature and complex storylines. It developed a strong fanbase that successfully rallied for its revival after the second-season cancellation in 2013. Following this cancellation, the show was described as a "mature, intelligent" series that was replaced by the "juvenile Teen Titans Go!". The series also placed at number 20 on IGN's "Top 25 Comic Book Shows of All Time", in 2011, and took third place in a TV.com readers' poll for the "Best Animated Series" of 2012 and placed fifth in 2013 even after being cancelled.

Geoff Johns took a liking to Kaldur'ahm as Aqualad, which led to the character being introduced into mainstream comic continuity in Brightest Day #4 as the second incarnation of Aqualad. In the comics, he appears as Jackson Hyde, a teenager from New Mexico largely unaware of his Atlantean roots. On the program Conan, Conan O'Brien visited Bruce Timm during one of his segments and they developed a super hero named The Flaming C. However, on several occasions, their original creation would be animated in preexisting sequences from Young Justice using the voice acting of whichever character Flaming C was placed over. These scenes were taken from "Fireworks", "Welcome to Happy Harbor", "Schooled", and "Denial".

=== Awards and nominations ===
Year	Award	Category	Notes	Result	Refs
2011	Emmy Awards	Outstanding Individual in Animation	Awarded to Phillip Bourassa for Character Design in "Independence Day"	Won	
2013	Daytime Emmy Awards	Outstanding Sound Mixing – Animation	Carlos Sanches	Nominated	
2014	Daytime Emmy Awards	Outstanding Sound Mixing – Animation	Carlos Sanches	Nominated	

== Other media ==
=== Tie-in comic series ===
A Young Justice tie-in comic book series of the same name was written by Greg Weisman and Kevin Hopps—both part of the show's writing team—as well as Art Baltazar and Franco Aureliani, with Weisman, Hopps and Brandon Vietti overseeing continuity. The comic is set between episodes of the first season and expands on events mentioned in the show and the inaugural issue was released on January 19, 2011. While children of all ages are said to be able to enjoy the series, it is specifically aimed at teenagers. The writers Art Baltazar and Franco Aureliani confirmed they introduced the Joker in the comic to set up his eventual appearance on the show. Starting with issue #20 in September 2012, the series is set in the five year time frame between the show's first and second seasons and was rebranded Young Justice: Invasion to align with its new title. The series concluded with issue #25 in November 2012.

In the two days leading up to the releases of show's third season on January 4, 2019, a two-issue digital-first comic book prequel, titled Young Justice: Outsiders, written by Weisman and drawn by Christopher Jones, was released on DC Universe. On April 6, 2022, a six-issue digital-first miniseries, titled Young Justice: Targets, was announced. Also written by Weisman and drawn by Jones, Targets serves as a follow-up to the show's fourth season while also exploring earlier events in the show's timeline. The first issue released on June 14, 2022, on DC Universe Infinite, with a physical release on July 26, 2022, and the sixth issue releasing on November 8, 2022.

The comics were later republished in two omnibus editions: Young Justice Book One: The Early Missions (2019), and Young Justice Book Two: Growing Up on May 18, 2021.

Title	Material collected	Year	ISBN	Refs
Young Justice Vol. 1	Young Justice #0–6	January 2012	978-1-4012-3357-0	
Young Justice Vol. 2: Training Day	Young Justice #7–13	November 2012	978-1-4012-3748-6	
Young Justice Vol. 3: Creature Features	Young Justice #14–19	13 February 2013	978-1-4012-3854-4	
Young Justice Vol. 4: Invasion	Young Justice: Invasion #20–25	11 December 2013	978-1-4012-4288-6	
Young Justice Book One: The Early Missions	Young Justice #0–13 and FCBD 2011 Young Justice Batman Brave and the Bold Sampler	8 October 2019	1-77950-141-2, 978-1-77950-141-7	
Young Justice Book Two: Growing Up	Young Justice #14–25 and Young Justice: Outsiders #1–2	18 May 2021	1-77950-924-3, 978-1-77950-924-6	
Young Justice: Targets	Young Justice: Targets #1-6	18 July 2023	978-1-77951-857-6	

=== Video games ===
A video game based on the show called Young Justice: Legacy was released in November 2013, for Nintendo 3DS, Microsoft Windows, PlayStation 3 and Xbox 360. Young Justice: Legacy was originally going to be released on the Wii and Wii U consoles as well, but these versions of the game were canceled due to quality issues. A Young Justice-themed downloadable content pack was released for Lego DC Super-Villains on May 14, 2019. The pack adds several playable characters from the series, along with a bonus level based on the second-season episode "Summit".

=== Other ===
Additionally, several products based on the series were licensed for release. Mattel released lines of character action figures and accompanying playsets, among other toys and games. In addition to toys for the six lead characters, figures of Cheshire, Icicle Jr., Black Canary, Batman, Aquaman, the Flash and Ra's al Ghul have been confirmed as well. Starting March 13, 2011, McDonald's restaurants began featuring Young Justice toys in their Happy Meals. Figures include Robin, Aqualad, Kid Flash, Superboy, Superman, Batman, and the villains Captain Cold and Black Manta.

The Making of Young Justice: Outsiders documentary series was premiered on January 8, 2019. Hosted by voice actor Whitney Moore, it is a five-part series features 10-minute episodes offering a behind-the-scenes look at the production of Season 3. Prior to the official announcement of Young Justice: Phantoms, select members of the voice cast, performed an original radio play titled Young Justice: FanDome – Season 3.9, Episode 1: "The Prize". Written by Weisman, the play served as an early preview of Phantoms, setting up plot elements that would later unfold in the season. It is a special event that helped maintain fan engagement, teased the continuation of the series, and provided a narrative bridge between Outsiders and Phantoms.
