= Kaldur'ahm =

Aquaman
- The Kaldur'ahm (right) and Jackson Hyde (left) characters as they appear in respective media as Aquaman.

Publication information
- Publisher: DC Comics
- First appearance: Young Justice "Independence Day (November 26, 2010)"
- First comic appearance: Brightest Day #4 (August 2010)
- Created by: Brandon Vietti; Greg Weisman; Phil Bourassa

In-story information
- Alter ego: Jackson Hyde / Kaldur'ahm
- Species: Atlantean/human hybrid (animation); Xebellian/human hybrid (comics)
- Place of origin: Atlantis (animated); New Mexico (comics)
- Team affiliations: Young Justice; Teen Titans; Justice League; Justice League Queer
- Partnerships: Ha'Wea; Aquagirl (Lorena Marquez)
- Supporting character of: Aquaman
- Notable aliases: Aqualad; Aquaman
- Abilities: Xebellian hybridized physiology grants superhuman strength, adaptation to underwater environments, enhanced senses, and the ability to swim at superhuman speed levels. Specialized Xebellian traits include hydrokinesis through telepathic control over water and electrical powers.; Skilled hand-to-hand combatant and swimmer.

Altered in-story information for adaptations to other media
- Alter ego: Kaldur'ahm
- Team affiliations: The Team; Justice League; The Light
- Partnerships: Wyynde; Aquagirl (Tula)
- Notable aliases: Aqualad; Aquaman
- Abilities: Atlantean physiology grants him superhuman strength, adaptation to underwater environments, enhanced senses, and can swim at superhuman speed levels.; Proficiency in magic; allows for mystical hydrokinesis, hydrokinetic constructs, bio-electric energy blasts, and other magical abilities.; Natural-born leader and planner, strategist, and adept in deception and duplicity

Kaldur'ahm, also known as Jackson Hyde, is a superhero appearing in both media published by DC Entertainment and American comic books published by DC Comics. While the character was created by Brandon Vietti, Greg Weisman and Phil Bourassa for the television series Young Justice, and voiced by Khary Payton, the comic book version debuted earlier in Brightest Day #1 (August 2010). While intended to be incarnations of the same character and possess various similarities, such as sharing the Aqualad and Aquaman codename and are the biological son of Black Manta, their histories and background differs.

The animated version's name is based upon Cal Durham, a henchmen and right-hand assistant of Black Manta in comics. Within the television series, Kaldur'ahm is the son of villain Black Manta and Atlantean Sha'lain'a, raised by the latter alongside his adoptive father Cal Durham, who settled into Atlantis sometime after abandoning an infiltration mission and genetically altering himself with Atlantean attributes. Known for his often mature and responsible personality growing up, he eventually became Aquaman's protege after defeating Ocean Master with the help of Garth with their skills in sorcery. Over time, as a member of the Team, he rises as a skilled and measured team leader before eventually adopting the Aquaman codename and is designated as chairman of the Justice League.

While originally developed for television, DC quickly adapted Kaldur'ahm to its mainstream comic books, with Geoff Johns and Ivan Reis re-interpreting the character. Due to the animated version's direction for the character establishing him as a familiar partner whereas the comic book version featured his introduction to Aquaman and readers the same time, aspects of the character were changed; born Jackson Hyde, the comic book version is the son of Black Manta and Lucia, the latter having ties to Xebel. Lucia raised Jackson in New Mexico, with her efforts to hide his heritage and limit his social life having a negative impact on him. Upon discovering his hydrokinetic powers and desiring an independent life, he joined the Teen Titans and adopts the Aqualad moniker from Garth's blessing and suggestion. When he eventually learns of his true origins, he makes amends with his mother. Later, he officially partners with Aquaman, whom mentors him with Lucia's support, eventually adopting the Aquaman monikers as he and Arthur work concurrently.

== Young Justice ==
Aqualad is the protégé of Aquaman and a founding member of the Team. In between the first and second seasons, he learns that he is the son of Black Manta. The episode "Downtime" reveals that Aquaman recruited Kaldur'ahm after he and Garth rescued him during a battle with Ocean Master. Garth was also offered to become Aquaman's sidekick, but remained in Atlantis to continue his studies in sorcery.

In the second season, Invasion, Kaldur works undercover within the Light to uncover who the Light's partner is. During a summit between the Light and the Reach, Kaldur is exposed as a double agent, but manages to reveal the Light's betrayal of the Reach.

In the third season, titled Young Justice: Outsiders, Kaldur becomes Aquaman after Orin retires. As the new Aquaman, Kaldur'ahm becomes the leader of the Justice League. Kaldur is also revealed to be in a relationship with an Atlantean man named Wyynde.

== Comic books ==
A different version of the character debuted in Brightest Day #4 (August 2010), shortly before the premiere of Young Justice. Although similar to his animated counterpart, the comic book incarnation of the character features key differences from the animated version, originating from the kingdom of Xebel rather than Atlantis and lacking magical abilities.

=== Pre-Flashpoint ===
==== Early life ====
A teenager from Silver City, New Mexico, Jackson Hyde avoided water because his Atlantean abilities would awaken.

==== Brightest Day ====
During Brightest Day, Jackson's Xebellian abilities activate and he learns that Black Manta is his biological father. After witnessing Jackson in the rain, his adoptive father takes him to a cottage by the sea. He tells him that Mera had given Jackson to him, asking that he keep him away from his parents, and he was given an Atlantean chest to be opened when the truth is discovered. Before the chest can be opened, Black Manta, along with Siren and her Death Squad, attacks. Jackson defends his adoptive father, but cannot stop Black Manta from shooting a trident-shaped dart at him. Jackson's adoptive father would have died if not for Aquaman's intervention, who blocks and crushes the dart.

Aquaman gets Jackson and his foster father to safety, where everything is explained to them. The chest is opened, which activates a map. Using the map, the two discover a sealed chest that only Jackson can open. Once the chest is opened, Jackson is shown a recording from Mera, who explains that his father and mother had been kidnapped and tortured by the people of Xebel while exploring the Bermuda Triangle, where the gateway to the colony is located. Xebel's king had ordered that the child, the first "outsider" born there in centuries, be experimented on to serve as a key that would finally free them from their exile. Fearing for the child's safety, Mera had stolen the infant and brought him to the surface world, where she subsequently gave him to the foster family that ended up raising him. She also reveals his true name; Kaldur'ahm. Once the recording is over, Jackson discovers several items which Mera had left for him, notably a soldier's uniform from Xebel and a pair of "Water Bearers", metallic constructs that help him control his water-manipulation abilities.

Aquaman and Jackson end up in Miami, Florida, which Black Manta and are invading. Jackson successfully uses his waterbearers to create blades, which he uses to fight off the attacking troops, and even briefly holds his own in a duel with Siren. After Black Manta severs Aquaman's right hand, Jackson attacks his father and berates him for siding with the people who killed his own wife, only for Black Manta to throw Jackson to the ground and coldly states that both he and his mother mean nothing to him. As Black Manta is about to impale his son with one of his blades, Mera arrives with Aquagirl, who saves Jackson by kicking his father in the face. After using his bio-electrical abilities to cauterize Aquaman's wound, Jackson and Mera seal Black Manta, Siren, and the rest of the invaders in the Bermuda Triangle. As the heroes celebrate, Jackson is shown to have a crush on Aquagirl. Afterwards, Mera tells Aquaman that Jackson wants to continue his training. Aquaman informs her that he has already contacted the Titans.

==== Teen Titans: Team Building ====
After Damian Wayne joins the Teen Titans, a vision of Jackson arriving at Titans Tower and confronting Superboy, Wonder Girl, Beast Boy, and Kid Flash is shown as part of a collage of future events that will affect the team.

=== DC Rebirth ===
It is mentioned that he displays a near-superhuman talent for swimming. Aqualad joined the Teen Titans after the team encountered him while exploring the San Francisco Bay for a mission.

== Powers and abilities ==
=== Young Justice version ===
Kaldur'ahm is granted various powers through his Atlantean-based hybrid physiology, possessing superhuman strength, durability, enhanced senses, capability to breathe underwater and swim at fast speeds, and one mentioned to have resistance towards poisons. In addition to his natural abilities, he trained in the mystic arts in the Conservatory of Sorcery, gaining eel-shaped tattoos. With his magical abilities, he can generate electricity, bend and shape water at will, create hard-water constructs, and utilize spell-casting.

In addition to his powers, Kaldur is an expert combatant and is considered a capable tactician and leader, having led both the Team and later became the chairman of the Justice League. He is also duplicitous, having managed to position himself within the clandestine organization, the Light, as a double agent and was able to create and perform complex manipulations and plans to maintain his position.

=== Comic book version ===
Having a hybridized Xebellian physiology, Jackson possess traits similar to other Xebellians (and, in turn, Atlanteans) such as superhuman strength, durability, underwater adaptation, and enhanced senses (allowing him to see in the dark within the dark depths of the ocean). Unlike typically Atlanteans and Xebellians, the character also possess hydrokinesis (telekinetic in nature), allowing him to control water and blood, and the power to generate electricity. These abilities often manifest from his tattoos (which he was born with), glowing eyes, and has webbed hands. In addition to his powers, the character is also a skilled combatant, having received training from Damian Wayne and Aquaman.

== Other versions ==
- A version of Aqualad appears as a part of the Ubernet Teen Titans/Justice League in the pages of Red Robin.
- Jackson Hyde appears as Aqualad in the prequel comic to Injustice 2, where he agrees to represent the oceans and joins Batman's efforts to rebuild the world after Superman's rule. Jackson is later revealed to be allied with Ra's al Ghul and assassinates the president after Blue Beetle accidentally destroys several endangered species in Ra's' reserve.
- DC Comics released the original graphic novel You Brought Me the Ocean on June 16, 2020. Written by Alex Sánchez and drawn by Jul Maroh, the story focuses on Jake Hyde's teenage years in Truth or Consequences, New Mexico and learning to cope with his father's drowning while also struggling with his sexuality, future college plans, and burgeoning superpowers. Kirkus Reviews praised You Brought Me the Ocean as "a worthy, diverse addition to the DC Universe". The graphic novel was nominated for the 32nd GLAAD Media Awards (2021) for Outstanding Comic Book. On April 8, 2022, it was announced that You Brought Me the Ocean would be adapted as a live-action series released on HBO Max. Charlize Theron, A.J. Dix, Beth Kono, and Andrew Haas of Denver & Delilah Films are executive producers for the series.

== In other media ==
=== Television ===
- Aqualad appears in the Teen Titans Go! episode "Let's Get Serious", voiced again by Khary Payton.
- Aqualad appears in the Mad segment "Teen Titanic".

=== Film ===
- An alternate universe version of Kaldur'ahm makes a cameo appearance in Justice League: The Flashpoint Paradox as a member of Aquaman's army before being killed in battle with the Amazons.
- Aqualad makes a cameo appearance via photographs in Batman and Superman: Battle of the Super Sons.

=== Video games ===
- Aqualad appears as a playable character in Young Justice: Legacy, voiced again by Khary Payton.
- Aqualad appears as an unlockable playable character in Lego DC Super-Villains.
- Aqualad appears in DC Universe Online.
- Aqualad appears in DC Legends.
