= Brandon Vietti =

American animator, director, and producer

- Born: 1974 (age 50–51); Fresno, California, U.S.
- Education: The Kubert School
- Occupations: Animator; director; producer
- Years active: 2006–present
- Known for: Young Justice

Brandon Vietti (born 1974) is an American animator, director, and producer.

== Early life ==
Vietti attended The Kubert School.

== Career ==
Vietti developed and co-produces the animated television show Young Justice with Greg Weisman. He has also worked on various other animation projects for DC Comics and Warner Bros. Animation. He worked as a director for The Batman and Batman: The Brave and the Bold, directing every third episode. For his work on The Batman, he won an Emmy Award in 2006. He directed the animated film Batman: Under the Red Hood and Watchmen.
