= Tempest =

Tempest is a synonym for a storm.

The Tempest is a play by William Shakespeare.

Tempest or The Tempest may also refer to:

== Arts and entertainment ==
=== Films ===
- The Tempest (1908 film), a British silent film
- The Tempest (1911 film), an American silent film
- Tempest (1928 film), a John Barrymore film
- The Tempest (1935 film), a Chinese film of the 1930s
- Tempest (1958 film), an Alberto Lattuada film
- The Tempest (1960 film), an American television film
- The Tempest (1963 film), an Australian television film
- The Tempest (1979 film), a film by Derek Jarman
- Tempest (1982 film), a Paul Mazursky film
- The Tempest, a 1998 made-for-TV film by Jack Bender
- The Tempest (2010 film), a Julie Taymor film
- Tempest, a 2012 film by Rob Curry and Anthony Fletcher
- Tempest (2015 film), an animated short film

=== Literature ===
- Tempest (Bulis novel), a 1998 Doctor Who spin-off novel by Christopher Bulis
- Tempest (Denning novel), a 2006 Star Wars novel by Troy Denning
- The Tempest (Dryden and D'Avenant play), a 1667 adaptation of Shakespeare's play by John Dryden and William d'Avenant
- The Mock Tempest, a parody of The Tempest by Dryden and D'Avenant by Thomas Duffet
- The Tempest, a Star Trek: Deep Space Nine novel by Susan Wright
- The League of Extraordinary Gentlemen, Volume IV: The Tempest, part of the comic book series

=== Music ===
==== Classical music ====
- The Tempest (Sullivan), Arthur Sullivan's 1861 incidental music to Shakespeare's play
- The Tempest (Sibelius), Jean Sibelius's 1926 incidental music to Shakespeare's play
- The Tempest (Tchaikovsky), an 1873 symphonic fantasy by Tchaikovsky
- "Tempest Sonata" or Piano Sonata No. 17, a piano sonata by Ludwig van Beethoven
- The Tempest, Op. 46 (1880), a symphonic poem by Zdeněk Fibich

==== Operas ====
- The Tempest (Adès), a 2004 opera by Thomas Adès
- The Tempest (Hoiby), a 1986 opera by Lee Hoiby, after Shakespeare
- La Tempesta, a 1850 opera in Italian, by Fromental Halévy, after Shakespeare
- The Tempest (Smith), a 1756 opera by John Christopher Smith
- The Tempest, opus Z 631, a 1695 (?) semi-opera attributed to Henry Purcell

==== Bands ====
- Tempest (Celtic rock band), an American Celtic rock band group
- Tempest (musician), electronic/alternative American rock band founded by Gabrielle Wortman
- Tempest (British band), a British progressive rock group
- Tempest (South Korean band), a South Korean boy group
- The Tempest (band), a British pop band

==== Albums ====
- Tempest (Balflare album), 2006
- Tempest (Bob Dylan album), 2012
- Tempest (Jesse Cook album), 1995
- Tempest (Tussle album), 2012
- The Tempest (album), by Insane Clown Posse, 2007

==== Songs ====
- "Tempest" (Bob Dylan song), 2012
- "Tempest" (Deftones song), 2012
- "Tempest", by A Storm of Light from Forgive Us Our Trespasses, 2009
- "Tempest", by Delta-S from Voyage to Isis, 2007
- "Tempest", by Ethel Cain from Willoughby Tucker, I'll Always Love You, 2025
- "Tempest", by Low from Double Negative, 2018
- "Tempest", by Lucius from Nudes, 2018
- "Tempest", by Namie Amuro from the triple A-side single "Naked"/"Fight Together"/"Tempest", 2011
- "The Tempest", by Mike Oldfield from Music of the Spheres, 2008
- "The Tempest", by Pendulum from In Silico, 2008
- "7empest" (pronounced "tempest"), by Tool from Fear Inoculum, 2019

=== Paintings ===
- The Tempest (Giorgione), a 1508 work by Giorgione
- The Tempest, a 1913–1914 painting by Oskar Kokoschka also known as The Bride of the Wind

=== Sculptures ===
- The Tempest (La Tempête) sculpture by Auguste Rodin
- The Tempest (Hebald), an outdoor sculpture by Milton Hebald in Central Park, New York, U.S.

=== Television ===
- Tempest (TV series), a 2025 South Korean drama
- "Tempest" (Smallville), a 2002 episode of Smallville
- The Tempest, a Dharma Initiative station on Lost

=== Other arts and entertainment ===
- Tempest (comics), various comic book titles and characters
- Tempest (video game), a 1981 arcade game from Atari
- Tempest (Magic: The Gathering), an expansion to the Magic: The Gathering collectible card game
- The Tempest (Ars Magica), a series of adventures for role-playing game Ars Magica published in 1990
- Tempest, a fictional starship in the video game Mass Effect: Andromeda
- Tempest, the second original class introduced in the video game Diablo Immortal
- Claire-Ann Byers (codenamed Tempest), an operator from Delta Force (2025 video game)

== Military ==
- Hawker Tempest, a World War II–era British Royal Air Force fighter plane
- BAE Systems Tempest, a planned British Royal Air Force fighter plane
- HMS Tempest (H71), an R-class destroyer launched in 1917
- HMS Tempest (N86), a T-class submarine launched in 1941
- USS Tempest (1862), a Civil War gunboat
- USS Tempest (1869), a monitor renamed USS Yuma
- USS Tempest (PC-2), a Cyclone-class coastal patrol ship launched in 1992
- SD Tempest, a tugboat supporting the UK's Naval Service
- Operation Tempest, a World War II operation of the Polish Home Army
- Tempest, a variant of the Centurion tank used in Singapore
- Tempest MPV, a British army version of the Cougar military vehicle

== People ==
- Tempest (surname)
- Tempest Anderson (1846–1913), English ophthalmic surgeon, amateur photographer and vulcanologist
- Tempestt Bledsoe (born 1973), American actress
- Tempest DuJour, American drag queen
- Tempest Storm, stage name of American exotic dancer, burlesque dancer, and film actress Annie Blanche Banks (1928–2021)

== Transportation ==
- Tempest (ship), a steamship of the Anchor Line that vanished in 1857
- Tempest (keelboat)
- Moyes Tempest, a glider produced by Moyes Microlights
- Pontiac Tempest, an automobile produced by General Motors from 1961 to 1970 and 1987 to 1991
- VinFast Tempest, an electric scooter manufactured by VinFast

== Other uses ==
- Tempest (codename), a standard of shielding for wires and computers used by the U.S. and other governments
- Tempest Peak, a mountain in Ross Dependency, Antarctica
- Tempest Stele, a stele erected by Egyptian Pharaoh Ahmose I c. 1550 BC
- The Tempest (media company), digital media startup, founded 2016
- Tempest, a brand operated by the department store Menarys
- Tempest, the watermelon flavor of the chewing gum 5 in Australia and New Zealand

== See also ==
- Der Sturm (opera), a German-language opera by Frank Martin
- The Tempests (disambiguation)
