= Tempest (comics) =

Tempest, in comics, may refer to:

DC Comics:

- Tempest (DC Comics), five DC Comics characters of the same name including:
  - Joshua Clay
  - Christopher Champion of Atari Force
  - Garth of Atlantis, Aquaman's sidekick
  - Mike Tempest, a character who became involved with the Secret Six
  - Margaret "Meg" Tempest, a reporter at the Daily Planet

Marvel Comics:

- Angel Salvadore, who has used the name Angel as well as Tempest
- Tempest, later renamed Flashfire because of the DC character; he was Grannz, a member of the Imperial Guard
- Nicolette Giroux, known as Tempest, who was a member of The Exemplars
- "The Tempest" was a storyline in Ultimate X-Men

Others:

- Tempest, a charity fund-raising one-shot from Alias Enterprises
- The Tempest, a graphic novel adaptation of the Shakespeare play by Self Made Hero
- Tempest (2000 AD), a Judge Dredd spin-off story by Al Ewing

== See also ==
- Tempest
