= David Fairbanks =

American fighter pilot and flying ace

David Charles Fairbanks
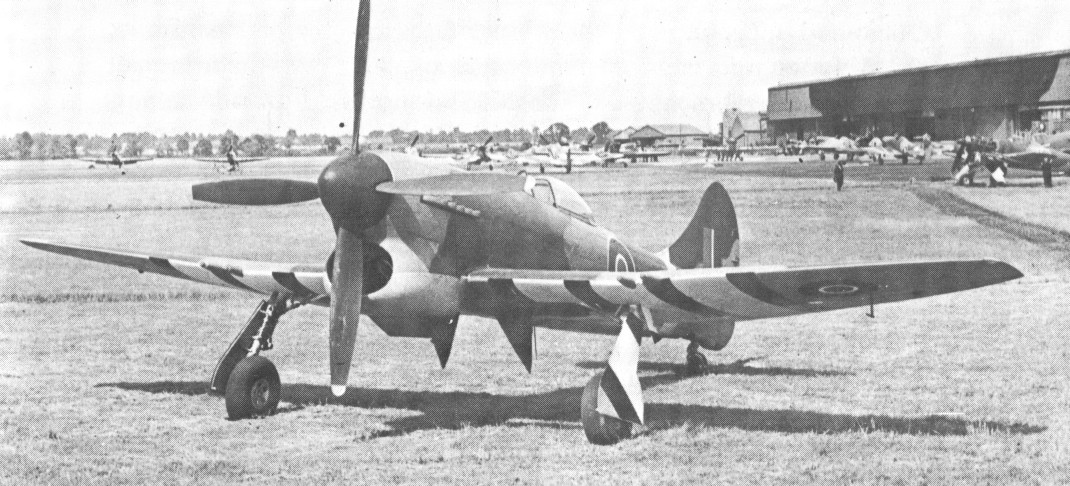
- An example of the Hawker Tempest Mk V on which Fairbanks scored 13 aerial victories
- Born: 22 August 1922; Ithaca, New York
- Died: 1975
- Military career
- Allegiance: United Kingdom; Canada
- Branch: Royal Canadian Air Force; Royal Air Force
- Service years: 1941-1955
- Rank: Squadron Leader
- Nicknames: Foob, The Terror of the Rhine
- Units: No. 3 Squadron RAF; No. 501 Squadron RAF; No. 274 Squadron RAF
- Commands: No. 274 Squadron RAF
- Conflicts: World War Two
- Awards: DFC & Two Bars

Squadron Leader David Charles Fairbanks DFC & Two Bars (22 August 1922 – 1975) was an American fighter pilot and flying ace who served in the Royal Canadian Air Force during the Second World War. During the war, he scored 14 aerial victories, 13 of them on the Hawker Tempest, making him the highest scoring ace for that aircraft.

== Early life ==
Fairbanks was born in Ithaca, New York. After finishing high school, he ran away from home and joined the Royal Canadian Air Force. He was accepted on his second attempt and enlisted in Hamilton, Ontario in February 1941. He didn't transfer to the USAAF when the USA entered the war.

== World War Two ==
After training, he was posted as a flight instructor to the No. 13 Service Flying Training School. After a year as a flight instructor, he got a posting in the UK to the No. 501 Squadron RAF at RAF Hawkinge, flying the Spitfire Mk V. He scored his first victory on 8 June 1944, shooting down a Messerschmitt Bf 109 near Le Havre It was also the only victory he scored in a Spitfire. When 501 Squadron was re-equipped with Tempests, he was posted to No. 274 Squadron RAF. Before moving to Europe, Fairbanks shot down two V-1 flying bombs. Over the next two-and-a-half months, he scored 11 1/2 victories. Thus, he achieved with a remarkable tactic - at about 5 o' clock every day, he would orbit the airbase in the Rhine at 3,000 feet and regularly, dive to ground level for a few seconds, before climbing back to altitude. As the airfield was the most frequently-used base by Luftwaffe fighters, he would usually make contact with a Bf 109 or Focke-Wulf Fw 190. This tactic, although effective, meant he frequently lost his No 2's, which French ace Pierre Clostermann clearly disapproves as taking too much risks and exposing the life of your fellow aviators, all for the sake of bettering one's score. On 19 November 1944, Fairbanks was hit by ground fire. His fuel tank ignited and burned away his fuselage, but he was able to return to Volkel safely. He was posted to No. 3 Squadron in December 1944, then back to No. 274 Squadron on 9 February 1945 as squadron leader. Two days later, he downed an Arado Ar 234 jet reconnaissance bomber, the first of its type to be downed by the allies.

On his way back from a train busting mission on 28 February 1945, Fairbanks was leading a section of 6 aircraft, including flying ace (and later author) Pierre Clostermann to attack 40 Fw 190s and Bf 109s. He was shot down by a Fw 190 and captured. He spent the rest of the war as a prisoner of war.

== Post-war and later life ==
After the war, he flew de Havilland Vampires and Lockheed T-33s with the Royal Canadian Air Force. He also spent two years in the UK flying Gloster Meteors. In 1955, he became a test pilot for de Havilland Canada. In 1975, he died at the age of 52.

== Decorations and honours ==
Fairbanks was awarded the Distinguished Flying Cross three times:

- First on 23 January 1945 while serving in No. 274 Squadron for bringing himself and his aircraft back to base despite it being on flames from damage sustained from ground fire.
- The second DFC was awarded on 6 March 1945 while serving in No. 3 Squadron as a Flight Lieutenant for shooting down five aircraft in the span of a few weeks, bringing his tally of victories up to eight.
- He received his third DFC on 20 July 1945, while serving with the No. 74 Squadron RAF for shooting down six more aircraft, including a jet.
