= The Tempests =

The Tempests or Tempests may refer to:

- The Tempests (book) (1920), by Kahlil Gibran
- The Tempests (band), an American classic rock band
- The Tempests, original name of The Royals, a Jamaican roots reggae vocal group
- "Tempests" (The Outer Limits), an episode of The Outer Limits
