= List of Young Justice characters =

The following is a list of characters that appear in the Young Justice TV series and its comic book tie-ins.

Note for reading: The designations for the characters are used when Zeta Beams transport them from one place to another, and are normally spoken in episode by an automated voice (Stephanie Lemelin). Numbers without a letter represent members of the Justice League; A rank represents individuals authorized to use Zeta Beams; B rank represents members of the Team; C rank represents the Team's pets; D rank represents members of the Outsiders; E rank represents the reserve members of the Justice League; G rank represents the members of Nightwing's splinter team; Z rank represents members of Batman, Incorporated; and L represents Light members.

== Overview ==
Character	Voice Actor	Seasons				Comic Books			Video game	Audio Play
Character	Voice Actor	1	Invasion	Outsiders	Phantoms	2011 comic series	Outsiders	Targets	Legacy	The Prize
The Team
Dick Grayson / Robin / Nightwing	Jesse McCartney	Main	Main	Main	Main	Main		Main	Main	
Kaldur'ahm / Aqualad / Aquaman / Doctor Fate	Khary Payton	Main	Main	Main	Main	Main		Guest	Main	Main
Wally West / Kid Flash / Doctor Fate	Jason Spisak	Main	Recurring	Guest	Guest	Main		Guest	Main	
Kon-El / Conner Kent / Superboy	Nolan North	Main	Main	Main	Main	Main	Main	Main	Main	Main
M'gann M'orzz / Megan Morse / Miss Martian	Danica McKellar	Main	Main	Main	Main	Main	Main	Main	Main	Main
Artemis Crock / Artemis / Tigress	Stephanie Lemelin	Main	Main	Main	Main	Main		Main	Main	Main
Zatanna Zatara / Zatanna / Doctor Fate	Lacey Chabert	Main	Recurring	Recurring	Main	Recurring		Guest	Main	
Roy Harper / Will Harper / Speedy / Red Arrow	Crispin Freeman	Main	Recurring	Recurring	Recurring			Main		Main
Raquel Ervin / Rocket	Kali Troy (S1); Denise Boutte (S2–present)	Recurring	Recurring	Recurring	Main	Recurring		Guest	Main	Main
La'gaan / Lagoon Boy / Aquaman	Yuri Lowenthal	Guest	Recurring	Guest	Recurring	Recurring		Guest		
Barbara Gordon / Batgirl / Oracle	Alyson Stoner	Guest	Recurring	Recurring	Recurring	Recurring	Main	Recurring	Main	
Karen Beecher / Bumblebee	Masasa Moyo	Recurring	Recurring	Guest		Recurring		Guest		
Mal Duncan / Guardian	Kevin Michael Richardson	Recurring	Recurring	Guest		Recurring		Guest		
Cissie King-Jones / Arrowette	Kelly Stables	Guest		Recurring	Recurring			Recurring		
Roy Harper / Speedy / Arsenal	Crispin Freeman	Guest	Recurring	Guest	Recurring			Recurring		Recurring
Stephanie Brown / Spoiler	Mae Whitman		Guest	Recurring	Recurring			Recurring		
Gabrielle Daou / Violet Harper / Halo	Zehra Fazal			Main	Recurring			Recurring		
Traci Thurston / Thirteen / Doctor Fate	Lauren Tom			Recurring	Recurring			Recurring		
Cassandra Wu-San / Orphan	N/A			Guest	Recurring			Recurring		
Andie Murphy / Mist	Daniela Bobadilla			Recurring	Recurring			Recurring		
Khalid Nassour / Doctor Fate	Usman Ally				Recurring					
Outsiders
Garfield Logan / Beast Boy	Logan Grove (S1–S2); Greg Cipes (S3–present)	Guest	Recurring	Main	Main	Recurring	Main	Main	Recurring	
Tim Drake / Robin	Cameron Bowen		Recurring	Recurring	Recurring	Recurring		Recurring	Recurring	
Jaime Reyes / Blue Beetle	Eric Lopez		Main	Recurring	Recurring	Recurring		Recurring		
Cassie Sandsmark / Wonder Girl	Mae Whitman		Recurring	Recurring	Recurring	Recurring		Recurring		
Virgil Hawkins / Static	Bryton James		Recurring	Recurring	Recurring			Recurring		
Eduardo Dorado Jr. / El Dorado	Freddy Rodriguez		Recurring	Recurring	Recurring			Recurring		
Bart Allen / Impulse / Kid Flash	Jason Marsden		Recurring	Recurring	Recurring	Recurring		Recurring		
Brion Markov / Geo-Force	Troy Baker			Main	Recurring			Recurring		
Tara Markov / Terra	Tara Strong			Main	Recurring			Recurring		
Fred Bugg / Forager	Jason Spisak			Main	Recurring			Recurring		Recurring
Victor Stone / Cyborg	Zeno Robinson			Main	Recurring			Recurring		
Courtney Whitmore / Stargirl	Whitney Moore			Recurring	Recurring			Recurring		
Leslie Willis / Livewire	Britt Baron			Recurring	Recurring			Recurring		
Wendy Jones / Windfall	Zehra Fazal			Recurring	Recurring			Recurring		
Lia Briggs / Looker	Grey Griffin			Guest	Recurring			Recurring		
Justice League
Kal-El / Clark Kent / Superman	Nolan North	Recurring	Recurring	Recurring	Main	Recurring		Recurring	Recurring	
Bruce Wayne / Batman	Bruce Greenwood	Recurring	Recurring	Recurring	Guest	Recurring		Guest	Recurring	
Oliver Queen / Green Arrow	Alan Tudyk	Recurring	Recurring	Guest		Recurring		Main		
Orin / Aquaman I	Phil LaMarr	Recurring	Recurring	Guest	Recurring	Recurring		Guest	Recurring	
Barry Allen / Flash	George Eads (S1-S2); James Arnold Taylor (S2–present)	Recurring	Recurring	Recurring		Recurring		Guest		
J'onn J'onzz / John Jones / Martian Manhunter	Kevin Michael Richardson	Recurring	Recurring	Recurring	Recurring	Recurring				
John Smith / Red Tornado	Jeff Bennett	Recurring	Recurring	Recurring	Guest	Recurring		Guest	Recurring	
Giovanni Zatara / Zatara / Doctor Fate	Nolan North	Recurring		Guest	Recurring	Guest		Guest		
Billy Batson / Captain Marvel / Shazam	Rob Lowe / Chad Lowe (as Shazam); Robert Ochoa / Eric Lopez (as Billy Batson)	Recurring	Recurring	Recurring	Guest	Recurring		Guest		
Nathaniel Adams / Captain Atom	Michael T. Weiss	Recurring	Recurring	Guest		Recurring		Guest		
Princess Diana / Wonder Woman	Maggie Q	Recurring	Recurring	Recurring	Guest	Recurring		Guest		
Katar Hol / Hawkman	James Arnold Taylor	Recurring	Recurring	Guest		Recurring		Guest		
Shayera Hol / Hawkwoman	Danica McKellar (second season) Zehra Fazal (third season)	Recurring	Recurring	Guest	Guest	Recurring		Guest		
Hal Jordan / Green Lantern	Dee Bradley Baker	Recurring	Guest	Guest		Guest		Guest		
John Stewart / Green Lantern	Kevin Michael Richardson	Recurring	Recurring	Recurring				Guest	Recurring	
Dinah Laurel Lance / Black Canary	Vanessa Marshall	Recurring	Recurring	Recurring	Recurring	Recurring		Recurring	Recurring	
Nabu / Doctor Fate	Kevin Michael Richardson	Recurring	Recurring	Recurring	Recurring			Guest		
Arnus / Icon	Tony Todd	Recurring	Recurring	Recurring				Guest		
Guy Gardner / Green Lantern	Troy Baker	Guest	Guest	Recurring				Guest		
Patrick O'Brian / Plastic Man	N/A	Recurring	Recurring	Guest	Guest			Guest		
Ray Palmer / Atom	Jason Marsden	Recurring	Recurring	Guest		Recurring		Guest		
Jefferson Pierce / Black Lightning	Khary Payton		Recurring	Main	Recurring	Recurring		Recurring		
John Henry Irons / Steel	Zeno Robinson			Recurring	Recurring					
Tatsu Yamashiro / Katana	N/A			Recurring						
Curtis Metcalf / Hardware	N/A			Recurring						
Tora Olafsdotter / Ice	N/A			Recurring	Guest					
Rex Mason / Metamorpho	Fred Tatasciore			Recurring						
Ralph Dibny / Elongated Man	David Kaye			Recurring				Guest		
The Light
Vandar Adg / Varl'Jat / Marduk / Genghis Khan / Vandal Savage / L-1	Miguel Ferrer (S1-S2); David Kaye (S3-)	Recurring	Recurring	Recurring	Recurring					
Ra's al Ghul / L-2	Oded Fehr	Recurring	Recurring	Guest	Guest	Recurring				
Lex Luthor / L-3	Mark Rolston	Recurring	Recurring	Recurring	Recurring	Recurring		Guest	Recurring	
Queen Bee / L-4	Marina Sirtis	Recurring	Recurring	Recurring	Guest	Guest		Recurring		
Orm Marius / Ocean Master / L-5	Roger Craig Smith	Recurring		Guest	Recurring	Recurring				
Brain / L-6	Corey Burton	Recurring	Recurring			Recurring				
Klarion the Witch Boy / L-7	Thom Adcox-Hernandez	Recurring	Recurring	Recurring	Recurring				Recurring	
Black Manta / L-8	Khary Payton	Guest	Recurring	Guest					Recurring	Recurring
Ultra-Humanite / L-10	Greg Weisman	Guest		Recurring	Recurring	Recurring				
Slade Wilson / Deathstroke / L-9	Wentworth Miller (1st); Fred Tatasciore (2nd)		Recurring	Recurring	Guest					
Zviad Baazovi / L-12	Yuri Lowenthal			Recurring	Guest			Guest		
League of Shadows
Lawrence "Crusher" Crock / Sportsmaster	Nick Chinlund	Recurring	Recurring	Guest	Recurring	Guest		Guest	Recurring	
Sensei	Keone Young	Guest		Guest	Recurring	Recurring				
Jade Nguyen / Cheshire	Kelly Hu	Recurring	Recurring	Recurring	Recurring				Recurring	
Eric Needham / Black Spider	Josh Keaton	Recurring		Guest	Recurring	Recurring				
Hook	N/A	Recurring				Recurring				
Professor Ojo	Nolan North	Recurring								
Ubu	Fred Tatasciore		Recurring	Guest		Recurring				
Talia al Ghul	Zehra Fazal			Guest	Recurring	Recurring				
Cassandra Savage	Zehra Fazal			Recurring	Recurring					
Richard Swift / Shade	Joel Swetow			Guest	Recurring					
Sandra Wu-San / Lady Shiva	Gwendoline Yeo			Recurring	Recurring					
Onyx Adams	Logan Browning				Recurring					
Rictus	Gwendoline Yeo				Recurring					
New Gods of Apokolips
DeSaad	Dee Bradley Baker	Guest	Guest	Recurring	Recurring					
Darkseid	Michael-Leon Wooley		Guest	Recurring	Recurring					
Kalibak	Dee Bradley Baker			Guest	Recurring					
Gretchen Goode / Granny Goodness / L-11	Deborah Strang			Recurring	Recurring					
Big Barda	Grey Griffin			Guest	Recurring					
Grayven	Dee Bradley Baker			Guest	Recurring					
Mary Bromfield / Sergeant Marvel / Dark Mary	Erika Ishii				Recurring			Guest		
Onslaught
Cameron Mahkent / Icicle Jr.	Yuri Lowenthal	Recurring	Recurring	Recurring	Guest	Recurring			Recurring	
Baran Flinders / Mammoth	N/A	Recurring	Recurring	Recurring	Guest	Recurring		Recurring		
Selinda Flinders / Shimmer	N/A	Recurring	Recurring	Recurring		Recurring		Recurring		
Simon Jones / Psimon	Alan Tudyk	Recurring	Recurring	Recurring	Guest	Recurring	Recurring	Recurring	Recurring	
Tommy Terror	Yuri Lowenthal	Guest	Guest	Recurring	Recurring					
Tuppence Terror	Danica McKellar	Guest	Guest	Recurring	Recurring					Recurring
Devastation	Diane Delano	Guest	Recurring	Recurring		Recurring		Recurring		
Leonard Smalls / Holocaust	Zeno Robinson			Recurring						
Match	Nolan North	Recurring			Recurring	Recurring		Recurring		
Juan Cordero / Metallo	N/A							Recurring		
Recurring Villains
Victor Fries / Mr. Freeze	Keith Szarabajka	Recurring				Guest				
Crystal Frost / Killer Frost	Sarah Shahi	Recurring		Guest					Recurring	
Leonard Snart / Captain Cold	Alan Tudyk	Recurring	Guest							
Mark Desmond / Blockbuster	René Auberjonois	Recurring				Recurring			Recurring	
Thomas O. Morrow / T.O. Morrow	Jeff Bennett	Recurring				Recurring				
Bromwell Stikk / Mister Twister	John de Lancie	Recurring								
Daniel Brickwell / Brick	Khary Payton	Recurring		Recurring						Recurring
Bane	Danny Trejo	Recurring		Guest					Recurring	
Jeffrey Burr / Kobra	Arnold Vosloo	Guest			Guest	Recurring				
Anthony Ivo / Professor Ivo	Peter MacNicol	Recurring		Guest		Recurring				
Amazo	Peter MacNicol	Recurring	Recurring			Recurring				
Abra Kadabra	Jeff Bennett	Recurring		Guest						
Matt Hagen / Harlan Matthews / Clayface	Nolan North	Guest	Guest	Guest	Guest	Recurring		Recurring		Recurring
Werner Vertigo / Count Vertigo	Steve Blum	Recurring		Recurring	Guest			Recurring		
The Joker	Brent Spiner	Recurring			Guest	Recurring				
Helga Jace	Grey Griffin			Main	Guest					

== Main characters ==
=== "The Team" ===
The Team's photo in the episode "Tale of Two Sisters" as of fourth season.

Member	2010	2011	2012	2013	2014	2015	2016	2017	2018	2019	2020
Robin / Nightwing						L					
Aqualad	L										
Kid Flash							D				
Superboy											
Miss Martian								L			
Artemis / Tigress										L	
Zatanna											
Speedy / Red Arrow											
Rocket											
Tempest											
Aquagirl						D					
Troia											
Robin				D							
Lieutenant Marvel											
Sergeant Marvel											
Batgirl / Oracle											
Bumblebee											
Lagoon Boy											
Beast Boy											
Robin											
Wonder Girl											
Blue Beetle											
Impulse / Kid Flash											
Guardian											
Speedy / Arsenal							E				
Static											
Arrowette											
Spoiler											
Thirteen											
Geo-Force											
Halo											
Forager											
Terra											
Orphan											
Mist											

==== Founding members ====
The initial six main characters were chosen by the producers, from a list of potential candidates of 50 to 60 DC Comics teenage superheroes. The criteria consisted of age, powers, personality, cultural icon status, and dynamics. An additional regular, Zatanna, was introduced partway through the first season, and Rocket was added at the end of the first season.

- Nightwing / Robin / Dick Grayson (voiced by Jesse McCartney) - Designation: B01. Known as Robin throughout first season; Grayson was, though only 13, the most experienced member of the team. He does not possess any superpowers; however, he is an excellent hand-to-hand combatant, tactician, and a technological genius. He repeatedly plays with the English language, particularly with words which cease to function without prefixes, such as "disaster" ("aster"), "overwhelmed" ("whelmed"), and "distraught" ("traught"). Batman had forbidden Robin from revealing his secret identity to the team, though Kid Flash was aware of it. Later in the series, Dick assumes the identity of Nightwing and becomes the leader of the team.
- Aquaman / Aqualad / Kaldur'ahm (voiced by Khary Payton) - Designation: B02; later 27. In the first season, Kaldur'ahm (or "Kaldur" for short) was the 16-year-old leader of the team. His powers, channeled through the tattoos on his arms, are a mixture of Atlantean sorcery and science. He displays super strength, durability, as well as the ability to breathe and speak underwater, typical of Atlanteans. He also possesses the ability to form hard water constructs through the use of his Atlantean water bearers and to generate electricity. He was selected as the initial leader for the Team, but stated that he did not want to remain leader and wished to turn over leadership to Robin when he was ready, saying that it was his destiny to lead this team. By the third season, Kaldur has assumed the Aquaman mantle and is co-leader of the Justice League along with Wonder Woman.
- Kid Flash / Wally West (voiced by Jason Spisak) - Designation: B03. Wally is the nephew-in-law of Barry Allen and gained his powers from an attempt to recreate the accident that gave Barry powers. Ava Dordi of the Palo Alto Voice notes that Spisak "captures the lighthearted essence of Kid Flash well". In the second season, Kid Flash has retired and is in a relationship with Artemis, the two attending college and living together. He returns to the team during "Summit" and helps to stop the Reach's final attack on Earth. In the episode "Endgame", Wally is killed while trying to stop the Magnetic Field Disruptor, a Reach weapon that was placed on Earth.
- Superboy / Kon-El / Conner Kent (voiced by Nolan North) - Designation: B04, later D09. Superboy is a hybrid human-Kryptonian clone of Superman and Lex Luthor who was created by Project Cadmus. Superboy possesses abilities similar to Superman, which are inhibited by his human DNA. Luthor gives Superboy patches which unlock his full Kryptonian abilities; however, they only last for typically an hour and his aggression increases as well. Later in the series, Superboy and Miss Martian fall in love and travel to Mars, intending to get married. They are secretly followed by Saturn Girl, Phantom Girl and Chameleon Boy, who are protecting Superboy against Lor-Zod to save their future since Superboy's inspiration and heroism will form the Legion of Super-Heroes. Superboy is apparently killed stopping Ma'alefa'ak's bomb, but is secretly transported to the Phantom Zone by Phantom Girl. In the Phantom Zone, Superboy encounters General Zod, who begins to take advantage and manipulate him. Superboy is later reunited with his friends who have come to rescue him, but due to lingering Zone-Sickness, he remains under Zod’s control. Eventually, Superboy is finally freed from the Phantom Zone and his mind restored after being reunited with Miss Martian, who he marries after returning to Earth.
- Miss Martian / M'gann M'orzz / Megan Morse (voiced by Danica McKellar) - Designation: B05. Miss Martian is Martian Manhunter's teenage niece, as well as being an inexperienced superhero. As a Martian, she possesses various abilities, including telekinesis, telepathy, and shapeshifting that enables her to become invisible and intangible. It is later revealed that M'gann is a White Martian who disguised herself as a Green Martian and modeled her human appearance after the eponymous protagonist of the television series Hello, Megan!. Later in the series, Miss Martian and Superboy enter a relationship and eventually marry.
- Tigress / Artemis / Artemis Crock (voiced by Stephanie Lemelin) - Designation: B07. Artemis is the daughter of the supervillains Sportsmaster and Huntress and an archer who initially claims to be Green Arrow's niece. In the second season, she and Wally West (Kid Flash) have retired and attend college together. Artemis returns to duty, only to subsequently fake her death so she can go undercover with Aqualad within Black Manta's organization, adopting the identity Tigress, and apparently help him complete his long-term mission. Artemis maintains the Tigress identity maintains it after being exposed.

==== Expanded members ====
The following members were added to the team after the series premiere at different times:

- Zatanna (voiced by Lacey Chabert) is the daughter of Justice League member Zatara. Zatanna is often annoyed by her father's overprotectiveness, but is devastated when he sacrifices himself to become the new Doctor Fate. In the aftermath, Zatanna permanently moves into Mount Justice and becomes an official member of the team. In the fourth season, Zatanna frees Zatara from Nabu's control by convincing Nabu to rotate between her and other hosts. Designation: B08, later 25.
- Red Arrow / Speedy / Will Harper / Roy Harper (voiced by Crispin Freeman) is an archer and Green Arrow's sidekick. In the episode "Auld Acquaintance", Roy is revealed to be a clone of the original Roy, who was imprisoned by Cadmus. Roy and Cheshire recover the real Roy and return him to the United States. In the third season, Roy has changed his name to Will and has started his own private security company, Bowhunter Security. He resides in Star City and lives with Artemis, who helps him to take care of his daughter, Lian. Designation: B06, later 21.
- Rocket / Raquel Ervin (voiced by Kali Troy in the first and second seasons, Denise Boutte in the third and fourth seasons) is the apprentice of the superhero Icon. She uses a piece of alien technology called an inertia belt, allowing her to store and manipulate kinetic energy. She generally uses this to fly and grant herself some super-strength and a personal force field. In the second and third seasons, Rocket marries Noble Davis, with whom she has a son named Amistad. Designation: B09, later 26.
- Aquagirl / Tula (voiced by Cree Summer) is a student at Atlantis's Conservatory of Sorcery and Kaldur's former love interest. is a student at Atlantis's Conservatory of Sorcery and Kaldur's former love interest. When Kaldur began spending more time on the surface world, Tula entered into a relationship with Garth. She joined the Team during the five years in between Seasons 1 and 2, but died on a mission which left Aqualad devastated. The events surrounding Aquagirl's death were expanded on in the video game Young Justice: Legacy. Designation: B11.
- Oracle / Batgirl / Barbara Gordon (voiced by Alyson Stoner) is a classmate of Dick Grayson who became Batgirl during the time skip in between the first and second seasons. Between the second and third seasons, she was accidentally paralyzed by Orphan and assumed the Oracle identity. Designation: B16.
- Bumblebee / Karen Beecher (voiced by Masasa Moyo) is a young scientist and girlfriend of Mal Duncan. She and Mal were classmates of Superboy and Miss Martian at Happy Harbor High School. Her suit acts as armor and enables her to fly and shrink to microscopic sizes. In the third season, Karen and Mal marry and have a daughter named Rhea. Designation: B17, later E06.
- Guardian / Mal Duncan (voiced by Kevin Michael Richardson) is the boyfriend of Karen Beecher and classmate of Superboy and Miss Martian at Happy Harbor High School. Sometime between the first and second seasons, he joins the Team as a mission coordinator. In the episode "Cornered", Mal dons the Guardian armor to battle Despero while the rest of the Team is incapacitated. In the third season, Mal and Karen marry and leave the League. Designation: B24.
- Aquaman / Lagoon Boy / La'gaan (voiced by Yuri Lowenthal) is a student at Atlantis' Conservatory of Sorcery who joined the Team in between the first and second seasons. In the fourth season, he is revealed to be in a three-way polyamorous relationship and assumes the Aquaman mantle alongside Kaldur and Orin. Designation: B18, later 45.
- Arsenal / Speedy / Roy Harper (voiced by Crispin Freeman) is the original Roy Harper, who was previously captured by the Light, cloned, and had his right arm cut off to serve as genetic material. The original Roy was found in Tibet by his clone counterpart and Cheshire. After recovery in "Satisfaction", Roy learns the whole truth behind the events of the first two Seasons and recalls of dealing with Luthor in his last mission, prompting him to take vengeance. Although Roy almost succeeds, Lex anticipated this and outnumbers him. In exchange for his life, Lex gives Roy a prosthetic arm. Designation: B25.
- Tempest / Garth (voiced by Yuri Lowenthal) is Aqualad's best friend and a student at Atlantis's Conservatory of Sorcery. He joined and left the Team during the time between the first and second seasons. In the third season, Garth becomes an ambassador for Atlantis at the United Nations. Designation: B10, later E03.
- Troia / Donna Troy (voiced by Grey DeLisle) is a former protégé of Wonder Woman who joined and left the Team between the events of the first two seasons. In the third season, Donna becomes an ambassador for Themyscira at the United Nations and is elected to replace Lex Luthor as Secretary-General of the United Nations after he is forced to resign. Designation: B12.
- Arrowette / Cissie King-Jones (voiced by Kelly Stables) is an archer and a member of the Team and Batman Inc. Designation: B27, later Z08.
- Spoiler / Stephanie Brown (voiced by Mae Whitman) is a member of the Team and Batman Inc., as well as the daughter of the supervillain Cluemaster. Designation: B28, later Z09.
- Halo / Gabrielle Daou / Violet Harper (voiced by Zehra Fazal) is a Quraci refugee who was nearly buried by thugs, believing them to be dead, before they suddenly resurrect themselves. They are rescued by Tigress, joining the Outsiders as a result. Later on, it is revealed that Halo's real name is Gabrielle Daou and that they are a refugee who used to work for Markovia's royal family. They were captured by a metahuman trafficking ring and killed after testing negative for a meta-gene, then buried alongside a Mother Box, which resurrected and possessed them. Halo has rainbow-themed abilities, including the ability to resurrect herself and access the Source and the Anti-Life Equation. Halo officially comes out as non-binary later in Season 4 and enters a relationship with Harper Row. Designation: G03, later B31.
- Orphan / Cassandra Wu-San is the daughter of Lady Shiva, and a former member of the League of Shadows, now a sword-wielding member of Batman's vigilante movement via Robin. Trained by her mother to be the ultimate assassin, Lady Shiva forbade her daughter to learn to read and had Cassandra's vocal cords severed when she was an infant to prevent her from speaking. Designation: Z10, later B36.
- Mist / Andie Murphy (voiced by Daniela Bobadilla) is a metahuman who can turn into living vapor. She was part of a squad of trafficked metahumans, alongside Livewire and Shade, before being apprehended and sent to the Metahuman Youth Center to reform. Designation: B37.

=== The Outsiders ===
The Outsiders are a group of teen superheroes that work as part of the Team but in the limelight.

- Garfield Logan / Beast Boy (voiced by Logan Grove in the first two seasons, Greg Cipes in the third season onward) is a civilian and the son of Marie Logan, who previously portrayed the eponymous character in Hello, Megan!. After Garfield is injured in an attack on Marie's farm, Miss Martian gives him a blood transfusion to save his life, which gives him the ability to transform into animals and turns his skin and eyes green. Garfield later enters a relationship with Queen Perdita of Vlatava and joins the Doom Patrol, but leaves after most of the group's members are killed during a mission. In Season 4, Beast Boy becomes severely depressed due to his previous losses and Superboy's apparent death, causing him to break up with Perdita. He eventually agrees to receive therapy and is given a therapy dog named Wingman. Designation: B19, later D01.
- Blue Beetle / Jaime Reyes (voiced by Eric Lopez) is a teenager from El Paso, Texas who bonded with a Reach scarab following the death of its original owner, Ted Kord. The scarab is bonded to Jaime's spine and can generate multi-purpose armor and weaponry. Jaime frequently ignores the scarab's advice, as it is often aimed at violent solutions to problems. Designation: B22, later D03.
- Geo-Force / Brion Markov (voiced by Troy Baker) is the prince of Markovia and the younger brother of crown prince Gregor. He allows Helga Jace to give him earth-manipulating superpowers to battle metahuman trafficking and find his sister Tara. Brion becomes a member of the Team, but leaves in favor to join the Outsiders. By the end of the third season, Brion is manipulated into overthrowing Gregor, killing his uncle Baron Bedlam, and becoming king of Markovia. Designation: G02, later B30.
- Kid Flash / Impulse / Bart Allen (voiced by Jason Marsden) is a speedster from the future who is the grandson of the current Flash (Barry Allen). Bart is stern and determined to alter history to prevent the post-apocalyptic future from which he comes, but puts on a front as a cheerful and talkative youth. Bart assumes the mantle of Kid Flash following Wally West's death. Designation: B23, later D04.
- Static / Virgil Hawkins (voiced by Bryton James) is a teenager from Dakota City who gained electromagnetic powers from Reach experimentation. He joins the Team in the episode "Endgame". Designation: B26, later D05.
- Wonder Girl / Cassie Sandsmark (voiced by Mae Whitman) is Wonder Woman's sidekick. She joined the team sometime between the events of the first and second seasons. She is energetic and often impulsive, but a talented fighter. Cassie and Tim Drake later enter a relationship following Wally West's death. Designation: B21.
- El Dorado (voiced by Freddy Rodriguez) is the son of Eduardo Dorado Sr., who was captured and experimented on by the Light and Reach, giving him teleportation abilities. He was rescued by the Team before being transferred to S.T.A.R. Labs in Taos, New Mexico, later joining the Outsiders in the third season. Greg Weisman has confirmed that Ed is gay, but is not allowed to state exactly who he is dating. Designation: D07.
- Cyborg / Victor Stone (voiced by Zeno Robinson) is a high school student and football star who was caught in an explosion during an argument with his father, Dr. Silas Stone, and was fused with a Father Box to save his life. The Father Box threatens to overtake Victor until he is brought to Metron's Mobius Chair, which cleanses him of the Box's influence. In the fourth season, Cyborg joins the Justice League. Designation: G08, later 39.
- Forager / Fred Bugg (voiced by Jason Spisak) is a young insect-like alien from New Genesis who calls the Team for help in investigating attacks on his people's hives, but is banished for doing so. He is granted asylum on Earth by M'gann, where he later joins the Outsiders., Forager uses a glamour charm to assume the human identity of Fred Bugg and attend high school in Happy Harbor. Designation: G06, later B32 and D10.
- Terra / Tara Markov (voiced by Tara Strong) is a Markovian princess and the sister of Prince Gregor and Brion who disappeared two years before the events of the third season. Tara went on to join the League of Shadows and gain geokinetic powers. As part of Deathstroke's plan, Tara is "rescued" by the Outsiders and subsequently joins them so she can infiltrate them for the Light. However, she turns on Deathstroke after Tigress talks to her and reminds her of the kindness that the Outsiders showed her. Designation: G07, later B33 and D11.
- Stargirl / Courtney Whitmore (voiced by Whitney Moore) is the host of the web series Goode World Studios. She later becomes Stargirl, a hero who wields a Cosmic Staff, and joins the Outsiders between the third and fourth season. Designation: D13.
- Looker / Lia Briggs (voiced by Grey Griffin) is a telepathic Scottish metahuman who was captured by Klarion and rescued by the Outsiders, who she later joins. Designation: D16.
- Livewire / Leslie Willis (voiced by Britt Baron) is a metahuman with electrical powers and an adversary of Superman. While being controlled, she was apprehended by Nightwing's splinter Team, Black Lightning being the one to defeat her, and sent to the Metahuman Youth Center, where she is reformed. She later joins the Outsiders between the third and fourth seasons. Designation: D14.
- Robin / Tim Drake (voiced by Cameron Bowen) is the third person to adopt the Robin identity, after Dick Grayson (who has since become Nightwing), and Jason Todd (who is now deceased). By the events of the season finale, he is in a relationship with Wonder Girl. Two years later, Tim and Cassie are still dating, though he leaves the team with Spoiler and Arrowette in a pre-planned resignation to work independently with Batman. By the end of the season, he rejoins the Team, along with Arrowette and Spoiler. Designation: B20, later Z07 and D12.
- Windfall / Wendy Jones (voiced by Zehra Fazal) is an Australian metahuman who can manipulate wind. She initially struggles to control her powers, even wearing a collar to suppress them. Windfall later takes the collar off, having gained enough confidence in her powers to control them. Windfall later joins the Outsiders between the third and fourth seasons.

=== Sentinels of Magic ===
The Sentinels of Magic is a school of magic-based superheroes tutored by Zatanna who later become Nabu's hosts.

- Thirteen / Traci Thurston (voiced by Lauren Tom) is a member of the Team who specializes in bad luck and urban magic. She also has a pet iguana named Leroy. She is insecure and strives to prove herself as a hero and magician. Designation: B29.
- Doctor Fate / Khalid Nassour (voiced by Usman Ally) is one of Zatanna's protégés, who specializes in nature-based magic, and is Kent Nelson's nephew. He struggles with balancing between his magical prowess and medical education, but his Muslim faith and parental support allow him to forge his own path that gives him the chance to do both. He becomes the first new Doctor Fate in Nabu’s and Zatanna's new agreement to alternate the former's human host on a weekly basis. Later, he is shown to be a possible reserve member of the Justice League.
- Black Mary / Sergeant Marvel / Mary Bromfield (voiced by Erika Ishii) is one of Zatanna's protégés who specializes in the magic of Shazam. She is later corrupted by power and joins the Female Furies as Black Mary. Mary and Freddy Freeman (codenamed Lieutenant Marvel) were previously members of the Team in the time skip between the first and second seasons, with Greg Weisman confirming he had a story planned for them in the tie-in comics which was scrapped. Designation: B15.

== Recurring characters ==
=== Justice League ===
The Justice League is the superhero team that protects the Earth from various threats.

- Atom / Ray Palmer (voiced by Jason Marsden) is a superhero who can grow and shrink in size. He joined the Justice League in late 2010. Five years later, it is shown that Bumblebee has become his lab assistant. Designation: 18.
- Aquaman / King Orin / Arthur Curry (voiced by Phil LaMarr) is a founding member of the Justice League and the king of Atlantis. Aqualad served as his sidekick ever since he and Garth helped him defeat Ocean Master in the past. In the third season, Orin passes the mantle of Aquaman to Kaldur so he can focus all of his attention on ruling Atlantis. He is married to Mera, with whom he has one son. Designation: 06.
- Batman / Bruce Wayne (voiced by Bruce Greenwood) is a founding member of the Justice League and the leader of the group. In an interview at Comic Con, Greenwood differentiates the portrayal of the Caped Crusader in Young Justice: "He's younger, more of a father figure. He's tough, but not as broken (as in Greenwood's previous portrayal of the character in Batman: Under the Red Hood)." In the third season, Batman forms Batman Inc. to combat Lex Luthor's restrictions on the League. Designation: 02, later Z01.
- Batwoman / Kate Kane is a member of the Justice League and an associate of Batman. Though she joined in between the second and third seasons, she temporarily resigns alongside Batman, Green Arrow, and others in response to the United Nations' restrictions on the League. Designation: Z06.
- Black Canary / Dinah Lance (voiced by Vanessa Marshall) is the Team's therapist and trainer, who later becomes the chairperson of the League. Greg Weisman has said Black Canary's role on the show was in part because she is his favorite DC Comics character. Designation: 13.
- Black Lightning / Jefferson Pierce (voiced by Khary Payton) is a hero who can manipulate electricity and is initially a member of the Justice League. In the third season, he resigns from the League after accidentally killing a young metahuman on Rann and is convinced to join Nightwing's Outsiders. At the end of the season, Black Lightning accepts the chairmanship of the Justice League from Kaldur'ahm. Designation: 23, later G01.
- Blue Devil / Daniel Cassidy (voiced by Troy Baker) is a demon-like superhero who occasionally helps the Justice League, serving as the den mother of the Outsiders in the fourth season.
- Captain Atom / Nathaniel Adams (voiced by Michael T. Weiss) is a member of the Justice League and its former chairperson. At the end of the second season, Captain Atom passes Chairperson duties to Black Canary. Designation: 12.
- Shazam / Captain Marvel / Billy Batson (voiced by Rob Lowe in the first appearance, Chad Lowe in later episodes, Robert Ochoa as Billy Batson in the first two seasons, Eric Lopez as Billy Batson in the fourth season) is a member of the Justice League who served as the substitute den mother when Red Tornado was missing. Considered by IGN to be "the best superhero guest-voicing turn in some time. (Lowe) plays him like your goofy uncle (or little cousin?) who's trying way too hard to fit in with the cool kids. 'I'm really looking forward to hanging with you guys,' he blurts out with unabashed enthusiasm". Weisman notes that the character "will be an important recurring character in the series, so this could ultimately involve multiple episodes for Lowe." Designation: 15 (A05 as Billy Batson).
- Elongated Man (voiced by David Kaye) is a member of the Justice League with stretching abilities similar to Plastic Man's. He makes his first appearance in the third season as part of the group of Justice League members seeking to rescue the trafficked metahumans in space.
- Fire is a member of the Justice League who can generate mystical green fire.
- Flash / Barry Allen (voiced by George Eads in the first season and most episodes in the second, James Arnold Taylor in "Endgame" and third season) is a founding member of the Justice League. He is the uncle of Wally West, who served as his sidekick, and grandfather of Bart Allen. Designation: 04.
- Flash / Jay Garrick (voiced by Geoff Pierson) is the first Flash and a member of the Justice Society of America. He is initially retired, but joins the Justice League in the fourth season.
- Green Arrow / Oliver Queen (voiced by Alan Tudyk) is an archer and a member of the Justice League and Batman Inc. He had Speedy as a sidekick and later Artemis and Arrowette. Designation: 08, later Z02.
- Green Lantern / Guy Gardner (voiced by Troy Baker) is a Green Lantern who occasionally helps the Justice League. Designation: 24.
- Green Lantern / Hal Jordan (voiced by Dee Bradley Baker) is a founding member of the Justice League. Designation: 05.
- Green Lantern / John Stewart (voiced by Kevin Michael Richardson) is a Green Lantern and a member of the Justice League. Designation: 14.
- Hardware / Curtis Metcalf is a member of the Justice League and Batman Inc. who wields a high tech exo-suit. Designation: Z04.
- Hawkman / Katar Hol (voiced by James Arnold Taylor) is a member of the Justice League and husband of Hawkwoman. Designation: 09.
- Hawkwoman / Shayera Hol (voiced by Danica McKellar in the second season, Zehra Fazal in the third season) is a member of the Justice League and wife of Hawkman. Designation: 10.
- Ice / Tora Olafsdotter is a member of the Justice League with cryokinetic powers who is often seen with Fire.
- Icon / Augustus Freeman (voiced by Tony Todd) is an alien superhero and the mentor of Rocket. Designation: 20.
- Katana / Tatsu Yamashiro is a samurai-themed member of the Justice League and Batman Inc. who wields the Soultaker, a sword that can trap the spirits of anyone it kills. Designation: Z05.
- Martian Manhunter / J'onn J'onzz / John Jones (voiced by Kevin Michael Richardson) is a founding member of the Justice League and Miss Martian's uncle. Designation: 07.
- Metamorpho / Rex Mason (voiced by Fred Tatasciore) is a member of Batman's vigilante movement who can transform into any element. Designation: Z11.
- Plastic Man / Patrick "Eel" O'Brian is a superhero with elastic powers and a member of the Justice League and Batman Inc. Designation: 19, later Z03.
- Red Tornado / John Smith (voiced by Jeff Bennett) is a robot who was created by T. O. Morrow to infiltrate the Justice League, only to defect to them. Designation: 16.
- Steel / John Henry Irons (voiced by Zeno Robinson) is a member of the Justice League and an associate of Superman. Designation: 36.
- Superman / Kal-El / Clark Kent (voiced by Nolan North) is a founding member of the Justice League and Superboy's genetic donor. Designation: 01.
- Wonder Woman / Princess Diana / Diana Prince (voiced by Maggie Q) is a founding member of the Justice League and the princess of the Amazons. Designation: 03.
- Doctor Fate / Zatara / Giovanni Zatara (voiced by Nolan North) is a member of the Justice League and father of Zatanna who later becomes one of Nabu's hosts. Designation: 11 (as Zatara) and 17 (as Doctor Fate).

==== New Gods of New Genesis ====
- Forever People are a group of extraterrestrial superheroes from New Genesis. They can use their Mother Boxes to combine into Infinity-Man.
  - Vykin (voiced by Kevin Michael Richardson) is the leader of the Forever People with magnetic powers.
  - Big Bear (voiced by Bill Fagerbakke) is a member of the Forever People with super-strength.
  - Beautiful Dreamer (voiced by Grey DeLisle) is a member of the Forever People with psionic powers.
  - Serifan (voiced by Dee Bradley Baker) is a member of the Forever People. He is fond of Westerns and dresses like a cowboy.
  - Mark Moonrider is a member of the Forever People who can shoot bolts of energy from his hands.
- Orion (voiced by Benjamin Diskin) is a New God from New Genesis and Darkseid's son. He is claustrophobic and prone to rage, needing to be calmed down with a Mother Box.
- Highfather (voiced by Mark Rolston) is the ruler of New Genesis and Orion's adoptive father.
- Lightray / Solis (voiced by Nolan North) is a New God of New Genesis who can fly and leave trails of light.
- Green Lantern / Forager (voiced by Nika Futterman) is a female Bug from New Genesis who shares the same name as Forager. She later becomes a Green Lantern following Tomar-Re's death.

=== Villains ===
==== The Light ====
The Light are a secret society created by Vandal Savage in an attempt to improve humanity. They view the superheroes as interfering with the natural order of things and that Earth must employ survival of the fittest if it intends to exist and thrive in an ever-changing universe.

Among its members are:

- Vandal Savage (voiced by Miguel Ferrer in the first two seasons; David Kaye in later seasons following Ferrer's death) is the immortal founder and leader of the Light. Over the course of 15,000 years, Savage had gone by many names and conquered many lands for the sake of power. He convinced Klarion the Witch Boy to channel the latter's chaos power for the former's vision, and formed a partnership with Darkseid and Apokolips to conquer the entire galaxy before the two worlds battle each other for complete supremacy. His 'survival of the fittest' views are why he views the Justice League and other subsequent heroes as a constant obstacle for him and his colleagues. Despite this, he is willing to work with the heroes to defeat a third party (Light-partner or otherwise) if they potentially hinder his long-term plans. He was temporarily given the designation A04 near the end of the first season when the Justice League were mind controlled.
  - Cassandra Savage (voiced by Zehra Fazal) is one of Vandal Savage's daughters and current heir, a member of the League of Shadows. In the fourth season, she uses a glamour charm to fake having lost an eye and arm.
  - Olympia Savage (voiced by Jenifer Lewis) is one of Vandal Savage's daughters. When she started to become senile, Vandal was forced to mercy kill her by breaking her neck.
  - Arion's clone (voiced by David Kaye) is the clone of Vandal Savage's grandson, Arion, implanted with the memory engrams of Ocean-Master. He is killed by the Lords of Order when he tries to wield the real Arion's crown.
- Ra's al Ghul (voiced by Oded Fehr) is a member of the Light and leader of the League of Shadows who is an enemy of Batman. In the third season, the Team and the Outsiders encounter Ra's al Ghul on Infinity Island, who tells them he is no longer part of the Light or leading the League of Shadows. However, he secretly remains in contact with Vandal Savage.
  - Talia al Ghul (voiced by Zehra Fazal) is Ra's al Ghul's daughter and his second-in-command who has a love-hate relationship with Batman. In the third season, it is revealed she has a son, Damian Wayne. Fazal reprises the role from Batman: Death in the Family.
  - Sensei (voiced by Keone Young) is a high-ranking member of the League of Shadows. Unlike his comics counterpart, Sensei is not Ra's al Ghul's father.
  - Ubu (voiced by Fred Tatasciore) is a super-strong man and member of the League of Shadows who is loyal to Ra's al Ghul.
- Lex Luthor (voiced by Mark Rolston) is a member of the Light, Superman's archenemy, and Superboy's genetic donor. At the end of the second season, he is named Secretary General of the United Nations after helping the Team and the Justice League stop the Reach's plot. In the third season, Black Lightning, Cyborg, Superman, and Superboy expose Luthor's crimes, forcing him to resign from the United Nations. Despite this, he remained a member of the Light.
  - Mercy Graves is Lex Luthor's cybernetic bodyguard.
- Queen Bee (voiced by Marina Sirtis) is a member of the Light and the dictator of Bialya. She has the ability to mind-control most men and some women.
  - Onslaught are a team of metahuman enforcers who work for Queen Bee.
    - Psimon (voiced by Alan Tudyk) is the right-hand man of Queen Bee who has telepathic powers. In the third season, he and Devastation are romantically involved.
    - Devastation (voiced by Diane Delano) is a member of Onslaught and an enemy of Wonder Woman.
    - Mammoth is a teenage member of Onslaught and Shimmer's brother who derives his strength from Kobra-Venom. As a side effect, he sports a monstrous appearance with grey skin and exposed muscle.
    - Shimmer / Selinda Flinders is a martial artist and Mammoth's sister who possesses elemental transmutation abilities.
    - Icicle Jr. / Cameron Mahkent (voiced by Yuri Lowenthal) is a criminal with cryokinetic powers and Icicle Sr.'s son. Superboy befriends him while undercover in Belle Reve.
    - Terror Twins / Tommy (voiced by Yuri Lowenthal) and Tuppence Terror (voiced by Danica McKellar) are arrogant fraternal twins who possess super-strength and invulnerability.
    - Holocaust (voiced by Zeno Robinson) is a pyrokinetic metahuman who was part of an underground metahuman fight club secretly sponsored by Queen Bee.
    - Match (voiced by Nolan North) is a fully Kryptonian clone of Superman created by Project Cadmus to either replace or destroy him. Due to the difficulties involved in cloning Kryptonian DNA, Match becomes mentally unstable and is placed in cryogenic storage. In the Targets tie-in comic, Match is freed from storage, mutates into a Bizarro-like form, and joins Onslaught.
- Ocean Master / Prince Orm (voiced by Roger Craig Smith) is a member of the Light and Aquaman's half-brother. Sometime after the events of the first season, he was disgraced upon his identity being exposed to the authorities, incarcerated in Atlantis, and replaced with Black Manta on the Light. He returns in the third season operating on his own to kill the Justice League's families only to be killed himself by Lady Shiva to keep him from interfering in the Light's plans. However, the Light's Thrinos operation allowed them to make a clone of Ocean Master and insert the original's mind into a clone body of Arion that would be able to wear Arion's crown. The clone of Ocean Master is eventually cleared of mental programming by Miss Martian and allowed to go free by Aquaman.
- Brain (voiced by Nolan North in his first unofficial appearance, Corey Burton in the first official appearance) is a disembodied brain contained in a robotic body and a member of the Light. He is later captured by the Team and replaced by Ultra-Humanite.
  - Monsieur Mallah (vocal effects provided by Dee Bradley Baker) is Brain's gorilla sidekick. In the third season, he joins the Suicide Squad.
- Klarion the Witch Boy (voiced by Thom Adcox-Hernandez) is a Lord of Chaos and a member of the Light. Klarion met Vandal Savage 15,000 years prior and battled him over the course of 300 days. Klarion took an interest in Savage, resulting in them forming a partnership.
  - Teekl (vocal effects provided by Dee Bradley Baker) is Klarion's cat-like familiar, who can transform into a Smilodon-like form. In the fourth season, Teekl is killed by Flaw and Klarion transforms a normal cat to act as its replacement.
- Black Manta (voiced by Khary Payton) is Aquaman's archenemy, Aqualad's father, and an associate of the Light. He later joins the Suicide Squad.
- Slade Wilson / Deathstroke (voiced by Wentworth Miller in the first appearance, Fred Tatasciore in later appearances) is an assassin and the leader of the League of Shadows.
- Count Vertigo (voiced by Steve Blum) is a member of the royal family of Vlatava and an enemy of Green Arrow. Blum reprises his role from DC Showcase: Green Arrow.
  - Joe Henchy (voiced by Steve Blum) is Vertigo's brutish henchman. He was originally created for DC Showcase: Green Arrow.
- Sportsmaster / Lawrence Crock (voiced by Nick Chinlund) is a sports-themed agent of the Light. He is the ex-husband of Paula Crock, the father of Artemis and Cheshire, and grandfather of Lian Harper.
- Ultra-Humanite (vocal effects provided by Dee Bradley Baker in the first season; voiced by Greg Weisman in Outsiders) is an albino gorilla supervillain and a member of the Light and the Injustice League. In the tie-in comics, Ultra-Humanite is revealed to have been an old woman who transferred her brain into a gorilla body.
  - Helga Jace (voiced by Grey Griffin) is the personal physician to Markovia's royal family as well as an agent of Bedlam. After Prince Brion is banished from Markovia, the Outsiders allow Jace to watch over him. Jace later begins making contact with a mysterious individual (later revealed to be Ultra-Humanite) so she could study Halo further, as she sees her and the Markovs as her "children".
- Lady Shiva / Sandra Wu-San (voiced by Gwendoline Yeo) is the League of Shadows' teacher, an enforcer of the Light, and Orphan's mother.
- Zviad Baazovi (voiced by Yuri Lowenthal) is the ambassador of Markovia at the United Nations and replaced Granny Goodness on the Light's council. Baazovi possesses limited psychic abilities that allow him to bring out the worst impulses in others.

==== New Gods of Apokolips ====
- Darkseid (voiced by Michael-Leon Wooley) is the ruler of Apokolips and a longtime ally of Vandal Savage. During the events of Outsiders, Darkseid secretly moves against the Light to acquire the Anti-Life Equation so he can enslave the universe.
- DeSaad (voiced by Dee Bradley Baker) is a New God from Apokolips and a servant of Darkseid who supplies weapons to Intergang.
- Kalibak (voiced by Dee Bradley Baker) is Darkseid's eldest son.
- Grayven (voiced by Dee Bradley Baker) is another son of Darkseid.
- Granny Goodness / Gretchen Goode (voiced by Deborah Strang) is a New God from Apokolips who joins the Light in Season 3, replacing Black Manta. Goodness deduces Halo to be the cause of the Anti-Life Equation, which takes away free will, and has her captured, upstaging Vandal Savage and forcing him to sell Goodness out to the Team. She is defeated at the end of Outsiders thanks to Halo and Cyborg and is seen being tortured as punishment for her failure, while Zviad Baazovi replaces her on the Light. Despite this, she regains her former position after serving her punishment.
  - The Female Furies are Granny Goodness's elite strike force.
    - Big Barda (voiced by Grey Griffin) is the leader of the Female Furies.
    - Lashina is a member of the Female Furies who wields electric whips.
    - Gilotina is a member of the Female Furies who can slice through any material.
    - Supergirl is the daughter of Zor-El and cousin of Superman. She was imprisoned in the Phantom Zone before being freed by Darkseid and recruited into the Furies.
- Mantis (voiced by Andrew Kishino) is the former leader of the Bugs of New Genesis. He later sides with Darkseid and is assigned by Grayven to serve Lor-Zod.
- The Parademons are winged humanoids who serve as Darkseid's foot soldiers.

==== Phantom Zone Inmates ====
The following are inmates of the Phantom Zone:

- General Dru-Zod (voiced by Phil Morris) is the father of Lor-Zod and enemy of Superman who is trapped in the Phantom Zone with Superboy and Phantom Girl. He tried to conquer the galaxy in the Legion of-Super Heroes' time shortly after he was paroled from the Phantom Zone, but after he was re-imprisoned, Lor seeks to free him in the present.
- Ursa (voiced by Vanessa Marshall) is the wife of Dru-Zod and a fellow prisoner of the Phantom Zone, who joins him in escaping on Trombus. She later bonds with the Emerald Eye of Ekron, which Lor-Zod stole from Metron's vault.
- Faora (voiced by Denise Boutte) is an inmate of the Phantom Zone loyal to Dru-Zod.
- Non is an inmate of the Phantom Zone loyal to Dru-Zod.
- Jax-Ur (voiced by Andrew Kishino) is an inmate of the Phantom Zone loyal to Dru-Zod.
- Vor-Kil (voiced by Phil LaMarr) is an inmate of the Phantom Zone loyal to Dru-Zod.
- Kru-El (voiced by Nolan North) is an inmate of the Phantom Zone loyal to Dru-Zod.

==== Other ====
The following villains either operated on their own or have been used by The Light:

- Mr. Freeze / Victor Fries (voiced by Keith Szarabajka) is an enemy of Batman who wields a freeze gun and can only survive in cold temperatures.
- Killer Frost (voiced by Sarah Shahi) is a cryokinetic super-villain and inmate of Belle Reve.
- Captain Cold / Leonard Snart (voiced by Alan Tudyk) is a Flash villain and a thief who uses cryo-technology.
- Blockbuster / Mark Desmond (voiced by René Auberjonois, later Dee Bradley Baker following Auberjonois' death) is a scientist who works for Project Cadmus and the Light. He uses a formula he created that permanently transformed him into a monstrous blue form.
- T.O. Morrow (voiced by Jeff Bennett) is a scientist and operative of the Light who created Red Tornado, Red Torpedo, and Red Inferno. It is later revealed that the real T.O. Morrow was in a coma at an old age and that he built an android in his place, which is destroyed by Red Volcano.
  - Mister Twister (voiced by John de Lancie) is a scientist and Morrow's partner.
  - Red Inferno (voiced by Vanessa Marshall) is a robot who resembles Red Tornado, but has fire-based abilities. Tornado convinces her and Torpedo to aid the team against Red Volcano, during which they are destroyed.
  - Red Torpedo (voiced by Jeff Bennett) is a robot who resembles Red Tornado, but has water-based abilities. Tornado convinces him and Inferno to aid the team against Red Volcano, during which they are destroyed.
  - Red Volcano (voiced by Jeff Bennett) is a robot who resembles Red Tornado, but has volcanic-based abilities. He is destroyed in his first appearance before Lex Luthor rebuilds him in the second season.
- Daniel Brickwell / Brick (voiced by Khary Payton) is a super-strong criminal from Star City and an enemy of Green Arrow. He later joins the Suicide Squad.
- Bane (voiced by Danny Trejo) is a Hispanic supervillain and an enemy of Batman who uses the super-steroid Venom to increase his strength. He is the ruler of the island nation Santa Prisca, where he heads a Venom-manufacturing factory. In the third season, it is revealed that Bane is no longer dependent on Venom, viewing it as a crutch.
- Kobra (voiced by Arnold Vosloo) is the leader of a self-titled cult and an ally of the Light. In the companion comic "Uncommon Denominators," Kobra attempts to use his brother Jason as a sacrifice to become a half-man, half-cobra god, but he is stopped by the Team.
- Professor Ivo (voiced by Peter MacNicol) is a mad scientist and associate of the Light.
  - Amazo (voiced by Peter MacNicol) is a power-replicating android created by Ivo.
  - M.O.N.Q.I.s (vocal effects provided by Peter MacNicol) are monkey-like robots who serve Ivo. Their names are short for Mobile Optimal Neural Quotient Infiltrators.
- Cheshire (voiced by Kelly Hu) is a member of the League of Shadows, the sister of Artemis, and the daughter of Sportsmaster/Lawrence Crock and the Huntress/Paula Nguyen. Despite them being enemies, Cheshire is shown to have a soft spot for Artemis and refuses to harm her.
  - Lian Harper (voiced by Kelly Hu in the second season, Zehra Fazal in the third) is the daughter of Cheshire and Red Arrow. Designation: A28.
- League of Shadows are a group of assassins who are led by Ra's al Ghul and serve the Light. As of third season however, a majority of the League now serve Deathstroke after he became their new leader.
  - Black Spider (voiced by Josh Keaton) is a spider-themed assassin and member of the League of Shadows.
  - Hook is a hook-handed assassin.
  - Professor Ojo (voiced by Nolan North) is a scientist who wears a special helmet to see and shoot laser beams.
  - Rictus (voiced by Gwendoline Yeo) is a cybernetically enhanced assassin.
- Abra Kadabra (voiced by Jeff Bennett) is a faux magician and enemy of the Flash.
- Clayface / Harlan Matthews / Matt Hagen (voiced by Nolan North) is a shapeshifting supervillain made of clay. In the tie-in comics, it is revealed that Hagen was a member of the League of Shadows and was transformed into his current state after Talia al Ghul trapped him in a Lazarus Pit. In Outsiders, Clayface is placed under the control of Mad Hatter before being freed by Batman's team. The audio play "The Prize" reveals that Clayface, under the name "Harlan Matthews", reformed and was recruited to join Bowhunter Security.
- Icicle Sr. / Joar Mahkent (voiced by James Remar) is a criminal who uses cryokinetic technology and the father of Icicle Jr.
- Hugo Strange (voiced by Adrian Pasdar) is a prison psychiatrist at Belle Reve and an operative of the Light.
- Riddler (voiced by Dave Franco) is an enemy of Batman and an agent of the Light who specializes in riddles.
- The Injustice League are a small group of villains who were assembled to distract the Justice League from the Light's operations.
  - Atomic Skull is a S.T.A.R. Labs scientist turned supervillain and enemy of Superman.
  - Black Adam is an adversary of Captain Marvel.
  - Joker (voiced by Brent Spiner) is a sociopathic villain and Batman's archenemy.
  - Poison Ivy (voiced by Alyssa Milano) is an eco-terrorist and enemy of Batman who can manipulate plants.
  - Wotan (voiced by Bruce Greenwood) is an immortal Viking sorcerer and an adversary of Doctor Fate.
- Intergang is a crime syndicate that uses technology from Apokolips.
  - Bruno Mannheim (voiced by Kevin Michael Richardson) is the leader of Intergang.
  - Whisper A'Daire (voiced by Grey DeLisle) is a member of Intergang and Scorpia's sister.
  - Norman (voiced by Nolan North) is a member of Intergang.
  - Cairo DeFrey is a member of Intergang.
  - Scorpia A'Daire is a member of Intergang and Whisper's sister.
- Harm / Billy Hayes (voiced by Benjamin Diskin) is a sociopathic villain who killed his younger sister Greta to become Harm, a killer seeking the thrill of the hunt. Harm refers to himself in third-person and uses the impersonal pronoun to refer to others, objectifying them. The guilt of killing Greta eventually overcomes him when her ghost appears, causing the sword to reject him.
- Felix Faust (voiced by Dee Bradley Baker) is a powerful sorcerer and alchemist who was summoned by Klarion, along with other magicians, to split the world into two dimensions.
- Blackbriar Thorn (voiced by Kevin Michael Richardson) is a Welsh priest and druid.
- Wizard (voiced by Corey Burton) is a skilled magician dressed in Victorian fashion.
- Parasite (voiced by Adam Baldwin) is a supervillain who can drain energy and abilities via physical contact.
- The Kroloteans are an alien race who are skilled thieves and geneticists.
- Neutron (voiced by James Arnold Taylor) is a nuclear-powered supervillain who gained his abilities from Reach experimentation. In the year 2056, Neutron collaborates with Bart Allen so that the latter can travel back in time and alter the timeline, preventing the Reach from dominating Earth. While Bart succeeds in saving Barry Allen and removing the present-day Neutron's powers, the future Neutron learns that this did not significantly alter the future. In the third season, the present-day Neutron becomes a counseler at the Metahuman Youth Center.
- The Reach are an imperial race of aliens who created Blue Beetle's scarab.
  - Reach Ambassador (voiced by Phil LaMarr) is the ambassador of the Reach. He is a skilled actor, but he is also overconfident in his plans; believing them to be infallible.
  - Reach Scientist (voiced by Masasa Moyo) is the head scientist of the Reach. She experimented on young metahumans that were brought to them. Unlike the Ambassador, she is level-headed and sees when things will go in their favor.
  - Black Beetle (voiced by Kevin Grevioux) is a Reach warrior who wields a scarab similar to Blue Beetle. His scarab was destroyed by Blue Beetle during the final battle against the Reach.
- Despero is an intergalactic gladiator with telepathic powers.
  - L-Ron (voiced by Phil LaMarr) is Despero's robotic majordomo.
- Mongul (voiced by Keith David) is the ruler of Warworld and an ally of the Reach.
- Toyman / Winslow Schott (voiced by Cameron Bowen) is a criminal who uses toy-based devices in his crimes.
- Baron Bedlam / Frederick DeLamb (voiced by Nolan North) is the commander-in-chief of Markovia's security forces. He is the brother of Ilona DeLamb-Markov and brother-in-law of Viktor Markov. He ran a metahuman trafficking ring under the name Baron Bedlam.
  - Simon Ecks (voiced by Troy Baker) is a self-duplicating metahuman geneticist who works for Bedlam.
  - Jaculi is a Quraci speedster who Bedlam enlists to assassinate the royal family of Markovia.
  - Plasma / Ana Von Furth (voiced by Grey Griffin) is a 14-year-old girl who was transformed into a fiery golem-like creature after having her metagene activated. Black Lightning accidentally kills Ana after overloading her heart.
  - Plasmus / Otto Von Furth (voiced by Yuri Lowenthal) is Ana's brother, who was similarly transformed and placed under Count Vertigo's control. Plasmus is freed from Vertigo's control by Black Lightning, only to be shot and killed by a civilian who believed him to be a monster.
- Ma'alefa'ak / M'comm M'orzz (voiced by Benjamin Diskin) is a villainous White Martian and the younger brother of Miss Martian. He calls himself Ma'alefa'ak in reference to a feared Martian creature and seeks to alleviate the racism faced by White Martians. Ma'alefa'ak joins the Zods in trying to conquer Earth, but is overpowered by Danny Chase and banished to the Phantom Zone. Ma'alefa'ak is later freed from the Phantom Zone and given the planet Durla to settle the White Martians on.
  - K'omm B'lanxx (voiced by Troy Baker) is a White Martian who is allied with Ma'alefa'ak.
- Mad Hatter / Jervis Tetch (voiced by Dwight Schultz) is a scientist and enemy of Batman who specializes in mind control devices.
- Shade (voiced by Joel Swetow) is a supervillain who can manipulate shadows. In the fourth season, Shade joins the League of Shadows, but leaves them as a favor to Cheshire, who convinced him to leave Simon Stagg's metahuman trafficking operation.
- Doctor Moon (voiced by Vic Chao) is an underworld physician who treats supervillains.
- Child (voiced by Erika Ishii) is a Lord of Chaos and a rival of Klarion.
  - Flaw is Child's golem-like familiar.
- Lor-Zod (voiced by Phil Morris) is the son of General Zod. He was born in the 31st century and sought revenge against the Legion of Super-Heroes forimprisoning his parents to the Phantom Zone. He targets the Legion's inspiration, Superboy, to prevent the Legion from existing. After apparently killing Superboy, Lor-Zod decides to free his parents and followers early in the past and began his search for the Phantom Zone projector, discovering it was in Metron's vault. Traveling to the 31st century, Lor-Zod joins the past version of his parents in attempting to conquer Earth, but is foiled by the Team and forced to flee in a Time Sphere. The Time Sphere, having been reprogrammed by Metron, sends Lor-Zod back in time to be killed in an explosion on Mars.

== Supporting characters ==
=== Introduced in the first season ===
- Dubbilex (voiced by Phil LaMarr) is a genomorph created by Project Cadmus who possesses telekinesis and telepathy. Unable to leave Cadmus, Dubbilex takes the other genomorphs to a secret city deep under Cadmus called Genomorph City. After the Light discovers Genomorph City, Dubbilex establishes an above-ground city called Geranium City, where the genomorphs can live in secrecy. Designation: E18.
- Guardian / Jim Harper (voiced by Crispin Freeman) is a clone of Roy Harper who initially works as the head of security at Project Cadmus and is made to believe that he is Roy's uncle. When Mark Desmond is defeated, Guardian is appointed as the new head of Cadmus by the Light. Five years later, Jim abandons the Guardian alias and joins Bowhunter Security. Designation: G05, later A45 and E16.
- Amanda Spence (voiced by Vanessa Marshall) is a scientist employed by Project Cadmus.
- Charlie Daggett (voiced by Kevin Michael Richardson) is the driver of a school bus that Superman and Superboy saved, which Klarion possesses following Teekl's death.
- Serling Roquette (voiced by Tara Strong) is a scientist working at Royal University in Star City and creator of the Fog, a dangerous nanotechnology weapon.
- Madame Xanadu (voiced by Cree Summer) is a former con artist turned seer in New Orleans. She is later shown to be a possible reserve member of the Justice League.
- Kent Nelson (voiced by Ed Asner) is a retired superhero, the first Doctor Fate, and a member of the Justice Society of America. During Wally's fight with Klarion, Nelson is killed and his spirits moves to the Helm of Fate. After Wally dons the Helm and defeats Klarion, Nelson offers to stay with Nabu until he can find a permanent host. This lasts until Nabu forcibly expels Nelson into the afterlife.
- Nabu (voiced by Kevin Michael Richardson) is an ancient metahuman and the son of Vandal Savage. He was transformed into a Lord of Order after being killed in battle with Starro, becoming the source of power for the Helmet of Fate.
- Alfred Pennyworth (voiced by Jeff Bennett) is Bruce Wayne's butler and father figure.
- Mary West (voiced by Cree Summer) and Rudy West (voiced by Steve Blum) are Wally West's parents.
- Iris West (voiced by Nicole Dubuc) is Barry Allen's wife and a reporter for GBS. She later discovers from Bart that she is pregnant with his father and aunt, twins Don and Dawn Allen.
- Joan Garrick (voiced by Kath Soucie) is Jay Garrick's wife and Bart Allen's foster mother. She dies from an unspecified illness in the third season.
- Cat Grant (voiced by Masasa Moyo) is a reporter who frequently reports on the various matters concerning the Justice League and their enemies.
- Mera (voiced by Kath Soucie) is Aquaman's wife and the queen of Atlantis. In the fourth season, she fulfills a prophecy to become the high king of all the underwater kingdoms, allowing Orin to become Aquaman again, and now wears Arion's crown.
- Lori Lemaris (voiced by Kath Soucie) is a mermaid and student at the Atlantean Conservatory of Sorcery.
- Nuidis Vulko (voiced by Jeff Bennett) is the chief scientific advisor of Atlantis and head of the Atlantean Science Center.
- Topo (voiced by James Arnold Taylor) is an octopus-like inhabitant of Atlantis.
- Paula Nguyen (voiced by Kelly Hu) is a former villain and the mother of Cheshire and Artemis.
- Uncle Dudley (voiced by Corey Burton) is Billy Batson's legal guardian.
- Wolf (vocal effects provided by Dee Bradley Baker) is a Venom-enhanced wolf who Superboy adopts following the Team's fight with Brain in India. Designation: C02.
- Sphere is a machine from New Genesis who can transform into assorted machinery, including a motorcycle dubbed the Super Cycle. Designation: C01.
- Marvin White (voiced by Nolan North) is a student at Happy Harbor High School.
- Wendy Harris (voiced by Masasa Moyo) is a student at Happy Harbor High School.
- Snapper Carr (voiced by Greg Weisman) is a teacher at Happy Harbor High School. He is later shown to have married a police officer named Bethany Lee and adopted Harper and Cullen Row between the third and fourth seasons.
- Amanda Waller (voiced by Sheryl Lee Ralph) is the warden of Belle Reve. Waller is later replaced as warden by Hugo Strange and establishes the Suicide Squad to operate outside of Belle Reve.
- Bette Kane (voiced by Alyson Stoner) is a friend of Dick Grayson, Barbara Gordon, and Artemis who was a student at Gotham Academy.
- Marie Logan (voiced by Danica McKellar) was the mother of Garfield Logan and a wildlife preservationist who ran a wildlife reserve on the border of Bialya and Qurac. She once starred in a television show called Hello, Megan!, which inspired Miss Martian's human disguise and catchphrase. In between the first and second seasons, Queen Bee kills Marie as revenge against Miss Martian.
- General Wade Eiling (voiced by Jeff Bennett) is a high-ranking general.
- Jason Bard (voiced by Jeff Bennett) is a US Marine under General Eiling. In the fourth season, he leaves the military, becomes a detective, and enters a relationship with Artemis.
- James Gordon (voiced by Corey Burton) is the police commissioner of the Gotham City Police Department, the father of Barbara Gordon, and an ally of Batman.
- Secret / Greta Hayes (voiced by Masasa Moyo) is Harm's younger sister, who he killed to claim the Sword of Beowulf. She remains on Earth as a ghost until Billy is defeated, enabling her to pass on.
- Perdita Vladek (voiced by Ariel Winter in the first season and Hynden Walch in the third season) is a young member of the royal family and the Queen of Vlatava. She later enters a relationship with Beast Boy before breaking up with him. Perdita was originally created for DC Showcase: Green Arrow, with Winter reprising the role.
- Rumaan Harjavti (voiced by Bruce Greenwood) is the president of Qurac. He is later assassinated and succeeded by his brother Sumaan.
- Noor Harjavti (voiced by Vanessa Marshall) is Rumaan Harjavti's daughter.
- Jack Haly (voiced by Stephen Root) is the owner and ringmaster of a self-titled circus, which Dick Grayson worked for in his youth.
- King Faraday (voiced by Clancy Brown) is an Interpol agent.

=== Introduced in Season Two ===
- Lobo (voiced by David Sobolov) is an intergalactic bounty hunter.
- G. Gordon Godfrey (voiced by Tim Curry in the second season, James Arnold Taylor in the third season) is a political commentator on GBS with an anti-alien agenda.
- Catherine Cobert (voiced by Stephanie Lemelin) is a public relations liaison for the Justice League.
- Adam Strange (voiced by Michael Trucco) is a S.T.A.R. Labs scientist who maintains the Justice League's Zeta Beam technology.
- Sardath (voiced by W. Morgan Sheppard) is a Rannian scientist and friend of Adam Strange.
  - Alanna (voiced by Jacqueline Obradors) is Sardath's daughter and Adam Strange's girlfriend.
- Blue Beetle / Ted Kord is the second Blue Beetle after Dan Garrett but before Jaime Reyes. Unlike his mentor, Kord did not bond with the scarab and developed his own weapons to fight crime. Additionally, he was a member of the Justice League during the event between seasons one and two. Kord was killed trying to stop Sportsmaster and Deathstroke from claiming the scarab, which ended up in Jaime Reyes' possession. Designation: 22
- Tye Longshadow (voiced by Gregg Rainwater) is a friend of Jaime Reyes who ran away after being abused by his mother's boyfriend Maurice Bodaway. Tye is captured by agents of the Light and given to the Reach for experimentation. He is rescued by the Team before being transferred to S.T.A.R. Labs in Taos, New Mexico. Tye eventually develops the ability to project an "astral" version of himself, which can grow several stories tall.
- Carol Ferris (voiced by Kari Wahlgren) is the head of Ferris Aircraft.
  - Thomas Kalmaku (voiced by Kevin Michael Richardson) is a technician at Ferris Aircraft.
- Eduardo Dorado Sr. (voiced by Bruce Greenwood) is a scientist who is the father of Eduardo Dorado, Jr. In the third season, he founds the Metahuman Youth Center to help youths who were kidnapped for their metagenes acclimate to their powers, with his son serving as a counselor.
- Asami "Sam" Koizumi (voiced by Janice Kawaye) is a Japanese runaway until she was captured by agents of the Light and handed over to the Reach for experimentation. She was rescued by the Team before she was transferred to S.T.A.R. Labs in Taos, New Mexico. Asami developed the ability to focus her chi, which she can project outward to break through solid rock, leap at superhuman levels, and soften her landings.
- Green Beetle / B'arzz O'oomm (voiced by Phil LaMarr) is a Green Martian who became a servant of the Reach after being bonded to a scarab on Mars, similar to Jaime Reyes. He is assigned to gain the Team's trust by helping them defeat Black Beetle so that the Reach could get Blue Beetle's scarab back under their control. Blue Beetle and Green Beetle are freed from the Reach's influence by Zatanna, with B'arzz O'oomm returning to Mars.
- Jonathan and Martha Kent (respectively voiced by Mark Rolston and Zehra Fazal) are the adoptive parents of Superman and Superboy.
- Robin / Jason Todd (voiced by Josh Keaton) is the second person to adopt the Robin identity, after Dick Grayson (who has since become Nightwing). Sometime during the five-year lapse between Season 1 and Season 2, Jason joined the Team. He was killed by the Joker with Tim Drake becoming his successor as Robin. In the third season, it is revealed that Jason is alive, but has sustained amnesia and is working for Ra's al Ghul. Designation: B13.
- Blue Beetle / Dan Garrett is the first Blue Beetle, who discovered the scarab during an archaeological dig. He eventually passed it and the Blue Beetle mantle to Ted Kord.

=== Introduced in Season Three ===
- Gregor Markov (voiced by Crispin Freeman) is the prince of Markovia and the older sibling of Brion and Tara Markov. Brion overthrows and exiles Gregor at the end of the third season.
- Viktor Markov (voiced by Bruce Greenwood) and Ilon DeLamb-Markov (voiced by Vanessa Marshall) are the king and queen of Markovia. They are murdered by Jaculi shortly after announcing their intent to combat metahuman trafficking.
- Anissa Pierce (voiced by Masasa Moyo) is the daughter of Black Lightning.
- Jennifer Pierce is the daughter of Black Lightning.
- Lynn Stewart-Pierce (voiced by Denise Boutte) is the ex-wife of Black Lightning and John Stewart's sister.
- Sumaan Harjavti (voiced by Mark Rolston) is the brother of Rumaan Harjavti who succeeded him as the President of Qurac. After Bialya annexs Qurac, Sumaan becomes Bialya's ambassador to the United Nations.
- Kaizen Gamorra (voiced by Crispin Freeman) is the ambassador of Rhelasia at the United Nations.
- Wilhelm Vittings (voiced by Josh Keaton) is a Markovian who had shown displeasure with Markovia taking in Quraci refugees. In the fourth season, Vittings is accused of running an anti-metahuman movement.
- Silas Stone (voiced by Khary Payton) is a S.T.A.R. Labs scientist and Victor Stone's father.
- Simon Stagg is a businessman and CEO of Stagg Enterprises who ran a metahuman trafficking ring before he was foiled by the Justice League.
- Lois Lane (voiced by Grey Griffin) is a reporter for the Daily Planet, the wife of Superman, and Jon Kent's mother.
- Jon Kent (voiced by Grey Griffin) is the son of Superman and Lois Lane. In the fourth season, he is hinted to be developing Kryptonian powers.
- Don and Dawn Allen are the twin offspring of Barry Allen as well as the father and aunt of Bart Allen, respectively.
- Amistad Ervin (voiced by Khary Payton in the third season, Kurtis Mansfield in the fourth season) is the son of Rocket. In the fourth season, he is revealed to have autism.
- Traya Smith is the adopted daughter of Red Tornado.
- Cisco Ramon (voiced by Jacob Vargas) is a high school student and classmate of Victor Stone.
- Harper Row (voiced by Zehra Fazal) is a student at Happy Harbor High and a classmate of Violet and Forager. She is later adopted by Snapper Carr between seasons 3 and 4.
- Cullen Row (voiced by Benjamin Diskin) is the brother of Harper Row. He is later adopted by Snapper Carr between the third and fourth seasons.
- The Doom Patrol are a team of superheroes who adopted Garfield Logan after his mother was killed. Most of them, save for Mento and Robotman, were killed during a mission years prior.
  - Chief / Dr. Niles Caulder (voiced by Scott Menville) is the paraplegic leader of the Doom Patrol with genius-level intellect.
  - Mento / Steve Dayton (voiced by Scott Menville) is a member of the Doom Patrol with psionic abilities. He is Beast Boy's godfather and exploited his abilities for profit.
  - Elasti-Girl / Rita Farr (voiced by Hynden Walch) is a member of the Doom Patrol with size-changing abilities, Marie's best friend, and Gar's godmother. She adopted him after Marie was killed and helped him join the Doom Patrol.
  - Robotman / Cliff Steele (voiced by Khary Payton) is a member of the Doom Patrol whose brain was placed in a robotic body following his death.
  - Negative Woman / Valentina Vostok (voiced by Tara Strong) is a member of the Doom Patrol with a radioactive "soul-self".
- The Rocket Red Brigade are a group of armored superheroes operating in Russia.
  - Olga Illyich (voiced by Stephanie Lemelin) is the leader of the Rocket Red Brigade.
  - Dmitri Pushkin (voiced by Steve Blum) is a member of the Rocket Red Brigade.
- Suicide Squad are a team of Belle Reve prisoners who work for Amanda Waller in exchange for suspended sentences. Besides Black Manta, Monsieur Mallah, Brick, and Tuppence Terror, the following are members of the Suicide Squad:
  - Rick Flag is a field commander for the Suicide Squad.
  - Captain Boomerang / George "Digger" Harkness (voiced by Crispin Freeman) is a boomerang-wielding member of the Suicide Squad and an enemy of Flash.
- Angel O'Day (voiced by Danica McKellar) is a Los Angeles civilian.
- The Newsgirl Legion is a genderbent version of the Newsboy Legion whose members reside in Brooklyn, Maine and specialize in social media.
  - Tommi Thompkins (voiced by Mae Whitman) - Member of the Newsgirl Legion.
  - Gabi Gabrielle (voiced by Grey Griffin) - Member of the Newsgirl Legion.
  - Antonia "Big Words" Rodriguez (voiced by Zehra Fazal) - Member of the Newsgirl Legion.
- Thomas Thompkins (voiced by Jason Marsden) is the father of Tommi Thompkins and the Mayor of Brooklyn, Maine.
- Patrick Maguire (voiced by Troy Baker) is the sheriff of Brooklyn, Maine.
- Helena Sandsmark (voiced by Mae Whitman) is Cassie Sandsmark's mother.
- Casey Brinke (voiced by Tara Strong) is an EMT operating in Los Angeles.
- Metron (voiced by Phil LaMarr) is a New God who collects knowledge and maintains a vault in another dimension.
- Delphis (voiced by Tiya Sircar) is an aquatic metahuman who Kaldur takes to live in Atlantis due to her no longer being able to survive on land.
- Calvin Durham (voiced by Phil LaMarr) is a human with Atlantean abilities and Kaldur's foster father.
- Sha'lain'a (voiced by Tara Strong) is an Atlantean and Kaldur's mother.
- Wyynde (voiced by Robbie Daymond) is an Atlantean and Kaldur's boyfriend. Designation: E15.
- Infinity, Inc. are a group of teenage metahumans from Markovia who were established by Lex Luthor to serve the Light's needs. They later become Markovia's primary group of heroes following Luthor's ousting from the United Nations.
  - Trajectory (voiced by Zehra Fazal) is a teenage metahuman speedster.
  - Everyman (voiced by Nolan North) is a shapeshifting metahuman.
  - Fury (voiced by Quei Tann) is an African-American metahuman inspired by Greek mythology.
  - Kobold is a blue-skinned size-shifter.
  - Jet (voiced by Lauren Tom) is a young electromagnetic metahuman.
  - Lizard Johnny (voiced by Yuri Lowenthal) is a lizard-like metahuman.
- Tod Donner (voiced by Troy Baker) is an anchor working for GBS.
- John Economos (voiced by Brandon Vietti) is the warden of Belle Reve Penitentiary.

=== Introduced in Season Four ===
- The Legion of Super-Heroes are a team of superheroes from the future who have traveled back in time to save Superboy's life from an unknown enemy targeting him, later revealed to be Lor-Zod. They secretly followed Superboy, Miss Martian and Beast Boy during their trip to Mars for the wedding. They originally formed to confront General Zod in the future, but Lor-Zod's assassination attempt on Superboy was able to erase their future and replace it with one where Zod ruled the galaxy, with only Saturn Girl, Phantom Girl, and Chameleon Boy left due to exposure to chroniton radiation protecting them from timeline changes.
  - Saturn Girl (voiced by Kari Wahlgren) is a Titanian member of the Legion who possesses telepathy. Wahlgren reprises the role from Legion of Super Heroes (2006).
  - Phantom Girl (voiced by Kari Wahlgren) is a Bgztlian member of the Legion who possesses intangibility.
  - Chameleon Boy (voiced by Dee Bradley Baker) is a Durlan, a shapeshifting reptilian alien, and a member of the Legion.
  - Brainiac 5 (voiced by Benjamin Diskin) is a Coluan android and a member of the Legion who possesses superhuman intelligence.
  - Lightning Lad is a Winathian member of the Legion who possesses electrokinesis.
- Martians are the inhabitants of the planet Mars, also known as M'arzz. There are three ethnicities, denoted by skin colour; Red (B'lahdenn), Green (G'arruun), and White (A'ashenn). The fourth color, yellow (Y'ellonn), is exclusive to Martian priests.
  - J'arlia J'axx (voiced by Zehra Fazal) is a Red Martian and the Queen regent of Mars.
  - J'emm J'axx (voiced by Phil LaMarr) is a Red Martian prince. An open-minded individual, J'emm believes that the Martian ways should be changed for the better good.
  - M'aat M'orzz (voiced by Carl Lumbly) is Miss Martian's father, a White Martian. Lumbly previously voiced Martian Manhunter in the DC Animated Universe.
  - J'ann M'orzz (voiced by Kari Wahlgren) is Miss Martian's mother, a Green Martian.
  - M'ree M'orzz / Em'ree J'onzz (voiced by Hynden Walch) is one of Miss Martian's ten sisters, a Green Martian. Her human guise is modeled after Rita Lee, a character from Hello, Megan!. Em'ree and M'gann have a strained relationship due to the former failing to protect her siblings from racism.
  - S'yraa S'mitt (voiced by Zehra Fazal) is a Green Martian sorcerer-priestess and J'emm's former love interest. She inadvertently killed King S'turnn J'axx after losing control of her magic and became a priest to redeem herself.
  - R'ess E'dda (voiced by Troy Baker) is a Green Martian and the Consul-General who opposes the idea of an alliance between Earth and Mars.
  - R'ohh K'arr (voiced by Nolan North) is a Green Martian and a leading M'Honterr.
  - K'arr M'angg (voiced by Dee Bradley Baker) is a White Martian with a scar over his left eye.
- Onyx Adams (voiced by Logan Browning) is a former member of the League of Shadows and Amazing-Man's granddaughter.
- Phantom Stranger (voiced by D. B. Woodside) is a mysterious mystical being who appeared to Vandal Savage to remind him the deal he made to Klarion millennia ago, and informs Zatanna that Klarion is needing to be saved. He is briefly mentioned as being considered a reserve member of the Justice League.
- Arion (voiced by David Kaye) is Vandal Savage's grandson and the ancestor of the Homo magi and Homo mermanus. The Light creates a clone of Arion who is later destroyed by the real Arion's crown.
- Etrigan the Demon (voiced by David Shaughnessy) is a demon who was bound to the human Jason Blood centuries prior. Both are later considered to become reserve members of the Justice League.
- The Green Lantern Corps are an intergalactic peacekeeping organization whose members wield power rings fueled by willpower.
  - Kilowog (voiced by Kevin Michael Richardson) is a veteran Green Lantern and trainer. Richardson reprises his role from Green Lantern: The Animated Series.
  - Tomar-Re (voiced by Dee Bradley Baker) is a bird-like Green Lantern from Sector 2813. He later sacrifices himself to save New Genesis from a Promethean giant, with his ring going to the female Forager.
  - Razer (voiced by Jason Spisak) is a former Red Lantern who renounced his ring and became a Blue Lantern. He later learns to use both rings at once before leaving to search for his lost love Aya. Spisak reprises his role from Green Lantern: The Animated Series.
  - Soranik Natu (voiced by Vanessa Marshall) is a Green Lantern who studies the Kaiser-Thrall and uncovers Danny Chase's identity.
  - Tomar-Tu (voiced by Dee Bradley Baker) is a Green Lantern and Tomar-Re's son.
- Danny Chase (voiced by Jason Marsden) is a telekinetic metahuman boy who was kidnapped and trafficked to Apokolips, where DeSaad extracted his brain and placed it in a robotic box. Danny is forced to serve Apokolips as the "Kaiser-Thrall" before the Team liberates him.

== Comic tie-in characters ==
- Selena Gonzalez is the CEO of Farano Enterprises, a company that once did business with Project Cadmus. She is later killed by the League of Shadows.
- Psycho-Pirate is a masked villain.
- Two-Face is a villain who faced off with Batman and Robin at least once.
- Perry White is the editor-in-chief of the Daily Planet.
- Jimmy Olsen is a photographer for the Daily Planet.
- Tony Zucco is a Gotham City crime boss who murdered Dick Grayson's immediate family. Dick helped apprehend Zucco during his first outing as Robin.
- Duk Trang is a retired Vietnamese general.
- Henry Yarrow is a lieutenant and friend of Nathaniel Adams who served alongside him during the Vietnam War.
- Peggy Eiling is Nathaniel Adams's daughter.
- Rako is a Cambodian assassin who wields a special ionized sword.
- Randall Eiling is an Air Force captain.
- Alec Rois is a former CIA agent and ally of Wade Eiling.
- Clement Lemar is a general and Nathaniel Adams' superior during the Vietnam War.
- Enos Polk is a sergeant and member of the Military Police during the Vietnam War.
- Kevin Blankly is a lieutenant and a prosecutor at Nathaniel Adams' trial.
- Shirley Mason is a major and doctor in the United States military.
- Lucius Fox is an employee at Wayne Enterprises.
- Blubber (voiced by Robbie Daymond) is a student at the Conservatory of Sorcery.
- King Nanaue Sha'ark (voiced by James Arnold Taylor) is the ruler of the city-state Nanauve and a student at the Conservatory of Sorcery.
- Ronal (voiced by Nolan North) is a student at the Conservatory of Sorcery and a purist, or one who believes that half-fish, half-human Atlanteans are impure and should be purged.
- Garn Daanuth (voiced by Robbie Daymond) is an Atlantean royal guard and purist.
- Jason Burr is an astronomer at Gotham City Observatory and Jeffrey Burr's brother.
- Gorilla Grodd is a Kobra Venom-enhanced gorilla.
  - Primat is a Kobra Venom-enhanced gorilla and Grodd's mate.
  - Simeon is Grodd and Primant's son.
- Solovar is a Kobra Venom-enhanced silverback gorilla.
  - Boka is a Kobra Venom-enhanced gorilla and Solovar's mate.
- Djuba is a Kobra Venom-enhanced red gorilla.
- The Collector of Worlds is an alien android who preserves a portion of doomed worlds.
- Ali is the bodyguard of the Harjavti family.
- Draaga is an alien who once challenged Superman to do battle.
- Kylstar is an alien commander determined to free his people from slavery.
  - Orb-One is Kylstar's assistant.
- Major Force is a nuclear-powered hero and an acquaintance of Captain Atom.
- Maxima is an alien warrior.
- Vartox is an alien warrior.
- Deadshot is a masked marksman who was hired by Queen Bee.
- Sylvester Pemberton is a newsman who operates from helicopter as "Sylvester the Skyman".
- Merlyn is a bow-wielding assassin.
- Metallo is a Kryptonite-powered cyborg who serves Lex Luthor.
- Lieutenant Marvel / Freddy Freeman is a recipient of the power of Shazam who joined and left the Team between the first and second season. Freddy makes a minor appearance in the final issue of the Targets miniseries. Designation: B14.
