= List of Young Justice episodes =

Young Justice is an American animated television series created by Greg Weisman and Brandon Vietti for Cartoon Network. The series follows the lives of teenaged heroes who are members of a covert operations team that takes orders from the Justice League. The series debuted on January 7, 2011, with a two-week reairing of the first two episodes, which originally aired as an hour-long special on November 26, 2010. Warner Bros. Animation announced the show's return in November 2016 after an extended hiatus since 2013; new episodes were released in 2019.

As of June 9, 2022, 98 episodes of Young Justice have been released, concluding the fourth season.

== Series overview ==
Season	Subtitle	Episodes		Originally released		
Season	Subtitle	Episodes		First released	Last released	Network
1	Young Justice	26		November 26, 2010	April 21, 2012	Cartoon Network
2	Invasion	20		April 28, 2012	March 16, 2013	Cartoon Network
3	Outsiders	26	13	January 4, 2019	January 25, 2019	DC Universe
3	Outsiders	26	13	July 2, 2019	August 27, 2019	DC Universe
4	Phantoms	26	13	October 16, 2021	December 30, 2021	HBO Max
4	Phantoms	26	13	March 31, 2022	June 9, 2022	HBO Max

== Episode list ==
=== Season 1 (2010–12) ===
No. overall	No. in season	Title	Directed by	Written by	Original release date	Prod. code	Viewers (millions)
1	1	"Independence Day"	Jay Oliva	Greg Weisman	November 26, 2010	101	2.55
Sidekicks Robin, Aqualad (Kaldur'ahm), Kid Flash, and Speedy are finally ready to join the Justice League as full-fledged members. However, they soon discover they are to be treated as "junior members." An enraged Speedy leaves, while the other three strike out on their own to investigate a mysterious fire at Project Cadmus. The trio soon discovers that Cadmus conceals a major conspiracy, and one of its goals is to create a clone of Superman for their own ends.
2	2	"Fireworks"	Sam Liu	Greg Weisman	November 26, 2010	102	2.55
Kid Flash, Robin, and Aqualad are captured by the Cadmus genomorph forces, which prepare to clone them and dispose of the originals. Their only hope is the Superman clone, "Superboy", who must choose between freedom and subservience to those who created him.
3	3	"Welcome to Happy Harbor"	Jay Oliva	Kevin Hopps	January 21, 2011	103	0.90
Under the false belief that Red Tornado is testing them, the group faces off against Mister Twister who is attacking Happy Harbor. It is revealed that the robot piloting the Mister Twister armor was controlled by Bromwell Stikk from an undisclosed location to test it out for T. O. Morrow.
4	4	"Dropzone"	Christopher Berkeley	Andrew R. Robinson	January 28, 2011	104	1.02
Despite lacking a clear leader, the Team is assigned its first mission by Batman. They later get caught in the middle of a war between Bane's gang and the Kobra cult (who are assisted by Cadmus' operative Sportsmaster) over the production of the drug Venom.
5	5	"Schooled"	Michael Chang	Nicole Dubuc	February 4, 2011	105	2.5
Superboy's nonexistent relationship with Superman takes its toll on him, as he ignores Black Canary's training and becomes more angry and irrational. Things get worse when the team faces Professor Ivo's Amazo, a threat which even taxed the Justice League.
6	6	"Infiltrator"	Jay Oliva	Jon Weisman	February 11, 2011	106	2.12
Speedy (now Red Arrow) rescues Serling Roquette from the League of Shadows who had kidnapped her and forced her to create the FOG, a deadly nano-weapon. Newcomer heroine Artemis Crock must prove herself to the team while protecting Roquette from the League of Shadows (a mission brought to them by Red Arrow) as she prepares to make a program to counter the F.O.G.
7	7	"Denial"	Michael Chang	Thomas Pugsley	February 18, 2011	107	1.1
The Team is sent to the Tower of Fate by Red Tornado to find Kent Nelson and prevent the helmet of Doctor Fate from falling into the hands of Abra Kadabra and Klarion the Witch Boy.
8	8	"Downtime"	Jay Oliva	Kevin Hopps	March 4, 2011	108	1.2
After a team mission goes badly, Aqualad returns to Atlantis to reconsider his role as team leader, or whether he should pursue personal interests. However, he soon discovers that there is no escaping his destiny.
9	9	"Bereft"	Michael Chang	Nicole Dubuc	March 11, 2011	109	0.7
The Team discover that they have forgotten the last six months of their lives, including each other and a final fateful mission in Bialya. The Team turns to Miss Martian to recover their memories, before it is too late for Superboy.
10	10	"Targets"	Christopher Berkeley	Andrew R. Robinson	September 16, 2011	110	1.33
While in Taipei, Red Arrow requests the aid of Aqualad to help him to prevent Cheshire from assassinating Lex Luthor, who is assisting in a peace effort between Northern and Southern Rhelasia. Superboy and Miss Martian (adopting the names Conner Kent and Megan Morse, respectively) begin their first day of school.
11	11	"Terrors"	Jay Oliva	Greg Weisman	September 23, 2011	111	1.74
After the fraternal Terror Twins are defeated and sent to Belle Reve, Batman has Superboy and Miss Martian disguise themselves as them to infiltrate Belle Reve.
12	12	"Homefront"	Michael Chang	Jon Weisman	September 30, 2011	112	1.55
Robin and Artemis find that Mount Justice itself has been attacked by two "relatives" of Red Tornado named Red Inferno and Red Torpedo. The two only members without any special abilities work together to save their teammates from the robotic duo.
13	13	"Alpha Male"	Jay Oliva	Thomas Pugsley	October 7, 2011	113	1.59
Batman sends the Team (and their replacement "den-mother" Captain Marvel) to India to investigate bizarre reports of armed animals attacking human beings, where they discover that Brain has been conducting experiments with the Venom drug.
14	14	"Revelation"	Michael Chang	Kevin Hopps	October 14, 2011	114	N/A
When monstrous plants attack major cities around the world, Batman assigns the Team a dangerous task: taking out the plants' masters, the Injustice League (consisting of the Joker, Atomic Skull, Poison Ivy, Ultra-Humanite, Count Vertigo, Black Adam, and Wotan). In the end, it is revealed that the League is a "fall guy" meant to prevent the heroes from discovering the involvement of the Light, a supervillain group consisting of Vandal Savage, Lex Luthor, Ra's al Ghul, Ocean Master, Brain, Klarion, and Queen Bee).
15	15	"Humanity"	Matt Youngberg	Greg Weisman	October 21, 2011	115	N/A
The Team and Zatanna are on the hunt for Red Tornado, determined to find out once and for all whether the robot was the mole.
16	16	"Failsafe"	Jay Oliva	Nicole Dubuc	November 4, 2011	116	N/A
During an alien invasion, the Team face the ultimate challenge when they are forced to replace the fallen Justice League. However, the Team later learns that the invasion was a mental training simulation containing an unwinnable scenario held by Martian Manhunter, and Miss Martian's powers caused them to forget that the experience was a simulation. Martian Manhunter reveals that his niece is probably the strongest psychic of all Martians; considerably stronger than he.
17	17	"Disordered"	Michael Chang	Andrew R. Robinson	November 11, 2011	117	N/A
Still traumatized by the training exercise that went wrong, the Team attempt to work through their feelings with Black Canary. Meanwhile, Superboy's pet Sphere comes to the attention of its former owners, the Forever People, and he works with them to stop Intergang and DeSaad.
18	18	"Secrets"	Jay Oliva	Peter David	November 18, 2011	118	N/A
Artemis and Zatanna go to Manhattan for a girls' night after learning that Superboy and Miss Martian are a couple. While out, they are chased by a dangerous psychopath named Harm, but receive unexpected help from the ghost of his sister Greta. Meanwhile, Wally, Megan, and Conner attend a Halloween party at school.
19	19	"Misplaced"	Michael Chang	Greg Weisman	March 3, 2012	119	N/A
When every adult on the planet disappears because of a spell cast by Klarion, Wizard, Wotan, Felix Faust, and Blackbriar Thorn, only the Team, Zatanna, and Captain Marvel are left to figure out what's going on.
20	20	"Coldhearted"	Victor Cook	Jon Weisman	March 10, 2012	120	N/A
On his sixteenth birthday, Kid Flash finally finds out about Superboy and Miss Martian being a couple, and is disappointed when he is tasked by Batman to deliver a heart transplant to ten-year-old Queen Perdita, who is next in line to inherit the throne of Vlatava, which stops her devious uncle from becoming regent. Meanwhile, the rest of the Team is sent to join the Justice League and destroy flying fortresses causing nationwide snowstorms. He later realizes that the mission itself was his best birthday gift.
21	21	"Image"	Jay Oliva	Nicole Dubuc	March 17, 2012	121	N/A
When the team returns to the Middle East on a mission to Qurac, Miss Martian must face her secrets... but will doing so save the team or destroy them?
22	22	"Agendas"	Michael Chang	Kevin Hopps	March 24, 2012	122	N/A
At the Watchtower, Superman, Batman, and Wonder Woman meet with the other members of the Justice League to discuss who they will recruit to expand its roster. Superboy returns to Project Cadmus to investigate a rumor by Lex Luthor that the secret genetics lab has created another Superman clone.
23	23	"Insecurity"	Jay Oliva	Peter David	March 31, 2012	123	N/A
Red Arrow joins the Team and embarks on a mission with Kid Flash, Aqualad, and Artemis to track down Sportsmaster, which results in them battling Cheshire, too. Artemis discovers that Professor Ivo, the Brain and Klarion are all working together doing something to a starfish creature.
24	24	"Performance"	Michael Chang	Jon Weisman	April 7, 2012	124	N/A
The Team go undercover at Haly's Circus to locate a thief stealing weapons technology across Europe, with King Faraday suspecting that Jack Haly's circus performers are responsible. As the circus moves location, the Team encounter the thief: Parasite. Meanwhile, Robin is distracted as he reflects on his family's death and the possibility of Haly losing the circus if the thief is not caught.
25	25	"Usual Suspects"	Jay Oliva & Tim Divar	Kevin Hopps	April 14, 2012	125	N/A
Red Arrow, Icon, Plastic Man, The Atom, and Doctor Fate are welcomed into the Justice League while Icon's protégée Rocket joins the Team. During the ceremony, the Team receives an alert about Cheshire boarding a plane. After finding the plane crashed, the group is attacked by the Riddler, Cheshire, Mammoth, and Shimmer. After winning the battle, the Team recovers a suitcase containing modified Starro-based technology, but the day's events do not end there.
26	26	"Auld Acquaintance"	Michael Chang & Lauren Montgomery	Greg Weisman	April 21, 2012	126	N/A
The Team learn the Justice League is brainwashed after Red Arrow tries to infect them with Starro biotech. After a fierce battle in the Watchtower, they succeed in saving them, and Savage and Klarion flee. Robin alerts some of the other heroes to the fact that six Justice League members (Batman, Hawkwoman, John Stewart, Martian Manhunter, Superman, and Wonder Woman) whereabouts for 16 hours while under Savage's control cannot be accounted for, leaving Batman asking the question of what they did during that time.

=== Season 2: Invasion (2012–13) ===
No. overall	No. in season	Title	Directed by	Written by	Original release date	Prod. code	Viewers (millions)
27	1	"Happy New Year"	Tim Divar	Greg Weisman	April 28, 2012	201	N/A
Five years on from the events of the first season, the intergalactic bounty hunter Lobo arrives on Earth and is confronted by Team members Batgirl and Wonder Girl, but his arrival is only the prelude to a greater threat.
28	2	"Earthlings"	Doug Murphy	Nicole Dubuc	May 5, 2012	202	N/A
Superboy, Miss Martian, and Beast Boy arrive on Rann with Adam Strange to halt the Krolotean invasion at its source. Following a battle, Miss Martian incapacitates a Krolotean and uncovers the truth about what the six Justice League members did during their missing 16 hours.
29	3	"Alienated"	Melchior Zwyer	Kevin Hopps	May 12, 2012	203	N/A
Members of both the Team and League investigate a Krolotean island, but are discovered and a fight ensues, during which the enemy is revealed to be Aqualad, who left the team in anger following the death of Tula. In addition, Aqualad learned his father is Black Manta. Aqualad eventually escapes, and a bomb planted by the enemy seemingly obliterates the island and most of the Kroloteans present. Meanwhile, the six Leaguers accused of attacking the planet Rimbor (Superman, Wonder Woman, Martian Manhunter, Batman, Hawkwoman, and John Stewart) leave Earth to resolve the dispute peacefully, accompanied by Hawkman and Icon.
30	4	"Salvage"	Tim Divar	Greg Weisman	May 19, 2012	204	N/A
Nightwing, Wally West, Jim Harper, Green Arrow, and Black Canary reach out to Red Arrow, who has fallen into despair over his failed quest to find the original Roy Harper. Meanwhile, Superboy and Blue Beetle go after Intergang leaders Bruno Mannheim and Whisper A'Daire. The criminals reanimate the Appellaxians into a golem which attacks a nuclear power plant. Meanwhile, Red Arrow returns home where Cheshire is waiting for him. They used to be happily married before his obsession drove them apart. Now she returns after acquiring a lead to the location of the original Roy.
31	5	"Beneath"	Doug Murphy	Brandon Vietti	May 26, 2012	205	N/A
Blue Beetle tries to intercept his friend, Tye, before he boards a bus, but the boy is abducted before Jaime can reach him. Meanwhile, Batgirl, Wonder Girl, Miss Martian and Bumblebee are en route to Bialya. The girls arrive in Bialya and learn that Psimon is active again. They discover a shipment of runaways who are being transported by a plane guarded by Psimon, Icicle Jr., Mammoth, Shimmer, and Devastation. Alpha Team rescue the abducted teens, but Queen Bee is content, since a second shipment, which includes Tye, has already been acquired.
32	6	"Bloodlines"	Melchior Zwyer	Peter David	June 2, 2012	206	N/A
A stranger appears in Mount Justice claiming to be the future grandson of Barry Allen. The boy, Bart Allen/Impulse, meets with the rest of the Flash family, but is interrupted when Neutron goes on a rampage. The Flash, Kid Flash, and Impulse defeat Neutron, and Impulse secretly administers a cure to remove his powers. Impulse comes from a post-apocalyptic future, and his one-way trip to the past does not seem to have changed it. Meanwhile, Red Arrow and Cheshire travel to a League of Shadows base in Tibet and find the original Roy Harper.
33	7	"Depths"	Tim Divar	Story by : Kevin Hopps; Teleplay by : Paul Giacoppo	June 9, 2012	207	N/A
Artemis rejoins the Team while Black Manta sends Aqualad and his men to destroy a communication satellite guarded by the heroes. A fight ensues in which the satellite gets destroyed and Artemis seems to be killed by Aqualad's sword. It later turns out that her "death", as well as Aqualad's defection from the Team, was fabricated to ensure that the pair could go undercover to learn all about the Light and their unknown partner. Artemis is given a mystic amulet made by Zatanna that will disguise her looks to all but Nightwing, Aqualad, and Wally.
34	8	"Satisfaction"	Doug Murphy	Greg Weisman	September 29, 2012	208	1.77
After recuperating in the hospital, Roy Harper seeks vengeance against Lex Luthor for his kidnapping during a failed stakeout on LexCorp. In exchange for his life, Luthor gives Roy a cybernetic arm to replace the one he lost. Green Arrow and Red Arrow arrive too late to avert the battle, and are informed by Roy that he wants to go by the name Arsenal from now on. Elsewhere, Rocket hosts a bridal shower which is interrupted by Captain Cold.
35	9	"Darkest"	Melchior Zwyer	Jon Weisman	October 6, 2012	209	1.98
Aqualad, Artemis, Icicle Jr., and the Terror Twins are sent by Black Manta to capture Blue Beetle, but they are thwarted due to Impulse's interference. However, Kaldur's tracking device (stolen by Impulse during the fight) remotely deactivates all security at the Cave, and Aqualad's team launches another attack.
36	10	"Before the Dawn"	Tim Divar	Kevin Hopps	January 5, 2013	210	1.77
Nightwing leads the Team on a mission to rescue its members from the Light's partner: an alien race known as the Reach. Aqualad (now officially affiliated with the Light) learns that teenagers have been abducted to test humanity's ability to develop superpowers naturally. Instinctively, Miss Martian destroys Aqualad's mind and learns that he had never been a traitor, but is guilty for being unable to help him.
37	11	"Cornered"	Doug Murphy	Nicole Dubuc	January 12, 2013	211	1.60
Despero, on the advice of his robotic majordomo L-Ron, sets his sights on Earth's champions. He attacks the Hall of Justice while the members of the Team who used to live at the Cave are at the Hall to remove their belongings. Mal Duncan becomes the new Guardian to help in the battle.
38	12	"True Colors"	Melchior Zwyer	Paul Giacoppo	January 19, 2013	212	1.98
Bumblebee and the Atom try to remove the Scarab from Jaime's back, but find that its defenses are too strong. Afterward, Robin, Blue Beetle, Impulse, and Arsenal are sent undercover to investigate LexCorp's new partnership with the Reach, crop additives being tested in Smallville. However, Arsenal blows their cover and they end up fighting Black Beetle. They meet Green Beetle and take him back to the Justice League.
39	13	"The Fix"	Tim Divar	Greg Weisman	January 26, 2013	213	1.94
Tigress intervenes before Psimon can enter Kaldur's mind and discover their secret; she drugs him, but he discovers her true identity before passing out. She persuades Black Manta that she ought to kidnap Miss Martian to force her to fix the damage she has done, and Manta sends Deathstroke to accompany her. Elsewhere, Jaime convinces Green Beetle to modify his Scarab and is ecstatic when he finds that the Scarab's voice has been silenced.
40	14	"Runaways"	Doug Murphy	Kevin Hopps	February 2, 2013	214	2.12
Four Reach abductees (consisting of Virgil Hawkins, Tye Longshadow, Asami Koizumi, and Eduardo Dorado Jr.) escape from the League's Taos base after being put through endless metagene training exercises. Nightwing sends Blue Beetle to track them down, and Jaime reveals his secret identity to them to get them on his side.
41	15	"War"	Melchior Zwyer	Jon Weisman	February 9, 2013	215	1.99
At the Justice League's trial on Rimbor, Vandal Savage manipulates Mongul into taking action against the Reach. The Justice League and Nightwing learn that something is fast approaching the Earth. As Green Beetle informs them that it is the weaponized planet satellite Warworld, the Reach makes contact with Mongul to persuade him to turn around, only for him to state that he is there because of them.
42	16	"Complications"	Tim Divar	Kevin Hopps	February 16, 2013	216	1.99
Nightwing arrives on Warworld to inquire about the Team's disappearance, but Blue Beetle covers his tracks by insisting that a Boom Tube opened which sucked in everyone except for himself. Meanwhile, Artemis, M'gann, and Aqualad are stalling for time to try to figure out how to save her life. Cheshire and Sportsmaster try to kill Aqualad and Black Manta to avenge Artemis. M'gann psionically shows them the truth she had unearthed, and they escape.
43	17	"The Hunt"	Doug Murphy	Brandon Vietti	February 23, 2013	217	1.99
Black Beetle laments the setbacks that the Reach have suffered, such as the loss of most of their fleet, while on another part of Warworld, Arsenal continues to flee from the Reach's forces. Lex Luthor encourages the runaways to rescue the Team from the Reach and provides them with a Father Box which transports them to Warworld.
44	18	"Intervention"	Melchior Zwyer	Peter David	March 2, 2013	218	2.05
With the help of Green Beetle, Black Beetle is able to defeat Mongul and imprison him again. They discover that the Warworld key has been stolen, while in Blüdhaven, the Team returns to base and realizes that they need to turn their attention to saving Blue Beetle.
45	19	"Summit"	Tim Divar	Greg Weisman	March 9, 2013	219	1.86
The Light calls a summit with the Reach to discuss how their plans are advancing. As the tensions between the two groups begin to come to the fore, Ra's al Ghul notices the glamor charm on Tigress's neck and exposes her as Artemis, leading Deathstroke to execute both her and Kaldur. However, a hologram of Aqualad then plays which reveals to the Reach the Light's manipulation, leaving their alliance in pieces. Aqualad and Artemis then return to the team to celebrate.
46	20	"Endgame"	Doug Murphy	Kevin Hopps	March 16, 2013	220	2.05
Superboy and Miss Martian arrive in time to prove the Justice League's innocence before the council of Rimbor. Following Black Beetle's defeat, twenty Reach devices damage the planet's magnetic field, causing various natural disasters. The superheroes destroy them with the help of Luthor, but the surprise of a twenty-first machine in the Arctic leads to the sacrifice of Kid Flash. Bart Allen/Impulse takes on Wally's role as Kid Flash and Artemis becomes Tigress full time. Meanwhile, Vandal Savage takes Warworld to Apokolips and meets with Darkseid.

=== Season 3: Outsiders (2019) ===
The first letter of each episode spells out a hidden phrase: "Prepare the Anti-Life Equation".

No. overall	No. in season	Title	Directed by	Written by	Original release date	Prod. code
Part 1
47	1	"Princes All"	Christopher Berkeley	Greg Weisman	January 4, 2019	301
48	2	"Royal We"	Mel Zwyer	Andrew Robinson	January 4, 2019	302
49	3	"Eminent Threat"	Christopher Berkeley	Brandon Vietti	January 4, 2019	303
50	4	"Private Security"	Vinton Hueck	Michael Vogel	January 11, 2019	304
51	5	"Away Mission"	Mel Zwyer	Nicole Dubuc	January 11, 2019	305
52	6	"Rescue Op"	Vinton Hueck	Joshua Hale Fialkov	January 11, 2019	306
53	7	"Evolution"	Christopher Berkeley	Brandon Vietti	January 18, 2019	307
54	8	"Triptych"	Mel Zwyer	Peter David	January 18, 2019	308
55	9	"Home Fires"	Vinton Heuck	Greg Weisman	January 18, 2019	309
56	10	"Exceptional Human Beings"	Christopher Berkeley	Francisco Paredes	January 25, 2019	310
57	11	"Another Freak"	Mel Zwyer	Mae Catt	January 25, 2019	311
58	12	"Nightmare Monkeys"	Vinton Heuck	Greg Weisman	January 25, 2019	312
59	13	"True Heroes"	Christopher Berkeley	Kevin Hopps	January 25, 2019	313
Part 2
60	14	"Influence"	Mel Zwyer	Brandon Vietti	July 2, 2019	314
61	15	"Leverage"	Vinton Heuck	Thomas Pugsley	July 2, 2019	315
62	16	"Illusion of Control"	Christopher Berkeley	Greg Weisman	July 2, 2019	316
63	17	"First Impression"	Mel Zwyer	Brandon Vietti	July 9, 2019	317
64	18	"Early Warning"	Vinton Heuck	Greg Weisman	July 16, 2019	318
65	19	"Elder Wisdom"	Christopher Berkeley	Paul Giacoppo	July 23, 2019	319
66	20	"Quiet Conversations"	Mel Zwyer	Greg Weisman	July 30, 2019	320
67	21	"Unknown Factors"	Vinton Heuck	Brandon Vietti	August 6, 2019	321
68	22	"Antisocial Pathologies"	Christopher Berkeley	Rich Fogel	August 13, 2019	322
69	23	"Terminus"	Mel Zwyer	Brandon Vietti	August 20, 2019	323
70	24	"Into the Breach"	Vinton Heuck	Jonathan Callan	August 27, 2019	324
71	25	"Overwhelmed"	Christopher Berkeley	Greg Weisman	August 27, 2019	325
72	26	"Nevermore"	Mel Zwyer	Jim Krieg & Jeremy Adams	August 27, 2019	326

=== Season 4: Phantoms (2021–22) ===
The first letter of each episode spells out a hidden phrase: "Invitation to Kneel Before Zod".

No. overall	No. in season	Title	Directed by	Written by	Original release date	Prod. code
Part 1
73	1	"Inhospitable"	Christopher Berkeley	Greg Weisman	October 16, 2021	401
One year after the events of Outsiders, M'gann, Conner, Garfield and J'onn J'onzz travel to Mars so M'gann and Conner can have a Martian wedding ceremony. Upon arrival, they find out the Red Martian king has been murdered, with the Green Martians and White Martians blaming each other. Despite many Martians not trusting Earthlings, the Martian Queen orders the construction of a Zeta Beam tube that will connect them with Earth. Just as M'gann's younger brother M'comm is captured, J'onn tests the Zeta tube when it explodes. In a mid-credits scene, Violet Harper talks with Black Canary about her feelings for Brion and her relationship with the Muslim faith.: Note: This episode is dedicated to the memory of W. Morgan Sheppard, the voice of Sardath, who died on January 6, 2019.
74	2	"Needful"	Vinton Heuck	Andrew Blanchette	October 16, 2021	402
J'onn confirms he made it to the Watchtower unharmed when the Mars communication satellite explodes. M'gann interrogates M'comm about the explosion which M'comm refuses to tell until he rebukes her for abandoning him. Conner and M'gann spend the day with M'gann's family and S'yrra, a Yellow Martian priestess. The three Legion heroes secretly following them are Saturn Girl, Phantom Girl, and Chameleon Boy. They look for their enemy, the actual man behind the recent attacks. DeSaad of Apokolips meets with M'comm and gives him a virus bomb capable of killing every non-White Martian on Mars. In a mid-credits scene, Garfield listens to a voicemail from Perdita.
75	3	"Volatile"	Christina Sotta	Brandon Vietti	October 21, 2021	403
M'gann's Bio-Ship has decided to retire on Mars and has an offspring named Baby to take care of the Team. Meanwhile, Garfield is haunted by visions of Brion, the Outsiders, and all the people he is afraid of losing. Someone who appears to be M'gann saves Garfield's mind (caused by the green Martians' psychic blast) and encourages him to seek help for his trauma before he is rescued. She is actually Saturn Girl, and her intervention was not part of the Legion's mission. In a mid-credits scene, Superman helps Lois Lane with their son Jon.
76	4	"Involuntary"	Christopher Berkeley	Francisco Paredes	October 28, 2021	404
As Prince J'emm's birthday celebration approaches, M'comm plants the virus bomb underneath the event arena. Meanwhile, M'gann, Conner, and Garfield find out S'yrra is the King's murderer. S'yrra confesses to J'emm that she accidentally killed him after he forbade her to marry J'emm because of the color of her skin, and her emotional outburst caused her to lose control of her powers: her arrest saddens J'emm, who swears to help Mars forbid its caste system. The bomb is discovered due to the Legion's enemy secretly adding kryptonite to it. Conner submerges it in lava, saving everyone, but the kryptonite seemingly kills him. In a mid-credits scene, M'gann weeps at the ceremonial altar where their wedding was set to take place.
77	5	"Tale of Two Sisters"	Vinton Heuck	Brian Hohlfeld	November 4, 2021	405
Artemis lives a happy, balanced life as a hero and civilian, until she hears of Conner's death and a woman named Onyx Adams appears. Onyx claims she defected from the League of Shadows to warn them Cassandra Savage is going to come to her and lie about switching sides. Cassandra, now missing half an arm and blind in one eye, arrives and says Onyx is the one lying. Artemis does not know whom to believe and decides to ask for help from her sister, Jade / Cheshire. In a mid-credits scene, Dick and Kaldur stand at Conner's memorial hologram while in narration, Artemis quotes A Tale of Two Cities.
78	6	"Artemis Through the Looking Glass"	Christina Sotta	Brandon Vietti	November 11, 2021	406
Jade agrees to help after learning that the Shadows know where Lian Harper lives. She starts interrogating Cassandra and Onyx, when the Shadows appear and capture Orphan. Lady Shiva threatens to kill her if Artemis does not turn over Cassandra. Orphan is actually Lady Shiva's daughter, and she used to be part of the Shadows before Batman took her in. Artemis, Onyx, and Cassandra agree to team up to rescue her, and Jade leaves. Meanwhile, a distraught Garfield returns to Earth, where he learns of Brion welcoming all metahumans to Markovia. In a mid-credits scene, a genomorph mourns Conner, while Artemis narrates quotes from Through the Looking-Glass.
79	7	"The Lady, or the Tigress?"	Christopher Berkeley	Nicole Dubuc	November 18, 2021	407
On Mars, M'gann confronts M'Comm for the gene bomb that killed Superboy and learns he is innocent before he flees to Apokolips, leaving her in deep and further despair over Conner's death. Back on Earth, a voice-over from Artemis narrates The Lady or the Tiger? as she, Cassandra Savage, and Onyx head to Santa Prisca. In flashbacks, Orphan goes on her first mission to kill the Joker. She almost does it, but Batgirl stops her and is paralyzed after Cassandra injures her spine. In the present, the team arrives in Santa Prisca, where Cassandra is revealed as the mole and her missing arm is based on a magical illusion. Cheshire turns up to help Artemis and Onyx and they find Orphan but are cornered by Lady Shiva and her fellow Shadows. Meanwhile, Em'ree decides to join M'gann and J'onn on their journey back to Earth. In a mid-credits scene as the three rides in silence, Artemis finishes her narration.
80	8	"I Know Why the Caged Cat Sings"	Vinton Heuck	Greg Weisman	November 25, 2021	408
It is revealed that Onyx was tricked into defecting to cause confusion among the team. After an escape attempt, Shade switches sides and helps the heroes escape, to repay an old debt to Cheshire, and announces his resignation to the League of Shadows. An enraged Shiva threatens Cassandra, causing them to fight. Cassandra gains the upper hand, but spares Shiva after remembering Barbara's injuries. Jade agrees to return to her family, but flees in panic at the last moment, feeling she is too much like her abusive father, Sportsmaster. The heroes travel to Infinity Island, where Sensei and Ra's al Ghul offer Jade and Onyx a chance at rehabilitation. At the Kent farm, Clark deals with his guilt over Conner's death. In a mid-credits scene, Artemis quotes I Know Why the Caged Bird Sings over photos of herself and Wally, and herself and Jade as children.
81	9	"Odnu!"	Christina Sotta	Jake Baumgart	December 2, 2021	409
Millennia ago, a village of metahumans founded by Vandal is slaughtered by Klarion. He is one of the Lords of Chaos, cosmic beings in constant conflict with their counterparts, the Lords of Order. After many fights, Vandal and Klarion call a truce. Another Lord of Chaos, Child, arrives on Earth in the present. She creates a diamond golem named Flaw as her anchor, attracting the attention of Zatanna and her students (Mary, Khalid, and Tracy). When they arrive, they encounter Klarion, who had also sensed Child arriving. They fight, and Klarion defeats them, but is summoned by Child before he can kill them. The Phantom Stranger, who is narrating the story, warns Vandal Savage about the upcoming threat, as a reminder of his pact with Klarion. Meanwhile, Blue Devil unsuccessfully tries to talk Garfield out of his depression. In a mid-credits scene, Saturn Girl and Chameleon Boy watch an episode of Garfield's sci-fi show Space Trek 2036.
82	10	"Nomed Esir!"	Christopher Berkeley	Kevin Grevioux	December 9, 2021	410
Vandal and his grandson Arion rebuild Atlantis. The Lords of Order recruit Arion, giving him the power to create humans with magic, Homo Magi. Vandal has Klarion sink Atlantis so it may conquer beneath the oceans; killing Arion and creating Homo mrmanus (modern Atlanteans) in the process. In the present, Child reveals the Lords of Chaos sent her to replace Klarion and is backed by their combined power. The Phantom Stranger teleports Zatanna to witness the fight between Klarion and Child, while taking her students to recruit Etrigan the Demon for support. Despite Etrigan joining the fight, Child overwhelms all participants, forcing Klarion to retreat. Zatanna decides to ask for assistance to defeat Child. Meanwhile, Em'ree helps M'gann with her grief, and Vandal talks to his son Nabu/Doctor Fate, warning him of Child. In a mid-credits scene, Vandal prepares to have the Light and everything of value to him evacuated to Warworld.
83	11	"Teg Ydaer!"	Vinton Heuck	Nida Chowdhry	December 16, 2021	411
In Ancient Babylon, Vandal and Klarion summon Starro, which kills Vandal's son Nabu. The Lords of Order make Nabu's spirit one of them, anchoring him to the helmet. In the present, Zatanna goes to Nabu for help, but he chooses not to interfere. He also claims Zatanna's students are unprepared for battle. Nabu tests each of the students with their own insecurities, though all three pass their tests. Zatara points out Nabu working with his host's bodies and other heroes proves that Order does not have to stand apart. Klarion comes to Doctor Fate for help but is followed by Child. In the ensuing battle, Flaw kills Klarion's anchor cat Teekl, untethering him. Meanwhile, Garfield becomes addicted to sleeping pills. In a mid-credits scene, a school bus driver and children scream as they fall through different dimensions.
84	12	"Og Htrof Dna Reuqnoc!"	Christina Sotta	Brandon Vietti	December 23, 2021	412
Child destroys the Tower of Fate, cracking Fate's helmet, and proceeds to cause various disasters across the planet. While heroes and villains team up to contain the damage, Dr. Fate, Zatanna, and her protégés follow and confront Child at the North Pole. She easily defeats them, and Klarion, having traveled through time by anchoring himself to the school bus seen in the previous episode, finds them shortly after. In flashbacks, Zatara talks about his beginnings as a hero, his duty as Doctor Fate, and his relationship with his daughter, his deceased wife, and his mentor, Kent Nelson. He makes Nabu promise to tell Zatanna his story should his body die. Meanwhile, Garfield is replaced on Space Trek 3016 because of his poor performance. In a mid-credits scene, Superman talks to Black Lightning about setting up reserve heroes for the Justice League.
85	13	"Kaerb Ym Traeh!"	Christopher Berkeley	Greg Weisman	December 30, 2021	413
After finding Klarion a new anchor cat, he and the heroes confront Child again. Vandal and the Phantom Stranger convince the Lords of Order and Chaos that Earth is needed to stop Darkseid. The Lords remove Child's power and Traci destroys Flaw, causing Child to untether. Zatanna proposes she, her father, Traci, and Khalid rotate weekly as Fate's host. Mary gets excluded, as she is deemed too much like Nabu, and quits the team. Khalid suspects Zatanna took on students to get her father back, but as the rest agree to her plan, he joins in. Sending the school bus back to its place in time, Zatanna sees Conner pleading for help. Meanwhile, Garfield breaks up with Perdita after she discovers his sleeping pill addiction and depression. In a mid-credits scene, Zatara begins therapy with Dinah affected by his time as Nabu's host. In a post-credits scene, Granny Goodness' voice provokes a distraught Mary into saying "Shazam".
Part 2
86	14	"Nautical Twilight"	Vinton Heuck	Mae Catt	March 31, 2022	414
Dick tries to persuade Kaldur to take a break to deal with his grief over Conner's death, but he refuses and heads to Poseidonis for an important Atlantean conference. Violet pays a visit to Gabrielle's mother to learn about Gabrielle's faith, Islam. Meanwhile, Conner and an unconscious Phantom Girl turn out to be alive in a disembodied state in an unknown dimension. Ocean Master attacks the conference but is stopped by an unknown man. In a mid-credits scene, Violet talks to Harper Row about religion and, having come to identify as non-binary, asks to be identified by the pronouns they/them.
87	15	"Ebb Tide"	Christina Sotta	Greg Weisman	March 31, 2022	415
With M'gaan's retired bio-ship as an aid for their travel, Saturn Girl and Chameleon Boy reveal to Superman that they are heroes from the future and ask for him to be in Happy Harbor in ten years from the present day. They later go to Bart Allen for help. Meanwhile, King Arthur begins repair works in Poseidonis and Mera believes the stranger might be the Atlantean king of an ancient prophecy. Child causes a pillar of fire in Atlantis, and Mera, Ocean Master, and the unknown man defeat it together. Orm is later arrested and the stranger reveals himself to be Arion. While exploring the dimension, Conner grows frustrated until the Devourer, a Dunkleosteus-like creature, attacks him while he is protecting Phantom Girl. Conner discovers the Devourer is attracted by his anger and calms himself, allowing it to pass through him harmlessly. In a mid-credits scene, Vandal declares Project Thrinos to be their priority.
88	16	"Emergency Dive"	Christopher Berkeley	Brandon Vietti	March 31, 2022	416
M'gann returns to Happy Harbor and learns about Garfield's depressive state. She recruits teammates and friends to convince him to seek help, but Garfield rejects them, claiming he does not need help. However, M'gann informs Garfield that he has to attend a mandatory mental health check with Black Canary, or he will be dismissed from the team. In Poseidonis, Arion gains popularity among the citizens. King Arthur sends Kaldur on a mission to find the Crown of Arion, which was lost in the ruins of Atlantis when it was sunk. While Kaldur, Wyynde, La'gaan, and Delphis sneak into Xebel during the unrest, King Arthur visits Ocean Master and realizes he is a clone. As Conner carries Phantom Girl, he starts to hallucinate about his life and spots the school bus, which Klarion has made his vessel. He pleads for help, but is unheard. In a mid-credits scene, Forager delivers the valedictorian speech during his and Halo's graduation.
89	17	"Leviathan Wakes"	Vinton Heuck	Khary Payton	April 7, 2022	417
After weeks of searching, Kaldur's party finds Arion's crown and returns it to Poseidonis. M'gann discovered from her telepathy that both Orm and Arion are clone created by Vandal Savage for his plan to taking control Atlantis. Using Orm as a distraction, Arion is loyal to the Light and followed Savage's instruction. As Arion puts the Crown on, the Lords of Order disintegrate him, deeming him unworthy and removing the Crown's magic. Arthur refuses to be the High King again, and Mera becomes regent, fulfilling the prophecy. Arthur decides to focus on being a father and returns to the League. La'gaan agrees to be Aquaman too and Kaldur decides to take a leave of absence from the League. Meanwhile, Doctor Fate goads Savage for his failure in taking over Atlantis. In a mid-credits scene, Kaldur seeks counseling with Black Canary, confronting his grief.
90	18	"Beyond the Grip of the Gods!"	Christina Sotta	Taneka Stotts	April 14, 2022	418
Rocket has trouble bringing her autistic son, Amistad, to his father's house and goes on a League mission with Jay Garrick and Forager to New Genesis for a summit with the New Gods and Green Lantern Corps. Meanwhile, a bug steals a device from the New Gods' warehouse and escapes. On Apokolips, Ma'alefa'ak works for Darkseid, who is unimpressed at the moment, and Grayven instructs him to follow Lor-Zod's command. A Martian slips something into the stolen technology, which makes Orion turn berserk. As Raquel contains Orion, Lightray uses the Mother Box to calm him down. Raquel grows distrustful of Orion because of his parentage. Meanwhile, Conner wonders aimlessly and continues hallucinating, until Dru-Zod appears and offers to teach him how to survive in the Phantom Zone. In a mid-credits scene, Black Lightning and Superman discuss candidates for the Justice League Reserve.: Note: This episode is dedicated to René Auberjonois, the voice of Blockbuster, who died on December 8, 2019.
91	19	"Encounter Upon the Razor's Edge!"	Christopher Berkeley	Jim Krieg & Giancarlo Volpe	April 21, 2022	419
It is revealed that General Zod was sent to the Phantom Zone by the House of El before Krypton's destruction. He is released in the 31st century by the United Planets, but gets re-imprisoned by the Legion after planning an invasion. Lor-Zod, his son, travelled back in time to kill Superboy, who inspired the creation of the Legion of Super-Heroes. Lor now plots to steal a Phantom Zone projector to free his parents and their followers. En route to New Genesis, Green Lanterns Tomar-Re and Kilowog reunite with Blue Lantern Razer, after four years of his quest. On the planet, Razer trades his new ring for his old red one to Metron, who goads him into unleashing its power. After injuring Female Forager by accident, Razer realizes his mistake and decides to use both his rings at once, before leaving to find his displaced love, Aya. Meanwhile, Bart agrees to assist the Legion and installs a cosmic treadmill on M'gann's retired bio-ship. In a mid-credits scene, the team celebrates Jay's 102nd birthday.
92	20	"Forbidden Secrets of Civilizations Past!"	Vinton Heuck	Greg Weisman	April 28, 2022	420
Lor-Zod, Ma'alefa'ak, and Mantis attempt to steal the Phantom Zone projector from Metron's vault, using the Kaizer Thrall device to enter his hidden dimension. A baby Sun-Eater that guards the vault disrupts their efforts, so they capture Metron and force him to lead them to the Projector. Metron escapes by tricking Lor into opening a kryptonite box. He flees to the summit on New Genesis, while Mantis saves his team and finds the projector. Beast Boy receives counseling from Black Canary, admitting his need for help. Forager reveals he is considering leaving the Team for Female Forager. In the Phantom Zone, Conner joins Dru's group of imprisoned Kryptonians. In a mid-credits scene, Forager recites Romeo's speech from the balcony scene in Romeo and Juliet.
93	21	"Odyssey of Death!"	Christina Sotta	Aaron Sparrow	May 5, 2022	421
On New Genesis, Lor and his team use the projector to open a portal to the Phantom Zone to retrieve Dru. The process awakens a Promethean, endangering the planet. Rocket's team appears and tries to stop the villains. Tomar-Re is killed by Lor-Zod, but successfully diverts the energy of the Promethean. His ring chooses Female Forager as his successor, allowing her to disable the Kaizer Thrall. Jay contains the portal, while the Legion arrives on bio-ship and destroy the projector and Saturn Girl, sensing Phantom Girl through the portal, wakes her up. Lor-Zod and Ma'alefa'ak storm bio-ship and take all onboard hostage. The New Gods and Green Lantern Corps consent to the treaty, and agree to hunt down Lor-Zod and Ma'alefa'ak. Female Forager decides to train as a Green Lantern on Oa while keeping a long-distance relationship with Forager. In a mid-credits scene, Female Forager recites a monologue from Hamlet, which she received from Forager.
94	22	"Rescue and Search"	Christopher Berkeley	Charlotte Fullerton	May 12, 2022	422
Zatanna and Dick team up to determine if Conner is still alive. During their investigation, they discover Bart has also gone missing and learn about the existence of Chameleon Boy and Saturn Girl. They confirm Conner is alive and trapped in the Phantom Zone. In Fate's tower, Dick, Zatanna, Artemis, Raquel, and Kaldur summon Klarion to ask him to bring Conner back, but he refuses. Zatanna asks Dick to find the school bus Klarion used as an anchor. In the Zone, Conner explains to Dru and Ursa what he remembers of his origins and the fate of Krypton. He believes he killed Superman. When the Zods leave, Phantom Girl warns Connor they are in danger. In a mid-credits scene, Female Forager and the Green Lanterns study the Kaizer Thrall and discover remnants of an 11-year-old human boy inside it. He tries to communicate with them.: Note: This episode is dedicated to the memory of Ed Asner, the voice of Kent Nelson, who died on August 29, 2021.
95	23	"Ego and Superego"	Vinton Hueck	Michael Vogel	May 19, 2022	423
In Markovia, Lizard Johnny is rescued by Brion and his Infinitors, who are unaware that Everyman is responsible for inciting anti-metahuman mobs. Johnny is later piled with propaganda. Violet moves into college, where Harper admits to being in love with them. Realizing their unresolved feelings for Brion, Violet goes to Markovia and tries to convince him to change sides. Brion refuses and Violet leaves, deciding to invite Harper out. In the Phantom Zone, Phantom Girl explains to Conner how they got there and attempts to leave with him. Still under the influence of the Zods, Conner refuses and exposes her to Dru and Ursa, forcing her to retreat to Mars. Meanwhile, Zatanna's group finds the school bus, repairs it, and uses it to create a portal to the Zone.
96	24	"Zenith and Abyss"	Christina Sotta	Akira "Mark" Fujita	May 26, 2022	424
The Team finds Conner in the Phantom Zone but he refuses to join them. M'Gann, the Justice League, and Female Forager make contact with the Kaizer Thrall, learning it contains the brain of Danny Chase, a metahuman boy who was trafficked by the Light to Apokolips and dissected by DeSaad. J'emm J'axx contacts the League, revealing with Phantom Girl that Superboy is alive. Planning to rescue Superboy, they travel to Trombus, a planet under a red sun to ensure the Kryptonians will be powerless, and create a Boom Tube to the Zone. However, Ma'alefa'ak and Lor arrive, take control of the Kaizer Thrall and subdue the group. Dru, Ursa, Faora, and Conner leave the Phantom Zone. Lor greets his parents and declares victory. In a mid-credits scene, Teekl sleeps on Warworld's vacant control chair.
97	25	"Over and Out"	Christopher Berkeley	Greg Weisman	June 2, 2022	425
The Team holds off Zod's army from escaping the Phantom Zone through the Kaizer Thrall's Boom Tube. Nightwing volunteers to go through it, winds up in the Fortress of Solitude, and seemingly dies fighting Lor. Zatanna secures the Team's safety by opening a portal which closes before Rocket can follow. M'gann's group and the Legion go after the Zods. Sensing their arrival, Ursa, newly turned into the Emerald Empress, blasts the bio-ship. Superman survives the crash, but is poisoned with kryptonite and taken hostage. The Zods go to Metropolis, where Dru claims rulership over Earth and orders Connor to execute Superman.
98	26	"Death and Rebirth"	Vinton Heuck	Greg Weisman	June 9, 2022	426
It is revealed that Dick and M'gann's group faked their deaths. They head to Metropolis and reunite with Kaldur, Zatanna, and Artemis. The heroes fight Zod's team while M'gann restores Conner's memories. He, Superman, Danny, and an alive Rocket join the fight and win. Zod and his followers are sent back to the Phantom Zone. Lor escapes in the repaired Time Sphere that brought Rocket back courtesy of Metron, but this results in Lor's death due to Metron's hijacking. Pregnant with the unborn Lor, Ursa is taken to planet Daxam by the Emerald Eye of Ekron. A few days later, Conner and M'gann finally get married in the presence of their friends and family, while Brainiac 5 takes the Legionnaires back to the future. The Light captures the Kryptonians in the Zone and holds them captive on Warworld, while Darkseid and Grayven offer Ma'alefa'ak a new planet for the White Martians. In a post-credits scene, Darkseid meets his two newest Furies: Black Mary and a Kryptonian they received from the Light, Kara Zor-El.
