= Mister Twister (comics) =

Mister Twister is the name of three supervillains appearing in comic books published by DC Comics.

== Publication history ==
The Bromwell Stikk incarnation of Mister Twister first appeared in The Brave and the Bold #54 (July 1964), and was created by Bob Haney and Bruno Premiani. He is the first villain who Robin, Kid Flash, and Aqualad fought as the Teen Titans.

The demon incarnation of Mister Twister first appeared in Titans Hunt #2 (January 2016), and was created by Dan Abnett and Stephen Segovia.

== Fictional character biography ==
=== Dan Judd ===
Dan Judd is a writer who decides to research his latest crime novel by becoming a criminal. Becoming Mister Twister, he forms a gang. When Superman stumbles upon his crime sprees, Twister gets away by having Superman rescue some bystanders from danger. When Judd's gang discovers that they are being used for his novel, they double-cross him and rob him. Upon deducing Twister's identity, Superman rescues Judd and rounds up his gang. Judd ends up in prison, where he decides to write a novel on prison life.

=== Bromwell Stikk ===
Mister Twister

Publication information
- Publisher: DC Comics
- First appearance: The Brave and the Bold #54 (July 1964)
- Created by: Bob Haney; Bruno Premiani

In-story information
- Alter ego: Bromwell Stikk
- Notable aliases: Gargoyle
- Abilities: Mister Twister: Wields a weather-controlling stick.; Gargoyle: Super-strength, durability, and stamina

The second Mister Twister is Bromwell Stikk. He was born in the small town of Hatton Corners. His ancestry can be traced back to colonial times where his ancestor Jacob Stikk leased the town to colonists for the price of a feather from a passenger pigeon. Each year, the town elders give the pigeon feather to the Stikk family as payment.

In the present day, Bromwell Stikk leaves the town to live in exile on Goat Island. While there, he discovers a Native American cave and a shaman's medicine staff. When Bromwell dips the staff in a special brew, it gains the ability to control the forces of nature. With his new powers, Bromwell becomes Mister Twister and returns to Hatton Corners to take revenge on the people who spurned him. He demands payment of the feather of a passenger pigeon that was never given to his later ancestors. Due to the extinction of the passenger pigeon, the mayor is unable to pay. Twister punishes the town by summoning a tornado that whisks away the town's teenage populace. Upon enslaving the teenagers, Twister brings them to Goat Island and has them erect a stone tower in his honor. Robin, Kid Flash, and Aqualad arrive in Hatton Corners and learn of the incident, and head off to Goat Island. Kid Flash manages to erect the tower for the children, as Aqualad summons a large whale to move the island. When Twister discovers the island is not in its usual location, he causes havoc in Hatton Corners. He manages to subdue Aqualad and Kid Flash before Robin disarms Twister of his staff. Twister is taken into custody and the children are reunited with their parents. Afterwards, Robin, Aqualad, and Kid Flash form the Teen Titans.

It is later revealed that the Teen Titans' battle with Mister Twister had caught the attention of Antithesis, a malevolent entity who uses Twister as an instrument of revenge. He summons Twister and transforms him into the Gargoyle. In this new form, Gargoyle fights the Teen Titans. As Gargoyle, Bromwell sows doubt in all the Teen Titans except for Robin. Robin surrenders, allowing him to be transported to Limbo so that he can fight Gargoyle. He smashes Gargoyle's ring and traps him in Limbo.

Many years later during Infinite Crisis, Mister Twister is among the mystics who bind the Spectre to Crispus Allen.

In "One Year Later", Bromwell Stikk is shown amongst the homeless living in a soup kitchen during Christmas. He encounters Roy Harper, who has volunteered at the soup kitchen. Stikk makes peace with Harper, grateful that someone remembers him.

=== Demon ===
In DC Rebirth, Mister Twister is a psychic demon who is trapped outside the multiverse when Doctor Manhattan merges the DC, Vertigo, and Wildstorm universes.

== Powers and abilities ==
The first Mister Twister has no powers.

The second Mister Twister wields a stick that enables him to manipulate weather and generate force fields. However, its power depletes over time unless he uses a special potion to replenish it. As the Gargoyle, he has superhuman physical abilities and hypnotic powers.

The third Mister Twister possesses telepathy and mind-control, which are enhanced by his staff.

== Other versions ==
An alternate universe variant of Bromwell Stikk / Mister Twister appears in Flash (vol. 2) #165. In a world without speedsters, he kills Speedy and Aqualad and renders Wonder Girl comatose during his first fight with the Teen Titans. The Amazons kill Stikk and leave his severed head outside the Justice League's headquarters.

== In other media ==
The Bromwell Stikk incarnation of Mister Twister appears in Young Justice, voiced by John de Lancie. This version is an assistant to T. O. Morrow and a member of the Light whose abilities are derived from powered armor.
