= List of Aquaman enemies =

The following is a collection of enemies and supervillains appearing in American comic books published by DC Comics. These characters are depicted as adversaries of the superhero Aquaman and his family and allies.

Since Aquaman first appeared in More Fun Comics #73 (November 1941), as with most superheroes, a cast of recurring enemies to Aquaman and his family have been introduced throughout the years. Some of the character's most notable villains include his archenemy, the mercenary Black Manta; his own half-brother the Ocean Master; the humanoid sharks King Shark and Orca; the pirate the Scavenger; Mera's twin sister Siren; and the Trench species, among others.

== Supervillains and themed criminals ==
The following fictional characters are listed in alphabetical order by the name of their supervillain persona. Each character's first appearance and brief biographies of each fictional character are also listed, staying to their fictional histories and characteristics in the DC Universe. Sometimes more than one fictional character will share a supervillain persona. In those cases, those will be divided into multiple sections.

Villain	First appearance	Description
Abyssal Dark	Aquaman (vol. 8) #34 (May 2018)	A malefic force born of ancient Atlantis' overuse of magic. The Abyssal Dark is a demon of pure esoteric anima begotten from the conjurers of the surface-borne city's thirst for greater knowledge and power, promising them greatness from its services, but withholding the terrible price that entailed. A great war would break out wherein the dark entity would be sealed within the annals of Atlantis' history, but it would find ways of rewriting the record of itself as the wellspring of Atlantean Arcanum to draw others into unleashing it, eventually finding the ideal liberator in Corum Rath, thousands of years later.
Admiral Strom	Aquaman (vol. 5) #3 (November 1994)	High-ranking military officer, allied with Ocean Master and other Aquaman enemies.
Agent X-6	Adventure Comics #273 (June 1960)	Operative of Smugglers Incorporated.
Amphitrite	Action Comics #518 (April 1981)	Female Atlantean criminal, allegedly Aquaman's mother.
Aquabeast	Aquaman #34 (July 1967)	Wealthy playboy Peter Dudley fell in love with Aquaman's wife Mera and paid Dr. Hans Ludorf to transform him into an Aquaman duplicate. The procedure failed and Dudley instead became a beast-like humanoid.
Aquamarines	Aquaman (vol. 8) #12 (February 2017)	A group of United States Marine Corps soldiers who were enhanced with the ability to transform into humanoid sea animals.
Awesome Threesome	Aquaman #36 (November 1967)	A trio of sentient robots named the Torpedo Man (a.k.a. the Torp), Magneto, and the Claw.
Big Jim Mason	Adventure Comics #263 (August 1959)	A politician, Mason was the popular governor of an island nation named Comstock. However, he embezzled public funds and was actively trying to sabotage the electoral campaign of his rival, Vic Wake.
Black Jack	More Fun Comics #74 (December 1941)	Also "Blackjack," modern-day pirate adversary of the Golden Age Aquaman in More Fun Comics and Adventure Comics; appeared in a total of 22 stories from 1941 to 1950.
Black Jack	Aquaman (vol. 8) #2 (July 2016)	A later supervillainess who is an agent of Black Manta following his usurpation of leadership over the mysterious organization code-named N.E.M.O after they broke him out.
Black Manta David Hyde (Note: Indicates the character has appeared in live-action media.)	Aquaman #35 (September 1967)	A would-be conqueror of Atlantis from the surface world, and Aquaman's deadliest and greatest enemy. A man with a sordid past and hatred of the Ocean King; either for being abandoned by the former as a child while a prisoner of pirates, an autistic lad with a fascination with water, or left unhinged when after Xebelians captured him and his girlfriend to run experiments on her and their unborn son.
Black Manta David Hyde	Aquaman (vol. 7) #7 (May 2012)	David Hyde is a simple, albeit cutthroat, scuba diver alongside his treasure hunting father. He was paid by Dr. Shen to secure proof of Atlantis' existence. Due to a mishap wherein Arthur killed his father however, David Hyde would later become a wrathful terrorist and pirate hellbent on destroying Aquaman and shattering the Atlantean legacy, regardless of whether the world died screaming in his vengeful wake.
Broadside	Aquaman (vol. 8) #16 (November 2016)	An operative of the Nautical Enforcement of Macrocosmic Order organizations wetworks division. Broadside is one of N.E.M.O's best agents when it comes to killing Atlanteans, armed with a pair of linear launch devices which discharge volatile uranium explosive bolts and micromines. He usually wears a cloaking field device to disguise himself in public and boasts a slight racism towards Atlanteans.
Bres	Aquaman (vol. 5) #1 (August 1994)	Bres was a citizen of the Atlantean lost city of Thierna Na Oge and a respected member of the Tuatha de Danaan. She served on the ruling city council known as the Conclave of Twelve under the leadership of her sister, Queen Nuada Silverhand. However, Bres was ambitious and coveted the throne for herself. She convinced the other eleven Conclave members that Nuada had fallen out of favor with their goddess, Dana, and needed to abdicate her seat.
Captain Demo	Adventure Comics #441 (September 1975)	Pirate who surrounded Atlantis with bombs in attempt to extort the citizens to crown him king; his name is an obvious pun on Captain Nemo.
Captain Rader	World's Finest Comics #127 (August 1962)	Undersea pirate, used a submarine disguised as a giant fish.
Captain Skover	More Fun Comics #76 (February 1942)	Trawler captain, committed crimes at sea, used robot-like armor and was an opponent for the Golden Age Aquaman.
Corum Rath	Aquaman: Rebirth #1 (August 2016)	Leader of the Deluge, an Atlantean terrorist and avid surface world hater, until he usurped King Arthur's crown and successfully ruled Atlantis for a while. Inevitably fell from good graces when his abuse of power and forbidden magics literally turned him into a power-hungry monster out to destroy Atlantis and conquer the surface world. An Atlantean puritan, Rath's regime often involved using magic in the persecution and expunging of Atlantis' marine life-resembling citizens called the Seachanged, individuals often labeled as undesirables who bear the racist moniker of taintblood because of either having adapting these traits while adjusting to undersea habitation, or being touched by powerful magic; such as that used by the Crown of Thorns.
Charybdis	Aquaman (vol. 5) #1	The supervillain responsible for the loss of Aquaman's left hand. He is a dangerous creature that was the result of his plan backfiring when he was catapulted into a school of piranha. He was later known as the Piranha Man.
Chimera	Aquaman (vol. 7) #33 (July 2014)	Coombs is a Triton Base employee who was mauled by sharks despite Aquaman's intervention. His body underwent unusual experimentation by Dr. Edrid Orson and was transformed into the "Chimera", a chimeric sea monster with the ability to shapeshift and command sea life.
Count Vitto	Adventure Comics #123 (December 1947)	Evil Venetian nobleman who fought the Golden Age Aquaman.
Creature King	Showcase #32 (May 1961)	An unidentified diver was mutated into a gigantic humanoid purple-skinned monster by Wilo the Wizard's potion; looted ships.
Cutlass Charlie	Justice League of America #61 (March 1968)	Sword-wielding criminal, recruited by Doctor Destiny along with Captain Boomerang, the Tattooed Man, and others to battle the Justice League of America.
Atlan The Dead King	Aquaman (vol. 7) #16 (March 2013)	The former king and first ruler of ancient Atlantis. Atlan was once a kind king and loving father who sought to unify the world under the seven kingdoms he had raised through Atlantis, his island city. But his traitorous brother Orin the First and his wife led a coup that nearly killed him, usurped his throne and murdered his beloved wife and children, stealing away everything he had built. In his grief and despair, he crafted seven powerful artifacts with which he infiltrated his former kingdom and slaughtered his duplicitous kin, plunging the nation into civil war all before using his most powerful relic to sink the nation beneath the waves. In modern times, now christened the Dead King, he awakened to the resonance of his treacherous brother's descendant's telepathic broadcast across the oceans; seeking to reclaim his throne and lordship of the world once again.
Dead Water	Aquaman (vol. 7) #49 (April 2016)	A feral, dangerous parasitic water elemental who can symbiotically host any individual who feels fear in the presence of its alien warp rift. Dead Water boasts the ability to transform its hosts into clawed, fanged monstrosities, which are able to become and traverse the catalyst of water needed for the change.
Dagon	Justice League of America #35 (May 1965)	Possesses water-controlling powers, wears a demonic costume.
Deep Six	New Gods #2 (April–May 1971)	All six fish-like members of this group possess superhuman strength as well as the ability to breathe and function underwater; created by Darkseid. The team returns to face Aquaman and his allies Koryak and the Dolphin. The new members are actually "spawns" of the original, raised in birthing chambers.
Demon Gate	Aquaman (vol. 5) #26 (November 1996)	Kimon Tanaka was a sea captain who hunted dolphins for a living. He captured several dolphins for the Shinobi research center, one of whom was Porm (Aquaman's dolphin mother). When Kimon's boat was destroyed, he was left by Aquaman to be eaten by sharks. However, Kimon was rescued by his brother Tanaka, head of Raiden Industries. Tanaka rebuilt his brother's body, turning him into a cyborg.
Devilfish	Justice Leagues: Justice League of Atlantis #1 (March 2001)	Renegade member of Aquaman's short-lived "Justice League of Atlantis".
Doctor Deering	Aquaman #15 (May/June 1964)	A scientist working on a method allowing normal humans to breathe underwater, the method worked on himself-the downside being unable to live on the surface. He snapped and turned to crime.
Doctor Starbuck	Aquaman #28 (July 1966)	Evil scientist, briefly took over Atlantis and fomented a war with the surface world, assisted by the water-breathing eagle Krakka.
Doctor Varn	Adventure Comics #251 (August 1958)	Time-traveling criminal scientist from AD 6958.
Duke Flarer	More Fun Comics #99 (September 1944)	Criminal genius operating out of a volcano hideout who fought the Golden Age Aquaman.
Duko	Adventure Comics #194 (November 1953)	Acquired a fleet of surplus war vessels and recruited hundreds of criminals to form a "pirate navy," he fought the Golden Age Aquaman.
Eel	Aquaman (vol. 6) #21 (October 2004)	A criminal with mild telekinetic powers, Mort Coolidge had a career in both Gotham City and San Diego before the earthquake that sank half of that city. Here he found his powers far more effective, figuring out that he had greater control over water.
Electric Man	Adventure Comics #254 (November 1958)	Roy Pinto was an escaped prison convict who decided to keep a low profile. His specialty was electric eels. Constantly handling them mutated him, granting him immumity to electric shocks. Later escaped from prison with five other villains in JLA #5 to battle the JLA, but was captured by the Green Arrow.
Professor Enos Snark	Adventure Comics #284 (May 1961)	Scientist that provided advanced technology to pirates in exchange for a percentage of the loot.
Fire Trolls	Aquaman #1 (February 1962)	Gigantic enemies of the water sprites (Quisp's people) and the world at large who have fire-based abilities.
Fire Trolls	Aquaman (vol. 7) #38 (March 2015)	Mystical volcanic guardians of the trans-dimensional Maelstrom Gates used by ancient Atlantis and its rulers.
Fisherman	Aquaman #21 (May 1965)	Supervillain who uses fishing gimmicks to commit crimes and a member of the Terrible Trio.
Gamesman	Aquaman (vol. 5) #35 (August 1997)	A hunter who goes after superheroes like Animal Man. Aquaman helps to defeat him.
Gustave the Great Animal-Master	Adventure Comics #261 (June 1959)	An expert animal trainer, Gustave would perform daring crimes on the side. Since Aquaman stopped him while in action, Gustave swore revenge.
Hadley	Adventure Comics #257 (February 1959)	Criminal surgically altered to duplicate Aquaman's powers.
Hagen	Aquaman (vol. 6) #2 (March 2003)	Treasonous Atlantean sorcerer who courted favor in the mystic council of the equally treacherous sorceress; Gamemnea. He and his cabal employed the same dark craft garnered in her service to assume high positions within the council of Atlantis by making a puppet of the Queen Mera, deposing King Arthur and anyone else who opposed their rule. Eventually attempting a genocidal takeover of the surface world. He later died when Atlantis was destroyed by the Spectre in Day of Vengeance during the Infinite Crisis event.
Harry Black	Detective Comics #294 (August 1961)	Commanded sea monsters to attack the shipping lanes.
Human Flying Fish	Adventure Comics #272 (May 1960)	Vic Bragg was a swimming champion before turning to crime, where he fell in with Doctor Krill, the brilliant medical doctor and marine biologist who had also turned to a life of crime. After several months of recovery and training, Bragg began his career as the Human Flying Fish. One of the few Aquaman villains to appear in the Super Friends comic book.
Iceberg Head	DC Special Series #6 (November 1977)	Ice creature who caused a worldwide cold wave so that the world would be frozen like himself; convinced by Aquaman, Aqualad and Mera to desist, "melted" and became a water creature.
Jason Deeter	Adventure Comics #245 (February 1958)	Sorcerer with seaweed hair, used "voodoo power" to control Aquaman and Topo via voodoo dolls.
John Cook	Showcase #31 (March 1961)	Stole Professor Richards' ray machine and used it to "evolve" sealife into futuristic sea monsters under his command.
Ka'arl	Aquaman #39 (May 1968)	Evil Venusian.
Kadaver	Aquaman (vol. 8) #26 (September 2017)	An Atlantean hadalin who lived in the Ninth Tride with Corum Rath in his youth. A natural borne magician, he would train on his own as the Silent School would never take him on as a pupil. Eventually becoming a mob enforcer in later life only to be called upon by his former friend, now King of Atlantis as his own court was plotting against him. Slaughtering the silent school practitioners after they denied them access to the Wellspring of Atlantean magic. King Rath made Kad the new magistrate of the school, Kadaver would be hideously mutated by the Abyssal Dark force only to die at the hands of Atlantean guardian spirits soon after.
Karla	Aquaman #24 (November/December 1965)	Karla is an enemy of Aquaman whose hair has been turned to living flame. She controls her "hair" psionically for a variety of combat uses. Her fire is not affected by the undersea environment and her body is invulnerable to fire. She was the leader of the Terrible Trio.
King Shark Nanaue	Superboy (vol. 3) #0 (October 1994)	Born in Hawaii, Nanaue is a humanoid shark, his father is "The King of all Sharks" – also known as the Shark God. Other characters, such as Special Agent Sam Makoa, have dismissed this as superstition and referred to Nanaue as a "savage mutation" with no mystical nature.
Kirk	Aquaman #12 (November 1963)	Assistant to Doctor Cyrus Beard; used the latter's technology – which transformed air-breathers into water-breathers – for crime.
Kordax	Atlantis Chronicles #4	A semi-immortal ancestor of Aquaman who commands all sea life. Born to Queen Cora of Poseidonis but abandoned at birth due to his grotesque, green-scaled body, Kordax survived in the ocean thanks to his mental control over sea creatures. As an adult, he returned to Atlantis leading an army of sharks in a failed bid for the throne. His punishment included the loss of his left hand (replaced with a sword) and banishment. Kordak was later killed by Aquaman.
Krutz	More Fun Comics #79 (May 1942)	Commanded a Nazi battleship disguised as an iceberg and fought the Golden Age Aquaman.
Lammia	Mera: Queen of Atlantis #4 (May 2018)	Dowager Matriarch of Xebel and grandmother of Mera.
Lemur	Aquaman #8 (March 1963)	Extraterrestrial from the planet Phrygia, attempted to steal Earth's water.
Leron	Aquaman #11 (September/October 1963)	Leron was a revolutionary who lived in the realm known as Dimension Aqua. He led a revolt against their world's reigning queen, Mera. Post-DC Rebirth, he is captain of the Xebel military under the rule of Nereus.
Lord Wexel	Aquaman Special #1 (June 1989)	High-ranking official among a jellyfish-like race which briefly conquered Atlantis.
Lukhan	Aquaman #20 (March 1965)	Exiled Atlantean bandit.
Malignant Amoeba	Adventure Comics #135 (December 1948)	Giant artificial life-form created by scientists, eats everything in its path. The scientists spent ten years containing it until it escaped and encountered the Golden Age Aquaman.
Marauder	Aquaman Vol. 6 #20 (September 2004)	A cyborg mercenary.
Marine Marauder	Adventure Comics #449 (January–February 1977)	A supervillain with mental control over undersea life.
Marine Maraand	Adventures of the Outsiders #37 (September 1986)	A later supervillainess who fought the Outsiders and had the same name, costume and powers. She always desired fame and wealth, but disliked the hard work associated with business and investments, so she turned her powers towards crime.
Maritorn	Aquaman (vol. 5) #48 (September 1998)	An alien race; invaded Mera's home dimension.
Master Sargasso	More Fun Comics #78 (April 1942)	Stranded ships in the Sargasso Sea and robbed them before fighting the Golden Age Aquaman.
Merder	Aquaman #5 (September 1962)	Evil sorcerer of ancient times, formerly imprisoned with his underlings within a drop of water.
Merdo the Wizard	World's Finest Comics #132 (March 1963)	Ancient wizard, possessed Aquaman's octopus ally Topo.
Mister Neptune	Adventure Comics #205 (October 1954)	Used faked supernatural abilities to challenge the Golden Age Aquaman for the rulership of the seven seas.
Mongo	Aquaman #30 (November 1966)	Ruled the underwater "ancient city of evil" Necrus, which periodically materialized on Earth.
Morrel	More Fun Comics #85 (November 1942)	Criminal hunter who used electric guns and fought the Golden Age Aquaman.
Naeco	Showcase #33 (July 1961)	Dictator of the planet Venus, overthrown by Aquaman, Aqualad and rebel leader Mermor.
Namma	Aquaman (vol. 8) #43 (February 2019)	Namma, whose true name is Mother Salt, is the primordial sea goddess in Mesopotamian mythology. At the beginning of time she, alongside her husband Father Sea, created the first gods whom would then create the World. But they're rapid innovation irritated her husband to no end, whom opted to kill his children and restart from scratch. Unable to go through with it; Mother Salt warned her children of her husbands plans. In response they killed him in his sleep, sending their mother into a blind rage which tore her asunder and created new monstrous Sea Gods to battle her old progeny. She would survive however, now biding her time and regaining her strength. Seeking to follow through on her late husbands scheme and destroy her children's creation so she can begin anew.
Narkran	Aquaman #41 (September 1968)	Atlantean courtier, secretly had Mera abducted so Aquaman would appoint him temporary ruler while searching for her, became a tyrant until ousted by a reunited Aquaman and Mera.
Nereus	Aquaman (vol. 7) #19 (June 2013)	The ruler of Xebel (the Second Kingdom of the Seven Seas) and one of its greatest warriors; he has never been above ploys of assassination and conspiracy to further his own political agenda. He refers to Mera as his "wife", and will stop at nothing until she is.
N.E.M.O.	Aquaman (vol. 8) #2 (July 2016)	A nebulous organization of powerful oceanic interest-based shareholders who sought to assume dominance over the world via controlling the ocean and its resources. N.E.M.O. (Nautical Enforcement of the Macrocosmic Order) was founded in the late 1800s and consolidated their stranglehold on sea line interests in the late 1900s; by controlling its greatest economy, N.E.M.O basically runs the world. Opting now to make themselves known, said cabal of interests recruited Black Manta in the hope they could use him to consolidate their power by sparking a world war between Atlantis and America by implicating Aquaman with staged acts of war.
Niccol	Aquaman #13 (January 1963)	Time-traveling supervillain from AD 2098, used a thought-control ray.
Nikkor	Aquaman #19 (January 1965)	Agitator from Mera's home dimension, briefly mind-controlled her to conquer Atlantis.
Ocean Master Orm Marius	Aquaman #29 (September 1966)	Another long-time foe of Aquaman. The Ocean Master was revealed in the 1960s to be Aquaman's fully human half-brother, Orm Marius, who had grown up in the shadow of his heroic half-brother and was jealous of his powers. Initially amnesiac of his relation to Arthur, he would go on to become a ruthless pirate with advanced technological gadgets before taking on magic powers from both the Zodiac Crystals and then making a deal with the demon-lord Neron in his escapades of terrorizing the high seas.
Ocean Master Orm Marius	Aquaman (vol. 7) #0 (November 2012)	Born the second child to Queen Atlanna of the royal bloodline. Unlike the previous continuity, Orm Marius and Arthur Curry were on more familial terms, even leaving his younger sibling the throne when Arthur felt unbecoming of it. But Orm harbored deep resentments towards humanity and the surface world for its countless years of mistreating the sea. When Nuidis Vulko instigated a naval accident that killed many Atlanteans, the Ocean Master roused his armies and declared war on the entire world.
Oceanus	Aquaman #18 (November 1964)	Would-be conqueror from Mera's home dimension.
Octopus Man	Adventure Comics #259 (April 1959)	Roland Peters conducted illegal experiments on marine life to transfer minds between species, transferred Aquaman's mind into different fish.
O.G.R.E. agents	Aquaman #26 (July 1976)	Huntress, Krako, Black Manta and Typhoon were agents of O.G.R.E.
Orvax Marius	Aquaman (vol. 7) #19 (January 2015)	Former king of Atlantis and father of Orm and Tula Marius. Once an Atlantean naval commander who ascended the throne by wedding princess Atlanna. Orvax was a vile and despicable leader whom angered many in his court, regularly abusing his wife before they're sons eyes whenever she'd admonish his hobby of using the Fleet to attack land-dweller ships. He was finally done in when an enraged Atlanna killed him after Orvax joked of killing her first family.
Phantom Sea Raider	Detective Comics #293 (July 1961)	Captain Scobey, modern-day pirate.
Piscator	Suicide Squad #59	A renegade Atlantean and self-styled Janissary whom Aquaman fought while protecting President Marlo of Qurac. Member of Onslaught.
Pomoxis	Aquaman #3 (May 1962)	Atlantean who impersonated Aquaman, attempted to conquer Atlantis with assistance from the surface world criminal Captain Clay.
Professor Jack Leach	Adventure Comics #124 (January 1948)	Assistant to Professor Ness, he used a special growth hormone to create sea serpents and fought the Golden Age Aquaman.
Professor Polloy	World's Finest Comics #131 (February 1963)	Criminal scientist, created a ray that controlled and "hardened" water (similar to Mera's later powers).
Queequeg	Aquaman (vol. 4) #2 (January 1992)	Insane whaler with an Ahab-like obsession over Aquaman.
Quirk	Aquaman #6 (November 1962)	Criminal water sprite from the same world as Aquaman's one time ally Quisp; served by Quilp and other underlings.
Qwsp	Aquaman #1 (February 1962)	A being from the Fifth Dimension, the same dimension as Mister Mxyzptlk. As with Mister Mxyzptlk, he enjoys warping reality for his own amusement. Qwsp was for many years a valued ally of the undersea monarch. However, inspired by Aquaman's sudden change in appearance and outlook, Qwsp became a deadly threat, not only to Aquaman, but to the entire world. His name was spelled 'Quisp' in his first appearances but was retconned to Qwsp when he reappeared in JLA #30.
Ragnar	Aquaman #38 (March 1968)	Atlantean nobleman, framed Aquaman for the murders of Atlantean soldiers.
Rhombus	Aquaman (vol. 5) #38 (November 1997)	Supervillain who thinks he is Deep Blue's father.
Scavenger Peter Mortimer	Aquaman #37 (January 1968)	A deep-sea diver and pirate who wears a specifically-designed diving suit to scavenge valuable treasure off the ocean floor and sell it to the highest bidder.
Scavenger Peter Mortimer	Aquaman (vol. 7) #18 (May 2013)	A scavenger who was an old enemy of Aquaman before his days in the Justice League. After Atlantis' revealing itself to the world, Peter Mortimer would resurface on the underworld stage, having acquired numerous Soviet-era subs for the purpose of collecting and selling Atlantean weaponry scrounged up from the prior conflict and selling them to the highest bidder, with intent to one day claim Atlantis as his own.
Sea Demon	Detective Comics #296 (October 1961)	The Sea Demon is an ordinary human. He used a demon costume and an electrically charged trident to exact tribute from superstitious islanders.
Seaquake	Aquaman #62 (July 1978)	An android used by the Ocean Master to try to destroy Atlantis with a sonic disruptor.
Sea Thief	Justice League of America #14 (September 1962)	Seafaring criminal, recruited by Amos Fortune along with Angle Man, Hector Hammond, and others to battle the Justice League of America.
Sea-Men	Adventure Comics #216 (September 1955)	Extraterrestrial invaders who fought the Golden Age Aquaman.
Shark	Green Lantern (vol. 2) #24 (October 1963)	Originally one of Green Lantern's enemies, Aquaman fought this mutated tiger shark on various occasions.
"Shark" Wilson	Adventure Comics #203 (August 1954)	Criminal who was magically transformed into a shark and fought the Golden Age Aquaman.
Siren	Aquaman #22 (August 1965)	Hila, twin sister of Mera, exiled from their home dimension for her criminal ways. She would scheme with the sorcerer Kandor to usurp the Atlantean throne, but she was touched by the tender affections shown by Arthur while she impersonated her sibling and mended her evil ways.
Siren	Brightest Day #4 (August 2010)	Mera's twin sister who was trained alongside her by their father, the king of the oceanic penal colony Xebel, to kill Aquaman; he who would be king of their hated enemy, Atlantis. Later leading a new mission to kill Orin when her sister failed by using an allude acquaintance Black Manta, where the two would scheme to open the Bermuda Triangle which keeps her people imprisoned to storm out and conquer both Atlantis & the Surface using David's son, Jackson Hyde.
Siren	Aquaman (vol. 7) #43 (October 2015)	Siren has distant ancestry to the ancient Shifter race of the dark dimension of Thule. With powers over illusion and shape-changing as well as hydrokinesis, Hila infiltrate and usurped Atlantis from Arthur Curry while masquerading as her sister Mera on its overlord's behalf.
Slud-Jak	The Unexpected #178 (March 1977)	Tentacled semi-humanoid whose telepathic commands to undersea creatures could override Aquaman's; angered by the surface world's pollution of the ocean, it sent undersea creatures to attack swimmers at a beach, but was eventually placated.
Starro	The Brave and the Bold #28 (March 1960)	A highly-advanced starfish-like alien with a single central eye and prehensile extremities. Starro is the first villain to face the original Justice League, including Aquaman, in the team's debut story "Starro the Conqueror".
Stavros Markos	Adventure Comics #464 (July 1979)	Greek shipping magnate, sought to loot Atlantis.
Stellor	Aquaman #16 (July 1964)	Extraterrestrial criminal, led a gang of shape-changing aliens.
Sunburst	DC Special Series #1 (September 1977)	Iranian empowered by the mystic Sun Stone, seeks to restore the Persian Empire.
Suvians	Aquaman #4 (July 1962)	Hostile extraterrestrials, used a stone robot in attempt to destroy an Earth town.
Taggert	Aquaman #19 (January 1965)	Unethical showman who enslaved Atlanteans.
Tamerkhan	Aquaman #25 (January 1966)	13th century alchemist, worked for Genghis Khan, developed a formula to keep himself and others alive over centuries, clashed with Aquaman upon his revival.
Thanatos	Aquaman #54	Thanatos is a dark, evil twin of Aquaman. He inhabits an "other-dimensional realm" known as "Netherspace" that is a kind of reverse Purgatory, where beings known as the "Others" keep entities until they are filled with sufficient evil to be returned to our dimension. Killed by Major Disaster, who mistook Thanatos for Aquaman.
Thesily	Aquaman (vol. 5) #6 (May 1992)	Was bequeathed the Atlantean throne in Aquaman's place, but proved a poor ruler who grew jealous of the following Orin still held with his former subjects. Subsequently attempted to have him and his illegitimate son, Koryak, assassinated, only to be killed in an accident, crushed to death when quakes caused by the meteor which sank Atlantis made part of his palace fall on top of him.
Thirst	Aquaman (vol. 4) #5	The Thirst is a golem composed of dry river mud, the mystical "brother" of an ancient goddess called the Waterbearer. The Thirst has preyed on the deities who have watched over the Secret Sea, a metaphysical realm composed of the shared imagination of humanity, for millennia, absorbing their power. When Aquaman became guardian of the Secret Sea, the Thirst set his sights on Aquaman.
Thule	Aquaman (vol. 7) #43 (October 2015)	A clandestine order of dark mystics who ruled old Atlantis through profiteering off of its constant state of war and strife. When King Atlan ceased all infighting and brought both the Seven Kingdoms and the world under his banner, their power had been greatly undermined; threatened by this, they used the turmoil of the deposed king's sinking of Atlantis to create a separate kingdom a world away where they could rule unopposed. Millennia later, the spells separating the Thule from Earth began to weaken, after which they enacted their eons-old plan of invading the other world to claim it as their own.
Tiamat	Aquaman (vol. 5) #15 (December 1995)	Giant extraterrestrial reptilian, rampaged in Washington, D.C.
Tiros	Aquaman #12 (November 1963)	Tyrant of the planet Sidius, abducted Aquaman and Aqualad for gladiatorial games.
T.N.T. Dillon	Adventure Comics #226 (July 1956)	Explosives-using criminal who fought the Golden Age Aquaman.
Tom Lariar	Adventure Comics #170 (November 1951)	Used a telepathic machine to command fish to commit crimes before being defeated by the Golden Age Aquaman.
Toxin	Aquaman (vol. 5) #32 (May 1997)	Toxic waste-using terrorist, fought by Aquaman and the Swamp Thing.
The Trench	Aquaman (vol. 7) #1 (June 2012)	Formerly Atlanteans, now a race of vicious, cannibalistic, ocean-dwelling humanoid fish-like creatures that rose from their domain beneath the ocean floor (revealed to be the Third Kingdom of the Seven Seas) in search of food and devoured anything that stood in their way.
Trino	Showcase #30 (January 1961)	Leader of an invasion force of extradimensional amphibious aliens.
Triton	Aquaman (vol. 5) Annual #1 (1995)	Triton is the son of Poseidon in the DC Universe. He is thus part of the Olympian Pantheon and is the god of tides and winds. Aquaman and Triton are both rulers of the sea and Triton has actually challenged Aquaman for title of King of the Sea.
Un-Thing	Aquaman #24 (November/December 1965)	A member of the Terrible Trio who could turn invisible when underwater.
Urcell	Aquaman (vol. 8) #23 (July 2017)	Former second in command of the xenophobic Deluge terror cell turned Drift Commander of Atlantis during the Rath regime, quick to turn on the new king when his abuse of magic corrupted him, ending in beating a retreat into obscurity after Atlantis had risen from the depths. Now a defector, she was later killed during an attempted coup against Queen Mera after having contacted the Suicide Squad for aid in returning her home to the ocean, wherein Lord Satanis felt she outlived her usefulness towards the mission and slew her using one of the Silent Schools mystic weapons.
V'lana	Action Comics #539 (January 1983)	Current Queen of Xebel, a kingdom located in Dimension Aqua, and enemy of Queen Mera.
Wackyman	Adventure Comics #233 (February 1957)	Wackyman was a clown who chose Aquaman as his motif for comedy. He designed a costume similar to that of Aquaman and robots in the form of aquatic creatures to use in his act.
Warhead	Aquaman (vol. 8) #16 (February 2017)	Chinese citizen turned cybernetic military operator, remodeled by the Ministry of Self-Reliance. Sought to control Aquaman through his unique blend of telepathy and technopathy to elude his creators and contractors, instead offered sanctuary by Aquaman to aid in his recovery.
Weisbogg	Adventure Comics #436 (November 1974)	Used a robot duplicate of Aquaman in a plot against him.
Wylie	Aquaman (vol. 4) #9 (August 1992)	Unscrupulous Merrevale oil executive, ordered Aquaman assassinated.
Xen	Aquaman #27 (May 1966)	Extraterrestrial who abducted sentient beings, including Aquaman and Mera, for his intergalactic aquarium.
Yascom	More Fun Comics #82 (August 1942)	One of many wartime prisoners on Convict Island, he declared himself king when the prisoners took over the island before being defeated by the Golden Age Aquaman.

== Villains from comics in other media ==
A number of villains from the comic books have appeared in Aquaman-related media.

Villain	First appearance	Portrayed / Voiced by
DC Extended Universe
David Kane Black Manta	Aquaman (2018)	Yahya Abdul-Mateen II
Orm Marius Ocean Master	Aquaman (2018)	Patrick Wilson
Nereus	Aquaman (2018)	Dolph Lundgren
Karshon	Aquaman and the Lost Kingdom (2023)	Indya Moore
Kordax	Aquaman and the Lost Kingdom (2023)	Pilou Asbæk
Other franchises
The Fisherman	Batman: The Brave and the Bold "Aquaman's Outrageous Adventure!" (2010)	Dee Bradley Baker
Siren	DC Super Hero Girls: Legends of Atlantis (2018)	Erica Lindbeck

== Related lists ==
- List of Aquaman supporting characters
- List of Batman family enemies
- List of Superman enemies
- List of Wonder Woman enemies
- List of Green Lantern enemies
