= Siren (comics) =

Siren, in comics, may refer to:

- One of two DC Comics characters
  - Siren (DC Comics)
  - Hila (comics)
- Siren (Malibu Comics), a character in Malibu Comics Ultraverse
- Siren (Image Comics), a series from Image Comics

== See also ==
- Siren (disambiguation)
- Siryn, a Marvel Comics character
