= Garth (comics) =

DC Comics superhero

- Tempest (DC Rebirth version); Character design by Brett Booth.

Publication information
- Publisher: DC Comics
- First appearance: As Aqualad: Adventure Comics #269 (February 1960); As Tempest: Tempest #2 (December 1996)
- Created by: Aqualad: Robert Bernstein; Ramona Fradon; Tempest: Phil Jimenez

In-story information
- Alter ego: Garth
- Species: Atlantean
- Team affiliations: Teen Titans; Sentinels of Magic
- Partnerships: Aquaman; Donna Troy; Aquagirl; Omen (Lilith Clay); Dolphin
- Supporting character of: Aquaman
- Notable aliases: Aqualad, Tempest, Marine Marvel, Garth of Atlantis, Son of the Seven Seas
- Abilities: Atlantean physiology that grants him superhuman physical attributes (strength, speed, endurance, agility) necessary to survive the deep depths of the ocean as well as possessing night vision and can breathe underwater.; Vast sorcerous abilities due to heritage (mystic senses, telepathy, teleportation, astral projection, telekinesis, hydrokinesis, etc.); Encyclopedic knowledge of the history of Atlantis; Skilled hand-to-hand combatant and proficiency in different weaponry.; Skilled diplomat and politician

Garth is a superhero appearing in American comic books published by DC Comics. Created by Robert Bernstein and artist Ramona Fradon, He first appears in Adventure Comics #269 (February 1960). The character is commonly associated with both Aquaman and the Teen Titans alongside the team's various incarnations.

Garth began as the teenaged sidekick and protégé of Aquaman, who is his adoptive father. The first character to use the Aqualad codename, Garth was a full-blooded Atlantean prince from the Idyllist tribe, consisting of pacifists. Atlantean superstitious nature made them believe infant Garth was connected to an evil lineage due to having purple eyes and was cast out, but found by Aquaman. He eventually came to befriend several other sidekicks and was a founding member of the Teen Titans. Once considered among the weaker members, his magical powers awakened, as did his potential of becoming a powerful sorcerer. As a young adult, Garth instead used the codename Tempest and became a formidable Atlantean sorcerer, standing on equal footing with his former mentor. He served Atlantis in several political capacities, and eventually fathered Cerdian with fellow Aquaman ally, Dolphin.

After the New 52 reboot, the character was reinvented and depicted as an elite soldier and a dropout of a prestigious Atlantean school of sorcery whose Idyllist heritage instead granted him an encyclopedia knowledge of Atlantis but experienced Atlantean xenophobia against them. Gradually, many aspects of his prior history was restored and merged with the newer history, including his relation with Aquaman, the Teen Titans, and his fatherhood. Once more serving his mentor and Atlantis in several capacities, he eventually meets his successor Jackson Hyde, whom he passes the Aqualad codename to.

Garth has made several appearances as both Aqualad and Tempest in various media. As Aqualad, he appears in the animated series Teen Titans and Batman: The Brave and the Bold. He made his live-action debut in the second season of the DC Universe series Titans, portrayed by Drew Van Acker. As Tempest, Garth appears in the Young Justice animated series.

== Publication history ==
Aqualad first appeared in 1960 in Adventure Comics #269 and was created by Robert Bernstein and Ramona Fradon. In 1996, Aqualad appeared in his own four-issue limited series under a new alias: Tempest. In the 2009–2010 miniseries, Blackest Night, Tempest is murdered in battle.

== Fictional character biography ==
Garth is the prince and heir to the throne of the Idyllists, a colony of Atlanteans who settled in the Hidden Valley 4,000 years ago. Prior to Garth's birth, his parents, King Thar and Queen Berra, became the reigning monarchs of Shayeris, the capital of the Hidden Valley. Thar's brother, Zath, practiced dark sorcery and necromancy and was eventually banished from the Hidden Valley. Zath renamed himself Slizzath and returned to Shayeris twenty years later, plotting to conquer the Hidden Valley.

Thar attempts to stop Slizzath, but is killed by Idyllist radicals. Before Thar is killed, he casts a spell that traps Slizzath in another dimension. However, the spell is linked to a ritual that gives Thar's offspring the potential to free Slizzath. Babies born with purple eyes, the Idyllist mark of power, are banished and killed to prevent them from freeing Slizzath.

In Poseidonis, one of the domed cities of Atlantis, Queen Berra gives birth to Garth, who is born with purple eyes. The Atlanteans claim Garth had been born genetically inferior and sentence him to death on a seabed far away from Atlantis. It has been speculated that Garth survived with the assistance of Aquaman's father, the Atlantean sorcerer Atlan.

=== Prince, Sidekick, and Titan ===
The founding members of the Teen Titans: Wonder Girl, Robin, Kid Flash, and Garth as Aqualad. Cover art for Teen Titans: Year One #1, by Karl Kerschl.

The orphaned Garth is saved by Aquaman at the age of 12 and becomes his sidekick Aqualad. When Aquaman becomes king of Atlantis, Garth automatically becomes prince, as he is Aquaman's adopted son and heir. After Aquaman marries Mera and has his own son, known as Aquababy, adventuring with Aqualad became less important to him, leaving Garth feeling unsure of his role in his mentor's life. Seeking to be of help to other teens in trouble, Garth becomes a founding member of the Teen Titans.

While on a quest to assist Aquaman, Garth is kidnapped and forced to fight a giant sea beast to the death, surviving just long enough for Aquaman to defeat the monster. Garth is later forced to defend himself in a life or death struggle against his mentor over the survival of the infant Arthur Jr. (also known as Aquababy). Betrayed and abandoned by Aquaman, Garth stays in the Hidden Valley to search for links to his identity, eventually learning that he is the lost prince of the Idyllists.

Also as a teenager, Garth meets and falls in love with Aquagirl (Tula), the ward of Aquaman's predecessor, King Juvor. They dated for years, aiding Aquaman as defenders of the undersea realms, until Tula's death at the hands of Chemo during Crisis on Infinite Earths. Grief-stricken, Garth leaves Atlantis, rejoins the Teen Titans, and cuts ties with Aquaman.

=== Tempest ===
Some time later, Garth encounters a band of shark-like merpeople who attack him with mystic water. Garth is transported to another dimension, where Atlan trains him. Atlan teaches Garth to use powers he previously did not know existed, including elemental powers which allowed him to heat and cool water and create whirlpools, as well as fiery purple blasts of energy from his eyes. Atlan tells Garth that the final part of his training was to complete the ritual that would grant him full access to his ancestral magical power, and thus Garth had to return to Shayeris, in the Hidden Valley.

When Garth returns to Shayeris, he finds the city overtaken by undead creatures and encounters Aquagirl, who has been resurrected by Slizzath. Together with Letifos (one of the shark warriors), Atlan, and Aquagirl, Garth descends into Shayeris. While Garth attempts to perform the ritual, Aquagirl attacks him and takes his energy to summon Slizzath. Garth destroys Aquagirl and returns Slizzath to his prison, assuming the mantle of Tempest.

=== Family ===
Tempest returns to Atlantis, where he becomes the city's ambassador to the United Nations. Aquaman's lover, Dolphin, leaves him for Tempest; the two soon marry and have a son named Cerdian. At the same time, Tempest joins a new incarnation of his old team, the Titans. He quits the Titans due to Dolphin believing that he cannot balance his duties as a hero and his duties as a father and husband.

During the Infinite Crisis event, Tempest attempts to channel the magic of all the Atlantean soldiers to undo a spell that turned Mera into an air-breather. The Spectre senses Tempest's magic and attacks Atlantis, with Tempest being presumed dead.

=== One Year Later ===
In "One Year Later" storyline, Tempest is revealed to have survived and is found by Cal Durham and the people of Sub Diego. He has been rendered amnesiac and lost his powers, no longer being able to use magic or breathe underwater. In Final Crisis, Garth recovers and assists Hawkgirl and Green Lantern in attacking Checkmate's castle.

Garth later returns to Atlantis to aid his friend, Letifos, in rebuilding the city. He decides to have a private celebration for Dolphin and Cerdian, claiming that even if they survived the Spectre's attack, they were surely buried in the rubble of Atlantis. Inspired by Dick Grayson and Letifos, Tempest crowns himself new king of Atlantis, waiting for Mera to return and guide the survivors.

=== Blackest Night ===
In Blackest Night #2, Garth visits Aquaman's grave with Mera to relocate his remains to Atlantis, but they are interrupted by Aquaman, Tula, and Dolphin; now reanimated as Black Lanterns. A conflict ensues, during which Garth is killed and reanimated as a Black Lantern. Soon afterwards, Tempest and other Black Lantern Titans appear to attack the Titans. They follow Dawn Granger, the current Dove, to Titans Tower, where more Black Lantern Titans are attacking the living heroes.

Holly Granger (Dawn's sister, who had shortly beforehand been killed and transformed into a Black Lantern) confronts Dove, overwhelming her and attempting to take her heart. Dove suddenly radiates a white energy that destroys Holly's body and severs her connection to her ring. Dove then turns the light on the other Black Lanterns, destroying all but Hank Hall, Tempest, and Terra, who quickly retreat. Garth is later seen in Coast City, where he is destroyed by the Atom and Atrocitus.

=== The New 52 and beyond ===
Following the 2011 "Flashpoint" storyline and the subsequent New 52 reboot of the DC Comics continuity, Garth does not appear for some time. He is reintroduced as part of an elite force assembled by Siren to hunt down Aquaman, alongside King Shark, Scylla, Charybdis, and Ch'tok. Later, Garth is made director of communications of the Atlantean embassy on land.

The series Titans Hunt (2015–2016) establishes that Garth was a member of the Teen Titans, but he and the other members had their memories of the group erased for their own safety. After the events of DC Rebirth, Garth is once again part of an older Titans team which includes Nightwing, Arsenal, Donna Troy, Lilith Clay, and the newly returned Wally West. Wally's return helps the other members of the group recover their memories.

The series World's Finest: Teen Titans (2023–2024) revealed that Garth is sexually fluid, and dealing with this as a teenager led to problems in his romantic relationship with Donna Troy.

== Character overview ==
=== Family lineage ===
A reoccurring theme in Garth's character is his familial connections and its impact on his life, mirroring Aquaman in some aspects. The biological son of Idyllist monarchs Thar and Berra, his relationship with both are strained due to their choice in abandoning him and reserves a low opinion of them. With Slizzath as his uncle, Garth witnesses his uncle and father battle, fulfilling a reoccurring theme within the DC Universe's Atlantean history where brothers battle for political power, not unlike his adoptive family members, Aquaman and Ocean Master.

The character is also believed to be a descendant of Garn Daanuth, making him distantly related to Arion and Zatanna.

== Powers and abilities ==
As an Atlantean, he possess their shared attributes of powers granted by their physiology: he is able to breathe underwater indefinitely, possesses superhuman physical abilities that allows him to freely move underwater and withstand the pressures of the deep ocean. He can survive at depths of up to 3,400 feet below surface level. His body contains fluids that adjust to give him buoyancy at varying depths. His body also produces gases that push out against the ocean pressures as heavily as they push in, preventing him from being crushed at great depths. His body is also highly impervious to physical injury. His bloodstream is filled with an amino acid that keeps his body from freezing in the ocean depths, although his own temperature is naturally quite high, allowing his muscles the heat they need to swim at such high speeds. Tempest can swim at speeds of 73.86 knots (or 85 mph). Tempest has excellent close range vision and he can see particularly well in low light. His sense of hearing is particularly acute, although, because the rate sound travels on dry land is different than beneath the water, his hearing is directly linked to his vision. He also has a powerful sense of smell. Tempest is amphibious and is able to breathe under water by extracting oxygen from the water through tiny pores in his skin.

As the alleged descendant of the evil ancient Atlantean demigod Garn Daanuth, he possess magical powers that are the result of mystic energies of his magical ancestors mixing with their genetic line. His magical powers allow him to perform a myriad of abilities such as his psionic ability to generate extreme temperatures of cold or heat in bodies of water, project optic blasts powerful enough to stun or knock a gray whale unconscious and kill a normal human being although he can alter its lethal intent. Other magical abilities include mystical senses, telepathy, telekinesis, dimensional traveling, demonic summoning, and ability to commune with entities connected to the elemental force known as the Blue (or Clear). After the New 52 reboot, Garth's purple eyes denote a line of Atlanteans whose powers include having an encyclopedic memory of Atlantis' history.

In addition to his super-powers, Garth is considered a skilled warrior adept with various weaponry and hand-to-hand combat. He is also considered intelligent and a competent ambassador. At a young age, Garth exceeded in academics. Garth also possesses a vast amount of wealth due to his royal connections, once having served as the Titan's chief financer. As an ambassador, he also has a level of diplomatic immunity.

=== Weaknesses ===
As with all other Atlanteans, Garth dehydrates at a faster rate than humans. Originally, the character was expressed to be able to survive for one hour although later versions of this character lacked a specified time limit before the character could dehydrate while on dry air. Despite having enhanced senses, Garth is partially color blind, unable to distinguish between black, green, and blue.

== Other versions ==
- On Earth-15, a world where sidekicks have taken on their mentors' identities, an older version of Garth has been shown to have taken up the mantle of Aquaman. He is subsequently killed by Superman-Prime.
- In the Elseworlds series Kingdom Come, Garth is depicted as the future protector of Atlantis, "Aquaman". He marries Debbie Perkins (aka Deep Blue), and they have a daughter, Tula (Aquagirl).
- In Flashpoint, Artemis frames Garth for the death of Hippolyta on the wedding day of Aquaman and Wonder Woman. Garth is killed by Philippus before he can tell Aquaman that Artemis was collaborating with Orm.
- An alternate universe version of Garth as Tempest appears in Teen Titans: Earth One. This version is a human who gained fish-like abilities from experimentation by S.T.A.R. Labs.

== In other media ==
=== Television ===
Garth / Aqualad (left) as he appears in Teen Titans.

Garth as he appears in Young Justice.

Drew Van Acker as Garth / Aqualad in Titans.

- Garth as Aqualad appears in The Superman/Aquaman Hour of Adventure, voiced by Jerry Dexter.
- Garth as Aqualad appears in Teen Titans (2003), voiced by Wil Wheaton. This version is an honorary member of the Teen Titans and a founding member of Titans East.
- Garth as Aqualad appears in the Robot Chicken episode "They Took My Thumbs", voiced by Clare Grant.
- Garth as Aqualad appears in the Batman: The Brave and the Bold episode "Sidekicks Assemble!", voiced by Zack Shada as a teenager and by Zachary Gordon as a child. This version is resentful of the praise that Aquaman receives.
- Garth appears in Young Justice, voiced by Yuri Lowenthal. This version is Kaldur'ahm's best friend who was offered to join Aquaman as his pupil, but declined to become a student of the Atlantean Conservatory of Sorcery. Additionally, Garth joined the Team in between the first and second seasons, but left following Tula's death. In the third season, Young Justice: Outsiders, Garth becomes an ambassador for Atlantis at the United Nations.
- Garth as Aqualad appears in Teen Titans Go! (2013), voiced again by Wil Wheaton.
- Garth as Aqualad appears in Titans, portrayed by Drew Van Acker. This version is a founding member of the original iteration of the Titans who possesses hydrokinesis and is attracted to Donna Troy, with whom he has a one-night stand before she returns to Themyscira without telling him. Furious, he confronts her at the airport, where they profess their love for each other. Garth later sacrifices himself to save Troy's Amazon handler Jillian from Deathstroke.
- Garth as Aqualad appears in DC Super Hero Girls, voiced by Jessica McKenna. This version is a student at Metropolis High School, a member of the "Invincibros" whose last name is "Bernstein", and a late bloomer with a preteen voice and appearance at the age of 15.

=== Film ===
- The Teen Titans (2003) incarnation of Garth / Aqualad makes a non-speaking cameo appearance in Teen Titans: Trouble in Tokyo.
- The Flashpoint incarnation of Garth makes a non-speaking cameo appearance in Justice League: The Flashpoint Paradox as a member of Aquaman's army.
- Garth as Aqualad makes a non-speaking cameo appearance in Teen Titans Go! To the Movies.
- Garth as Tempest makes a cameo appearance in Justice League: Crisis on Infinite Earths.

=== Video games ===
- Garth as Tempest appears as an unlockable character in Aquaman: Battle for Atlantis.
- Garth as Aqualad appears as a character summon in Scribblenauts Unmasked: A DC Comics Adventure.
- The Young Justice incarnation of Garth as Tempest appears as a playable character in Young Justice: Legacy, voiced again by Yuri Lowenthal.
- Garth appears as an unlockable character in DC Legends.

=== Miscellaneous ===
- Parodies of Aquaman and Aqualad named Mermaid Man and Barnacle Boy appear in SpongeBob SquarePants.
- The Teen Titans (2003) incarnation of Garth / Aqualad appears in Teen Titans Go! (2004). Additionally, a villainous, alternate universe version of Aqualad, Tempest, appears in issue #48 as a member of the Teen Tyrants.
