= Mera (character) =

Fictional superhero character

- Textless variant cover of Mera: Queen of Atlantis #1 (April 2018). Art by Stanley “Artgerm” Lau.

Publication information
- Publisher: DC Comics
- First appearance: Aquaman #11 (September 1963)
- Created by: Jack Miller; Nick Cardy

In-story information
- Alter ego: Mera
- Species: Xebellian (current); Alien (former)
- Place of origin: Xebel (current); Dimension Aqua (original)
- Team affiliations: Justice League; Justice League United; Red Lantern Corps; The Others; Aquaman Family; Royal Family of Atlantis; Royal Family of Xebel
- Partnerships: Aquaman; Ocean Master; Wonder Woman
- Notable aliases: Aquawoman; Dead Water; Princess of Xebel; Queen of Atlantis
- Abilities: Xebellian physiology grants her abilities including breathing underwater, superhuman strength, superhuman durability, enhanced senses, able to swim at extreme speed, and hydrokinesis; Expert hand-to-hand combatant and martial artist specializing in Atlantean-related combat disciplines, proficiency in politics, and a genius-level intellect.

Altered in-story information for adaptations to other media
- Alter ego: Y'Mera Xebella Challa

Mera, sometimes also known as Aquawoman, is a superhero appearing in American comic books published by DC Comics. Created by Jack Miller and Nick Cardy, the character first appeared in Aquaman #11 (September 1963). She serves as the chief love interest and a recurring supporting cast member of Aquaman and his related titles.

A royal native of the extradimensional, oceanic realm of Xebel (originally Dimension Aqua) and a member of the Xebellian sub-race, Mera is often portrayed as a queen consort of Aquaman who possesses natural hydrokinetic abilities. During her publication history, earlier stories often focused on her relationship with Aquaman the mental impact of the untimely death of her son, Arthur Jr. Following revisions to her character from the New 52 onward, she is portrayed as a respected superhero and protector of Atlantis alongside Aquaman with heroic traits and differs from him ideologically due to being native to the ocean. For a time, the character has also served as the chief monarch of Atlantis as the queen regnant, having ascended following Aquaman's abdication of the role during several crises.

The character has been adapted substantially in various media, she was played by Elena Satine on Smallville and most notably featured in the DC Extended Universe where Amber Heard portrayed Mera in Justice League and its director's cut, reprised the role in Aquaman and returned in Aquaman and the Lost Kingdom. The character has also been adapted in the animated Young Justice television series.

== Publication history ==
Queen Mera's Silver Age debut in Aquaman #11 (September 1963) set her place of origin as the mysterious "Dimension Aqua". Aquaman and Mera were married in the first on-camera superhero wedding in comic book history, in Aquaman #18 (Dec 1964).

During the 2011 "Brightest Day" storyline, Dimension Aqua was revealed to be the extradimensional penal colony known formally as "Xebel", a place of exile for an ancient faction of Atlantean people, banished along with their descendants after one of the many civil wars among the survivors of Atlantis following the sinking of the city.

== Fictional character biography ==
Mera Challa is the former Queen of Dimension Aqua, Queen of Atlantis, and wife of DC Comics superhero Aquaman. Mera also has a twin sister named Hila, who turned to villainy.

In her first chronological appearance, Mera is shown to be fleeing the criminal Leron after he usurps control of her kingdom. Arriving on Earth, she meets Aquaman and Aqualad, who vows to help her. Leron captures them, imprisoning Aquaman and Mera in Dimension Aqua. Aided by the water spirit Quisp, Aquaman manages to free Mera and defeats Leron. Mera abdicates her throne, allowing V'lana to become Queen, and returns to Atlantis to marry Aquaman. Soon after, they had a son named Arthur Curry, Jr., also known as Aquababy.

A few years later, Aquaman's mortal enemy Black Manta kidnaps Aquababy and seals him inside a translucent tank designed to suffocate him. Royal advisor Nuidis Vulko sends Mera, desperate to save her son, on an ambitious crusade to her homeworld to find a scientist named Xebel, who has the components for a special healing device that could save her son. When she arrives, she discovers that her kingdom has once again fallen under the rule of Leron, who has taken Xebel hostage, casting him and the device into the Great Pit. Mera braves the pit and defeats Leron and his elemental monsters to retrieve the device. Sadly, she returns to Atlantis too late, finding her son dead.

Although their son's death creates a rift between Aquaman and Mera, they agree to permanently leave Atlantis and travel to a flooded city on the East Coast, intending to start over as a normal couple. However, Aquaman soon leaves to reform the Justice League in Detroit. Becoming more unstable with grief, Mera is returned to Atlantis by Vulko's order and institutionalized. Shortly afterward an alien force of sentient giant jellyfish takes control of the city. During Aquaman's battle to free them, Mera escapes and savagely attacks him, blaming his "weak genes" for their son's death.

While defending himself, Aquaman accidentally impales Mera on a piece of metal. Believing her to be dead, Aquaman has her brought to the royal palace for entombment with the former rulers of Atlantis. Mera is shown to have survived due to the unique physiology of undersea dwellers. Rising from her coffin, she reminds Aquaman how little he knew of her. No longer seeing any reason to remain on Earth, Mera returns to Dimension Aqua and resumes her former duties as Queen.

=== Return of the Queen ===
During Peter David's Aquaman run in the 1990s, Mera is revealed to be in the hellish dimension called the Netherworld, where she is brainwashed by Thanatos, an old enemy of her husband. Time passes differently in the Netherworld and she has apparently had a second son whom she refers to as only "AJ". AJ appears to be about 8–10 years old and it is not known if his father is Aquaman or Thanatos.

Eventually, Mera and AJ break free of Thanatos' control but find that they cannot stay on Earth due to AJ's accelerated aging. Mera and AJ again leave Earth for parts unknown. When next shown later in the series, Mera and AJ are on Oceanid, a water world that is being exploited by aliens for its resources. Mera and AJ team up with Aquaman to defeat the aliens and Mera chooses to stay with her former husband in Atlantis, while AJ remains behind on Oceanid to act as its protector and champion, assuming the role of Aquaman.

Mera and Arthur eventually reconcile, living in Atlantis and continuing to have adventures together, including a trip to Skartaris, where they team up with Travis Morgan, The Warlord. They appear to form a true royal family along with Tempest (Garth) and his wife, Dolphin (Aquaman's former lover). Mera participates in the delivery of Garth and Dolphin's son, Cerdian, during this peaceful time. Unfortunately, the Aqua-family's happiness is cut short due to the events depicted in DC's "Obsidian Age", Infinite Crisis, and "One Year Later" storylines. Arthur's attempts to save Atlantis from destruction by transporting it back into the distant past results in the people of Atlantis suffering fifteen years of slavery, during which time Mera serves as their de facto leader and source of hope. When Atlantis is returned to the present, Mera is duty-bound as queen regent to declare him an enemy of Atlantis and order him to stand trial for treason.

Following these events, Mera is shown leading a rebel faction in the rebuilding of Atlantis, which was destroyed by the Spectre in Infinite Crisis. Mera appears in the Aquaman: Sword of Atlantis series during which Aquaman (having been transformed into the Dweller of the Depths during DC's World War III mini-series) appears to perish. Members of the JLA visit Atlantis to give their condolences and Mera is not referenced in DC comics until the "Prelude to Blackest Night" story in Titans #15, where it is revealed that she is in mourning for Arthur. This story also reveals that Dolphin and Cerdian died during the destruction of Atlantis.

=== "Blackest Night" ===
Red Lantern Mera attacking Wonder Woman. Art by Nicola Scott.

In the "Blackest Night" storyline, at the request of Tempest, Mera reluctantly allows Aquaman's remains to be returned to Atlantis. Before they can do so, they are attacked by Aquaman, Tula, and Dolphin, who have been reanimated as Black Lanterns. Mera and Tempest battle them but are overwhelmed by their power. Tempest is killed by Tula and transformed into a Black Lantern as well. An angry Mera manages to escape and flees to the Hall of Justice. She sends out a distress signal, and Firestorm comes to her aid.

Mera reveals that she was able to evade the Black Lanterns by keeping her emotions in check. The Black Lantern Justice League attacks the group. The Atom helps the heroes escape via a phone line. The Flash tells Atom and Mera that they are the Justice League now. Atom and Mera meet up with the Justice Society, who are battling Black Lanterns. After battling and being nearly killed by a Black Lantern-powered Wonder Woman, Mera is chosen as a deputy officer of the Red Lantern Corps to battle Nekron's forces.

A rampaging Mera encounters Wonder Woman, who has been transformed into a Star Sapphire by a duplicate of Carol Ferris' ring, and attacks her. During the fight, their two rings interface, with the violet ring giving Mera some measure of self-control and the red ring giving Wonder Woman with an insight into the reasons for Mera's rage. Mera is approached by Aquaman, who now has the reanimated corpse of their child. Aquaman attempts to use their son against her, but Mera states, "I never wanted children," and destroys the Black Lantern version of Arthur Jr. Mera then shows a desire to hunt down Aquaman and destroy him. Following Nekron's destruction, Aquaman is restored to life by the white light. The sight of Arthur alive calms Mera down, breaking her connection to the red ring and causing her to go into cardiac arrest without it. Carol and Saint Walker use their combined lights to heal Mera, who reunites with Aquaman.

=== "Brightest Day" ===
==== New origins ====
In the 2009–2010 "Brightest Day" storyline, Mera's origin is revisited with new revelations, expanding upon some elements and writing off others as deceptions and lies fed to Aquaman by Mera herself. Instead of being the Queen of Dimension Aqua, Mera is now the older princess of Xebel, a forgotten extradimensional penal colony for an ancient group of separatist Atlanteans, banished behind a sealed portal in the Bermuda Triangle.

Trained since birth, along with her sister Siren, Mera was sent by the King of Xebel, who was unable to send more than one soldier at a time through a small fissure in spacetime to the main universe. They were to confront the current King of Atlantis and kill him in retaliation for the exile of their common people. However, the plan backfired when Mera fell truly in love with Arthur, deliberately choosing to keep claiming her cover story as her real past to avoid frictions with him. However, on several occasions, like Aquababy's death, Mera's deep-seated hatred for Atlantis and its royal family was re-ignited, sparking the bouts of apparent insanity and angry lashing at her husband for his "weakness". It is also hinted that Black Manta had a long-lasting feud with Xebel's people; despite Aquaman believing for years to have been the cause of Aquababy's death, Mera still thinks that her son was killed to get back at her birth family.

During one of the several attempts to escape en masse from the Bermuda Triangle portal, the people of Xebel are ordered to capture and experiment on several land-dwellers, including the future Black Manta. During these experiments, Kaldur'ahm, the son of Black Manta and an unnamed woman, was born. While Mera's father wanted to experiment on Kaldur'ahm, Mera took pity on him and took him to live on the surface, where he was named Jackson Hyde. Years later, Kaldur'ahm is targeted by the army of Xebel, forcing Mera to return in his aid.

==== Present day ====
Following the "Blackest Night" storyline, Aquaman ponders the mystery of his resurrection, disturbed by the recent events, despite Mera's attempts to comfort him. While cleaning up an oil spill, they are attacked by soldiers from Mera's homeworld led by Siren, who bears a striking resemblance to Mera, who reveals that she was sent to kill him, proceeding to confess her real origins to him.

She also hints that, despite the long-lasting exile of her people, Xebel's soldiers had been enemies of Black Manta himself from a distant time, even preceding the first public appearance of Aquaman, and states that, despite Mera's original mission being a "solo" one, Siren is now backed by the entire "Death Squad", elite Xebel soldiers at the orders of the acting princess. Mera reveals that Siren is her younger sister. After being shown a vision by the Life Entity, Aquaman tells Mera that he must track down a teenaged boy with an eel tattoo. Upon hearing Arthur's description of the boy's appearance, a shocked Mera says she knows who the boy is, prompting Aquaman's search for the boy himself. The boy, Kaldur'ahm, eventually becomes the newest Aqualad.

=== The New 52 relaunch ===
Ivan Reis's rendition of Mera from Aquaman (vol. 7) #12 (2011)

In The New 52, the 2011 relaunch and retcon of DC Comics' entire superhero line, a greatly disillusioned Aquaman, distressed by the rejection faced from his fellow Atlanteans and his poor standing as a superhero, often ridiculed because of his shortcomings and less than glamorous superpowers, decides to return to Amnesty Bay. Mera follows him, helping her husband try to find a new place in the world, despite being saddled from the same ill reputation as the almost useless "Aquawoman", and mistakenly believed to be a mermaid by the general public. Mera has difficulty adjusting to society on the outside world and severe problems controlling her anger. She also aids Arthur and The Others in trying to uncover the mystery behind the sinking of Atlantis and fights against Black Manta, who tries to obtain the ancient artifacts of Atlantis.

It is revealed that Mera had been sent by her father, the King of Xebel to assassinate the King of Atlantis. However, after being impressed by Arthur's nobility, and after uncovering a secret message from her late mother encouraging her to find her own path away from Xebel's restrictive society, she falls in love with and marries him.

Following the "Throne of Atlantis" storyline, Mera is approached by the police force to arrest her again for violent assault following an outburst in town. Mera and the police officers discuss civic virtues, and she is confronted by Officer Watson, who knew Aquaman when they were at school. Watson reasons with Mera and tells her to stop being hostile. She also tells her that she needs to respect the law and society on the surface. As Mera concedes, she and the police officers are attacked with the winter storm by the Dead King who demands her to lead him to Xebel. The Dead King drags Mera to the Bermuda Triangle and opens the Xebel barrier, but Mera manages to escape from the Dead King. When Mera returns to her previous home of Xebel to warn them, it is revealed that she was betrothed to Nereus, the current king of Xebel.

He asks Mera "Where the hell have you been?". Nereus is angered when he discovers Mera is on the side of Atlantis and Aquaman's lover. Mera and Nereus are frozen in ice by the Dead King. Aquaman arrives to free Mera and confronts the Dead King, who turns out to be the first king of Atlantis who plans to rule the Seven Seas once more. During the fight, Mera frees Nereus and Xebel soldiers to help Aquaman against the Dead King, but Nereus and Xebel soldiers bow to the Dead King, claiming that he is the true king of the Seven Seas.

When Mera and Aquaman escape from Xebel soldiers and arrive at Atlantis, it is under attack by Scavenger and his men. Aquaman tells Atlantean to fall back using his physical force ability to summon the Kraken that attacked Scavenger's men. However, Aquaman is unconscious when the Dead King and Xebel soldiers arrive. Aquaman revives with Vulko on the surface world, but Vulko reveals to him that he has been in a coma for six months. Aquaman asks what happened to Mera after six months; Vulko said he saw Mera was facing the Dead King.

Later, Mera is imprisoned by the Dead King and Xebel soldiers are controlling Atlantis. Mera refuses to marry Nereus and warns that she will kill him if she is released. Aquaman arrives to free Mera and the Atlanteans, and they battle the Dead King and Xebel soldiers. When the Dead King is destroyed, Nereus and Xebel soldiers retreat, and Mera reunites with Aquaman and decides to remain in Atlantis. Mera is often left in command of Atlantis while Arthur confronts external threats or attends to his superheroic duties. Initially unpopular, she wins the support of Atlantis' Council of Elders and the respect of the people for her courage and competent handling of domestic issues. She also accompanies Arthur on his quest to find his mother, Atlanna, who is revealed to have faked her death.

When buildings and war machines from Thule, an alternate version of Atlantis in a parallel reality, Arthur leaves Mera in charge of Atlantis while he goes to resolve the crisis. Arthur learns that, as well as the invasion forces, refugees are also crossing over from Thule. Arthur chooses to allow the incursions to continue rescuing as many innocents as possible, even though the incursions are poisoning the seas. This leads to Mera seemingly turning on him and declaring him an enemy of the state. The "Mera" in charge of Atlantis is revealed to be her sister Siren, who has imprisoned the real Mera. Mera is able to free herself and easily overpower Siren as Arthur is attempting to rescue her. The pair reunite and join the Justice League in rescuing as many refugees from Thule as possible, before closing the connection between the two worlds.

The events of Thule's invasion inspire Arthur to open formal diplomatic relations with the surface. He constructs an Atlantean embassy in his hometown of Amnesty Bay, Massachusetts, and names Mera the ambassador. She proves highly adept in the role, becoming a media darling and a popular liaison with law enforcement.

=== DC Rebirth ===
In 2016, DC Comics implemented a relaunch of its books called "DC Rebirth" which restored its continuity to a form much as it was prior to "The New 52". Rather than being Aquaman's wife, Mera is now his fiancé but is still Atlantis' ambassador to the surface. Post-Rebirth, Xebel is no longer concealed behind a magical barrier and is accessible from Atlantis. When she was a child, Mera's father took her to view Atlantis from a distance. He told her to see Atlantis for what it could be, not what it was, however, all the young princess felt was anger.

To marry Arthur, Mera is required to spend months in seclusion with the Widowhood, an order of priestesses whose husbands and sons died in service to Atlantis. The widows attempt to divine Mera's future, and foresee that she will be a great queen, yet also that she will doom Atlantis and the surface as the "Fatal Queen" when Arthur dies shortly into his reign and Mera is driven mad with anguish.

Mera stars in a limited series that began in February 2018 and concluded in July 2018 in which she defeats Ocean Master and becomes Queen of Atlantis. Her first crisis as queen is an operation by the Suicide Squad to sink Atlantis, which has temporarily risen above the waves.

As queen, Mera attempts to improve the lives of the people of the Ninth Tride, Atlantis' lowest district, both physically and socially. She pardons Vulko for his acts of treason and appoints him her chief adviser. Although Vulko loyally carries out her wishes, she is met by reluctance and outright resistance from her other counselors, who accept the considerable inequality of Atlantis as part of the natural order. Mera comes to believe that Atlantis and the other undersea civilization's systems of the absolute monarchy has failed their people, and decides to call a council with her fellow monarchs to dissolve the undersea monarchies, leaving recorded instructions to that effect for Vulko in case she is incapacitated.

Although the Widowhood installed Mera on the throne she frequently comes into conflict with their leader Reverend Mother Cetea, who repeatedly tries to guide Mera into ruling in the manner of a more traditional Atlantean monarch rather than the notoriously independent-minded Queen's own style. She also insists that Mera marry to ensure the succession, yet also refuses to allow Arthur to become king again. Mera declares her intention to marry Vulko, as any other potential suitor would seek to control her. She also stalls by insisting that the royal wedding be meticulously planned to the last detail.

Black Manta destroys an Atlantean historical site to provoke a confrontation with Mera and the recently resurrected Arthur. Mera, along with Arthur, Jackson Hyde, and Arthur's new ally Tristan Maurer successfully fight off Manta, who is equipped with a mecha provided by Lex Luthor. Mera joins her powers with Jackson to create a gigantic, bioelectric powered water construct of herself, destroying the mecha, however, the strain of the immense hydrokinetic power Mera is forced to use puts her in a coma, and she gives birth to her daughter Andy shortly after.

Mera remains comatose for ten months, during which time Vulko, acting as regent, is unable to govern as he lacks legitimacy, being merely Mera's fiancé rather than her husband. Without Mera to force the issue, her counselors neglect the Ninth Tride, currently wracked by a mystery epidemic. This abandonment by the authorities fuels resentment and allows the returned Ocean Master to recruit followers and stir up discontent among the people with impunity. Vulko attempts to carry out Mera's recorded instructions, however, the other monarchs refuse to come to Atlantis unless invited by Mera. Vulko sets a date for him to marry the still unconscious Mera, as the monarchs will be required to attend a royal wedding. The day before the wedding, Mera regains consciousness and orders the entire Windowhood arrested without charge to prevent their interference. At the ceremony, Mera reveals to the assembled monarchs that she is awake and announces her plan to end the monarchies. Orm, present in his capacity as King of Dagon, orders his fleet to attack Atlantis.

Orm and his forces are stopped by Aquaman, assisted by the Justice league and the Sea gods. Following this, Mera finally embraces her daughter, as she and Arthur settle down in Amnesty Bay. Soon afterwards Mera and Arthur marry in the presence of their family and friends, in what was originally planned as a welcome back party for her.

Following the abolition of the monarchy, Arthur and Mera intended to hold themselves apart from Atlantis to allow the city to govern itself, but they were forced to intervene when the Frost King's forces attacked the city during what was intended to be their honeymoon. Arthur journeyed into the city's heating vents to meet with the Fire Trolls who lived in the tunnels below Atlantis, hoping they could be an ally against the Frost King. Originally Mera agreed to stay behind to guard Andy but quickly followed him, arriving in time to save Arthur from a Fire Troll with a hydrokinetic attack. The Trolls were in awe of this and swore loyalty to her. With her army of Fire Trolls, Mera and Arthur defeat the ice creatures attacking Atlantis.

== Characterization ==
In modern characterizations, Mera is described as a superhero of her own right and protector of Atlantis who differ from Aquaman in ideology. While more reluctant in accepting the "surface-dwellers", she is a reluctant defender with belief of a future involving lasting peace between humanity and Atlanteans alike. The character is also regarded as a highly-capable warrior, considered the most powerful "aqua-kinetic" recorded in the fictional history of Atlantis, able to battle the Justice League, and has sometimes been regarded as surpassing Aquaman. In some media, her abilities are connected to mystical forces and is described as a sorceress.

=== Relationships ===
Aquaman serves as her chief love interest although their relationship has varied; married to him shortly after meeting, the pair has had children with one another, including Arthur Curry Jr. (also known as Aquababy) and Arthur "A.J." Joseph Curry. After divorcing Aquaman for a time, she becomes romantically involved with King Noble, a rival king from the Lurkers Kingdom. Following the New 52, the characters were originally not married but had a close romantic relationship. Stories eventually developed towards a wedding and had re-married the characters and birthed Andrina Curry, whom inherited traits from Mera. She was also originally the fiancé of warlord King Nereus although she harbor little actual romantic interest in him and the pair became political and personal adversaries. Frequent foes also includes vengeful twin Siren and brother-in-law Ocean Master, the latter whom she has also reluctantly team up with numerous times.

Within popular media, some of the aforementioned characters varied in her relationship with them; King Nereus has sometimes instead been cast as her biological father. Ocean Master has also been the character's love interest in the DC Extended Universe.

== Powers and abilities ==
Mera using her hydrokinetic powers in the cover of Aquaman vol 7 #6. Art by Ivan Reis.

Due to her heritage, Mera shares the superhuman attributes characteristic of other Xebellians at a heightened level due to her royal heritage, including superhuman strength and speed (especially while swimming), durability on a near-bulletproof level, and the ability to breathe both on land and underwater. On dry land, she possesses more acute senses that include limited night vision derived from her ability to see in the ocean's deep, and enhanced hearing. Her royal heritage also grants her hydrokinetic abilities that allow her to form "hard water" constructs, draw upon any nearby source of moisture (including within living bodies), and sense nearby bodies of water as well as their contents. In addition to her powers, she is an expert in Atlantean-styled martial arts, hand-to-hand combat, and weaponry. She is also a proficient assassin, leader, politician, and possess a genius-level intellect that makes her technologically savant.

In some situations, Mera wield a mystical quintet similar to Aquaman's trident weapons. She temporarily possessed Ocean Master's trident, allowing for control over the weather, magnetic fiends, and heightening her hydrokinesis (granting the power on its own). She also possesses advance technology and built the Central Core, a secret facility in Atlantis housing a supercomputer and spacecraft powered by the Speed Force, the same energies present in DC Comics' speedsters such as the Flash.

=== Weaknesses ===
Due to her heritage, Mera dehydrates at an accelerated rate compared to humans on the surface. Certain magical artifacts such as Ocean Master's crown and similar abilities like cyrokinesis can resist and negate her abilities. Her abilities can also be countered by material able to negate telepathic connections and is vulnerable to hypersonic sounds.

== Reception ==
Mera was ranked 81st in Comics Buyer's Guide's "100 Sexiest Women in Comics" list.

In American Comic Book Chronicles: 1960–64, John Wells says of the Silver Age Mera, "Stripped of her abilities for most of [her] first story, Mera initially came off as something of a damsel in distress. That would change when she returned as a series regular with issue #13. To a general audience that still held the average girl and a growing number of teenage boys, a pretty heroine in a green jumpsuit was more appealing than a magical imp named Quisp."

== Other versions ==
- An alternate timeline version of Mera appears in "Flashpoint". This version was killed by Wonder Woman, prompting Aquaman to declare war on Themyscira.
- An alternate universe version of Mera appears in DC Bombshells. This version is a childhood friend and lover of Wonder Woman.

== In other media ==
=== Television ===
- Mera appears in The Superman/Aquaman Hour of Adventure, voiced by Diane Maddox.
- Mera appears in Justice League, voiced by Kristin Bauer van Straten.
- Mera appears in Batman: The Brave and the Bold, voiced by Sirena Irwin.
- Mera appears in Smallville, portrayed by Elena Satine. This version is initially hostile towards Lois Lane, whom she deems lesser compared to herself, Arthur, Oliver Queen, and Clark Kent until Lois helps them save Arthur, who had been captured while investigating Deathstroke's operations.
- Mera appears in Young Justice, voiced by Kath Soucie. This version is Mera Nereus, an instructor at the Conservatory of Sorcery, later High King of Atlantis, who possesses tentacle-like tattoos that are only visible when she is using her full power.
- Mera appears in Aquaman: King of Atlantis, voiced by Gillian Jacobs.
- Mera appears in the Harley Quinn episode "A Very Problematic Valentine's Day Special", voiced by Janet Varney.

=== Film ===
==== Live-action ====
Amber Heard as Mera as seen in Justice League and its director's cut (top) and Aquaman (bottom)

Mera appears in films set in the DC Extended Universe, portrayed by Amber Heard:

- Introduced in Justice League (2017), this version is Y'Mera Xebella Challa, a sorceress and guardian of a Mother Box before Steppenwolf steals it.
  - Mera also appears in the director's cut, Zack Snyder's Justice League, in which she displays the ability to manipulate blood and sports a British accent.
- Mera appears in Aquaman (2018), Initially betrothed to Orm Marius to secure an alliance between Atlantis and Xebel on her father and Xebel's king Nereus' behalf, she seeks out Arthur Curry to convince him take his place on Atlantis' throne at Nuidis Vulko's behest. Despite initial difficulties, Mera and Curry eventually join forces to find King Atlan's trident and save Atlantis.
- Mera appears in Aquaman and the Lost Kingdom (2023). By this time, she has married Curry, become queen of Atlantis, and given birth to a son named Arthur Jr.

==== Animation ====
- Mera appears in films set in the DC Animated Movie Universe (DCAMU):
  - The Flashpoint incarnation of Mera makes a non-speaking cameo appearance in a flashback in Justice League: The Flashpoint Paradox.
  - Mera appears in Justice League: Throne of Atlantis, voiced by Sumalee Montano. This version is a guard to Queen Atlanna who helps to find and save Arthur Curry before becoming his love interest.
  - Mera makes a non-speaking cameo appearance in The Death of Superman.
  - Mera makes a non-speaking appearance in Justice League Dark: Apokolips War. She participates in the Justice League's failed attempt to destroy Darkseid before being converted into a cyborg Fury and brainwashed to serve him. Two years later, the Furies battle Superman, John Constantine, Raven, Robin, and Etrigan during their second attempt to defeat Darkseid before Constantine frees them.
- Mera appears in Lego DC Comics Super Heroes: Aquaman – Rage of Atlantis, voiced by Susan Eisenberg.
- Mera appears in DC Super Hero Girls: Legends of Atlantis, voiced by Erica Lindbeck.
- Mera appears in Justice League: Crisis on Infinite Earths, voiced by Ashly Burch.

=== Video games ===
- Mera appears as a downloadable playable character in Lego Batman 3: Beyond Gotham.
- Mera appears as a playable character in DC Unchained.
- Mera appears as a character summon in Scribblenauts Unmasked: A DC Comics Adventure.
- Mera appears in Lego DC Super-Villains via the Aquaman DLC.
- Mera appears in DC Battle Arena, voiced by Sandra Espinoza.

=== Miscellaneous ===
- Mera appears in the Injustice: Gods Among Us prequel comic.
- Mera appears in DC Super Hero Girls, voiced by Erica Lindbeck.
- Mera serves as inspiration for "Blue Bayou", a character from The Refrigerator Monologues, written by Catherynne M. Valente.
