= Dolphin (character) =

- Dolphin as depicted in Showcase #79 (December 1968). Art by Jay Scott Pike.

Publication information
- Publisher: DC Comics
- First appearance: Showcase #79 (December 1968)
- Created by: Jay Scott Pike

In-story information
- Alter ego: Alexandra Bernath
- Species: Atlantean (current); Metahuman (alien-altered) (originally)
- Team affiliations: Forgotten Heroes; Black Lantern Corps; Justice League Task Force; Justice League
- Abilities: Artificially adapted for deep subaquatic life: underwater breathing, superhuman strength, speed, durability, stamina, reflexes, resilience to deep water pressures, Aquatic Respiration (originally); Seachanged atlantean physiology: conventional atlantean adaptions, light manipulation, omnifarious shapeshifting, claw retraction, scale manifestation, humanoid camouflage (current)

Dolphin is a superheroine appearing in American comic books published by DC Comics. Created by writer-artist Jay Scott Pike, she debuted in Showcase #79 (December 1968).

== Creation and publication history ==
Dolphin was created by Jay Scott Pike; at the time the writer-artist was primarily known for his work on DC's line of romance comics. After debuting in Showcase #79 in December 1968, Dolphin was not seen for nearly a decade before appearing in a cameo in Showcase #100 (May 1978), which linked the character to Aquaman. After another hiatus, Dolphin appeared in a Rip Hunter storyline in Action Comics '552-553 and then DC Comics Presents #78 (February 1985) with a redesigned costume.

== Fictional character biography ==
Dolphin was a young girl when she fell overboard from a cruise ship, only to be saved from drowning by aliens, who abducted her to use as an experimental prototype for a subaquatic humanoid race. These experiments empowered her with various biophysical adaptations similar to ocean-themed fauna forms or mariner races.

When the aliens abandon the experiment, Dolphin escapes their underwater lab. Oblivious to her former humanity, the feral young Dolphin lives alone as a scavenger underwater. As she grows into young womanhood, Dolphin becomes tired of living an isolated, lonely life. One day, the crew of an oceanology vessel save her from an encounter with a shark and take her aboard their ship to help her.

Over time, the ship's crew try to educate and care for Dolphin, but her lack of contact with humans has left her mute. Though she grows to understand spoken language fairly quickly, she is unable to communicate until she is taught sign language. At some point, Dolphin finally masters spoken language, but never loses her shyness and reluctance to speak. She has since been a woman of few words.

Dolphin meets Aquaman during Zero Hour: Crisis in Time!, and the two later fall in love. After Aquaman's wife Mera returns from exile in the Netherworld dimension, Dolphin enters a relationship with Tempest, and the two eventually have a son named Cerdian.

When Tempest channels the magic of all Atlantis' sorcerers to undo a spell that had turned Mera into an air-breather, he is noticed by the Spectre. The Spectre obliterates Atlantis, killing Dolphin and Cerdian.

In Blackest Night, Dolphin, Tula, and Aquaman are resurrected as members of the Black Lantern Corps and are tasked with killing Tempest and Mera. Tula and Dolphin contend for Tempest's affection and mercilessly taunt him for being unable to save either of them. At the conclusion of the conflict, Tempest is killed and subsequently raised as a Black Lantern. Dolphin then battles the Titans before Dawn Granger destroys her body with a burst of light.

Dolphin returns following the DC Rebirth relaunch, where she joins Aquaman in defending seachanged Atlanteans like herself from persecution. The character is reimagined as a mutant, contemptibly referred to as a taintblood by the various tribes of Atlantis.

== Powers and abilities ==
In pre-Crisis continuity, Dolphin's anatomy was tampered with by an unknown alien race at the biomolecular level, resulting in various oceanic-adapted capabilities, such as gills, webbed fingers and toes, shining white hair, superhuman physical conditioning, resilience to deep water pressures, and a slowed aging process. She is an adept yet untrained hand-to-hand combatant who was psychologically programmed with an aptitude for high-powered artillery. The biomolecular tampering and psychological programming resulted in Dolphin being strong, fast, and abled enough to match Mera in a straightforward fistfight while underwater. During Blackest Night, she was reanimated by the Black Lantern Ring, giving her the conventional powers of a Lantern Corpsmen coupled with vast self-regenerative capabilities.

In DC Rebirth, Dolphin is a natural-born Atlantean with paranatural alterations due to being born sea-changed, a mutation caused by exposure to metaphysical energy that causes Atlanteans to gain traits from fish and other marine lifeforms. Dolphin has all the typical Atlantean augmentations that come with surviving the crushing ocean depths. She possesses minor metamorphic abilities, such as manifesting scales, webbed hands, and claws. Dolphin can generate natural light from her body, which is potent enough to induce seizures.

== Other versions ==
- An alternate universe version of Dolphin appears in JLA: The Nail as a prisoner of Cadmus Labs.
- An older version of Dolphin appears in the 1996 miniseries Kingdom Come, depicted as married to Aquaman as the new Queen of Atlantis.

== In other media ==
- Dolphin appears in Young Justice, voiced by Tiya Sircar. This version is an Indian metahuman whose powers were activated as part of the Light's "Project Rutabaga" before the Outsiders rescue her. Due to her physiology leaving her unable to survive outside of water, she is taken to Atlantis to live with Kaldur'ahm's parents, taking the name Delphis.
- Dolphin was considered to appear in Aquaman and the Lost Kingdom to replace Mera following the lawsuit between her actress Amber Heard and her former partner Johnny Depp.
- Dolphin appears as a character summon in Scribblenauts Unmasked: A DC Comics Adventure.
