= Atlantis in comics =

The fictional island of Atlantis frequently appears in popular culture, especially in comic books. The most notable examples are commonly related to Namor of Marvel Comics and a particular version of Aquaman in DC Comics.

== DC Comics ==
=== Publication history ===
One of the earliest mentions of Atlantis occurs in Action Comics #17, in a "Zatara the Magician" story. The city was visually depicted in the following month's "Zatara" story in Action Comics #18.

In Batman #19, Atlantis is shown to be inhabited by an advanced people ruled by an Emperor. The Nazis have discovered Atlantis and are using it as a naval base. Batman and Robin discover the base and are able to reveal the deception of the Nazis.

A more consistent portrayal began with an "Aquaman" story in Adventure Comics #260, in a story by writer Robert Bernstein and artist Ramona Fradon, based on the real-world mythology of Atlantis.

In DC Comics, several characters, including Aquaman and Lori Lemaris - among others - are said to have come from a sunken Atlantis. Due to a combination of magic and advanced science, they survive with the ability to breathe underwater. There are several Atlantean civilizations in the DC Universe, the most notable being Poseidonis (home to Aquaman and other humanoid water breathers) and Tritonis (home to Lemaris and other mer-people). Aquaman is from the royal family of Atlantis. Arion is another depicted lord of Atlantis. He is a fictional sword and sorcery hero published by the American company DC Comics. He debuted in Warlord #55 (March 1982), and was created by Paul Kupperberg and Jan Duursema. The history of Atlantis was detailed in The Atlantis Chronicles, a seven-issue miniseries published by DC Comics from March–September 1990. It was written by Peter David, and illustrated by Esteban Maroto. The series focused on a series of Atlantean historical manuscripts, also called The Atlantis Chronicles, and chronicled the rise and fall of Atlantis. Each issue dealt with a separate era or event in Atlantis' past, beginning with its sinking, as told through a royal historian's point of view.

In The Sandman: Brief Lives by writer Neil Gaiman, a chapter called "The People Who Remember Atlantis" speaks of "echo-Atlantises" and (many) other equatable prehistoric civilizations, and explores the theme of the bulk of human history and knowledge being lost to the modern world.

=== Zodiac artifacts ===
==== Zodiac Crystals ====
The Atlantean Royal Seal is one of 12 powerful mystical artifacts known as the Zodiac Crystals. The 12 crystals were created by Calcuha and Majistra, the parents of Lord Arion of Atlantis. The 12 artifacts are able to tap into the magical energy of the Earth to perform sorcerous feats and geomancy. The 12 crystals resurfaced in Aquaman (vol. 2) #1, where they were in the possession of Orm Marius, the Ocean Master.

==== Zodiac Coins ====
There were also 12 Atlantean Zodiac Coins, which Doctor Zodiac and Madame Zodiac used to power their Zodiac Idol; the coins were last seen in World's Finest Comics #288 (February 1983).

=== Atlantean colonies ===
There have been other undersea cities called Atlantis in various DC comics titles. They include:

- Sub Diego, first depicted in Aquaman (vol. 6) #16 (April 2004) and home of Mayor Cal Durham and Lorena Marquez. It consists of a portion of San Diego that was submerged in an attempt to convert humans into sub-aquatic beings. The population consists of a mix of these altered humans and Atlantean refugees.
- The city of Tritonis, home of King Iqula, Queen S'ona, Lenora Lemaris, Lori Lemaris, and Ronno the Mer-Man (formerly Mer-Boy).
- The coral outcropping known as Mercy Reef, where Aquaman was abandoned at birth.
- The twin cities of Shayeris and Crastinus in the Hidden Valley, home of the Idyllists and birthplace of Aqualad.
- The city of Hy-Brasil, home of the Hy-Brazilians, their entire city is a floating war machine.
- The Atlantean outpost city of Venturia, domain of Queen Clea, a foe of Wonder Woman.
- The city of Aurania, enemies of the city of Venturia and Queen Clea.
- The city of Tlapallan, populated by a sub-species of Aztec-styled onyx-skinned Atlanteans.
- The region of Maarzon is populated by tribes of green-skinned barbarians.
- The city of Thierna Na Oge, first depicted in Aquaman (vol. 2) #1 (February 1986), is home to the Tuatha De Danann, a society with a great affinity for magic, and ruled by Queen Nuada Silverhand (named after Nuada Airgetlám).
- The city of Nyarl-Amen, home of a race of fish-headed men who wield electric spears. Ruled by the sorcerer king Nyarl-Amen, the Nyarl-Amen dynasty ruled the world 50,000 years ago.
- The city of Bitterland, home to a race of Seal Men, humanoid pinnipeds who live beneath the South Pole.
- The Sargasso Sea, home to a race of frog-like Neanderthals called "Troglodytes", who live beneath the North Atlantic Subtropical Gyre. The Troglodytes have nuclear weapons, which may have been salvaged from sunken submarines.
- The city of Merezonia, the aquatic home of Queen Klitra and the Mermazons, enemies of the Red Torpedo.
- The city of Sareme is a secret undersea domed city of air-breathing albinos; it was discovered by the Flash.
- The Deep Canyons beneath New York Harbor, home of the Kogats, an ape-like species with telepathic abilities.
- References to other undersea cities named Atlantis were in Challengers of the Unknown and The Sea Devils, such as the homes of the Dolphin and the Man-Fish (Juan Vallambrosa).
- The homes of Neptune Perkins, Tsunami, Deep Blue, Little Mermaid of the Global Guardians, Barracuda of the Crusaders, Piscator of Onslaught, and Siren have all been referred to as Atlantis. Some of these cities existed in pre-Crisis continuity, and it is unclear if they are part of the current continuity.

=== Other versions ===
- On Earth-9 (Tangent Comics), the city of New Atlantis was founded atop the ruins of Atlanta, Georgia, after the Florida peninsula was destroyed in that world's version of the Cuban Missile Crisis.
- On Earth-50 (the WildStorm universe), Atlantis was founded by two alien races known as the Kherubim and the D'rahn, both races were allied against their mutual enemies the Daemonites. After discovering the true horrific nature of the D'rahn, the Kherubim turned on them and sank the city.

== Marvel Comics ==
Atlantis is a fictional location appearing in American comic books published by Marvel Comics. It is based on the mythical island of Atlantis first mentioned in Plato's initial dialogue the Timaeus, written c. 360 B.C. In the Marvel Universe, Atlantis was a small continent (about the same size as modern Australia) with many human settlements. Over 21,000 years ago, an event called the "Great Cataclysm" caused it to be submerged into the sea.

The inhabitants of ancient Atlantis built an enormous glass-like dome over the capital city, also known as Atlantis. When barbarians sent by the Deviant Lemurian empire attacked Atlantis, King Kamuu opened the magma-pits which were the city's means of heating. This caused the continent to sink. Kamuu was warned of the Great Cataclysm by the seer, Zhered-Na. When she refused to recant, he had her exiled to the mainland, where she was later stabbed to death by survivors of the submersion.

The priests and intellectuals of the city Netheria foresaw the Lemurian attack and fortified their city, and thus it sank intact. Netheria still exists today, ruled by Queen Kala. Other ancient Atlanteans survived the sinking of the continent by various methods, including Dakimh the Enchanter, Varnae, and Stygyro.

About 8,000 years ago, a group of Homo mermanus nomads discovered the ruins of the city of Atlantis. They made the ruins of the human settlements in Atlantis their home and went on to develop a society there, using material salvaged from the wreckage. These people are thus often referred to as "Atlanteans", as it is in the city of Atlantis that their first complex society emerged.

Five hundred years after the settlement of Atlantis, another group of Homo mermanus left Atlantis to find their own city; this time in a part of the ruins of Lemuria, another continent submerged during the Great Cataclysm. These "Lemurians", as they now call themselves, discovered the Serpent Crown in the ruins of their city. The Serpent Crown had been crafted by ancient Atlantean alchemists as a vessel empowered by the demonic Elder God Set. Through their leader Naga's exposure and extensive use of the ancient mystical device, they became more serpent-like in appearance than their Atlantean cousins.

Atlanteans have had little or no contact with their human cousins for millennia. However, the two races came into sustained contact, often hostile, beginning in the 20th century. On occasions, Atlanteans have invaded the surface world. The current Prince, Namor the Sub-Mariner, was initially hostile to the surface world, but fought in alliance with the Allied Powers against the Axis powers during World War II. Namor defends Atlantis against villains like Attuma and the warlord Krang, who plot to overthrow him and take over Atlantis.

The city of Atlantis was damaged when the supervillain Nitro exploded, taking with him Namor's traitorous son, Kamar.

Following Namor's attack on Wakanda during Avengers vs. X-Men, the two nations engaged in a violent conflict. After much bloodshed, Namor reached out to the Black Panther and extended a peace offering to Queen Shuri. Despite this, Wakanda launched an all-out strike on Atlantis, destroying the city and killing a number of Namor's soldiers in the process.

=== Other versions ===
- In Tales of Suspense #43, Iron Man meets a separate tribe of Atlanteans whose city sank to the bottom of the sea and has been renamed the Netherworld. He soon discovers that their Queen, Kala, is planning to invade the surface with advanced technology. Iron Man stops her by bringing her to the surface, where it is revealed that Netherworlders age rapidly when above ground. Though she is restored to her desired age when she returns to the Netherworld, Kala's hopes of ruling the surface world are greatly diminished, though she later attempts to do so several more times, all without success.
  - In a "Tuk the Caveboy" story sequence from Captain America #2 and 3 (1941), Tuk and Tanir (a Cro-Magnon man) meet Eve, princess of the not-yet lost kingdom of Atlantis, whom they aid in reclaiming the throne from her wicked uncle.
- The Exiles visited other realities that had their own version of Atlantis. On Earth-1016, the Exiles came across a reality where the forces of Atlantis were exterminating mankind. They teamed up with that reality's Doctor Doom to fend off the Atlanteans. Counter-Earth has its version of Atlantis. Proteus rose Atlantis to the surface and trapped the Atleanteans inside as a way to suffocate them.
- In the Marvel Noir reality, Atlantis matched the descriptions of Plato with it being near the Pillars of Heracles, being highly advanced, and powered by Orichalcum. As the Orichalcum proved to be too powerful to be the Atlantean's superconductor, it created a vortex that sunk Atlantis beneath the ocean.
- The ruins of the Ultimate Marvel version of Atlantis are discovered by the Fantastic Four during an expedition. Unlike its Earth-616 counterpart, this version of Atlantis is shown to have been devoid of any life for thousands of years. Upon being found by the Four, Namor suggests that the continent had been destroyed by Lemuria at some point during his time in stasis. During the Ultimatum storyline, it is revealed that the ruins of Atlantis contain a small pocket of survivors led by Namora.

== Disney comics ==
- In the Donald Duck comic "The Lost Suburb", Donald decides to get Daisy Duck a necklace. Instead of going to Atlantis, Donald finds himself stranded in a suburb of Atlantis.
- In the Uncle Scrooge comic "The Secret of Atlantis", in an attempt to outwit his nephew Donald, Scrooge acquires most of the world's circulating 1916 quarters and dumps them into the Atlantic. When circumstances necessitate his retrieving one, it is found that the quarters inadvertently ended up in Atlantis, now inhabited by fish-men who evolved from the original human Atlanteans.
- In Topolino e l'Atlantide continente perduto (Mickey Mouse and Atlantis the lost continent, 1987), Italians Giorgio Pezzin (story) and Massimo de Vita (artwork) send Mickey and Goofy back in time to witness Atlantis's last moments.

== Other comics ==
- In Marvel Family #10, Atlantis appears. It was sunk about 8000 B.C. by an earth fault below the island, but the Sivana Family hope to use an element there for a machine to prevent the Marvels from calling their lightning down. A scientist, Chal-Patzun, hoped to have Atlantis raised in the future by his descendants, his son having gone to the mainland. He had discovered an element called Protium, which in 10,000 years would become Neutrium, and in another 10,000 years, Electrium. A machine powered by this would raise the island. Before Atlantis sinks, Georgia Sivana, having traveled to the past, steals a vial of Protium. During the 20th century his descendant, Dr. Charles Patterson, is shot by Sivana while in the vault after he tries to stop him from taking Neutrium. It is raised around A.D. 12,000 by Dr. Charles Patterson's own descendant, Chass Passon, though two of the vials had been stolen by the Sivanas in the past and present, leaving just eight. Sivana Jr. succeeds in taking a vial of Electrium just after the island is raised. Atlantis is apparently located around the Atlantic coast latitude 35.
- Atlantis (along with its nemesis, Mu) plays a major part in the Italian comic book Martin Mystere.
- In The Kingdom Beyond the Waves, written by Stephen Hunt, an expedition sets out to find the ancient city of Camlantis. Once inhabited by the most advanced society in history, the city is believed to be adrift and derelict in the highest pockets of the sky. Much like Atlantis, Camlantis is a utopian society whose people perished overnight due to a great cataclysm, but Camlantis resides in the air, as opposed to the watery grave of Atlantis.
- In the now-defunct CrossGen Comics, Atlantis was the basis for the fictional universe known as the Sigilverse.
- In the webcomic Wigu, the Tinkle family as well as the head of the Illuminati are of Atlantean heritage. The second black and white comic book is to be called The Case of Atlantis.
- Dark Horse Comics produced a four-issue comic book miniseries based on the story of Atlantis called Indiana Jones and the Fate of Atlantis, as well as a corresponding LucasArts classic PC game.
- In Asterix and Obelix All at Sea, Asterix, Obelix and Getafix go to the remains of Atlantis (said to be the present-day Canaries) to seek the secret of age reversal as Obelix was accidentally reverted to childhood. At Atlantis, except for the high priest, everyone is in a state of childhood.
- In the backstory of the Hellboy comics, Atlantis is an outpost of Hyperboria, which soon collapses after Hyperboria does.
- Edgar P. Jacobs wrote his own Atlantis Mystery in 1955–1956. There, Atlantis and a rival civilization have survived until our days in giant caves beneath the Azores, but a new series of (part man-made) cataclysms strikes again.
- In the Canadian comic strip Captain Newfoundland (also known as Captain Atlantis) and related publications, the modern-day Canadian province of Newfoundland and Labrador is the tip of Atlantis, and the only part of the island that did not sink. The title character is an alien who founded Atlantis in the distant past upon discovering Earth, with Atlantis serving as a home for all collected knowledge. Captain Newfoundland has since served as a protector of Earth, granting powers to new superheroes like Captain Canada to watch over their own countries.
- Atlantis plays a role and is a location (both as the original island and a space-relocated counterpart in the present time) in several adventures of the Scrameustache character by Franco-Belgian author Gos, notably in Le Cristal des Atlantes or L'Épreuve du sablier.
