= Siren (DC Comics) =

DC Comics character

- The Hila version of Siren as depicted in Brightest Day #10 (August 2010). Art by Ivan Reis.

Publication information
- Publisher: DC Comics
- First appearance: (Hila); Aquaman #22 (August 1965); As Siren; Brightest Day #5 (July 2010) (La Sirène la Bailene); The Titans #5 (July 1999)
- Created by: (Hila); Nick Cardy (penciler, inker) (La Sirène la Bailene); Devin Grayson (writer); Mark Buckingham (artist)

In-story information
- Alter ego: Hila; La Sirène la Bailene
- Species: (Hila): Amphibious alien (Pre-Crisis); Xebellian (Atlantean) (current); (La Sirène la Bailene): Lwa
- Place of origin: (Hila): Dimension Aqua (Pre Crisis); Xebel (current)
- Team affiliations: (Hila) Xebellian Royal Family, Xebel Death Squad, Thule, Shifters (La Sirène la Bailene) Tartarus, Secret Society of Villains
- Partnerships: (Hila) Black Manta (La Sirène la Bailene) Vandal Savage
- Abilities: (Hila): Xebellian physiology grants; Superhuman strength, speed, stamina, durability, and senses; Water-breathing; Hydrokinesis; Skilled combatant, assassin, and swordswoman; Magical powers that allow for illusion casting and shapeshifting

Siren is the name of two supervillains, appearing in American comic books published by DC Comics. The first character to use the name is Hila, the identical twin sister of Mera. Originating from the same underwater sub-realm as her sister, Hila was the younger twin and considered the black sheep of the family. She eventually makes herself an enemy of both Mera and Aquaman. The second Siren was a minor Lwa resembling a mermaid. An eco-terrorist, the second Siren joined forces with Vandal Savage and becomes an enemy of the Teen Titans.

== Publication history ==
Hila is the second princess of Dimension Aqua and the first Siren made her debut in Aquaman vol. 1 #22, and is the identical twin sister of Mera and a sister-in-law to Aquaman.

The second Siren is a lwa who made her first appearance in Teen Titans #5 (July 1999), and was created by Devin Grayson and Mark Buckingham.

== Fictional character biography ==
=== Hila ===
==== Pre-Crisis ====
Hila is the identical twin sister of Mera and a sister-in-law to Aquaman. A born trouble-maker, Hila was the black sheep of the family. Given her reputation, she was easily framed for a crime and sentenced to exile with her lover Kandor. A few years later, they were on Earth. Kandor was on a quest to locate the Golden Eels and acquire their powers. He had taken to using mind-control to keep the bored Hila by his side. He had her set up a trap for Aquaman, intending to interrogate him for the location of the Eels. Hila received some affection from Aquaman before Mera caught them in the act. Then she lured him to a confrontation with Kandor. Actually Hila had planned for the two men to knock each other out, leaving her free.

Hila arrived in Atlantis and impersonated Mera, but acts of public adoration for the Queen by the Atlanteans, including a birthday celebration, got her feeling guilty. She tearfully admitted the truth and returned to rescue Arthur. Kandor had gained the upper hand in the battle and was ready to literally crush his opponent, when Hila rescued her brother-in-law and confronted her lover. The two fought using their hard-water powers. Meanwhile, Professor Xeron/Kreon contacted Mera and restored her lost powers. The second sister joined the fray, but the general confusion allowed Kandor to place one of the sisters under his mind-control again. Aquaman was then in a new predicament. The two identical sisters were fighting over his fate, one trying to kill him and the other to save him. The mind-controlled one lost the fight.

Kandor was worried his Hila was hurt, only to learn he had made the same mistake Arthur did: he was unable to tell them apart. Mera was the sister first mind-controlled and then defeated. Hila was the defender of Aquaman and the victor. The four of them then had to join forces against the Armadillo Men; created by Kandor to be his private army, the genetic constructs had rebelled. The two sisters and their respective consorts were able to defeat them. A tired but healthy Kandor released Mera and expressed his love for her. Then the four were joined by Aqualad. He had used the contact with Dimension Aqua to ask some questions. Hila and Kandor's innocence of their original crime had been proven some time ago. Their names were clear and their sentence had been canceled. The other members of their race were simply unable to locate them and recall them. The duo returned home but their subsequent activities are unknown.

==== Post-Crisis ====
Hila, now calling herself Siren, attacks Mera and Aquaman. As Mera pulls her husband away from Hila, she reveals that Siren was sent to kill him, proceeding then to confess her real origins to him. Mera also states that, despite her original mission being a solo one, Siren is now backed by the entire Death Squad, elite Xebel soldiers at the orders of the acting princess, and that she is her sister Hila. Siren is next seen approaching Black Manta at Aquaman's father's demolished tombstone. The Death Squad begin fighting Black Manta but before the fight can get too far along, Siren stops them. She tells Black Manta that they need to work together to find his son, as she makes a hard water image of Jackson Hyde. Siren, with the help of Black Manta, tracks down Jackson, but Aquaman pulls Jackson and his foster father to safety from Black Manta and Siren.

After Jackson learns the truth behind his origin, Aquaman and Jackson (now calling himself Aqualad) are ambushed by Siren and the Xebel soldiers. The fight continues onto the beach where innocent citizens get caught in the crossfire. She lies to Aquaman by telling him that her Death Squad had captured Mera while she was searching for help and that she had killed her sister herself. As Aquaman was about to strike back at Siren, Black Manta sprung from the water and severed Aquaman's right hand.Mera and Aquagirl arrive and aid Aquaman in the battle; Mera tells Aquaman that her sister lied about her condition for unknown reasons. Mera and Jackson are able to work together to seal Black Manta, Siren, and the rest of the invaders away in the Bermuda Triangle; Siren cried out to her sister Mera of her Xebel betrayal.

==== The New 52 ====
A rebooted version of Siren appears in The New 52; while still the sister of Mera, most of her origin remains unknown. At some point in time, she came across sorcerers from a dark, alternate version of Atlantis from a parallel reality known as "Thule". Through their magics, she was granted powers that included hydrokinetic powers boasted to rival Mera's own and illusion casting, allowing her to shape-shift and change her appearance.

She captures Mera and impersonates her before turning Atlantis against Aquaman, using her influence as Mera to make others believe he is prophesied to cause another cataclysmic event, which is truly caused by Thule's attempt to merge itself into the natural reality, and has him exiled from Atlantis. Secretly ruling on behalf the sorcerer-kings of Thule, she sends mercenaries and Atlantean special forces, Drift, to kill Aquaman. Eventually, Mera is freed from captivity after overcoming enchantments meant to keep her imprisoned and fights Hila, exposing her to Drift forces as an impostor and easily overpowers her with her hydrokinetic abilities.

=== La Sirène la Bailene ===
The second Siren first appeared as a mermaid ecoterrorist, as she had begun a campaign that should prevent humans from going near the water. She sang her song while walking through the town of Four Heroes, Maine. Tempest, Argent and Damage of the Titans investigated the case and Tempest soon met Siren. He held her responsible for the people's fear of water because she "stands out" and has recently been swimming. Siren tries to escape, but is frozen by Tempest. She escapes by first making Damage free her from the ice and then making Argent and Damage afraid of the water so that Tempest will have to save them. Tempest later finds her in the shallows and manages to capture her by knocking her out. She's freed from her imprisonment by Vandal Savage, whom she repays by joining the criminal team he had formed named Tartarus.

As a member of Tartarus, Siren was degraded to a sidekick of Vandal Savage and had little significance on the story she appeared in. She was a henchman in Savage's plan to attack the H.I.V.E., led by Adeline Kane, Deathstroke's wife, on a floating island above Zandia. Siren was seen trying to sing various heroes and members of H.I.V.E. into submission, but was first stopped by Jesse Quick, and then later escaped with Savage. She is a follower of the Vodou religion.

Siren was briefly seen during the attack on Zandia by Young Justice. In issue #50, Siren is the first obstacle Young Justice must get by to actually land in Zandia. She tries to stop Lagoon Boy from crushing the coast of Zandia with a tidal wave by trying to hypnotize him and promising to make him "from a boy to a man". She is stopped by Jayna, one of the Wonder Twins. Her ultimate fate remains unknown.

During the Infinite Crisis storyline, Siren became a member of Alexander Luthor Jr.'s Secret Society of Super Villains.

== Powers and abilities ==
=== Hila ===
The post-Crisis version of Hila possess powers identical to that of Mera; her Xebellian physiology grants her physical abilities like other Atlanteans, including superhuman strength, speed, durability that enables her to withstand the intense pressure of the deep ocean, water breathing, and enhanced senses that allows her possess acute hearing and vision. In addition to her physical abilities, she possess the main power of hydrokinesis like those of her race; they have the ability to psionically increase the density of volumes of water and shape them to create hard-water constructs. She can use them to cause blunt force damage or simply drown opponents. She has low-level telepathic powers, allowing her to communicate with others. She can not perceive the thoughts of individuals who are not broadcasting to her. She is also a skilled assassin, combatant, and a capable leader among her people.

The New 52 version of Hila possess some of the same powers, making her seemingly identical to her previous continuity version. Her Xebellian physiology still grants her superhuman physical abilities, including superhuman strength, speed, durability enabling her to survive intense pressures of the ocean, enhanced senses, and the ability to breathe underwater. Unlike her previous versions, her powers are supplemented through magical means. She is depicted as lacking the psionic-backed hydrokinetic powers naturally bestowed to royalty in Xebel. She has, instead, been granted it through magic. Her hydrokinetic powers allows her to create hard-water constructs, manipulate blood, and was augmented to rival Mera's hydrokinetic abilities. She is also an entity known as a "shifter", Atlanteans whom learned the ability to shape-shift through illusions. Hila also proved to be a skilled actor, deceiver, Despite her intents through magical means, however, her hydrokinetic powers were considered inferior to her sister's.

=== La Sirène la Bailene ===
The second Siren is a mermaid and able to change her tail into a pair of legs, enabling her to walk on land. In addition to that, Siren is able to stand on her tail for an unknown period of time. It appears she is able to survive outside of the water for longer periods of time. She has a light green skin tone and completely black eyes. Siren is from the Bight of Benin which makes her vulnerable to cold temperatures. Like the sirens of myth, Siren uses her voice as her main weapon. She sings hypnotic songs, forcing people to follow her every command. This also works on Tempest who is an Atlantean. During her appearance in Young Justice, she seems to have perfected that skill so that she does not need to sing to hypnotize someone. Siren is shown, in Aquaman, to have super-human strength, giving her the ability to break into a plane.

== Other versions ==
An alternate timeline variant of Hila / Siren appears in the Flashpoint tie-in Emperor Aquaman. This version is an ally of Aquaman in his war against the Amazons who seeks revenge for Mera's death before she is killed by Amazon royal Penthesileia.

== In other media ==
=== Television ===
- An original incarnation of Siren named Lorelei Circe appears in Batman (1966), portrayed by Joan Collins. This version is a world-famous singer with a hypnotic singing voice.
- An original, unnamed incarnation of Siren appears in Aquaman, portrayed by Adrianne Palicki. This version killed Atlanna and can assume a human form with the alias of "Nadia".
- The Batman (1966) incarnation of Siren makes a non-speaking cameo appearance in the Batman: The Brave and the Bold episode "Day of the Dark Knight!" as an inmate of Iron Heights Penitentiary.

=== Film ===
- The Batman (1966) incarnation of Siren makes a non-speaking cameo appearance in Batman: Return of the Caped Crusaders.
- An original, unnamed incarnation of Siren appears in DC Super Hero Girls: Legends of Atlantis, voiced by Erica Lindbeck. This version is a power-hungry sea witch who sought to steal the Trident of Atlantis and use it to conquer the world. After acquiring the necessary artifacts needed for fulfilling her ambitions, Siren attempts to sink Super Hero High and Metropolis, only to be defeated by Mera, the Super Hero Girls, and Aquaman. Following this, Siren is returned to Xebel's custody.

=== Miscellaneous ===
The Batman (1966) incarnation of Siren appears in Batman '66 #2.
