= List of Batman family enemies =

A gathering of Batman's primary enemies on a variant cover of The Joker: 80th Anniversary 100-Page Super Spectacular #1 (April 2020). From left to right: Two-Face, Man-Bat, Catwoman, Scarecrow, Joker, Ra's al Ghul, Riddler and Poison Ivy. Art by Jim Lee.

The Batman family enemies are a collection of supervillains appearing in American comic books published by DC Comics. These characters are depicted as adversaries of the superhero Batman and his allies.

Since Batman first appeared in Detective Comics #27 (May 1939), his supporting cast has expanded to include other superheroes, and has become what is now called the "Bat-family". As with most superheroes, a cast of recurring enemies to the Batman family have been introduced throughout the years, collectively referred to as Batman's "rogues gallery". Many characters from Batman's rogues gallery who are criminally insane become patients at Arkham Asylum or Blackgate Penitentiary after they are apprehended.

== Supervillains and themed criminals ==
The following fictional characters are listed in alphabetical order by the name of their supervillain persona. Each character's first appearance and brief biographies of each fictional character are also listed, staying to their fictional histories and characteristics in the DC Universe. Sometimes more than one fictional character will share a supervillain persona. In those cases, the name of the character most associated with said supervillain identity will have their name in bold in their biography.

=== Classic rogues gallery ===
Listed below are the Batman family's most enduring and iconic enemies.

Villain	Creators	First appearance	Fictional biography
Anarky	Alan Grant (writer); Norm Breyfogle (artist)	Detective Comics #608 (November 1989)	**Anarky** is introduced as Lonnie Machin, a child prodigy with knowledge of radical philosophy and driven to overthrow governments to improve social conditions. Stories revolving around Anarky often focus on political and philosophical themes. The character, who is named after the philosophy of anarchism, primarily espouses anti-statism and attacks capitalism; however, multiple social issues have been addressed through the character, including environmentalism, antimilitarism, economic inequality, and political corruption. Inspired by multiple sources, early stories featuring the character often included homages to political and philosophical texts, and referenced anarchist philosophers and theorists. The inspiration for the creation of the character and its early development was based in Grant's personal interest in anti-authoritarian philosophy and politics.[1] However, when Grant himself transitioned to the philosophy of Neo-Tech developed by Frank R. Wallace, he shifted the focus of Anarky from a vehicle for social anarchism and then libertarian socialism, with an emphasis on wealth redistribution and critique of Capitalism, to themes of individualism and personal reflections on the nature of consciousness. Expert strategist, tactician, and manipulator Proficient engineer and inventor Weapon/tool improvisation Highly skilled martial artist Trained computer scientist and hacker Originally intended to only be used in the debut story in which he appeared, Grant decided to continue using Anarky as a sporadically recurring character throughout the early 1990s, following positive reception by readers and Dennis O'Neil. The character experienced a brief surge in media exposure during the late 1990s when Breyfogle convinced Grant to produce a limited series based on the character. The 1997 spin-off series, Anarky, was received with positive reviews and sales, and later declared by Grant to be among his "career highlights". Batman: Anarky, a trade paperback collection of stories featuring the character, soon followed. This popular acclaim culminated, however, in a financially and critically unsuccessful ongoing solo series. The 1999 Anarky series, for which even Grant has expressed his distaste, was quickly canceled after eight issues. Following the cancellation of the Anarky series, and Grant's departure from DC Comics, Anarky experienced a prolonged period of absence from DC publications, despite professional and fan interest in his return. This period of obscurity lasted approximately nine years, with three brief interruptions for minor cameo appearances in 2000, 2001, and 2005. In 2008, Anarky reappeared in an issue of Robin authored by Fabian Nicieza, with the intention of ending this period of obscurity. The storyline drastically altered the character's presentation, prompting a series of responses by Nicieza to concerned readers. Anarky became a recurring character in issues of Red Robin, authored by Nicieza, until the series was cancelled in 2011 in the aftermath of "The New 52". A new Anarky was introduced into the New 52 continuity in October 2013, in an issue of Green Lantern Corps, which itself was a tie-in to the "Batman: Zero Year" storyline. Yet more characters have been authored as using the Anarky alias in the New 52 continuity via the pages of Detective Comics and Earth 2: Society. From 2013, Anarky began to be featured more heavily in media adaptations of DC Comics properties, across multiple platforms. In July, a revamped version of Anarky was debuted as the primary antagonist in Beware the Batman, a Batman animated series produced by Warner Bros. Animation. In October, the character made his video game debut in Batman: Arkham Origins, as a villain who threatens government and corporate institutions with destruction. Anarky made his live action debut in the Arrowverse television series Arrow in the fourth and fifth seasons, portrayed by Alexander Calvert, once again as a villain.
Bane	Chuck Dixon; Doug Moench; Graham Nolan	Batman: Vengeance of Bane #1 (January 1993)	The international masked criminal known as **Bane** has immense strength derived from a super-steroid called Venom. Bane's raw power, coupled with his genius level intellect and extreme strength, makes him a considerable threat to Batman, having once succeeded in breaking Batman's back.
Black Mask	Doug Moench; Tom Mandrake	Batman #386 (August 1985)	**Roman Sionis** is a corrupt businessman and crime lord who has a fixation with masks. He wears a black skull-like mask that gives him limited mind control abilities.
Catwoman	Bob Kane; Bill Finger	Batman #1 (Spring 1940)	**Selina Kyle** is an accomplished jewel thief. Although traditionally considered a villain, she is often portrayed as an antihero and is occasionally romantically involved with Batman.
Clayface	Bill Finger; Bob Kane	Detective Comics #40 (June 1940)	Actor **Basil Karlo** went mad when he learned that there would be a remake of one of his films with another actor in the lead role. Adopting the alias of the film's villain, "Clayface", he attacked several of the remake's cast and crew at the points in filming when they were supposed to die before being stopped by Batman and Robin. Later, he gained shapeshifting powers and became the **Ultimate Clayface**.
Firefly (named after the insect with the same name)	France Herron; Dick Sprang	Detective Comics #184 (June 1952)	**Garfield Lynns** is an orphan who became a pyromaniac, having developed a fireproof suit with a flamethrower to further pursue his "hobby". He invents numerous weapons that involve light to commit crimes with.
Harley Quinn	Paul Dini; Bruce Timm	Batman: The Animated Series episode "Joker's Favor" (September 1992)	**Dr. Harleen Quinzel** was the Joker's psychiatrist at Arkham Asylum until she fell in love with him and subsequently reinvented herself as his madcap sidekick, Harley Quinn. She is often mistreated by the Joker, but that rarely changes how she feels about him.
Hugo Strange	Bob Kane; Bill Finger	Detective Comics #36 (February 1940)	**Hugo Strange** is an insane psychologist who uses his mastery of chemistry to create a serum that turns his victims into mindless monsters who obey his every command. He has succeeded in deducing that Batman is Bruce Wayne.
Hush	Jeph Loeb; Jim Lee	Batman #609 (January 2003)	**Dr. Thomas Elliot** is a brilliant surgeon who targets both Bruce Wayne, his childhood friend, and Batman.
Joker	Bob Kane; Bill Finger; Jerry Robinson	Batman #1 (spring 1940)	**The Joker** (real name unknown) is a homicidal maniac with a clown-like appearance, bent on creating havoc in Gotham City and fighting a never-ending battle against Batman. His arsenal of weapons includes razor-sharp edged playing cards, acid-squirting trick flowers, joy buzzers with a lethal electrical charge and a fatal toxin called Joker venom. He is Batman's archenemy, as well as the most famous and recurring Batman villain.
Killer Croc	Gerry Conway; Don Newton; Gene Colan	Batman #357 (March 1983)	**Waylon Jones** has a medical condition that warped his body into a massive crocodile-like form. As Killer Croc descended into madness, he sharpened his teeth to razor points and began murdering innocent victims. He possesses super-strength and is immune to toxins.
Mad Hatter	Bob Kane; Bill Finger	Batman #49 (October 1948)	**Jervis Tetch** is inspired by Alice's Adventures in Wonderland to commit crimes. He uses his mind control technology to bend people to his will.
Man-Bat	Frank Robbins; Neal Adams	Detective Comics #400 (June 1970)	**Dr. Kirk Langstrom** invented a serum to give him echolocation in an attempt to cure his deafness. The serum had an unforeseen side effect, transforming him into the monstrous human-bat hybrid creature known as the Man-Bat.
Mr. Freeze (originally known as Mr. Zero)	Bob Kane; Sheldon Moldoff; David Wood	Batman #121 (February 1959)	**Dr. Victor Fries** is a scientist who accidentally spilled cryogenic chemicals on himself while inventing a freeze-gun. Now requiring subzero temperatures to survive, he uses a special containment suit and cold-themed weaponry to commit crimes. The character was later reinvented as a tragic villain, specifically a brilliant cryogenicist whose beloved wife Nora fell terminally ill. He obsessively searched for a way to cure her, until an industrial accident caused by a greedy business executive turned him into a mutant.
Penguin (named after the flightless South Pole dwelling well-swimming bird with the same name ``)	Bob Kane; Bill Finger	Detective Comics #58 (December 1941)	**Oswald Chesterfield Cobblepot** is a devious, short-statured, penguin-themed crime boss who is seldom seen without at least one of his trick umbrellas. The Penguin uses his nightclub, the Iceberg Lounge, as a front for his criminal activities. He is one of Batman's few adversaries who is sane and in full control of his actions. Riddler is one of his partnerships.
Poison Ivy	Robert Kanigher; Sheldon Moldoff	Batman #181 (June 1966)	**Pamela Lillian Isley**, a former student of advanced botanical biochemistry, employs plants of all varieties and their derivatives in her crimes. She has the ability to control all plant life and can create new henchmen with her mutated seeds. She is very attractive, very beautiful, extremely toxic and poisonous and she's very seductive especially to and with men . She also has Aloe for blood, chlorophyll for skin, lips so full of venom that every time she kisses somebody they die and she is immune to all plant-based poisons.
Ra's al Ghul	Dennis O'Neil; Neal Adams	Batman #232 (June 1971)	**Ra's al Ghul** ("the Demon's Head" in Arabic) is a centuries-old international radical environmentalist who believes that his actions help "bring balance" to the world. Ra's al Ghul is the founder of the League of Assassins and is fully aware of Batman's secret identity. Impressed by Batman's skills and intellect, he wants the Dark Knight to take his place as his heir.
Riddler	Bill Finger; Dick Sprang	Detective Comics #140 (October 1948)	**Edward Nashton**, a.k.a. **Edward Nygma** (or **"E. Nygma"**), is a criminal mastermind who has a compulsion to challenge Batman by leaving clues to his crimes in the form of riddles, puzzles, and word games. Nygma's intelligence rivals that of Batman. Nygma often carries a question mark-tipped cane around with him, as well as many other trick puzzle gimmicks. Penguin is one of his partnerships.
Scarecrow	Bob Kane; Bill Finger	World's Finest Comics #3 (September 1941)	**Professor Jonathan Crane** was an outcast in childhood due to constant bullying, until he grew up to face his fears as a psychologist and biochemist specializing in fear. Kicked out of a university for his unorthodox teaching methods, he now dresses symbolically as a scarecrow and employs a toxin that causes its victims to hallucinate seeing what they fear the most.
Talia al Ghul	Dennis O'Neil; Bob Brown; Dick Giordano	Detective Comics #411 (May 1971)	**Talia al Ghul** is a daughter of Ra's al Ghul, the granddaughter of the Sensei, the sister of Dusan al Ghul, the mother of Damian Wayne and a high-ranking member of both the League of Assassins and Leviathan. She has been known to have several on again-off again romantic relationships with Batman.
Two-Face	Bob Kane; Bill Finger	Detective Comics #66 (August 1942)	**Harvey Dent** was a Gotham City district attorney until half of his face was disfigured by acid after being assaulted by mob boss Sal Maroni. Having developed dissociative identity disorder, Dent is obsessed with the number two and the concept of duality and must make most of his decisions with the flip of his signature two-headed coin. As Two-Face, Dent commits crimes themed around the number two and the concept of duality.
Ventriloquist / Scarface	Alan Grant; John Wagner; Norm Breyfogle	Detective Comics #583 (February 1988)	**Arnold Wesker** is a small, mild-mannered ventriloquist with dissociative identity disorder. He projects a criminal personality through his gangster-themed dummy, Scarface.

=== Other recurring enemies ===
Villain	Creator(s)	First appearance	Fictional biography
Lonnie Machin / Anarky	Alan Grant; Norm Breyfogle	Detective Comics #608 (November 1989)	**Lonnie Machin**, sometimes called **Moneyspider**, is a teenage prodigy who creates improvised gadgets to subvert governments. His violent methods and political philosophy set him at odds with Batman and Robin.
General	Chuck Dixon; Michael Netzer	Detective Comics #654 (Note: Ulysses Armstrong was introduced as a supervillain called "the General". Designation changed to "Anarky" in Robin (vol. 4) #181 (February 2009).) (December 1992)	**Ulysses Hadrian Armstrong**, formerly known as the General, is a young, psychotic military genius who became the second Anarky after kidnapping Lonnie Machin. Unlike Machin, who had used the Anarky identity to cause social change, Armstrong used the persona to cause psychotic and meaningless acts of chaos and destruction. This Anarky is primarily an enemy of Tim Drake.
Anarky	Van Jensen; Robert Venditti	Green Lantern Corps (vol. 3) #25 (November 2013)	A new Anarky surfaced during Zero Year, appearing during a blackout in Gotham City. This Anarky is an African American teenager who was shown rallying a group of followers and evacuees to occupy a sports stadium, on the basis that the area the stadium was built upon was gentrified at the expense of the local community and should be returned to them. The true name and identity of this character remains a mystery, making him the only Anarky so far to remain anonymous.
Anarky	Francis Manapul; Brian Buccellato	Detective Comics (vol. 2) #37 (February 2015)	**Sam Young** is a corrupt politician who became the most recent Anarky to exact revenge on the Mad Hatter. Young's sister was the Mad Hatter's first murder victim, or his first "Alice", as the Mad Hatter affectionately calls his female victims.
Black Mask	Alan Grant; Norm Breyfogle	Batman: Shadow of the Bat #1 (Note: Not originally a supervillain: Jeremiah Arkham did not become the second Black Mask until his appearance in Batman: Battle for the Cowl #1 (May 2009).) (June 1992)	**Jeremiah Arkham** became the new Black Mask following the death of Roman Sionis. Arkham, the director of Arkham Asylum, began to develop multiple personality disorder, leading to him assuming the identity of Black Mask.
Barbatos	Peter Milligan	Batman #452 (August 1990)	The mysterious Bat-Devil that haunted Gotham across time, fought Vandal Savage in the Stone Age and corrupted or possessed a man that would become Simon Hurt. Later revealed to be the Hyper-Adapter, a sentient weapon from Apokolips, unleashed by Darkseid to travel across time and torment Batman.
Barbatos	Scott Snyder; Greg Capullo	Dark Days: The Casting #1 (September 2017)	An ancient God-Monster from the Dark Multiverse, worshipped by Hath-Set, the Bat Tribe, the Tribe of Judas, the Court of Owls, Simon Hurt, the Black Glove and the Dark Knights. He had first noticed Bruce Wayne when he slipped through time and now has finally arrived in the DC Universe.
Brother Eye	Jack Kirby	OMAC #1 (October 1974)	An evil artificial intelligence created by Bruce Wayne and Michael Holt originally as a metahuman database and deterrent, now hellbent on conquering the world.
Calculator	Bob Rozakis; Mike Grell	Detective Comics #463 (September 1976)	**Noah Kuttler** is a highly intelligent criminal who fights Batman and the Justice League wearing a costume designed like a pocket calculator. In spite of his powerful arsenal, the Calculator never makes it big as a costumed villain. Now relying solely on his intellect, he works as a successful information broker and source of information for supervillains planning heists. He sees the Oracle as his nemesis and opposite number.
Calendar Man	Bill Finger; Sheldon Moldoff	Detective Comics #259 (September 1958)	**Julian Gregory Day** is known for committing crimes that correspond with holidays and significant dates. He sometimes wears costumes to correlate with the date of the designated crime. His best-known latter day incarnation is in the miniseries Batman: The Long Halloween, where he is portrayed as a Hannibal Lecter-like figure, offering insight in Batman's search for Holiday, a vigilante who uses holidays as his modus operandi.
Catman	Bill Finger; Jim Mooney	Detective Comics #311 (January 1963)	**Thomas Blake** was a world-famous trapper of jungle cats who turned to crime because he had grown bored with hunting and squandered most of his fortune. He became a burglar who committed his crimes in a cat-suit made out of an ancient African cloth he believes gives him a "cat's nine lives".
Clayface	Bill Finger; Sheldon Moldoff	Detective Comics #298 (December 1961)	Treasure-hunter **Matthew "Matt" Hagen** is transformed into the monstrous Clayface by a pool of radioactive protoplasm. He now possesses super-strength and can change his claylike body into any form.
Clayface	Len Wein; Marshall Rogers	Detective Comics #478 (July 1978)	**Preston Payne** suffered from hyperpituitarism, so he worked at S.T.A.R. Labs to search for a cure. He obtained a sample of Matt Hagen's blood, isolating an enzyme which he introduced into his own bloodstream. However, his flesh began to melt, so he built an anti-melting exoskeleton to not only preserve himself, but to also prevent him from touching anyone, as he also gained the ability to melt people into protoplasm with a touch. This was until he learned that he needed to spread his melting contagion onto others to survive. He later met and fell in love with Lady Clay, and the two had a son named Cassius "Clay" Payne.
Clayface / Lady Clay	Mike W. Barr; Jim Aparo	Outsiders #21 (July 1987)	**Lady Clay (Sondra Fuller)** has superpowers similar to that of the second Clayface, Matt Hagen. She meets and falls in love with the third Clayface, Preston Payne, and gives birth to Cassius "Clay" Payne.
Clayface / Claything	Doug Moench; Kelley Jones	Batman: Shadow of the Bat #27 (January 1998)	**Cassius "Clay" Payne**, otherwise known as the Claything, is the son of Preston Payne and Lady Clay who inherited the abilities of his parents. Payne was separated from his parents and was experimented on by the government. Unlike his parents, Payne can only keep his metahuman abilities while awake and, if a piece of his clay body is separated from him, it can grow a mind of its own.
Clock King	Sean McKeever; Eddy Barrows	Teen Titans (vol. 3) #56 (Note: The second Clock King (Temple Fugate) was originally introduced in the Batman: The Animated Series episode, "The Clock King", which first aired on September 21, 1992. Teen Titans #56 (May 2008) was the character's first comic book appearance.) (May 2008)	While the Clock King (**William Tockman**) was an enemy of the Green Arrow, the **Temple Fugate** version of the character leads the Terror Titans, which antagonizes Robin and the Teen Titans.
Cluemaster	Gardner Fox; Carmine Infantino	Detective Comics #351 (May 1966)	**Arthur Brown** was a game show host until he turned to a life of crime. He is the father of Stephanie Brown.
Copperhead	Bob Haney; Bob Brown	The Brave and the Bold #78 (June 1968)	The original Copperhead, **"John Doe"** (real name unknown), was a criminal who committed numerous thefts in Gotham City wearing a snake costume before finally being apprehended by Batman and Batgirl. He eventually becomes a hired assassin and would sell his soul to the demon-lord Neron in exchange for more power, being transformed into a deadly human/snake hybrid.
Copperhead	Sean McKeever; Eddy Barrows	Teen Titans (vol. 3) #56 (April 2008)	A second Copperhead, **Nathan Prince**, was introduced as a member of the Terror Titans.
Deadshot	Bob Kane; David Vern Reed; Lew Schwartz	Batman #59 (June 1950)	**Floyd Lawton** is an excellent sniper assassin who, when wielding a gun or projectile, never misses a shot.
Doctor Death	Gardner Fox; Bob Kane	Detective Comics #29 (July 1939)	**Dr. Karl Hellfern** is a nefarious scientist who threatens Gotham with deadly biochemical weapons. He is notable for being Batman's first recurring villain.
Simon Hurt	Sheldon Moldoff; Charles Paris	Batman #156 (June 1963)	A Wayne from the second generation of the family who lived in the 18th century and worshipped the Bat-Devil Barbatos, but instead confronted the Hyper-Adapter. Corrupted or possessed by the Hyper-Adapter's energies, Wayne became extremely long-lived; renamed as Doctor Simon Hurt, he became the leader of a secret cult known as the Black Glove and the Club of Villains. He also set out to kill his descendant, Bruce Wayne.
Electrocutioner	Marv Wolfman; Michael Fleisher; Irv Novick	Batman #331 (January 1981)	The original Electrocutioner is a vigilante (last name **Buchinsky**, first name unknown) who murders criminals with electricity. He is eventually killed by Adrian Chase.
Electrocutioner	Marv Wolfman; Jim Aparo	Detective Comics #626 (February 1991)	The second Electrocutioner's identity remains unknown. He is a vigilante like his predecessor.
Electrocutioner	Chuck Dixon; Tom Lyle; Scott Hanna	Detective Comics #644 (May 1992)	**Lester Buchinsky** is the brother of the original Electrocutioner. He started off as a vigilante like his brother, but soon became a mercenary.
Great White Shark	Dan Slott; Ryan Sook	Arkham Asylum: Living Hell #1 (July 2003)	Former crooked investor **Warren White** thought he scored a legal victory when he won the insanity plea in court. However, White learned that he had made a mistake as he found himself among Batman's most dangerous enemies within Arkham Asylum. After much torture and abuse, a disfigured Warren White was driven insane. Now one of Batman's enemies himself, White serves as a benefactor for other villains.
Duela Dent	Bob Rozakis	Batman Family #6 (August 1976)	**Duela Dent** is a psychotic young woman who has an obsession with the Joker. To try and impress the Joker, she began a series of crimes before deciding to track down the Dollmaker, who is a mad surgeon and one of the Joker's allies. When Duela found Dollmaker, she convinced him to inject her veins with the Joker's blood, which he had been keeping in jars. She then proclaimed herself to be the Joker's "daughter", continuing her career as a supervillain.
Failsafe	Chip Zdarsky; Jorge Jiménez	Batman Vol. 3 #145	The artificial Batman of Zur-En-Arrh construct of Batman created the android Failsafe from the technology of Amazo and other technological Justice League villains as Batman's failsafe should he start killing. At one point, Failsafe made an aging clone of Bruce Wayne to serve as his Robin when Damian Wayne rejected him.
KGBeast	Jim Starlin; Jim Aparo	Batman #417 (March 1988)	**Anatoli Knyazev** is an ex-KGB assassin. He is among the villains who are executed by the second Tally Man.
Killer Moth	Bill Finger; Dick Sprang; Lew Schwartz	Batman #63 (February 1951)	**Drury Walker**, a.k.a. **Cameron Van Cleer**, is a moth-themed criminal, known for being the first villain defeated by Batgirl. In three stories in 1951,he set himself up asBatman's "evil twin" and discovered Batman's secret identity---only to develop amnesia whenshot in the head by an underworld rival.He has spent all his time since trying to regain his former memories.
King Scimitar	Dennis McNicholas	Batman: The Audio Adventures Special #1 (December 2021)	**King Scimitar** is a Gotham City arms dealer focusing on exotic swords. He made himself an enemy of the League of Assassins.
Kite Man	Bill Finger; Dick Sprang	Batman #133 (August 1960)	**Charles "Chuck" Brown** commits crimes by arming himself with kite-based weapons and hang-gliding on a large kite.
Maxie Zeus	Dennis O'Neil; Don Newton	Detective Comics #483 (May 1979)	**Maximillian Zeus** is a former history teacher who loses his mind and believes himself to be the Greek god Zeus, committing crimes modeled after Greek mythology. Completely delusional, yet quite dangerous, he usually uses electricity-based weaponry to emulate the lightning bolts of Zeus, and at one point formed the New Olympians consisting of characters based on Greek mythological characters. Though briefly cured of his delusional state, he reverted to his Maxie Zeus persona when the Joker murdered his nephew.
Onomatopoeia	Kevin Smith; Phil Hester	Green Arrow #12 (March 2002)	Onomatopoeia is a serial killer who targets non-powered vigilante superheroes. He earned his name because he imitates noises around him, such as dripping taps, gunshots, etc. No personal characteristics are known about Onomatopoeia, including his real name or facial features. Onomatopoeia is a superb athlete, martial artist, and weapons expert. He carries two semi-automatic handguns, a sniper rifle, and an army knife.
Owlman	Gardner Fox; Mike Sekowsky	Justice League of America #29 (August 1964)	**Thomas Wayne Jr.** is an exceptionally intelligent supervillain who is the Earth-Three counterpart of Bruce Wayne. He is a member of the criminal organization known as the Crime Syndicate of America, the Earth-Three equivalent of the Justice League. His Prime Earth counterpart is one of the leaders of the Court of Owls, under the name of Lincoln March.
Prometheus	Grant Morrison; Arnie Jorgensen	New Year's Evil: Prometheus #1 (February 1998)	While the original Prometheus, Curtis Calhoun, was an enemy of the Blue Beetle, the most notable villain to use the name is a twisted mirror image of Batman, real name unknown. As a child, he watched in horror as police slaughtered his parents in a Bonnie and Clyde-style shoot-out. He swore revenge upon "justice" as a result of this incident.
Rag Doll	Gardner Fox; Lou Ferstadt	Flash Comics #36 (December 1942)	**Peter Merkel** is a master contortionist and hypnotist who has fought Batman on many occasions. Since The New 52, he has been an inmate at Arkham Asylum.
Rag Doll	Gail Simone; Dale Eaglesham	Villains United #1 (July 2005)	**Peter Merkel Jr.** is the son of the original Rag Doll, who was born with normal limbs, but underwent painful major surgery to become a contortionist supervillain like his father.
Ratcatcher	Alan Grant; John Wagner; Norm Breyfogle	Detective Comics #585 (April 1988)	**Otis Flannegan** is a one-time ratcatcher who turns to a life of crime. He has the ability to communicate with and train rats, and uses them to plague Gotham City. Shortly after the Infinite Crisis began, the Ratcatcher was killed by an OMAC agent in hiding, who identified the Ratcatcher as a gamma level threat and vaporized him.
Enigma / The Riddler's Daughter	Geoff Johns; Tony Daniel; Carlos Ferreira; Art Thibert	Teen Titans (vol. 3) #38 (September 2006)	"**Enigma**" is the heroic and criminal partner of Duela Dent, the Joker's Daughter.
The Batman Who Laughs	Scott Snyder; Greg Capullo	Dark Days: The Casting #1 (September 2017)	A version of Bruce Wayne from Earth-22 who was driven insane by Joker venom and murdered the Joker and the rest of the Batman family. Currently serves as the leader of the Dark Knights and a lieutenant to Barbatos.
Tweedledum and Tweedledee	Don Cameron; Jerry Robinson; Bob Kane	Detective Comics #74 (April 1943)	**Dumfree and Deever Tweed** are cousins whose similar looks often have them mistaken for identical twins. The pair wear costumes modeled on their namesakes from Lewis Carroll's Through the Looking-Glass and are members of the Mad Hatter's Wonderland Gang.
Vandal Savage	Alfred Bester; Martin Nodell	Green Lantern #10 (winter 1943)	A Cro-Magnon warrior who was exposed to a meteorite that gave him immortality and who has influenced history, having been a Pharaoh in Egypt and a participant in the murder of Julius Caesar. Savage is an enemy of the Justice League, the Justice Society, the Immortal Man, the Resurrection Man, Hawkman, Alan Scott, Jay Garrick, Pandora, Superman and Batman, with occasional special interest in the Wayne family.
Ventriloquist / Scarface	Paul Dini; Don Kramer	Detective Comics #827 (March 2007)	**Peyton Riley**, called "Sugar" by Scarface, became the second Ventriloquist after the death of Arnold Wesker.
Victor Zsasz	Alan Grant; Norm Breyfogle	Batman: Shadow of the Bat #1 (June 1992)	**Victor Zsasz**, a.k.a. **Mister Zsasz**, is a serial killer whose modus operandi involves slitting the throats of his victims, then arranging the bodies in lifelike poses. He cuts a tally mark onto his own body for each of his victims.
White Rabbit	David Finch; Paul Jenkins	Batman: The Dark Knight #1 (September, 2011)	The daughter of Tom Hudson, **Jaina Hudson** dated Bruce Wayne after she moved from India to Gotham City. Until, during the breakout at Arkham Asylum, Jaina adopted her supervillain persona, White Rabbit, and gave both Batman and Gotham City Police Department a run for their money.

==== Nightwing's villains and enemies ====
Villain	Creator(s)	First appearance	Description
Blockbuster	Roger Stern, Tom Lyle	Starman #9 (April 1989)	The second Blockbuster, **Rolland Desmond**, is the most prominent crime boss in Bludhaven who retains high intelligence due to combination of a less abrasive serum and a demonic pact with Neron. He also possess superhuman strength and often appears as a hulking individual.
Brutale	Chuck Dixon, Scott McDaniel	Nightwing (vol. 2) #22 (July 1998)	A former police interrogator from South America, **Guillermo Barrera** is a mercenary often employed by crime boss, Rolland Desmond, to battle Nighwing.
Double Dare	Chuck Dixon, Scott McDaniel	Nightwing (vol. 2) #32 (June 1999)	Sisters **Margot** and **Aliki Marceau** are successful aerialist and performers of Cirque Sensationnel who double as thieves.
Lady Vic	Chuck Dixon, Scott McDaniel	Nightwing (vol. 2) #14 (January 1997)	Hailing from a family line of British mercenaries, Lady **Elaine Marsh-Morton** carries versatile weaponry from her family's historical plunders and is a hired killer to maintain her family estate. Unlike most of his adversaries, Nightwing considered Lady Vic formidable threat in personal combat.
Shrike	Chuck Dixon, Scott McDaniel	Nightwing Secret Files and Origins #1 (October 1999)	Shrike is the name of several villains affiliated with the League of Assassins: The name was first held by a trainer who trained children into assassins until his operations were foiled by Grayson during his first year as Robin and circumstances led to his death. The second Shrike (**Boone**) was a former student who took his mentor's name sometime afterwards and harbors a strong enmity for Grayson due to a perceived betrayal of a friendship and subsequent death of his mentor.
Stallion	Chuck Dixon, Scott McDaniel	Nightwing (vol. 2) #14 (November 1997)	Former wide receiver for the Dallas Cowboys **Randy Hanrahan** lost a promising sports career due to an injury. Later working as a bouncer for the Iceberg Lounge, he eventually became a freelance assassin known for his steroid-enhanced physique to kill his targets despite his lack of formal training. The character was reintroduced a similar history, revealed a homosexual, and a member of the Run-Offs, making him an eventual ally of Nightwing.
Torque	Chuck Dixon, Scott McDaniel	Nightwing (vol. 2) #1 (October 1996)	**Dudley "Deadly" Soames** was a corrupt Blüdhaven police inspector and secret informant, and lieutenant for Blockbuster. When Soames became a liability, Desmond attempted to kill him by snapping his neck. Miraculously surviving, albeit malformed by his head being backwards, he was rehabilitated from radical drug therapy and beginning a new criminal career as Torque, using special glasses to see forward and favors a tommy gun.
Giz and Mouse	Chuck Dixon, Jim Balent	Catwoman (vol. 2) #28(January 1996)	Experts in computer crime, Giz (**Brandon Li**) and Mouse (**Pamela Sweigeld**), Catwoman's former protege, are a romantic partners and thieves whom once worked with Blockbuster. Both character's histories are changed after DC Rebirth, also being supporting characters as part of Bludhaven's Run-Offs, a support group for former villains. Brandon is later killed while helping Nightwing investigate the Second Hand, a shell-crime group for Spyral.
Giz and Mouse	Chuck Dixon, Mike Parobeck	Robin (vol. 2) #18 (July 1995)	Experts in computer crime, Giz (**Brandon Li**) and Mouse (**Pamela Sweigeld**), Catwoman's former protege, are a romantic partners and thieves whom once worked with Blockbuster. Both character's histories are changed after DC Rebirth, also being supporting characters as part of Bludhaven's Run-Offs, a support group for former villains. Brandon is later killed while helping Nightwing investigate the Second Hand, a shell-crime group for Spyral.
Saiko	Kyle Higgins, Eddy Barrows	Nightwing (vol. 3) #1 (May 2012)	A former childhood best friend, **Raymound McCreary** served as Grayson's replacement for the Court of Owls's selection as an assassin. Not meeting their standards, he was discarded, blamed Grayson for it, and sought revenge.
Talon	Scott Snyder, Greg Capullo	Batman (vol. 2) #2 (December 2011)	Grayson's great-grandfather long-lived through electrum. **William Cobb** originated from poverty. Later employed as a knife-thrower in the circus, he was selected as a Talon with ambitions to rise above the aristocracy in Gotham. He creates the "Grayson" legacy with intents to begin an assassin legacy and frequently schemes to coerce his great-grandson into following his direction.
Parliament of Owls	Scott Snyder; Greg Capullo	Batman (vol. 2) #3 (December 2011)	A global off-shoot of the Court of Owls working to expand their influence globally. Due to his relation to William Cobb, the Parliament is equally persistent in recruiting Dick Grayson as a Talon due to his skills and status, resorting to manipulation, coercion, and brainwashing.
Agent Zero	Edmond Hamilton, Sheldon Moldoff	Detective Comics #233 (July 1956)	The original Batwoman, **Kathy Kane**, her birthname is revealed to be **Katrina Luka Netz**, one of the two daughters of former Nazi scientent and original Agent Zero, Otto Netz (Doctor Dedalus). Taking a keen interest in Grayson, she manipulates events to keep him an agent of Spyral.

=== The League of Assassins ===
First appearing in Strange Adventures #215, the League of Assassins is a team of highly trained killers that was founded by Ra's al Ghul and has often swayed from working under his organization to working independently of it. The group has been led at times by Dr. Ebenezer Darrk, the Sensei, Lady Shiva, and Cassandra Cain. (Note: Cassandra Cain is traditionally an ally to Batman rather than an adversary, hence why the character does not appear on this list.) (Note: Cassandra Cain was under the influence of Deathstroke during her leadership of the League of Assassins.)

Villain	Creator(s)	First appearance	Fictional biography
Alpha	Kelley Puckett; Damion Scott	Batgirl (vol. 2) #35 (November 2003)	**Michael Sommers** is a dangerous assassin and a terrorist-for-hire. Sommers joined the League of Assassins under Lady Shiva.
Anya Volkova	James Tynion IV; Scott Snyder; Guillem March	Talon #3 (February 2013)	**Anya Volkova** is a former member of the League of Assassins who has allied herself with Casey Washington in a fight against organizations like the League and the Court of Owls.
Bronze Tiger	Dennis O'Neil; Jim Berry; Leo Duranona	Richard Dragon, Kung Fu Fighter #1 (April–May 1975)	**Ben Turner** comes from an upper middle class black neighborhood in Central City. When he was only 10 years old, he saw a burglar attacking his parents, and he proceeded to kill the man with a kitchen knife. In an effort to control the rage inside him, Turner turns to the martial arts and, eventually, crime. He trained with the same martial arts masters as Batman and the Green Arrow.
Cheshire	Marv Wolfman; George Pérez	New Teen Titans Annual #2 (August 1983)	Real name **Jade Nguyen**, Batman battled Cheshire when she teamed up with the KGBeast, bringing her into conflict with the Dark Knight and Arsenal. Batman battled her in Zürich, but the fight ended when Batman had Nightwing rescue Cheshire's daughter Lian, after which she gave up peacefully, allowing Batman to arrest her.
Malcolm Merlyn the Dark Archer	Mike Friedrich; Neal Adams; Dick Dillin	Justice League of America #94 (November 1971)	**Malcolm Merlyn the Dark Archer** (**Arthur King**) is a highly skilled archer and mercenary. Although primarily an enemy of the Green Arrow, Merlyn has had several encounters with the Batman family as a member of the League of Assassins.
David Cain	Kelley Puckett; Damion Scott	Batman #567 (July 1999)	**David Cain** is the father of Cassandra Cain and an enemy to both her and Batman. David Cain helped train Bruce Wayne in the field of the martial arts.
December Graystone	James Tynion IV; Julius Gopez	Red Hood and the Outlaws #21 (August 2013)	**December Graystone** is a League of Assassins operative who can perform blood magic. He cuts himself to access various powers through spilled blood, such as telekinesis and teleportation.
Detonator	Peter Milligan; Freddie E. Williams II	Batman #670 (December 2007)	**The Detonator** is a member of the Seven Men of Death, aside from the League of Assassins.
Doctor Ebenezer Darrk	Dennis O'Neil; Neal Adams	Detective Comics #405 (November 1970)	**Ebenezer Darrk** is the first known individual assigned to head the League of Assassins by Ra's al Ghul. Although many of the League's leaders over the years have been accomplished martial artists, Darrk himself did not depend on physical prowess and, as an assassin, he instead relied upon careful planning and manipulation, ambushes, and death traps, as well as a variety of cleverly concealed weapons and poisons. After earning Ra's' enmity (for unknown reasons), Darrk died during a plot to kidnap his daughter Talia al Ghul (then using the name Talia Head).
Doctor Moon	Dennis O'Neil; Irv Novick	Batman #240 (March 1972)	**Dr. Moon** is a highly immoral scientist and neurosurgeon. His areas of expertise are body modifications, psychological conditioning, and torture. He is known for hiring his services out to many different supervillains.
Doctor Tzin-Tzin	John Broome; Sheldon Moldoff	Detective Comics #354 (August 1966)	**Dr. Tzin-Tzin** is a Fu Manchu-inspired Asian-looking (but actually American) crime lord who battles Batman several times and once encounters Jonny Double and Supergirl. Tzin-Tzin is seemingly killed on an airship during a battle with the Peacemaker.
Dragonfly	Robert Kanigher; Sheldon Moldoff	Batman #181 (June 1966)	**The Dragonfly**, alongside the Silken Spider and the Tiger Moth, attacked Wayne Manor.
White Ghost	Peter Milligan; David Lopez	Batman Annual #26 (October 2007)	**Dusan al Ghul** is the son of Ra's al Ghul, the grandson of the Sensei, the maternal uncle of Damian Wayne, and the brother of Talia al Ghul, who was rejected by his father because Dusan was born an albino. He tried everything to earn his father's respect, but eventually gave up and left. Dusan returns later as **the White Ghost** to use his nephew's Damian Wayne body for his father to use as a vessel.
Expediter	Christopher Yost; Frazer Irving	Azrael: Death's Dark Knight #3 (July 2009)	**Fadir Nasser** (also going under the alias the "White Ghost") is the top secret agent of the League of Assassins and a loyal servant of Ra's al Ghul. He frequently clashed with Azrael (Michael Lane), Batman and Robin and, on one occasion, the Gotham City Sirens.
Grind	Mike W. Barr; Trevor von Eeden	Batman Annual #8 (January 1982)	**Grind** used to be Ra's al Ghul's bodyguard, until he was replaced by Ubu. He possessed the same temperament as his predecessor. Grind was seemingly killed in the subsequent explosion of Ra's' mountain fortress.
Hook	Jack Miller; Neal Adams	Strange Adventures #210 (March 1968)	**The Hook** is a retired gangster mostly known for having shot and killed Boston Brand, turning Brand into Deadman.
Kirigi	James Owsley; Jim Aparo	Batman #431 (March 1989)	**Kirigi** is a top martial artist and a League of Assassins trainer. Kirigi taught Bruce Wayne and various members of the League of Assassins the art of ninjitsu.
Kitty Kumbata	Chuck Dixon; Scott McDaniel	Richard Dragon #1 (July 2004)	**Kitty Kumbata** is a talented but mentally unstable martial artist. She has been a member of the League of Assassins and Lady Shiva's Circle of Six.
Kyle Abbot	Greg Rucka; Shawn Martinbrough	Detective Comics #743 (April 2000)	Formerly an agent of Ra's al Ghul and Intergang, **Kyle Abbot** is the bodyguard of Whisper A'Daire, empowered by his mistress with the same serum that gave her immortality and shapeshifting abilities. In Kyle's case, the serum gave him the ability to turn into a wolf or a werewolf-like creature, making him the second-in-command of a small army of similarly empowered henchmen.
Lady Shiva	Dennis O'Neil; Ric Estrada	Richard Dragon, Kung Fu Fighter #5 (December 1975)	**Lady Shiva** is a deadly martial artist and the mother of Cassandra Cain.
Maduvu	Grant Morrison; Tony S. Daniel	Batman #671 (January 2008)	**Maduvu** is a member of the Seven Men of Death.
Mad Dog	Andersen Gabrych; Ale Garza	Batgirl (vol. 2) #67 (October 2005)	**Mad Dog** is the son of David Cain, who had begun thinking about what he would leave behind when he died. He wished for a "perfect child" — specifically a "perfect artisan of his craft". This led to the birth of Mad Dog.
Malaq	Greg Rucka; Shawn Martinbrough	Detective Comics #750 (November 2000)	**Malaq** is a member and henchman of the League of Assassins.
Nyssa Raatko	Greg Rucka; Klaus Janson	Detective Comics #783 (August 2003)	**Nyssa Raatko** is a daughter of Ra's Al Ghul.
Onyx	Joey Cavalieri; Jerome Moore	Detective Comics #546 (January 1985)	Highly trained in the martial arts, **Onyx** first aligned herself with the League of Assassins before reforming and becoming a vigilante. She resides in Gotham City and is considered an ally of the Batman. She is a member of the Outsiders and the leader of the Fist Clan.
Owens	Christopher Yost; Ramon Bachs	Red Robin #1 (August 2009)	**Owens** is a sniper who was partnered up with Pru and Z to assassinate the Red Robin. Owens was killed by the Widower of the Council of Spiders.
Professor Ojo	Dennis O'Neil; Ric Estrada	Richard Dragon, Kung Fu Fighter #16 (August 1977)	**Professor Ojo** is a brilliant criminal scientist with a vendetta against atomic energy.
Prudence Wood	Christopher Yost; Ramon Bachs	Red Robin #1 (August 2009)	**Pru** is an assassin who worked for the Demon's Head, but later defected to work with Tim Drake.
Razorburn	Grant Morrison; Tony S. Daniel	Batman #671 (January 2008)	**Razorburn** was a member of the Seven Men of Death. As part of this team, he was summoned to Gotham City by Talia al Ghul to retrieve the Suit of Sorrows from the Order of Purity.
Rictus	James Tynion IV; Julius Gopez	Red Hood and the Outlaws #21 (August 2013)	**Rictus** is a criminal who replaced his body parts with cybernetics.
Sensei	Neal Adams	Strange Adventures #215 (November–December 1968)	**Sensei** is a top martial artist, the immortal father of Ra's al Ghul, grandfather of Dusan al Ghul and Talia al Ghul, and great-grandfather of Damian Wayne.
Silver Monkey	Chuck Dixon; Steve Lieber	Detective Comics #685 (May 1995)	**Silver Monkey** is a martial artist who was trained by the Cult of the Monkey Fist. As an assassin and mercenary, he has become an enemy of Batman and the Green Arrow. He was eventually gunned down and killed by the Ventriloquist.
Silken Spider	Robert Kanigher; Sheldon Moldoff	Batman #181 (June 1966)	**The Silken Spider** is a member of the League of Assassins.
Shellcase	Grant Morrison; Tony S. Daniel	Batman #670 (December 2007)	**Shellcase** was a member of the Seven Men of Death. As part of this team, Shellcase was summoned to Gotham City to retrieve the Suit of Sorrows from the Order of Purity.
Targa	Judd Winick	Green Arrow and Black Canary #9 (August 2008)	**Targa** is a telekinetic who is the leader of the League of Assassins' metahuman faction. He thinks that he is leading a subgroup of the League of Assassins. They took orders from whom they thought was Ra's al Ghul to kidnap Connor Hawke.
Tiger Moth	Robert Kanigher; Sheldon Moldoff	Batman #181 (June 1966)	**The Tiger Moth'**s costume disorients opponents, making them incapable of hitting her.
Tigris	Andersen Gabrych; Alé Garza	Batgirl (vol. 2) #68 (November 2005)	**Tigris** (not to be confused with Tigress) is a member of the League of Assassins under Nyssa Raatko's leadership and a devout disciple of Cassandra Cain. She is recognized by her niqab.
Ubu	Dennis O'Neil; Neal Adams	Batman #232 (June 1971)	**Ubu** is the name of several people in a long line in serving as Ra's al Ghul's bodyguard.
Vial	Christopher Yost; Ramon Bachs	Red Robin #3 (October 2009)	**Vial** is a member of the League of Assassins killed by Funnel, a member of their rival organization the Council of Spiders.
Whisper A'Daire	Greg Rucka; Shawn Martinbrough	Detective Comics #743 (April 2000)	**Whisper A'Daire** is a former agent of Ra's al Ghul/partner of Kyle Abbot. While in his service, Ra's gifted her a serum that granted her immortality and the ability to transform into a cobra.

=== Morrison-era enemies (2007–2011) ===
These are enemies that were introduced under writer Grant Morrison.

Villain	Creators	First appearance	Fictional biography
Clayface of Japan	Grant Morrison; Chris Burnham	Batman Incorporated #6 (June 2011)	**The Clayface of Japan** is a samurai with abilities similar to the previous Clayfaces.
Flamingo	Grant Morrison; Frank Quitely	Batman #666 (July 2007)	Nicknamed "the eater of faces" for his cannibalistic tendencies, **Eduardo Flamingo** is a psychotic hitman who works for the Mob.
Jackanapes	Grant Morrison; Andy Kubert	Batman #666 (July 2007)	**The Jackanapes** is a gorilla in a clown costume who wields a machete and a sub-machine gun.
Max Roboto	Grant Morrison; Andy Kubert	Batman #666 (July 2007)	**Max Roberto** is a cyborg with a partially cybernetic face who operates in a futuristic timeline in which Damian Wayne is Batman.
Phosphorus Rex	Grant Morrison; Andy Kubert	Batman #666 (July 2007)	**Phosphorus Rex** is a member of the Circus of Strange whose body is constantly on fire. His metahuman abilities make him immune to the harmful effects of fire.
Professor Pyg	Grant Morrison; Andy Kubert	Batman #666 (July 2007)	Donning a pig mask, **Lazlo Valentin** is a mad scientist known for kidnapping people and brutally transforming them into minions that he calls "Dollotrons". He also sometimes experiments with transforming human beings into humanoid animals.
Weasel	Grant Morrison; Andy Kubert	Batman #666 (July 2007)	**The Weasel** is a man with all-canine teeth. He appears as an enemy of Damian Wayne in the future.
Absence	Paul Cornell; Scott McDaniel	Batman and Robin #18 (January 2011)	A former girlfriend of Bruce Wayne, **Una Nemo** received a bullet in her head and survived. Now, she is stalking and killing Bruce Wayne's former mistresses.
Big Top	Grant Morrison; Frank Quitely	Batman and Robin #2 (September 2009)	**Big Top** is a morbidly obese bearded man in a tutu. He is part of the Circus of Strange.
Doctor Dedalus	Grant Morrison; Yanick Paquette	Batman Incorporated #3 (March 2011)	**Otto Netz** is a mad scientist and the father of Kathy Kane, the original Batwoman. Years ago, Netz was defeated by the spy syndicate Spyral and imprisoned; suffering from Alzheimer's disease, he was locked away, but secretly escaped and brainwashed his jailer to take his place. Netz was recruited by Leviathan to build a doomsday device, but died at the hands of Damian Wayne to save Batman and Nightwing.
Heretic	Grant Morrison; David Finch	Batman and Robin #12 (April 2010)	The mysterious **Heretic** is a clone of Damian Wayne, artificially aged and genetically enhanced by Talia al Ghul. He is Leviathan's most fearsome soldier, having killed both Knight and his "brother" Damian.
Id	David Hine; Agustin Padilla	Batman Annual #28 (February 2011)	**The Id** is a French supervillain who could awaken hidden desires in any human being with a mere touch. Sister Crystal turned his head into glass, with his brain always visible.
Jezebel Jet	Grant Morrison; Andy Kubert	Batman #656 (October 2006)	The President of a small African nation, **Jezebel Jet** was a successful model and philanthropist who became romantically involved with Bruce Wayne. However, she was also a high-ranking member of the Black Glove and agreed to seduce Wayne in exchange for the Black Glove murdering her adopted father and installing her as president. Her attempt to drive Batman insane failed due to Batman realizing she was a spy; she was murdered by the Man-Bat Commandos sent by Talia al Ghul.
King Kraken	Grant Morrison; Tony S. Daniel	Batman #676 (June 2008)	**King Kraken** is an aquatic criminal from Sweden and a deep sea diver known to go up against Batman and Wingman.
Mister Toad	Grant Morrison; Frank Quitely	Batman and Robin #1 (August 2009)	**Mister Toad** is a mutant toad-man who is part of the Circus of Strange.
Ray Man	David Hine; Greg Tocchini; Andrei Bressan	Batman and Robin #26 (August 2011)	A French supervillain who can create visual illusions out of a hole in his head. While creating a mass illusion, **the Ray Man** pretends to be a reality-warping god-like superbeing named Paradox.
Siam	David Hine; Greg Tocchini; Andrei Bressan	Batman and Robin #26 (August 2011)	**Siam** is a name used by conjoined triplets with a specialized fighting style. They are members of the Circus of Strange.
Sister Crystal	David Hine; Greg Tocchini; Andrei Bressan	Batman and Robin #26 (August 2011)	A French supervillainess using the name **Sister Crystal** who has the ability to turn everything she touches into glass.
Skin Talker	David Hine; Greg Tocchini; Andrei Bressan	Batman and Robin #26 (August 2011)	**The Skin Talker** has a unique skin disease that make words appear on his body. He is fully in control of this ability, and the words on his skin have hidden hypnotic effects.
Son of Man	David Hine; Greg Tocchini; Andrei Bressan	Batman and Robin #26 (August 2011)	A French supervillain, and enemy of Nightrunner. As an infant, **Norman S. Rotrig** was mutilated by his insane father into becoming what his father believed was a living masterpiece of art. The Son of Man now has a permanent Glasgow smile on his face and retaliated against his father by dissecting him and keeping him alive in front a mirror, while still alive but in pieces. Determined to turn Paris, France, into a "work of art", the Son of Man is considered to be the French counterpart of the Joker.
Son of Pyg	Grant Morrison; Cameron Stewart	Batman Incorporated #4 (March 2011)	**Janosz Valentin / Johnny Valentine** is the son of the infamous Professor Pyg. Janosz wears a similar pig mask to his father, but it is heavily damaged and has red eyes. He is a masochist who claims that he can teach others to feel no pain.
Sillman	Grant Morrison Frank Quietly	Batman and Robin #10 (May 2010)	'''Silman / Silver Hurt''' is the successor to mystery villian El Penitente / Simon Hurt, he has succeeded in his goal to claim leadership of The Third Hierarchy.
Swagman	Grant Morrison; Tony Daniel	Batman #676 (June 2008)	**The Swagman** is an armored supervillain who targets members of the Batman family.
White Knight	Peter Tomasi; Patrick Gleason	Batman and Robin #21 (April 2011)	A mysterious being of light who seeks to battle the darkness of Gotham City, the **White Knight** targeted the relatives of Arkham Asylum's inmates to save their souls by dressing them as angels and forcing them to commit suicide. As a very resourceful and inventive serial killer, the White Knight's ultimate goal is to kill all of Arkham's inmates.

=== The New 52 and Beyond ===
In September 2011, The New 52 rebooted DC's continuity. Since this new timeline began, these supervillains have been introduced. These are characters that have not been around long enough to apply to any other category.

Villain	Creator(s)	First appearance	Fictional biography
Bentley	Tony Daniel	Detective Comics (vol. 2) #2 (October 2011)	A member of the Dollmaker Family, **Bentley** is a being of brute strength.
Matilda Mathis / Dollhouse	Tony Daniel	Detective Comics (vol. 2) #2 (October 2011)	Dollmaker's daughter who initially dressed as a nurse with a ceramic mask stitched into her face as Dollmaker's right-hand henchwoman. **Matilda Mathis** took up her father's cause and became Dollhouse, kidnapping children and harvesting their organs for the organ trade. She then turns what is left of their bodies into human dolls that she uses to decorate her garden.
Jack-in-the-Box	Tony Daniel	Detective Comics (vol. 2) #2 (October 2011)	**Jack-in-the-Box** is a member of the Dollmaker Family who has a mutilated, surgically enhanced body with arms seemingly made of rubber.
Mister Toxic	Tony Daniel	Detective Comics (vol. 2) #2 (October 2011)	**Mister Toxic** began as a low-level criminal known as "the Gas Man", one of several amateur supervillains that the Penguin called upon to offer them "protection" for their money. The Gas Man eventually became Mr. Toxic and found himself more than a match for Batman. After Mr. Toxic robbed several nuclear plants, Batman discovered that he was the dying clone of one of Bruce Wayne's fellow businessmen. Batman was able to defeat Mr. Toxic, who has not been seen since.
Olivia Carr	Tony Daniel	Detective Comics (vol. 2) #2 (October 2011)	**Olivia Carr** is a girl who was kidnapped and brainwashed into becoming a member of the Dollmaker Family.
Orifice	Tony Daniel	Detective Comics (vol. 2) #2 (October 2011)	**The Orifice** is a member of the Dollmaker Family who has various foreign limbs and tissue stitched to his body.
Sampson	Tony Daniel	Detective Comics (vol. 2) #2 (October 2011)	A member of the Dollmaker Family, **Sampson** is a small man made to look like a toy monkey.
Wesley Mathis	Tony Daniel	Detective Comics (vol. 2) #2 (October 2011)	**Wesley Mathis** is a serial killer and former enemy of Commissioner Gordon who would take his son Barton Mathis (who would grow up to become Dollmaker), on "hunting trips" in which he kidnapped and cannibalized human beings. He was eventually killed in a struggle with Gordon, leading to his son's personal vendetta against Gordon.
Brute	James Tynion IV; Mikel Janín	Detective Comics (vol. 2) #19 (June 2013)	**The Brute** is a prisoner of Santa Prisca who has gone through extensive new experimentations with Venom.
Malicia	James Tynion IV; Mikel Janín	Detective Comics (vol. 2) #19 (June 2013)	**Malicia** is an ally of Bane who has gone through experiments with Venom at Santa Prisca.
Professor	James Tynion IV; Mikel Janín	Detective Comics (vol. 2) #19 (June 2013)	**The Professor** is a scientist who works at Santa Prisca and specializes in experiments with Venom for Bane.
Wolf-Spider	James Tynion IV; Mikel Janín	Detective Comics (vol. 2) #19 (June 2013)	**The Wolf-Spider** is a recruit of Bane who has been enhanced with Venom.
Doctor Falsario	Tim Seeley; Scott Snyder; James Tynion IV; Ray Fawkes; John Layman; Andy Clarke	Batman Eternal #18 (October 2014)	**Doctor Falsario** is a supervillain who has hypnotic powers.
Barton Mathis / Dollmaker	Tony Daniel	Detective Comics (vol. 2) #1 (September 2011)	The leader of his "Family", **Barton Mathis** is a mad doctor who specializes in organ transplantation. He is responsible for the creation of twisted surgical abominations made of several different limbs and organs stitched into one being. He runs an organ trade business and is responsible for cutting the Joker's face off. Though the Dollmaker sees the Toyman as a father figure, he is not to be confused with the Toyman's biological son, Anton Schott, who has also used the Dollmaker alias.
Eli Strange	Tony Daniel	Detective Comics (vol. 2) #5 (March 2012)	**Eli Strange** is the criminal son of Hugo Strange. Eli Strange collaborated with Catwoman during some of his criminal activities. His real name is later revealed to be Elliot Montrose.
Emperor Penguin / Emperor Blackgate	John Layman; Jason Fabok	Detective Comics (vol. 2) #13 (December 2012)	**Ignatius Ogilvy** was the right-hand man of the Penguin, who had aspirations of taking over the Penguin's criminal empire as his operative "the Emperor Penguin". Ogilvy briefly managed to do so and empowered himself with a combination of the Man-Bat serum, one of Poison Ivy's plant concoctions, and the Venom drug, which gave him a form with blue skin as tough as bark, pointy ears, and red eyes while possessing superhuman strength, enhanced speed, and enhanced durability. He was incapacitated by Batman and Penguin and was arrested by the police. Within Blackgate Penitentiary, Ogilvy gained control of the prison's organized criminal activity by killing the unnamed prison boss and took the name "Emperor Blackgate".
Fishnet	Ann Nocenti; Rafa Sandoval	Catwoman (vol. 4) #17 (April 2013)	**Otto Baxter Kruft'**, a.k.a. Fishnet, is a henchman for the Penguin, recognizable for wearing a fishnet stocking over his face.
Volt	Ann Nocenti; Rafa Sandoval	Catwoman (vol. 4) #17 (April 2013)	**Volt** is the Penguin's resident technological genius and creator of many of his weapons. An accident gave Volt electrical powers.
Hypnotic	Tony Daniel	Detective Comics (vol. 2) #6 (April 2012)	**Hypnotic** is an upstart criminal who works under the Penguin's guidance. He uses radio waves to control his victims' minds.
Imperceptible Man	Tony Daniel	Detective Comics (vol. 2) #6 (April 2012)	**The Imperceptible Man** is a seemingly invisible criminal who came to Gotham in an alliance with the Penguin.
Jill Hampton	Tony Daniel	Detective Comics (vol. 2) #6 (April 2012)	**Jill Hampton** works for the Penguin and is Charlotte Rivers' sister.
Mister Combustible	Tony Daniel	Detective Comics (vol. 2) #6 (April 2012)	**Mr. Combustible** is an upstart criminal who works under the Penguin's guidance.
Snakeskin	Tony Daniel	Detective Comics (vol. 2) #6 (April 2012)	**Snakeskin** is a shapeshifter and Jill Hampton's boyfriend.
Grotesque	Gail Simone; Ardian Syaf; Alitha Martinez	Batgirl (vol. 4) #7 (May 2012)	**Grotesque** is a masked man identified as "snobbish" because of his very eccentric tastes.
Knightfall	Gail Simone; Alitha Martinez	Batgirl (vol. 4) #10 (August 2012)	**Charise Carnes** was a prisoner at Arkham Asylum when a massive breakout took place in which she watched the other inmates torture and kill others. After getting out of the asylum, Carnes became a vigilante called Knightfall who torments and murders criminals, eventually becoming an enemy of Batgirl.
Merrymaker	John Layman; Jason Fabok	Detective Comics (vol. 2) #17 (February 2013)	**The Merrymaker** is a supervillain who leads a gang of criminals called the League of Smiles, who are obsessed with the Joker.
Mister Bloom	Scott Snyder; Greg Capullo	Batman (vol. 2) #43 (August 2015)	Real name unknown, **Mr. Bloom** stole high-tech seeds that allowed him to manipulate his own body, seeing himself as a gardener come to prune the garden of Gotham as a failed experiment.
Mister Bygone	Scott Snyder; James Tynion IV; Ray Fawkes; Dustin Nguyen; Trevor McCarthy	Batman Eternal #6 (July 2014)	**Mr. Bygone** is a mysterious man who is a product of the insanity that infests Arkham Asylum.
Mister Mosaic	Tony Daniel	Detective Comics (vol. 2) #5 (March 2012)	**Mr. Mosaic** is a deformed rich underboss of the Penguin.
Mother	James Tynion IV; Scott Snyder; Tony Daniel	Batman and Robin Eternal #1 (October 2015)	The sole survivor of a village that was destroyed in the crossfire of a brutal war, "Mother" sees herself as making children stronger by forcing them to endure tragedy, believing that Batman shares her views in his efforts to "mold" the Robins.
Nobody	Peter Tomasi; Patrick Gleason	Batman and Robin (vol. 2) #1 (September 2011)	**Morgan Ducard** (a.k.a. "Nobody") has almost telekinetic powers seemingly based on sound waves. Ducard is the son of Henri Ducard, the detective who once trained Bruce Wayne. He seeks to destroy Batman Incorporated and believes that killing criminals could save more lives than simply putting them in prison and allowing them to live.
Punchline	James Tynion IV	Batman (vol. 3) #89 (April 2020)	**Alexis Kaye** was a college student who developed an unhealthy obsession with the Joker, eventually becoming his new sidekick and girlfriend. She is adept at wielding knives and makes use of Joker venom.
Trickster	Greg Pak; Jae Lee	Batman/Superman #1 (June 2013)	**Kaiyo** is a mischievous New God from Apokolips who can pass between worlds at will. She is responsible for the first meeting between Batman and Superman.
White Rabbit	David Finch; Paul Jenkins	Batman: The Dark Knight (vol. 2) #1 (September 2011)	**Jaina Hudson** is the mastermind behind a toxin known to obliterate all fear from one's mind. Due to her involvement with Bane and the Scarecrow, she once managed to defeat Batman.
Menace	Justin Gray; Jimmy Palmiotti; Eduardo Pansica	Batwing #25 (January 2014)	**Russell Tavaroff** is a former friend of Luke Fox who became his enemy upon getting exposed to the Venom offshoot Snakebite, which gives him enhanced strength and durability at the cost of giving him a mental illness.
Wolf Spider	Mark Andreyko; Jeremy Haun	Batwoman (vol. 2) #26 (February 2014)	**Evan Blake** is a playboy and an old friend of Kate Kane who operates as the art thief the Wolf Spider. He is not to be confused with a similarly named recruit of Bane who has a hyphen in his name.
Tusk	Peter Tomasi; Doug Mahnke; Patrick Gleason	Batman and Robin Annual Vol. 2 #2 (January 2014)	**Tusk** is a metahuman crime lord with tusks and elephant-like skin.
Haunter	Scott Bryan Wilson; Bilquis Evely	Batman Annual (vol. 3) #1 (January 2017)	Real name unknown; **the Haunter** is a malnourished woman with orange hair. She has the ability to kill anyone whose DNA she comes in contact with, causing them to dissipate into black smoke. She is hinted to be already known to Batman and to be on good terms with the rest of Batman's villains in Arkham. She escapes from Arkham and assists the Scarecrow in a plan to release fear gas in Gotham on Christmas Eve, but both are paralyzed by the gas and recaptured by Batman.
Stag	Steve Orlando; Riley Rossmo	Batman Annual (vol. 3) #1 (January 2017)	**The Stag** is a mysterious woman adorned in black and yellow, a black horned headdress, and a white mask. Not much is known about her currently. She is first seen invading the apartment of Barry O'Neill and killing him with a stab to the forehead.
Blackbird	Julie Benson; Shawna Benson; Roge Antonio	Batgirl/Birds of Prey #8 (May 2017)	**The Blackbird** is a woman with the metahuman power to drain those of others. Feeling that metahumans were oppressed, she planned to take the powers of many for herself and use them to create a revolution. She managed to lure in several students under the guise of a training school, forming an association with Roulette. Her students included Gemini and an undercover Black Canary.

=== Enemies of lesser renown ===
These enemies are categorized by their obscurity or for being less notable than other characters in this article.

Villain	Creator(s)	First appearance	Fictional biography
Abattoir	Marv Wolfman; Jim Aparo	Detective Comics #625 (January 1991)	A schizophrenic, superstitious, and cannibalistic serial killer, **Arnold Etchison** had fear of death and was under the delusion that he absorbed his victims' life force when he killed them, therefore prolonging his lifespan. Abattoir was obsessed by his own bloodline and, believing his relatives to be all evil, set out to murder members of his extended family. He wore a makeshift cape made out of a trench coat to imitate costumed beings such as Superman and Batman. Jean-Paul Valley let Abattoir fall to his death during the Batman: Knightfall storyline.
Actuary	Chuck Dixon; Graham Nolan	Detective Comics #683 (March 1995)	**The Actuary** is a mathematical genius who applies formulae to aid the Penguin in committing crimes.
Agent Orange	Mike W. Barr; Jim Aparo	Batman and the Outsiders #3 (October 1983)	Claiming to be a Vietnam War veteran, **Agent Orange** is a supervillain who blames the United States government for his injuries. He attacks the citizens of Gotham City with the help of his followers.
Amba Kadiri	David Vern Reed; Ernie Chan	Batman #274 (April 1976)	An Indian thief and leader of the Afro-Asian block of the Underworld Olympians, **Amba Kadiri** crossed paths with Batman, only to be captured so that her team may go on in the competition. She is an accomplished thief and martial artist who bears steel-clawed fingertips.
Amygdala	Alan Grant; Norm Breyfogle	Batman: Shadow of the Bat #3 (August 1992)	**Aaron Helzinger** is a powerful behemoth with a childlike temper. He is quick to anger and turns into a murdering monster after doctors experiment on his brain. He has been stopped by Batman in the past by applying a severe blow to the back of his neck.
Answer	Alan Grant; Mark Buckingham	Batman Villains Secret Files and Origins #1 (October 1998)	**Mike Patten** is an engineer in Gotham City who believed a civilization 15,000 years ago was wiped out due to a massive earthquake. During the events of Cataclysm, his wife and daughter perished, leading Mike to believe the end of humanity was nigh. He became the Answer to prove his theory to society through robbery and murder.
Architect	Scott Snyder; Kyle Higgins	Batman: Gates of Gotham #1 (July 2011)	**Zachary Gate** is the descendant of Nicholas Anders, one of the architect brothers who constructed Gotham City's bridges. Upon his stepbrother's death, Nicholas attempted to avenge him by killing Gotham's founding fathers: the Waynes, the Cobblepots and the Elliots, on whom he blamed his death. He was then jailed for the murder of Robert Kane and declared that the forefathers' descendants would suffer for their sins. Zachary comes across this knowledge and the name of the Architect from his ancestor's journals and decided to avenge him, setting his goals on eliminating the forefathers' descendants.
Atom-Master	Bill Finger; Dick Sprang	World's Finest #101 (May 1959)	A scientist whose helmet can cast illusions.
Atomic-Man	Sheldon Moldoff	Detective Comics #280 (June 1960)	**Paul Strobe** is a scientist who can shoot beams from his eyes that can transmute matter into another form and focuses them through the special lenses of his goggles.
Bad Samaritan	Mike W. Barr; Alan Davis	Outsiders #3 (January 1986)	**"The Bad Samaritan"** is a highly trained agent of the USSR who became an independent contractor in espionage, terrorism, and assassination working for virtually all major governments.
Baffler	Chuck Dixon; Tom Grummett	Robin (vol. 4) #1 (November 1993)	**Titus Samuel Czonka** is an unintelligent brute who leaves riddles for Batman to solve, similar to the Riddler and the Cluemaster.
Bag O'Bones	Gardner Fox; Sheldon Moldoff	Batman #195 (September 1967)	Radioactivity transforms **Ned Creegan** into a skeletal-looking "living X-ray photo" who calls himself Bag O'Bones and battles Batman and Robin. Creegan later returns as the Cyclotronic Man, fighting Black Lightning and Superman. Still later, he adopts the name the One Man Meltdown and battles the Outsiders. After getting the medical treatment he needs, Creegan goes back to prison, content to do his time in jail and then reform.
Batzarro	Jeph Loeb; Ed McGuinness	Superman/Batman #20 (June 2005)	**Batzarro** is a Bizarro version of Batman whose origins remain unknown.
Benedict Asp	Dennis O'Neil	Justice League Task Force #6 (November 1993)	Benedict Asp is the brother of Shondra Kinsolving, the trained physiotherapist who meets Bruce Wayne when he is dealing with exhaustion and helps to look after him after he is injured by Bane. He kidnaps her and turns her abilities to evil uses. Asp reveals Shondra's healing powers and, along with his own psychic abilities, uses her to telekinetically kill an entire village. Bruce eventually defeats Benedict, but the events traumatize Shondra.
Billy Numerous		Catwoman (vol. 3) #78 (Note: Billy Numerous was originally introduced in the Teen Titans episode, "Deception", which first aired on August 28, 2004. Catwoman (vol. 3) #78 (April 2008) was the character's first comic book appearance.) (April 2008)	Billy Numerous has the ability to make copies of himself, which he uses for criminal activity. He has taken on Slam Bradley and the Catwoman.
Birthday Boy	Geoff Johns; Gary Frank	Batman: Earth One (July 2012)	In the Earth One re-imagining of Batman's origin, **Ray Salinger** is a serial killer who operated at the beginning of Batman's career. Nicknamed "the Birthday Boy", Salinger kidnaps and murders young women who resemble his first victim. His modus operandi is to give the person that he is about to kill a birthday cake with his first victim's name on it and tells them to "make a wish".
Bizarro-Batman	Edmond Hamilton; Curt Swan	World's Finest Comics #156 (March 1966)	Not to be confused with Batzarro, Bizarro-Batman is a Bizarro version of Batman who appeared as a member of a Bizarro version of the Justice League of America. Bizarro-Batman originates from Htrae, the Bizarro World.
Black and White Bandit	Dave Gibbons	Batman: Gotham Knights #12 (February 2001)	**Roscoe Chiara** was an artist who was hired to create a portrait using experimental paint. After doing so, he completely lost the ability to see colors. Chiara then began robbing public locations of valuable materials.
Black Spider	Gerry Conway; Ernie Chan	Detective Comics #463 (September 1976)	The first Black Spider is **Eric Needham**, a hunter of the drug dealers who ruined his life.
Black Spider	Doug Moench; Kelley Jones	Batman #518 (May 1995)	The second Black Spider is **Johnny LaMonica**. He is killed by Crispus Allen during a gang shooting.
Black Spider	Gail Simone	Birds of Prey #87 (December 2005)	A third Black Spider appears named '**Derrick Coe**, who battles the Birds of Prey.
Blockbuster	Gardner Fox; Carmine Infantino	Detective Comics #345 (November 1965)	**Mark Desmond** is a former chemist who experiments on himself and subsequently becomes a mindless brute who possesses super-strength.
Blue Bat	Bill Finger; Dick Sprang	Batman #127 (October 1959)	In an alternate universe, the Blue Bat was a criminal who wore the Batman costume.
Bouncer	Gardner Fox; Carmine Infantino	Detective Comics #347 (January 1966)	**The Bouncer** is a metallurgist who discovers "an alloy of rubber, steel, and chrome" called "elastalloy", which he uses to create a suit that allows him to bounce "tremendous distances or from great heights—yet not be harmed at all!" The Bouncer fights Batman twice, once alone and once as a minion of the Monarch of Menace.
"Brains" Beldon	Bill Finger; Sheldon Moldoff	Detective Comics #301 (March 1962)	**"Brains" Beldon** is a criminal genius who pulls off a $20,000,000 heist in Gotham City before being defeated by Batman. He is the father of the Teen Titans' foe the Disruptor.
Brand	Bill Finger; Sheldon Moldoff	Batman #137 (February 1961)	**The Brand** is a cowboy-themed supervillain who uses cattle brands as weapons and as clues for future crimes.
Bruno	Frank Miller; Klaus Janson; Lynn Varley	The Dark Knight Returns (February–June 1986)	In the Dark Knight Universe, **Bruno** is a neo-Nazi who is a chief henchwoman of the Joker and has ties to the Mutant Gang.
"Buzz" Galvan	Chuck Dixon; Tom Lyle	Detective Comics #644 (May 1992)	**Elmo "Buzz" Galvan** has the ability to control electricity. He requires an electrical generator to provide him with power. He can then use the electricity to fire powerful blasts, generate force fields and electro-statically crawl up walls. Galvan was a robber who, along with three others, stole 2 million pounds and in the process murdered four people. The gang were about to make their getaway to a Caribbean island when they were captured by Batman. Galvan's gang blamed him for the murders and he took the fall and was sentenced to die in the electric chair. On his execution date, Galvan was enraged to see the witnesses, who he perceived had come to laugh at his death. The execution was unsuccessful, damaging his nervous system and leaving him partially paralyzed. The laws of the state decreed that he could not be executed again. Unwilling to be confined to a charity ward for the rest of his life, Galvan crawled from his bed and bit into a power line in an attempt to kill himself. The electricity restored his ability to move and gave him control over electricity. Galvan set out to avenge himself against those he believed had mocked him.
Calamity	Brenden Fletcher; Becky Cloonan; Karl Kerschl; Gerry Duggan; Shawn Crystal	Gotham Academy #1 (October 1, 2014)	The latest in the long line of Calamity aliases, **Sybil Silverlock / Calamity** slowly lost control of herself due to possession by the vengeful ghost of her ancestor, Amity Arkham. Sybil woke up after a blackout to discover she had murdered her own husband and her grip on her own mind kept worsening until she was defeated by Batman and Robin after setting an entire residential block alight in the Narrows. Following the collapse of Arkham Asylum, Sybil became a patient in a coma held in Arkham Manor. When Dr. Eric Border exposed his true identity as the Joker in the asylum and infected a portion of Clayface with Joker venom, unleashing the new monster Clownface, Silverlock was awakened from her coma and escaped from the asylum in the confusion.
Captain Stingaree	Bob Rozakis; Michael Uslan; Ernie Chan	Detective Comics #460 (June 1976)	**Karl Courtney** is a criminal who commits crimes using a pirate motif.
Cavalier	Don Cameron; Bob Kane	Detective Comics #81 (November 1943)	**Mortimer Drake** is an expert swordsman who speaks in Shakespearean English and dresses in a French musketeer costume. Initially depicted as craving adventure and riches, the rogue was repeatedly bested by Batman and Robin. The Cavalier eventually lost his mind, and can sometimes be seen as an inmate or escapee from Arkham Asylum.
Cavalier	James Robinson; Tim Sale	Batman: Legends of the Dark Knight #32 (June 1992)	The second Cavalier is **Hudson Pyle**, a sword-wielding vigilante.
Charlatan	Bill Finger; Lew Sayre Schwartz	Batman #68 (1951)	**Paul Sloan** was a successful actor who was persuaded to impersonate Two-Face by a number of Gotham's villains when Two-Face refused to join their scheme after Two-Face's coin landed with the unscarred side up. Paul ends up encountering Batman briefly in the process. He is later tortured and disfigured by Two-Face and experimented upon by the Scarecrow. Paul returned years later, attacking the various villains who had recruited him, all in an attempt to get to Batman. He is currently incarcerated at Arkham Asylum.
Chancer	Alan Grant; Tim Sale	Batman: Shadow of the Bat #7 (December 1992)	**The Chancer** is a bank robber, real name unknown, who is armed with simply a baton.
Clayface / The Claything	Doug Moench; Kelley Jones	Batman: Shadow of the Bat #27 (January 1998)	**Dr. Peter Malley**, also known as the second Claything, was a DEO scientist who was transformed when he merged with a sample of Cassius Payne. Malley has the ability to melt objects simply by looking at them.
Clayface	Ed Brubaker; Darwyn Cooke	Catwoman (vol. 3) #1 (January 2002)	**Todd Russell** is a serial killer with the ability to transform into virtually any shape and size who targets prostitutes.
Clayface	A. J. Lieberman; Javier Pina	Batman: Gotham Knights #60 (February 2005)	**Johnny Williams** is a former firefighter who gained a claylike appearance and the ability to shapeshift following an explosion at a chemical plant. He was manipulated by Hush and the Riddler to transform his appearance into that of Jason Todd to deceive Batman, which failed.
Clock	Win Mortimer	Star Spangled Comics #70 (July 1947)	In Pre-Crisis continuity, the second person to use the identity of the Clock is a clock-themed criminal who is primarily an enemy of Robin. Not to be confused with Clock King.
Clownface	Gerry Duggan; Shawn Crystal	Arkham Manor #2 (November 26, 2014)	"**Clownface**" originally began as a stray piece of Clayface's body that became unattached and gained enough sentience to morph itself into a mute old man. This man was found and taken to Arkham Manor because of his unresponsiveness. Bruce Wayne, who was undercover as Jack Shaw in the manor, was able to recognize the man as a portion of Clayface, but avoided blowing his own cover to alert the guards. The Joker, undercover also, as the Arkham attendant Eric Border, shed his disguise and secretly infected this Clayface fragment with Joker venom, morphing it into an entirely separate killing machine he called Clownface. Clownface wreaked havoc in the manor, killing multiple people, before being subdued by Batman and Mr. Freeze. Frozen solid thanks to Freeze's help, Clownface was stored in the manor's freezer until he was to be collected by the guards.
Colonel Blimp	Paul Kupperberg; Don Newton	Batman #352 (October 1982)	Real name unknown, **Colonel Blimp** is a man in a purple and gold uniform similar to that of a German zeppelin pilot. He has twice stolen a submarine, using a blimp he flies armed with magnetic tentacles. He holds the submarine for ransom, announcing to the city that he will not return the submarine until a certain amount of money is paid. The second time, he is stopped by Gotham Girl.
Colonel Sulphur	Dennis O'Neil; Irv Novick	Batman #241 (May 1972)	**Colonel Sulphur** is a self-styled warrior with a vast knowledge of psychological terror who fights Batman four times in the 1970s and 1980s. Sulphur also encounters Superman and Supergirl and puts together an Army of Crime.
Composite Superman	Edmond Hamilton; Curt Swan	World's Finest Comics #142 (June 1964)	An out-of-work scuba diver, **Joseph Meach** gained the combined powers of the Legion of Super-Heroes after being struck by the energy discharge of their statues while he slept. He then desired to defeat Superman and Batman. Later the effect and his memory faded, but his powers were restored by an alien whose father had been imprisoned by Batman and Robin. Meach sacrificed himself to save the superheroes.
Condiment King	Chuck Dixon; Scott Beatty	Batgirl: Year One #8 (September 2003)	**Mitchell Mayo** is a villain who makes use of various condiments, sometimes capable of causing anaphylactic shock. He is a comedy relief villain who is easily defeated by Robin and Batgirl.
Cornelius Stirk	Alan Grant; Norm Breyfogle	Detective Comics #592 (November 1998)	**Cornelius Stirk** is an Arkham Asylum inmate who possesses latent psychic abilities; specifically, the ability to induce hallucinations and fear in others. A delusional psychotic, Stirk believes that he will die unless he regularly eats human hearts.
Corrosive Man	Alan Grant; John Wagner; Norm Breyfogle	Detective Comics #587 (June 1988)	A convicted murderer, **Derek Mitchell** escapes from jail seeking vengeance on Mortimer Kadaver, but is involved in an unfortunate accident on the way that turns him into a literally corrosive man, his skin burning with chemical fire which can eat through walls and floors or burn human flesh. His encounter with Kadaver leaves the latter with a handprint burned onto his forehead and leaves Mitchell inert, although he surfaces at least twice more.
Crazy Quilt	Jack Kirby	Boy Commandos #15 (May–June 1946)	**Paul Dekker** is an ex-painter who leads a double life as a master thief and is blinded by a gunshot wound during a botched robbery. While in prison, he volunteers for an experimental procedure that would restore his vision. There is a side effect, however: even though he can see, he can only see in blinding, disorienting colors. This drives him insane, and he adopts the identity of Crazy Quilt.
Crazy Quilt	Gail Simone; Dale Eaglesham	Villains United #2 (August 2005)	Apparently, the new Secret Society of Super Villains, led by Alexander Luthor Jr., has in its roster a new version of Crazy Quilt; a woman with the characteristic costume and vision-helmet of the previous villain. Only glimpsed in the background, she has yet to resurface.
Crime Doctor	Bill Finger; Bob Kane	Detective Comics #77 (July 1943)	**Matthew Thorne** was a reputable surgeon for criminals, but he would stop his crimes to minister to the sick or injured. He later appears under the new name of Bradford Thorne. He is an expert in torture.
Crimesmith	Marv Wolfman; Jim Aparo	Batman #443 (January 1990)	**Doctor Ryan Smith** is a brilliant scientist and media personality. He gives detailed plans for robberies to gangs of crooks with the understanding that they would give him a large percentage of the loot.
Crimson Knight	Dave Wood; Sheldon Moldoff	Detective Comics #271 (September 1959)	The Crimson Knight, whose real name is **Dick Lyons**, is a mysterious metal-clad crime fighter who appears in Gotham City as an apparent aide to Batman and Robin. The Caped Crusaders suspect the new arrival may have illegal motives.
Cryonic Man	Mike W. Barr; Jim Aparo	Batman and the Outsiders #6 (January 1984)	**Philip** was a lab assistant for Professor Niles Raymond who developed a cryogenic chamber. Fearful of the threat of nuclear war, Raymond froze himself, Philip, and their wives in 1947 in hopes of surviving any oncoming conflict. Decades later, Philip was chosen to be awakened to determine if the world had become a safe place again. However, Philip's wife was inflicted with a debilitating disease and he subjected themselves to the freezing process in hopes of waking up in a time with the medical advances to save her life. Becoming the Cryonic Man, Philip sought organs to replace those of his wife which were failing, bringing him into conflict with Batman and the Outsiders.
Cyber-C.A.T.	Doug Moench; Jim Balent	Catwoman (vol. 2) #42 (February 1997)	**Christina Chiles** is a scientist who designed a state of the art robotic suit operated by her brainwaves, bristling with weapons like lasers and rockets. When the Catwoman broke into the lab to steal a microchip, Christina dons the suit herself to stop her as a trial run. After they clash several times, Chiles gets obsessed with hunting down and destroying the Catwoman to prove her superiority — a side effect of the suit's mind-link. Eventually, the Catwoman defeats her after building a robotic suit for herself.
Cypher	Chuck Dixon; Michael Netzer	Detective Comics #657 (March 1993)	**Avery Twombey** is a corporate spy and mercenary with hypnotic abilities, though his actual past is unknown. When the government hired three separate companies, including Wayne Enterprises, to start working on different pieces of a secret military project, Cypher was hired to assassinate the three CEOs of the companies. After successfully killing two of the CEOs, he went after Wayne Enterprises' CEO Lucius Fox. As he was about to force Lucius Fox to jump off a bridge via hypnotic suggestion, he was taken down by Robin (Tim Drake) as Fox was saved by Batman and Azrael. Cypher was sent to Blackgate Penitentiary. At Blackgate, Cypher formulated an escape plan with other inmates, including the Cluemaster, the Electrocutioner, and the Baffler. After a failed attempt to use his abilities on the other inmates, who evaded his hypnotism with earplugs, Cypher was shot and killed by the Cluemaster.
Dagger	Gerry Conway; Gene Colan	Batman #343 (January 1982)	**David Rennington** is the owner of a blade manufacturing company called Rennington Steel. When facing hard times, Rennington becomes the Dagger, running an old-fashioned protection racket until being apprehended by Batman. He is later recruited by Ra's al Ghul.
Dark Knight	Scott Snyder; Rafael Albuquerque	All-Star Batman #11 (August 2017)	A clone of Alfred Pennyworth who was created by Briar.
Anatoly Davidovich and Vassily Davidovich / The Davidovich Brothers	Fabian Nicieza; Kevin Maguire	Batman Confidential #19 (September 2008)	**Anatoly and Vassily Davidovich** are brothers who are members of an unidentified branch of the Russian Mafia.
Deacon Blackfire	Jim Starlin; Bernie Wrightson	Batman: The Cult #1 (August 1988)	**Deacon Joseph Blackfire** is a religious fanatic who forms an army in the sewers beneath Gotham, largely composed of the homeless. Blackfire begins a violent war on crime, which escalates into him taking over the entire city, isolating it from the rest of the country.
Dealer	Scott Snyder; Jock	Batman #872 (February 2011)	Primarily an enemy to Dick Grayson, **the Dealer** is an auctioneer who sells to the wealthy memorabilia and weapons used by, or that have formerly belonged to, reputable supervillains.
Death Rattle	Dan Slott; Ryan Sook	Arkham Asylum: Living Hell #1 (July 2003)	**Erasmus Rayne** is a serial killer and a cult leader.
Doctor Aesop	Paul Dini; Dustin Nguyen	Detective Comics #846 (September 2008)	**Dr. Aesop** is a criminal who commits crimes based on Aesop's Fables. He is an old man who carries a cane, which he wields as a deadly weapon. He keeps a menagerie of dangerous animals, which represent some of the fables he seems to cherish. Dr. Aesop was seemingly killed, but recovered from his wounds and later resurfaced in Gotham City Sirens #9.
Doctor Double X	Dave Wood; Sheldon Moldoff; Bob Kane	Detective Comics #261 (November 1958)	**Dr. Simon Ecks** discovers that human auras could be enhanced to function outside of the body. When Ecks creates an energy-duplicate of himself, his mind becomes dominated by the doppelgänger, who calls himself Doctor Double X.
Doctor Fang	Doug Moench; Gene Colan	Detective Comics #536 (March 1984)	**Dr. Fang** is a criminal mastermind who was killed by Night-Slayer.
Doctor No-Face	Dave Wood; Sheldon Moldoff	Detective Comics #319 (September 1963)	**Bart Magan** tried to use a device that would erase a facial scar, but ended up erasing his entire face.
Doctor Phosphorus	Steve Englehart	Detective Comics #469 (May 1977)	**Alexander James Sartorius** is a mad criminal with radioactive powers resulting from the meltdown of a Gotham nuclear power plant.
Doctor Zodiac	Leo Dorfman; Curt Swan	World's Finest Comics #160 (September 1966)	**Theodore B. Carrigan** is a carnival mystic who turns to crime, basing his robberies on horoscopes. In his first outing, he is apprehended by Batman, Robin, and Superman. Later, he steals 12 coins from Atlantis, each bearing a Zodiac symbol, which bestow him with various powers. Once again, Batman and Superman thwart his plans. Still later, he allies himself with Madame Zodiac to obtain a different set of Zodiac coins, but the two of them are defeated by Batman, Superman, and Zatanna.
Dodge	Adam Beechen; Freddie Williams II	Robin (vol. 4) #160 (March 2007)	**Michael Lasky** was just a kid who wanted to be a hero. He ran into Robin a few times and tried become Robin's partner, but Robin refused since he just got in the way and told him to go home. One night as Robin was trying to stop some kidnappers, Dodge interfered and his teleportation belt got damaged. Dodge was left in a coma after the battle and Robin took him to a hospital. Robin, feeling responsible for Dodge's condition, visited him regularly until one day, he disappeared. In the future, Dodge would return, but not as his former self; his skin had been turned to a shimmering red and he was furious with Robin. He had fallen into a life of crime, selling a dangerous drug that turned normal people into metahuman murderers. His criminal enterprise was built upon the hope that he would eventually meet Robin again and kill him. During a battle with Robin, Zatara, and Rose Wilson, his body inexplicably vanished and he is presumed dead.
Doodlebug	Dan Slott; Ryan Sook	Arkham Asylum: Living Hell #1 (July 2003)	**Daedalus Boch** is an artist who believes he receives visions of inspiration and then compulsively recreates them on whatever canvas they indicate, including people.
Danny the Dummy	Bill Finger; Sheldon Moldoff	Batman #134 (September 1960)	**Danny the Dummy**, a pint-sized ventriloquist in a top hat and suit, has a hit act in which he plays the dummy to a normal-sized "ventriloquist" named Matt (who is revealed as the real dummy at the end of each show). The fact that people invariably refer to Danny as "the Dummy" infuriates him and inspires him to use ventriloquist's dummies for crime to make dummies out of the law.
Egghead	William Dozier; Stanley Ralph Ross; Edwin Self	Batman: Shadow of the Bat #3 (Note: Egghead was originally introduced in the 1960s Batman TV series episodes "An Egg Grows in Gotham" / "The Yegg Foes in Gotham", which first aired on October 19–20, 1966. Batman: Shadow of the Bat #3 (August 1992) was the character's first comic book appearance.) (August 1992)	**Edgar Heed** believes himself to be "the world's smartest criminal", and his crimes usually have an egg motif to them, as well as including egg puns in his speech whenever appropriate. The character is an inmate of Arkham Asylum and patient of Jeremiah Arkham.
Eivol Ekdal	John Broome; Sheldon Moldoff	Detective Comics #346 (December 1965)	**Eivol Ekdal** is a bald, slightly hunchbacked criminal scientist who is described as a "master craftsman, builder of escape gadgets and tantalizing traps for the criminal underground of America." He encounters Batman twice, before meeting his death at the hands of a couple of his criminal "customers".
Elemental Man	Bill Finger; Sheldon Moldoff	Detective Comics #294 (August 1961)	**John Dolan** was exposed to a leak from an experiment the professor he assisted was working on, leaving him randomly turning into different elements. Designing a belt to control these transformations, he took to a life of crime as the Elemental Man before Batman was able to restore him. Strike Force Kobra had a member fashioned after Dolan named the Elemental Woman.
Eraser	Robert Kanigher; Sheldon Moldoff	Batman #188 (December 1966)	**Leonard Fiasco** is a professional at covering the tracks of other crimes. For a 20% cut, the Eraser will "erase" the evidence of another crime.
Executioner	Dick Sprang	Detective Comics #191 (January 1953)	**Willy Hooker** is a vigilante who murders wanted criminals for the reward money.
Facade	Paul Dini; J. H. Williams III	Detective Comics #821 (September 2006)	**Erik Hanson** is a former employee at a trendy Gotham City nightclub for the city's popular socialites. He organizes a gang to replace them as a ploy to enter Gotham's elite.
False-Face	Bill Finger; Sheldon Moldoff	Batman #113 (February 1958)	False-Face is a criminal make-up artist and master of disguise who uses his skill to impersonate wealthy people.
Firebug	Len Wein; Irv Novick	Batman #318 (December 1979)	An African American former soldier and demolitions expert, **Joseph Rigger** returned to find his family dead due to substandard housing in three separate buildings. As Firebug, Rigger seeks revenge on the buildings themselves, destroying them regardless of how many innocents die. He later turns to more straightforward crime. His weapon of choice is explosive bombs.
Firebug	Ed Brubaker; Michael Lark	Gotham Central #3 (March 2003)	**Harlan Combs** is wanted in the murder of his daughter. Combs had purchased the Firebug costume and armor from Rigger. He is injured while fleeing from the police and quickly arrested.
Firebug	Christos N. Gage; Steven Cummings	Deadshot: Urban Renewal #1 (February 2005)	An unnamed man won the Firebug costume and armor in an Internet auction. After taking on the identity of the Firebug, he enters the supervillain business.
Firefly	Bill Finger; Sheldon Moldoff	Batman #126 (September 1959)	**Ted Carson** was a man of wealth before he gambled away his fortune. Desperate, Carson turned to crime, becoming Firefly.
Famine	Geoff Johns; Grant Morrison; Greg Rucka; Mark Waid	52 #26 (2006)	**Famine** is one of the Horsemen of Apokolips who once posed as Sobek, a friend to Black Adam.
Film Freak	Doug Moench; Tom Mandrake	Batman #395 (May 1986)	**Burt Weston** is a wannabe actor who dreams of getting a big break by playing quirky villains. When each of his plans fails, he fakes his death similar to the movie The Sting. He is later killed by Bane.
Film Freak	Will Pfeifer; David López	Catwoman (vol. 2) #54 (June 2006)	The second Film Freak is only known as "**Edison**". Following the Infinite Frontier relaunch, he acts as a member of the Suicide Squad alongside the Peacemaker, Bolt and the Shrike, but is inadvertently hit by a Joker laughing gas bomb and killed.
Fright	Judd Winick; Dustin Nguyen	Batman #627 (July 2004)	**Linda Friitawa** is an albino geneticist who was stripped of her medical license for her unauthorized, gruesome experiments on human beings. She assisted the Scarecrow with his experiments. However, unbeknownst to the Scarecrow, she was secretly hired by the Penguin to corrupt the Scarecrow's toxins and infect the Scarecrow with them, causing him to transform into a creature dubbed "the Scarebeast". In contrast to her deeds and the Penguin, Friitawa always treated the Scarecrow with kindness.
Gearhead	Chuck Dixon; Graham Nolan	Detective Comics #712 (August 1997)	**Nathan Finch** had lost his arms and legs when frostbite affected him after a fight with Batman. An unnamed underworld doctor replaces them with cybernetic limbs.
General	Chuck Dixon; Michael Netzer	Detective Comics #654 (December 1992)	See also: Anarky. **Ulysses Hadrian Armstrong** was a brilliant military strategist who also happened to be a psychopathic, murderous eight-year-old child. Called the General, he was obsessed with war and victory and embarked on his plan of declaring war on Gotham City. Subsequent depictions toned down the character's violent streak somewhat, though he was still dangerous. He was later seen as an adolescent who briefly took on the persona of the new Anarky. During DC Rebirth, Ulysses is a seen as a young genius working for a military organization, where he is depicted as a cheerful yet sociopathic adolescent who goes by Th3 G3n3r4l online.
Gentleman Ghost	Robert Kanigher; Joe Kubert	Flash Comics #88 (October 1947)	Primarily a Hawkman foe, the specter once named **James Craddock** often finds himself at odds with Batman.
Getaway Genius	Gardner Fox; Sheldon Moldoff	Batman #170 (March 1965)	**The Getaway Genius (Roy Reynolds)** is a criminal and getaway mastermind who has encountered Batman several times.
Globe	Paul Dini; Dustin Nguyen	Detective Comics #840 (March 2008)	**Hammond Carter** is obsessed with maps and "plots crimes by latitude, longitude, time zones, and the shape of landmasses."
Gorilla Boss	David Vern Reed; Lew Sayre Schwartz	Batman #75 (February–March 1953)	Mobster **George "Boss" Dyke** is executed in the gas chamber, but has his brain transplanted into the body of a gorilla. The Gorilla Boss of Gotham City fights Batman twice. Later, the alien villain Sinestro steals the Gorilla Boss' cerebellum, expands it to planet-size, and uses it as a power source. This unnatural abomination is destroyed by Superman. Later, however, the Gorilla Boss is returned to life in his gorilla body and is used as a pawn by Gorilla Grodd.
Gunhawk	Chuck Dixon; Graham Nolan	Detective Comics #674 (May 1994)	Liam Hawkleigh is a highly-paid mercenary who has encountered Batman and Robin several times. He had a female companion named Gunbunny, later known as Pistolera, who was a member of the Ravens. After the death of Pistolera (see below), Gunhawk gets himself a new female partner named Gunbunny.
Gustav DeCobra	Elliot S. Maggin; Mike Grell	Detective Comics #455 (January 1976)	**Gustav DeCobra** is a vampire, very much in the classic Dracula mold, whom Bruce Wayne and Alfred Pennyworth stumble upon in a seemingly abandoned house after their car overheats in the countryside.
Harley Sinn	Jimmy Palmiotti; Frank Tieri; Mauricet	Harley Quinn and her Gang of Harleys – The Shady Bunch #1 (April 2016)	**Constance Brand, a.k.a. Harley Sinn**, is the daughter of a real estate billionaire who is obsessed with Harley Quinn. She has recently been released from Arkham Asylum.
Harpy	Doug Moench; Jim Aparo	Batman #481 (July 1992)	**Iris** was Maxie Zeus' girlfriend when he was in Arkham Asylum. She fought Batman after gaining super-strength and agility, but was defeated by him.
Hatman	Bill Finger; Sheldon Moldoff	Detective Comics #230 (April 1956)	A thief obsessed with stealing hats, he desires most to acquire Batman's cowl, even if it means killing Batman. Initially presented as "Jervis Tetch", and working under the alias **Mad Hatter**, the character was retroactively stated to be an impostor. When the original Mad Hatter returned, he claimed to have disposed of the impostor, though the impostor was eventually shown to still be alive. The character is currently working under the moniker of "the Hatman".
Headhunter	Jim Aparo; Doug Moench	Batman #487 (December 1992)	**The Headhunter** is an assassin who attempts to kill James Gordon, but is thwarted by Batman. The Headhunter is accustomed to eliminating his targets by shooting them twice in the head. He was killed by the Swamp Thing in Batman #23 (2017).
Humpty Dumpty	Dan Slott; Ryan Sook	Arkham Asylum: Living Hell #2 (August 2003)	**Humphrey Dumpler**, a large, portly, well-mannered man, is obsessed with putting broken things back together again, even if he has to take them apart. Thinking that his abusive grandmother is broken, Dumpler dismembers and reassembles her in an attempt to "fix" her.
Huntress	Mort Meskin	Sensation Comics #68 (August 1947)	**Paula Brooks** has battled various members of the Batman family.
Jane Doe	Dan Slott; Ryan Sook	Arkham Asylum: Living Hell #1 (July 2003)	**Jane Doe** is a cipher who obsessively learns her victims' personality and mannerisms, then kills them and assumes their identity by wearing their skin, eventually becoming that individual, at least in her own mind.
Johnny Stitches	Frank Tieri; Jim Calafiore	Gotham Underground #3 (February 2008)	**Johnny Denetto** was the right-hand man of Tobias Whale. After Tobias Whale moved his operations from Metropolis to Gotham, Denetto ran afoul of his boss and had his skin peeled off while being kept alive. Denetto was saved by Bruno Mannheim, his skin sewn together and reattached by DeSaad, becoming Mannheim's contractor in Intergang's bid to take over organized crime in Gotham.
Johnny Warlock	Bill Willingham; Rick Mays	Robin (vol. 4) #121 (February 2004)	A cruel enforcer working for mob boss Henry Aquista in Gotham City, **Johnny Warren** is fused with a demonic artifact, gaining tremendous power, but also losing a certain amount of free will. He encounters Robin and the Spoiler in his attempt to take over Aquista's operation, but burns his energy out. He then heads to Istanbul, determined in time to return to Gotham and get his revenge on the Boy Wonder.
Johnny Witts	Gardner Fox; Sheldon Moldoff	Detective Comics #344 (October 1965)	**Johnny Witts** is the arrogant self-proclaimed "Crime-Boss Who's Always One Step Ahead of Batman!" Johnny Witts employs quick-thinking and quick reflexes to outwit Batman. He has countered Batman in disguise as "the Swami".
Junkyard Dog	Dan Slott; Ryan Sook	Arkham Asylum: Living Hell #1 (July 2003)	**Tucker Long** is completely obsessed with scavenging prizes and treasures from garbage. He apparently has the ability to create all manner of functional items — especially weapons — from junk. He is killed by fellow Arkham inmate Doodlebug.
Key	John Broome; Frank Giacoia	All Star Comics #57 (February 1951)	The original Key was the head of a major crime syndicate and used various agents around the world in his misdeeds. He presumably died after he leaped out of a cable car moving over a gorge.
Key	Gardner Fox; Mike Sekowsky	Justice League of America #41 (December 1965)	The second **Key** (real name unknown) was originally a chemist with Intergang. He developed mind-expanding "psycho-chemicals" that helped activate his senses and allowed him to plan crimes mere humans could never hope to understand. Being an enemy of the Justice League as a whole, Batman was his primary enemy. In one of his most famous encounters with the Dark Knight, he tried to provoke Batman into murdering him so he could escape life itself, but the plan was unsuccessful.
King of the Cats	Bill Finger; Lew Sayre Schwartz	Batman #69 (February 1952)	Not to be confused with the Catman, **Karl Kyle** is the brother and former cat-themed partner of the Catwoman.
King Cobra	Bill Finger; Sheldon Moldoff	Batman #139 (April 1961)	The **King Cobra** is a cobra-themed costumed crime boss, not to be confused with the Copperhead, King Snake, or Kobra.
King Snake	Chuck Dixon; Tom Lyle	Robin (vol. 4) #4 (February 1991)	**Sir Edmund Dorrance** is a martial artist who becomes a mercenary, offering his professional expertise to various anti-communist rebels, and apparently made a great deal of money in doing so. While in Santa Prisca working with local rebels, his camp is taken by surprise by government commandos and he is blinded by gunfire. He flees to Hong Kong and becomes a businessman and the leader of the feared Ghost Dragons. He eventually gravitates to Gotham, where he seizes control of the Chinatown district from the Triad gangs. This does not last long, however, and he loses control of the gang, causing him to join the terrorist cult Kobra. It is later revealed that he is the biological father of Bane. Bane tracks down his father, where King Snake tries to have his son help him in taking over Kobra. The struggle results in King Snake's apparent death.
King Tut	Earl Barret; Robert C. Dennis	Batman Confidential #26 (Note: King Tut was originally introduced in the 1960s Batman TV series episodes "The Curse of Tut" / "The Pharaoh's in a Rut", which first aired on April 13–14, 1966. Batman Confidential #26 (February 2009) was the character's first comic book appearance.) (April 2009)	**Victor Goodman** is an Egyptian-themed supervillain who leaves behind clues at the scene of his crimes in a similar fashion to the Riddler.
Kobra	Martin Pasko; Jack Kirby; Steve Sherman; Pablo Marcos	Kobra #1 (February 1976)	**Jeffrey Burr** and his twin brother, Jason Burr, were born as conjoined twins (with a psychic link to one another) but were kidnapped and separated from each other's bodies soon after their birth by the Cult of the Kobra God because a prophecy stated he would lead them to world domination. As they grew, Jeffrey became a terrorist and mad scientist, taking on the name "Kobra" as the leader of the cult. After Jason began working with another organization to combat Kobra and his cult, Kobra killed Jason, only to be haunted by visions of his deceased brother. He came into conflict with Batman after he began using Lazarus Pits of his own creation. Both Kobra and his organization would go on to fight many other heroes and a rival criminal organization called SKULL. Kobra is finally captured and eventually murdered by Black Adam. Following the death of their leader, Jeffrey Burr, Kobra resurrects Jason Burr. Jason Burr follows in his brother's footsteps and becomes the second Kobra.
Lark	Marv Wolfman; Jim Aparo	Batman #448 (June 1990)	The Penguin's personal chauffeur and bodyguard. **Lark** was noted as having remarkable strength by Batman and managed to keep the Penguin alive when Black Mask was after him.
Lady Vic	Chuck Dixon; Scott McDaniel	Nightwing (vol. 2) #4 (January 1997)	**Lady Elaine Marsh-Morton** is a woman hailing from a rich British family. She becomes a hired assassin to prevent foreclosure on her family estate.
Lazara	Paul Dini	Batman: Mr. Freeze (Note: Nora Fries was originally introduced in the Batman: The Animated Series episode "Heart of Ice", which first aired on September 7, 1992. Batman: Mr. Freeze (May 1997) was the character's first comic book appearance. Nora Fries did not become Lazara until Batgirl #70 (January 2006).) (May 1997)	**Nora Fries**, Mr. Freeze's wife, is resurrected by a Lazarus Pit by Nyssa Raatko and now possesses the ability to manipulate flame and reanimate the dead.
Lock-Up	Paul Dini; Marty Isenberg; Robert N. Skir	Robin (vol. 4) #24 (Note: Lock-Up was originally introduced in the Batman: The Animated Series episode "Lock-Up", which first aired on November 19, 1994. Robin (vol. 4) #24 (January 1996) was the character's first comic book appearance.) (January 1996)	**Lyle Bolton** is a former security guard who is obsessed with order and becomes a costumed vigilante who brutalizes criminals. Unlike Batman, however, he is willing and eager to kill them. He sets up a private prison for costumed villains.
Lord Death Man	Robert Kanigher; Sheldon Moldoff	Batman #180 (May 1966)	**Lord Death Man** is a Japanese criminal who wears a skeleton outfit. Originally, he could put himself into a yoga trance to trick people into thinking he was dead, but when the character was revived, he received "upgrades".
Lump	Jack Kirby	Mister Miracle #7 (April 1972)	**The Lump** is a living psychological weapon created by the malevolent New Gods of Apokolips that was used to mentally torture Batman during the Final Crisis.
Lunkhead	Dan Slott; Ryan Sook	Arkham Asylum: Living Hell #1 (July 2003)	**Lunkhead** is a large, imposing, somewhat deformed bruiser of a man. He is killed by demons tricked by the Ventriloquist as revenge for destroying his dummy, Scarface.
Lynx	Chuck Dixon; Tom Lyle	Robin (vol. 4) #1 (January 1991)	**Ling** is a beautiful martial artist and a member of the Parisian branch of the Ghost Dragons, a Chinese youth gang that serves King Snake. For failing to kill Tim Drake, King Snake takes out her left eye. Eventually, she takes control of the Ghost Dragons and attempts to expand their Gotham territory. She is later killed during an encounter with Batgirl.
Mabuse	Devin Grayson; Paul Ryan	Batman: Gotham Knights #3 (May 2000)	**Mabuse** is a common street criminal, a "geek" in a suit of armor made from a trashcan, who faces a young Batman early in the Dark Knight's career. He is responsible for breaking Batman's nose in a fight.
Madame Zodiac	Bob Rozakis; Don Heck	Batman Family #17 (April–May 1978)	**Madame Zodiac** first appears committing horoscope-themed crimes in Gotham City, but is defeated by Batgirl, Batwoman, and the Earth-Two Huntress. Later, she allies herself with Dr. Zodiac to obtain a set of Zodiac coins, but the two of them are defeated by Batman, Superman, and Zatanna. Recently, she reappeared helping the Riddler in solving a mystery.
Magician	Andy Lanning; Anthony Williams	Batman: Legends of the Dark Knight #95 (June 1997)	A team of alternating crooks and killers who made it appear as though they were one mysterious, magical, and murderous villain known as the **Magician**, pulling off heists and killings around the world.
Magpie	John Byrne	The Man of Steel #3 (November 1986)	**Margaret Pye** is a jewel thief who targets jewels named after birds and then replaces the jewels with booby-trapped replicas. She is named for the magpie, which in folklore is attracted to bright, shiny things.
March Hare	Paul Dini; Dustin Nguyen	Detective Comics #841 (April 2008)	**Harriet Pratt** is an Alice's Adventures in Wonderland-themed supervillainess and a member of the Mad Hatter's (Jervis Tetch) Wonderland Gang. She is also referred to as March Harriet.
Matatoa "the Eater of Souls"	Devin Grayson; Roger Robinson	Batman: Gotham Knights #16 (June 2001)	Nicknamed "the Eater of Souls", **Matatoa** is an immortal cursed with killing people to consume their souls and essence to maintain his existence. He traveled to Gotham to battle Batman after a voice in his head told him to seek out an "undefeated warrior" so he could take his soul. Batman was able to beat Matatoa.
Mekros	Doug Moench; Mike Manley	Batman #501 (November 1993)	**Mekros** is an assassin who was hired by Don Mercante in a failed attempt to kill Batman.
Metalhead	Doug Moench; Jim Aparo	Batman #486 (November 1992)	During his search for Black Mask, an exhausted Batman comes across a series of waterfront taverns filled with mauled, bloody inhabitants. After interrogating one of many severely injured victims, he finds the whereabouts of the so-called "**Metalhead**" at the local cemetery in the Sionis family crypt, the resting place of Black Mask's family.
Mime	Max Allan Collins; Dave Cockrum	Batman #412 (October 1987)	**Camilla Ortin** is a girl who commits crimes dressed as a mime artist. She seldom speaks, which leads people to think she is mute.
Mirage	Gerry Conway; Don Newton	Detective Comics #511 (February 1982)	"Mike" (alias **Kerry Austin**) is a common man who takes a course at the Academy of Crime and starts using illusions as a gimmick villain. He fights Batman twice and the Manhunter (Mark Shaw) once. He is killed by Bruno Mannheim, who bashes the Mirage's head into the "Crime Bible"; then sends his body into the kitchen.
Mirror Man	Bill Finger; Sheldon Moldoff	Detective Comics #213 (November 1954)	**Floyd Ventris** is a criminal scientist who uses mirrors in his crimes in a fashion similar to the Mirror Master. In both his meetings with Batman, Ventris tries to expose Batman's secret identity.
Mister Camera	David Vern Reed; Sheldon Moldoff	Batman #81 (February 1954)	**Mr. Camera** is a camera-headed villain who uses cameras in his crimes.
Mister Cipher	Bill Finger; Lew Sayre Schwartz	Batman #71 (June 1952)	Not to be confused with Cypher (see above), **Mr. Cipher** is a masked criminal who was killed after a confrontation with Batman.
Mister ESPER / Captain Calamity	John Broome; Sheldon Moldoff	Detective Comics #352 (June 1966)	An inventor builds an ultrasonic projector able to put "telepathic" suggestions in people, specifically Batman, to distract him from his main crime. Later, as **Captain Calamity**, he improved his device so it could tap into the psychic powers of some people, namely Titans member Lilith.
Mister Polka-Dot / The Polka-Dot Man	Bill Finger; Sheldon Moldoff	Detective Comics #300 (February 1962)	**Abner Krill** turns the polka-dots covering his costume into a variety of weapons.
Mister ZZZ	Paul Dini; Don Kramer	Detective Comics #824 (December 2006)	**Mister ZZZ**, a Gotham City gangster who acts as a muscle for Little Italy. He appears to be half-asleep all the time.
Mole	Edmond Hamilton; Dick Sprang	World's Finest Comics #80 (January–February 1956)	A minor criminal named **Harrah**, nicknamed "the Mole", tries to tunnel into the Gotham City Bank, but is stopped by Batman and Superman. Years later, during a tunnel prison break, Harrah almost drowns in a wave of toxic sewage that mutates him into a mole-like creature. During a second clash with Batman, the Mole is knocked into a flooded cavern of the Batcave and washed away, his ultimate fate unknown.
Monarch of Menace	Robert Kanigher; Sheldon Moldoff	Detective Comics #350 (April 1966)	In the early days of Batman's career, the **Monarch of Menace** represented the Dark Knight's only failure, being the first criminal ever to defeat Batman and leave Gotham with a fortune in stolen goods. Years later, however, the Monarch's teenage son tries to prove himself using his father's outfit in a crime spree. The young Monarch of Menace is defeated by Robin, while his father is lured out of hiding by Batman, who then finally defeats his old nemesis.
Monk	Gardner Fox; Bob Kane; Sheldon Moldoff	Detective Comics #31 (September 1939)	**The Monk** is one of the early Batman villains. He wore a red cassock with a hood that bore a skull and crossbones on it. The Monk turned out to be a vampire who has powers of hypnotism and the ability to turn into a wolf. He was destroyed by being shot with a silver bullet while asleep in his coffin, along with his vampiric assistant Dala. His battle with Batman was the first multi-part Batman adventure. The Monk's hood has been in a glass display case in the Batcave ever since, in all subsequent official continuities.
Mortician	Devin Grayson; Roger Robinson	Batman: Gotham Knights #28 (June 2002)	**Porter Vito** was trying some reanimation techniques to raise his dead parents, but when one of his zombies killed someone, he felt remorse and gave up his plans.
Mortimer Kadaver	Alan Grant; John Wagner; Norm Breyfogle	Detective Comics #588 (July 1988)	**Mortimer Kadaver** is a murderous criminal possessing a morbid obsession with death. Kadaver enjoys feigning his own death and his hideout is filled with a wide variety of means of murder and torture.
Music Meister	Michael Jelenic; James Tucker	Batman: The Brave and the Bold episode "Mayhem of the Music Meister!" (October 23, 2009)	The **Music Meister** is a metahuman with a hypnotic voice that forces others to obey him and act as though they were in a musical.
Mutant Leader	Frank Miller	The Dark Knight Returns (February–June 1986)	In the Frank Miller Batman Universe, the unnamed **Mutant Leader** was the leader of a gang known as the Mutants until the Batman came out of retirement and defeated the Mutant Leader, dismantling the Mutants.
Narcosis	Alan Grant; Dave Taylor	Batman: Shadow of the Bat #50 (May 1996)	Real name unknown; **Narcosis** uses dream-inducing gasses to rob his victims of their sense of reality. His mother was a lush and his father was a thief. They were both sent away and he was neglectfully passed around the city. At the age of five, his face was horrifically burned in a kitchen accident and, coupled with his family being split up, he began having chronic nightmares. He hates Gotham for being neglectful and wishes to plunge the city into an ever-lasting nightmare.
Nicodemus	Ed Brubaker; Scott McDaniel	Batman #601 (May 2002)	**Thomas Hart** is a masked figure in Gotham City who kidnaps corrupt city officials and burns them to death. He, like the Batman, had lost his parents to a Gotham crime at an early age.
Nocturna	Doug Moench; Don Newton; Gene Colan	Detective Comics #529 (August 1983)	**Natalia Knight** (originally called Natasha in the three-issue arc that introduces her) is a thief and manipulator whose skin was bleached pale white by an experimental laser in a work-related accident. She is an astronomer at Gotham City's observatory and an employee of Wayne Enterprises. Sensitive to light, she prefers to operate in darkness, though she always had an affinity for the night prior to her accident.
NKVDemon	Marv Wolfman; Jim Aparo	Batman #445 (March 1990)	**Gregor Dosynski** is the protégé of KGBeast who tries to kill a list of 10 Soviet government officials in Moscow, considering them traitors to the cause of Communism. He is killed by police gunfire in an attempt to assassinate the 10th person on his list, then-General Secretary Mikhail Gorbachev.
NKVDemon	Shaun McLaughlin; Ken Hooper	Aquaman (vol. 4) #8 (July 1992)	An assassin named **Nicodemus** (not to be confused with Thomas Hart, who is also known as Nicodemus) takes up the mantle and costume of the original NKVDemon and is hired to kill Aquaman. He is defeated by Aquaman and Batman and eventually killed while in jail.
NKVDemon	Chuck Dixon; Eduardo Barreto	Robin (vol. 4) #47 (November 1997)	The third **NKVDemon** initially works for Ulysses Armstrong. More recently, he served as the bodyguard to the head of the Gotham Odessa crime family and was killed in the shootout that incited the Gotham gang war.
Ogre and Ape	Doug Moench; Kelley Jones	Batman #535 (October 1996)	**Michael Adams** is a genetically altered man whose "brother" is a genetically enhanced gorilla. The Ogre has increased strength and the Ape has increased intelligence. The Ogre tracks and murders the scientists who had conducted the extremely inhumane experiments that created them while killing countless other test subjects, only to be tracked by Batman himself. In the end, the Ape is killed and the Ogre wanders aimlessly through Gotham City.
Orca	Larry Hama; Scott McDaniel	Batman #579 (July 2000)	**Grace Balin** is a marine biologist who transforms herself into a monstrous human/orca hybrid, first attempting to steal a valuable necklace. She is among the villains who were killed by Tally Man.
Outsider	Gardner Fox; Carmine Infantino	Detective Comics #356 (Note: The Outsider first made an off-panel cameo in Detective Comics #334 (December 1964). The character's actual first appearance was in Detective Comics #356 (October 1966). Alfred Pennyworth, an alternative incarnation of the Outsider, first appeared in Batman #16 (April 1943).) (October 1966)	The Outsider is the Earth-3 incarnation of **Alfred Pennyworth** and the leader of the Secret Society of Super Villains.
Panara	Chuck Dixon; Jim Balent	Catwoman (vol. 2) #37 (September 1996)	**Ms. Dorsey** is a young woman who is diagnosed with an incurable disease. She seeks the aid of a geneticist who specializes in radical cures for illnesses. He traps the Catwoman, believing her to be a were-cat and thinking her to have special DNA, to use in Dorsey's cure, but finds that she was a "mere human".
Penny Plunderer	Bill Finger; Bob Kane	World's Finest Comics #30 (September–October 1947)	**Joe Coyne**, a thief obsessed with penny-oriented crimes, starts his career selling newspapers for pennies. He is later caught stealing pennies and gets the electric chair. The giant penny on display in the Batcave, which has been a longtime staple of Batman's lair, was originally one of the Penny Plunderer's devices.
Pistolera	Chuck Dixon; Graham Nolan; Scott Hanna	Detective Comics #674 (May 1994)	**Gunbunny** (real name unknown) is a costumed criminal and the former partner and lover of Gunhawk. After a falling out with Gunhawk, she became a western-themed villainess known as Pistolera and joined a group called the Ravens. She is later shot and killed by Deadshot.
Pix	Scott Beatty	Batman: Gotham Knights #34 (December 2002)	**Ariadne Pixnit** is an avant-garde tattoo artist who used "nanite-ink", a nanobot-filled color matrix that she could program to form itself into designs on her subjects. After being beaten and raped by a street gang, Pixnit works undercover at her attackers' favorite tattoo shop, designing lethal tattoos (swords, scorpions, etc.) that she brings to "life" via computer to dispatch the gang members one by one. She later injects a large amount of the nanite-ink into her skull, giving her the ability to create creatures and weapons on her skin that she could animate and use against Batman.
Planet Master	Bill Finger; Jim Mooney	Detective Comics #296 (October 1961)	**Professor Norbert** starts a crime wave using gimmicks based on the nine planets after inhaling a strange gas which turns him into a "Jekyll and Hyde"-like character. After the gas's effect wears off, it is revealed that Norbert's assistant Edward Burke manipulated him into committing the crimes. Later, Burke becomes the second Planet Master and appears as a member of Kobra's Strike Force Kobra. Much later, he appears as part of the Secret Society of Super Villains during the Infinite Crisis.
Professor Carl Kruger	Gardner Fox; Bob Kane	Detective Comics #33 (November 1939)	**Professor Krueger** is a mad scientist who uses elaborate schemes and devices to battle Batman.
Professor Achilles Milo	Bill Finger; Sheldon Moldoff	Detective Comics #247 (September 1957)	**Professor Achilles Milo** is a scientist who uses chemicals to battle Batman, most famously transforming Anthony Lupus into a mutated werewolf.
Professor Radium	Bill Finger; Bob Kane	Batman #8 (December 1941 – January 1942)	**Professor Henry Ross** is a scientist who is accidentally transformed into "a human radium ray". In need of an expensive antidote, Ross uses his newfound powers to commit crimes in Gotham; anxious not to hurt anyone, he accidentally kills his girlfriend, Mary Lamont. Going insane, Professor Radium finds himself battling Batman and Robin. He seems to drown in his first appearance, but returns in recent times and is revealed to have joined a subgroup of the Secret Society of Super Villains known as the Nuclear Legion.
Proteus	Steve Ditko	Beware the Creeper #2 (July 1968)	Offalian immigrant **Remington Percival Cord** escapes an environment of fear and violence of his home country to America, but finds the same brutality he escaped. Becoming a shapeshifting figure in the Gotham underworld, Proteus emerges as the arch-nemesis of the Creeper.
Puppet Master	Bill Finger; Bob Kane	Batman #3 (October 1940)	Not to be confused with the Marvel Comics character of the same name, **the Puppet Master** is a criminal who uses his thought waves and puppets to control people after an injection from a chemical weakens their will.
Queen Bee	Bob Haney; Win Mortimer	The Brave and the Bold #64 (March 1966)	**Marcia Monroe** is the spoiled daughter of a rich man who was originally rescued by Batman. She later became a member of CYCLOPS as Queen Bee.
Rainbow Creature	Bill Finger; Sheldon Moldoff	Batman #134 (September 1960)	After helping the president of a small South American republic against a dictatorial rebel, Batman and Robin are confronted with another menace — a **Rainbow Creature**. Spawned from a fiery volcano, the Rainbow Creature radiates four separate power-auras from different areas of its body. However, after using a power, the section of the Creature's body used becomes white, and it must leech color to regain its power. Batman and Robin trick the Rainbow Creature into expending all of its auras, leaving it colorless. They ram it with a log and the Beast shatters into fragments.
Raven	Sheldon Moldoff	Detective Comics #287 (January 1961)	**Joe Parker** was given the identity of Raven as a pawn for aliens Kzan and Jhorl who seek a meteorite.
Raven	Bob Rozakis; Juan Ortiz	Batman Family #18 (July 1978)	**Dave Corby** is an agent for MAZE who battled Robin and Batgirl on occasion.
Reaper	Dennis O'Neil; Neal Adams	Detective Comics #237 (December 1971)	**Dr. Benjamin Gruener** is a Holocaust survivor who took on the identity of the Reaper to exact revenge on his former Nazi captors.
Reaper	Mike W. Barr; Alan Davis	Detective Comics #575 (June 1987)	After losing his wife in a robbery, **Judson Caspian** became a vigilante and began murdering criminals.
Reaper	Mike W. Barr; Alan Davis	Batman: Full Circle (January 1991)	**Joe Chill Jr.**, the son of Joe Chill, briefly became the Reaper as part of a plan to drive Batman insane.
Roadrunner	Scott Snyder; Jock	Detective Comics #876 (April 2011)	Once an exotic car dealer, **Bixby Rhodes** took the opportunity to start smuggling guns and other firearms to the newcomers in Gotham's crime world when Gotham City's organized crime fell after the capture of Jeremiah Arkham as Black Mask. Taking up the nickname of the Roadrunner, Bixby would deliver guns in the trunks of custom-ordered cars.
Rob Callender	Bill Finger; Jerry Robinson	World's Finest Comics #11 (August–November 1943)	**Rob Callender** is a laboratory assistant from the future who became a thief after being transported to the present day.
Savage Skull	Doug Moench; Don Newton	Batman #360 (June 1983)	**Jack Crane** is a rogue cop who is fired from the Gotham City Police Department due to his illegal activities. Disfigured in an accident that burns off his skin, Crane seeks revenge as the Savage Skull, but is defeated by Batman.
Seth Wickham	Gerry Duggan; Shawn Crystal	Arkham Manor #2 (November 26, 2014)	An emotionally unstable teenager believing himself to be clinically deceased and that everyone around him is the living dead, **Seth Wickman** was committed to Arkham Manor after he attacked his mother. His condition only worsened from there, putting him directly in Batman's crosshairs.
Sewer King	Tom Ruegger; Jules Dennis; Richard Mueller	52 #25 (Note: The Sewer King was originally introduced in the Batman: The Animated Series episode, "The Underdwellers", which first aired on October 21, 1992. 52 #25 (October 2006) was the character's first comic book appearance.) (October 2006)	The **Sewer King** is a staff-carrying, sewer-dwelling villain with an army of runaway children he uses as pickpockets. He appeared among other obscure villains slain at the hands of Intergang boss Bruno Mannheim.
Signalman	Bill Finger; Sheldon Moldoff	Batman #112 (December 1957)	Phil Cobb is a small-time criminal in Gotham who is convinced that he needs a gimmick to hit it big. Inspired by the Bat-Signal, he becomes the Signalman, using signals, signs, and symbols in his crimes, but is inevitably defeated by Batman and Robin time and again. He is also a member of the Secret Society of Super Villains. For a brief time, Cobb changes his modus operandi and, inspired by the Green Arrow, commits crimes as the Blue Bowman. The Signalman is kidnapped and tortured by Dr. Moon and Phobia and is presumed deceased, but later appears as a drug-addicted informant to Black Lightning.
Snowman	Gerry Conway; Roy Thomas; José Luis García-López	Batman #337 (July 1981)	**Klaus Kristin** is the son of a male yeti and a human woman. In his first appearance, he comes to Gotham City to freeze it over, but encounters Batman in the process.
Spellbinder	John Broome; Sheldon Moldoff	Detective Comics #358 (December 1966)	**Delbert Billings** (also known as Keith Sherwood) is a painter who uses optical illusions and hypnotic weapons to commit crimes. Spellbinder is on the run from the law with his then-girlfriend, Fay Moffit, when he is confronted by the demon-lord Neron, who makes an offer of giving him his greatest desire in exchange for his soul. Spellbinder rejects the offer, but Fay shoots him in the head and takes the deal for herself, becoming the Spellbinder a.k.a. Lady Spellbinder, as a result.
Spellbinder	Gerard Jones; Chuck Wojtkiewicz	Justice League International (vol. 2) #65 (June 1994)	A genuine mystic (real name unknown) takes the name and appears as a member of the government-sanctioned "League-Busters".
Spellbinder / Lady Spellbinder	Chuck Dixon; Staz Johnson; Scott Hanna	Detective Comics #691 (November 1995)	During the Underworld Unleashed crossover event, Spellbinder (Delbert Billings) rejects Neron's offer and is shot in the head by his then-girlfriend, Fay Moffit, who then takes the deal for herself and becomes the Spellbinder, a.k.a. Lady Spellbinder, as a result.
Spider	Gerry Duggan; Shawn Crystal	Arkham Manor #2 (November 26, 2014)	The man known only as the Spider was a laborer who came to Gotham to help renovate Wayne Manor into the new Arkham Asylum after the latter had been destroyed during a year-long scheme to kill Batman. The Spider eventually gave up working and instead hid inside the walls of the new asylum, no one knowing where he had gone, waiting for the inmates to arrive. The Spider started mysteriously killing inmates, causing Batman to go undercover as the inmate Jack Shaw. Batman got into a fight late at night with the Spider, believing him to be Victor Zsasz, but the Spider escaped capture before the guards arrived. The Spider soon targeted Zsasz directly, torturing him within an inch of his life and leaving him to die. Batman eventually discovered the Spider and, after another battle, finally defeated him and threw him out a two-story window. When Batman tried to question him, the Spider simply bit off his own tongue. The serial killer was taken to a cell in the manor and chained in a straitjacket. He had burnt off his fingertips as a means of keeping his true identity secret, but Batman hoped that he would someday discover the Spider's true identity.
Spinner	Bill Finger; Sheldon Moldoff	Batman #129 (February 1960)	**Swami Ygar** is a villain in a metal-clad outfit lined with metal discs.
Spook	Frank Robbins; Irv Novick	Detective Comics #434 (April 1973)	**Val Kaliban** is one of the world's greatest escape artists, and uses his extraordinary abilities together with special effects to commit spectacular crimes and make people believe he was a real ghost. After several battles with Batman, he is killed by Damian Wayne.
Steeljacket	Chuck Dixon; Graham Nolan	Detective Comics #681 (January 1995)	**Steeljacket** is a bio-engineering experiment, a cross between man and bird. His hollow bones give him extremely light weight, allowing him to fly. However, he must wear metallic armor to protect his frail body.
Stranger	Edmond Hamilton; Bob Kane; Lew Sayre Schwartz	Batman #78 (August 1953)	Really a Martian criminal named Quork, who steals a spaceship and comes to Earth to steal weapons with his incredible technology, as weapons are outlawed on Mars. He is pursued by the First Lawmen of Mars, who team up with Batman and Robin, having observed them from Mars. The Stranger meets the lawmen but kidnaps Robin, and is tracked down by a bug the Martian Manhunter had placed in his pocket. Robin is tied to a missile which is launched but is saved, and Quork is taken back to Mars.
Sylph	Chuck Dixon; Greg Land	Nightwing #48 (October 2000)	**Sylvan Scofield** is the daughter of an inventor of a micro-thin fabric that can be manipulated into shooting out from around the wearer. Her abilities including gliding and wrapping others with the cloth. When others try to steal this invention, her father commits suicide and she goes after those she believe caused it in Blüdhaven. It was believed that she had committed suicide after her encounter with Nightwing, but that was later proven not to be the case.
Synaptic Kid	Peter Milligan; Tom Mandrake	Detective Comics #633 (August 1991)	**The Synaptic Kid** is a deformed metahuman telepath who attempts to enter Batman's mind and learn his secret identity for the purpose of blackmailing him, only to be rendered comatose when the attempt backfires.
Tally Man	Alan Grant	Batman: Shadow of the Bat #19 (October 1993)	**The Tally Man** is a killer for hire who has murdered around 60 people. He wears a mask over his face, a long purplish smock with ruffled sleeves and an oversized top hat.
Tally Man	James Robinson; Leonard Kirk	Detective Comics #819 (July 2006)	A hit man using the name "the Tally Man" later surfaces while under the employ of the Great White Shark.
Ten-Eyed Man	Frank Robbins; Irv Novick; Dick Giordano	Batman #226 (November 1970)	**Philip Reardon** is a former Vietnam War veteran and warehouse guard who is blinded in a warehouse explosion that burns his retinas. Doctor Engstrom reconnects them to his fingers. Reardon blames Batman for his blindness.
Thanatos	Gerry Conway; John Calnan	Batman #305 (November 1978)	**Thanatos** is the masked leader of the gang of terrorists known as the "Death's Head", devoted to the destruction of capitalism. The Death's Head is defeated by Batman, and Thanatos is unmasked as Sophia Santos, also known as "Lina Muller", a reporter who had associated with Batman.
Thor	Bill Finger; Sheldon Moldoff	Batman #127 (October 1959)	**Henry Meke** is proprietor of a small museum featuring replicas of mythological curios. One night, a meteorite smashed through a window, hit the Hammer of Thor, and disintegrated. The hammer began to glow and Meke reached out to examine it. After touching the hammer, he was transformed into the mighty Thor himself. The metamorphosis is repeated during thunderstorms. Thor then began a quest to finance the building of a temple to Odin by robbing banks.
Tiger Shark	Bill Finger; Dick Sprang	Detective Comics #147 (May 1949)	**Dr. Gaige** is a famous oceanographer turned gang leader. He operates at sea and at Gotham's waterfront.
Trapper	Bill Finger; Sheldon Moldoff	Detective Comics #206 (April 1954)	**Jason Bard** is a criminal who is obsessed with animal traps and uses them in his crimes. He is not to be confused with the actual Jason Bard, who is a member of the Gotham City Police Department.
Trigger Twins	Chuck Dixon; Graham Nolan	Detective Comics #666 (December 1993)	**The Trigger Twins (Thomas and Tad Trigger**) are two cowboys who grew up apart without knowing they were twins. They discover they share a great skill as gunslingers and become bandits, taking their motif from their heroic Wild West namesakes. They are seemingly killed during Infinite Crisis.
Ugly American	Alan Grant; Dan Jurgens	Batman: Shadow of the Bat #6 (November 1992)	**Jon Kennedy Payne** was brainwashed by the U.S. government to be an assassin with extreme patriotic emotions. Something went wrong, however, and he developed a hatred for non-whites and foreigners of all shapes and sizes, including dogs like poodles. His rage came to an end when he was taken out by agents of the same government that created him as Batman subdued him.
Ventriloquist / Ferdie	Gail Simone	Batgirl (vol. 4) #20 (July 2013)	The third Ventriloquist, **Shauna Belzer**, is obsessed with murder. Through the use of telekinesis, Belzer murders innocent people with her "partner", a puppet she controls named Ferdie. Belzer is primarily an enemy of Batgirl.
Wasp	Sheldon Moldoff	Detective Comics #287 (January 1961)	**Willie Blaine** was given the identity of the Wasp as a pawn for two aliens, Kzan and Jhorl, that sought a meteorite.
Wa'arzen	Michael Fleisher; Jim Aparo	The Brave and the Bold #180 (November 1981)	**Wa'arzen** is the vengeful specter of an ancient Japanese wizard.
Werewolf	Len Wein; Neal Adams	Batman #255 (March 1974)	**Anthony Lupus** is a former Olympic decathlon champion who is turned into a werewolf by a drug derived from an Alaskan timber wolf given to him by Professor Milo to treat his unbearable headaches. Milo discovered that his headaches were caused by the lycanthropy and offered him a cure if he would kill Batman. When Batman was trapped, Lupus became a werewolf where Milo was unable to control him and the cure was destroyed. After being impaled by a rod and struck by lightning where he fell to the ground, Anthony's body was nowhere to be found. Six years later, Batman traced Anthony to Alaska, where he planned to bring Anthony back to Gotham City so that his sister Angela can get a bone marrow transplant. Using a silver net, Batman trapped Anthony and took him back to Gotham City, while planning to find a cure for him.
Wrath	Mike W. Barr; Michael Golden	Batman Special #1 (June 1984)	The original character to become the anti-Batman known as the Wrath was a child (name unknown) who watched his criminal parents die at the hands of a then-rookie policeman named James Gordon, who killed them in self-defense. As an adult, Wrath becomes a cop killer who copies many of Batman's methods, except for a readiness to use both lethal force and firearms to accomplish his goals. He is killed in a battle with Batman.
Wrath	Tony Bedard; Rags Morales	Batman Confidential #13 (March 2008)	**Elliot Caldwell** was one of the several orphan children whom the original Wrath kidnapped to train them to become Scorn the Anti-Robin. (Note: The concept of Scorn the Anti-Robin was introduced in an episode of The Batman animated series titled "The End of the Batman", which aired February 9, 2008. The episode re-imagines the Wrath and Scorn as the sons of jewel thieves, who are convicted on the same night Batman's parents are murdered. To avenge the loss of their parents, the Wrath and Scorn become the costumed protectors of other criminals.) Caldwell was the only orphan to survive the training, but was unable to become Scorn due to the Wrath's untimely death. When Caldwell grew into an adult, he became Wrath and devoted himself to the first Wrath's cause. As the C.E.O. of Caldwell Tech, Caldwell began creating an army of soldiers to take on the Scorn identity.
Zebra-Man	Bill Finger; Sheldon Moldoff	Detective Comics #275 (January 1960)	**Jacob Baker** is the original Zebra-Man, who was a high-tech scientist whose body is irradiated, granting him "magnetic" powers to attract or repel metal, wood, stone and human flesh. His name comes from the black and white stripes on his body.
Zebra-Man	Mike W. Barr	Outsiders #21 (1987)	A second Zebra-Man is later created by Kobra as a member of Strike Force Kobra to combat the Outsiders.
Zebra-Man	Paul Jenkins; David Finch	Batman: The Dark Knight (vol. 2) #1 (September 2011)	A version of the Zebra-Man, who goes by the name "**Vortex**", appears in The New 52 as an inmate of Arkham Asylum.
Zeiss	Ed Brubaker; Scott McDaniel	Batman #582 (October 2000)	**Philo Zeiss** possesses surgically enhanced speed, reflexes, vision-enhancing goggles and extensive martial arts training. Brought up by the Sicilian Mafia, Zeiss eventually becomes a contract killer and bodyguard. He fights Batman to a standstill and nearly kills the Catwoman.
Zodiac Master	Dave Wood; Sheldon Moldoff	Detective Comics #323 (January 1964)	The masked villain known as **Zodiac Master** makes his presence known in Gotham by predicting a succession of disasters, all of which he has secretly orchestrated. Having cemented his reputation, he starts offering odds on the relative success or failure for the plans of various criminals, all in exchange for 25% of the take. A mini-figure version of him appears in The Lego Batman Movie.

=== Villains from other rogues galleries ===
When these villains debuted, they fought other heroes before fighting Batman.

Villain	Creators	First appearance	Fictional biography
Calculator	Bob Rozakis; Mike Grell	Detective Comics #463 (September 1976)	**Noah Kuttler** is a highly intelligent criminal who fights Batman and the Justice League wearing a costume designed like a pocket calculator. In spite of his powerful arsenal, the Calculator never makes it big as a costumed villain. Now relying solely on his intellect, he works as a successful information broker and source of information for supervillains planning heists, charging $1,000 per question. He sees Oracle as his nemesis and opposite number.
Count Vertigo	Gerry Conway; Trevor Von Eeden; Vince Colletta	World's Finest Comics #251 (July 1978)	The victim of a hereditary inner ear defect that affected his balance, **Werner Zytle** had a small electronic device implanted in his right temple that compensated for this problem. Tinkering with the device, Zytle learned he was able to distort other people's perceptions, causing vertigo. Donning a costume and taking the name "Count Vertigo", he embarked on a life of crime. Despite primarily being an enemy of the Green Arrow and the Black Canary, he has been known to come into conflict with Batman.
Deathstroke	Marv Wolfman; George Pérez	The New Teen Titans #2 (December 10, 1980)	**Slade Wilson** is a former U.S. Army operative who gains enhanced physical and mental abilities from an experimental super-soldier serum, after losing his right eye in the process; then making his orange and black-sided mask, adopting the mercenary name Deathstroke the Terminator. Widely considered the greatest and deadliest assassin in the DC Universe, he serves as the archenemy of Dick Grayson and the Teen Titans, and is also an adversary of other superheroes such as Batman, Green Arrow, and the Justice League.
Gentleman Ghost	Robert Kanigher; Joe Kubert	Flash Comics #88 (October 1947)	Primarily a Hawkman foe, the specter once named **James Craddock** often finds himself at odds with Batman.
Onomatopoeia	Kevin Smith; Phil Hester	Green Arrow #12 (March 2002)	Onomatopoeia is a serial killer who targets non-powered vigilante superheroes. He earned his name because he imitates noises around him, such as dripping taps, gunshots, etc. No personal characteristics are known about Onomatopoeia, including his real name or facial features. Onomatopoeia is a superb athlete, martial artist, and weapons expert. He carries two semi-automatic handguns, a sniper rifle, and an army knife.
Professor Zoom (Reverse Flash)	John Broome; Carmine Infantino	The Flash #139 (September 1963)	**Eobard Thawne** is a speedster from the 25th century who went insane on discovering he would become a villain. He is behind Flashpoint, where he was killed by Thomas Wayne, but brought back to life, later developing a new grudge over his killer and his family.
Killer Frost	Gerry Conway; Al Milgrom	Firestorm #3 (June 1978)	The first incarnation of Killer Frost, **Crystal Frost** went to Hudson University, where she dated her teacher Martin Stein and worked on a project while living at the Arctic. Unfortunately, she realized her heart was broken when Stein rejected her by withdrawing her from college after realizing her wrongdoing. This causes her to lock herself away in a permafrost chamber by accident but survives transforming her into a cold-superpowered villain. She eventually absorbed heat and turned everything warm living to cold ice adopting the name, Killer Frost.
Killer Frost	Gerry Conway; Al Milgrom	Firestorm (vol. 2) #21 (March 1984)	After the death of Crystal, **Louise Lincoln** became the second incarnation of Killer Frost, in order to avenger her closet friend and take on her first predecessor's legacy. This version of the character has been going against Firestorm and other DC superheroes throughout the years, but she sometimes gets into conflict with the Dark Knight. In Superman/Batman "Public Enemies" arc, she is one of the many supervillains to seek a $1 billion reward from President Lex Luthor by hunting down the Man of Steel and the Caped Crusader. She allied with Mr. Cold, Icicle, and Mr. Freeze, but they were defeated by Batman and Superman in Washington D.C..
King Shark	Karl Kesel; Tom Grummett	Superboy #0 (October 1994)	Born as a humanoid shark in Hawaii with a rare genetic mutation, **Nanaue** killed his victims with his razor-sharp shark-like teeth and claws; including incredible speed, durability, strong senses, and generational healing factors, before he was confronted by Superboy. King Shark has had many duels with Superboy, Aquaman, and various DC Superheroes, but he comes in to confront the Dark Knight on many occasions.
Rag Doll	Gardner Fox; Lou Ferstadt	Flash Comics #36 (December 1942)	**Peter Merkel** is a master contortionist and hypnotist who has fought Batman on many occasions. Since The New 52, he has been an inmate at Arkham Asylum.
Solomon Grundy	Alfred Bester; Paul Reinman	All-American Comics #61 (October 1944)	**Cyrus Gold** was a Gotham City merchant who was murdered and thrown into Slaughter Swamp, where he was transformed into an undead, incredibly strong, zombie-like creature. He was initially an enemy of Green Lantern, but has also had numerous encounters with Batman.

== Teams ==
The following is a list of fictional teams, groups of supervillains, gangs, and organized crime families who are enemies of the Batman family, listed in alphabetical order by name. The first appearance and a brief fictional biography of each team is also listed.

Villain	Creator(s)	First appearance	Fictional biography	Notable members
Academy of Crime	Gerry Conway; Don Newton	Detective Comics #516 (June 1982)	An institution in Hollywood, California, that was created by a thug called Headmaster to educate the low-profile criminals in various crimes.	Headmaster Mirage unnamed students
Batman Revenge Squad	Leo Dorfman; Neal Adams	World's Finest Comics #175 (May 1968)	The Batman Revenge Squad is a trio of villains who don similar costumes to Batman in a bid to destroy him.	Cash Carew Barney the Blast Flamethrower
Black Glove	Grant Morrison; Tony Daniel	Batman #667 (August 2007)	The Black Glove is a corrupt and exclusive organisation led by Simon Hurt that is made up of wealthy and villainous individuals.	Doctor Simon Hurt Jezebel Jet Cardinal Maggi Al-Khidr Sir Anthony General Malenkov Senator Vine
Burnley Town Massive	Greg Rucka; Shawn Martinbrough	Detective Comics #744 (May 2000)	Also known as the B.T.M., they are an African American gang who have made money from drugs, guns, and prostitution.	Able Crown Gary Watson
Cassamento Crime Family	Greg Rucka; Rick Burchett	Batman/Huntress: Cry for Blood #1 (June 2000)	A crime family that specialized in the heroin trade and is one of the Five Families of Gotham City.	Santo Cassamento Mario Cassamento
Circus of Strange	Grant Morrison; Frank Quitely	Batman and Robin #1 (August 2009)	The Circus of Strange is a circus-themed group of criminals led by Professor Pyg.	Professor Pyg Mister Toad Big Top Kushti Phosphorus Rex
Club of Villains	Grant Morrison; Tony Daniel	Batman #676 (June 2008)	The Club of Villains is made up of supervillains led by Doctor Hurt as an evil version to the Club of Heroes.	Doctor Simon Hurt Joker Le Bossu Pierrot Lunaire King Kraken Charlie Caligula El Sombrero Jezebel Jet Scorpiana Swagman
Council of Spiders	Christopher Yost; Marcus To	Red Robin #5 (October 2009)	A group of spider-themed assassins and metahumans who are rivals of the League of Assassins.	Funnel Goliath Recluse Sac Tangle Widower Wanderer Wolf
Court of Owls	Scott Snyder; Greg Capullo	Batman (vol. 2) #2 (December 2011)	The subjects of a popular Gotham City nursery rhyme, the shadowy Court of Owls is a secret society composed of some of the most powerful men and women in Gotham City. They use assassins known as Talons to eliminate threats.	Joseph Powers Maria Powers Lincoln March
Disgraced	Gail Simone; Alitha Martinez	Batgirl (vol. 4) #10 (August 2012)	The Disgraced use whatever means necessary to apprehend, torment, and kill all criminals.	Knightfall Bone Breaker Bleak Michael Katharsis
Dollmaker Family	Tony Daniel	Detective Comics (vol. 2) #1 (November 2011)	The Dollmaker Family is a family of serial killers led by the Dollmaker that run an organ trade business and make dolls out of human flesh.	Dollmaker Dollhouse Bentley Jack-in-the-Box Sampson Olivia Carr Orifice an unnamed character Toyman
East Side Dragons	Paul Dini; Andres Guinaldo	Gotham City Sirens #11 (June 2010)	A gang that is known to run illegal dog fights.	n/a
Escabedo Cartel	Greg Rucka; Shawn Martinbrough	Detective Comics #743 (April 2000)	A Columbian drug cartel that operated in Gotham City's Coventry district.	Diego Escabado Fernando Escabado
Falcone Crime Family	Frank Miller; Dave Mazzucchelli	Batman #404 (March 1987)	The Falcone crime family was an organized crime syndicate that was prominent during the early years of Batman's crime fighting career.	Vincent Falcone Carmine Falcone Alberto Falcone Mario Falcone Sofia Falcone
False Face Society	Bill Finger; Sheldon Moldoff	Batman #152 (December 1962)	The False Face Society is a gang of masked criminals led by Black Mask.	Black Mask Black Spider Circe Metalhead Mad Bull Edgar Dempsy Dwarf
Fearsome Foot-Fighters	John Broome; Sheldon Moldoff	Detective Comics #372 (February 1968)	Experts in a French form of kickboxing, these acrobatic martial artists hail from the fictional Balkan nation of Karonia.	Idimo
Galante Crime Family	Greg Rucka; Rick Burchett	Batman/Huntress: Cry for Blood #1 (June 2000)	A branch of the Sicilian Mafia and one of the Five Families of Gotham City.	Pasquale "Junior" Galante Jr.
Ghost Dragons	Chuck Dixon; Tom Lyle	Robin (vol. 4) #1 (January 1991)	An Asian street gang led by King Snake.	King Snake Lynx
Gorilla Gang	Bill Finger; Sheldon Moldoff	Batman #156 (June 1963)	The Gorilla Gang is a group of criminals who dress up in gorilla suits and commit crimes. In DC Rebirth, the Gorilla Gang members wear gorilla masks and business suits.	Luke Pete Bingo Caesar Joe King Magilla
Hammer Organization	Jim Starlin; Jim Aparo	Batman #417 (March 1988)	A former KGB group that joined the Russian Mafia following the collapse of the Soviet Union.	Commissar KGBeast
Intergang	Jack Kirby	Superman's Pal, Jimmy Olsen (October 1970)	Intergang has a branch in Gotham City and played a part in the "Gotham Underground" storyline.	Johnny Stitches
Inzerillo Crime Family	Greg Rucka; Rick Burchett	Batman/Huntress: Cry for Blood #1 (June 2000)	A crime family that is one of the Five Families of Gotham City.	Enrico Inzerillo Jack Inzerillo
Ivgene Clan	Judd Winick; Guillem March	Catwoman (vol. 4) #1 (November 2011)	A branch of the Russian Mafia.	Ivgene Vadim Renald Ivanko
Kings of the Sun	Francis Manapul; Brian Buccellato	Detective Comics (vol. 2) #30 (June 2014)	The Kings of the Sun are a biker gang that has moved in on Gotham City, led by Holter.	Holter
League of Smiles	John Layman; Jason Fabok	Detective Comics (vol. 2) #16 (March 2013)	The League of Smiles is a cult of criminals that hero-worships the Joker.	Merrymaker Philip Miles Annie McCloud David "Happy" Hill Rodney the Torch
LoBoyz	Bob Gale; Alex Maleev	Batman: No Man's Land #1 (March 1999)	A gang that was active when Gotham City was declared to be a "No Man's Land."	n/a
Leviathan	Grant Morrison; David Finch	Batman: The Return (December 2010)	Leviathan is a shadowy organization with origins unknown, capable of creating surgically and genetically altered super-humans. They have also shown an ability to brainwash people for their cause. The leader of the organization is Talia Head.	Talia Head Heretic Leviathan Son of Pyg
Lucky Hand Triad	Greg Rucka; Shawn Martinbrough	Detective Comics #743 (April 2000)	A triad that is one of the biggest gangs in Gotham City's Chinatown district.	Ekin Tzu
Maroni Crime Family	Jeph Loeb; Tim Sale	Detective Comics #66 (August 1942)	Led by Sal Maroni, the Maroni Crime Family are a prominent crime family in Gotham City. In the early years of Batman's career, the Maronis often vied for power and control of the Gotham City's criminal underworld with the Falcone Crime Family.	Big Lou Maroni Sal Maroni Tony Zucco
Many Arms of Death	Marguerite Bennett; James Tynion IV; Steve Epting	Batwoman Vol. 3 #1 (May 2017)	An assassin group from Coryana that has fought Batwoman. Each of its members are named after a weapon. The Many Arms of Death used a legitimate company called the Kali Corporation as a front. The Scarecrow once worked with the Many Arms of Death under the alias of the Needle. Alice was once brainwashed by the Many Arms of Death to serve them under the alias of the Mother of War.	Knife (Tahani) Alice Elder Fatima Rifle Queen Scarecrow Younger
Masters of Disaster	Mike W. Barr; Jim Aparo	Batman and the Outsiders #9 (April 1984)	The Masters of Disaster are a group of mercenaries with an elemental theme.	New Wave Shakedown Coldsnap Heatstroke Windfall
Mirror House Cult	Scott Snyder; Jock	Detective Comics #871 (November 2010)	A cult led by the Dealer that religiously believes in immorality, the Mirror House Cult gathers at the Mirror House.	Dealer
Misfits	Alan Grant; Tim Sale	Batman: Shadow of the Bat #7 (December 1992)	The Misfits are a group of Batman's enemies led by Killer Moth.	Killer Moth (Drury Walker) Catman Calendar Man Chancer
Mud Pack	Alan Grant; Norm Breyfogle	Detective Comics #604 (September 1989)	The Mud Pack are a group composed of several of the supervillains who call themselves "Clayface". During their alliance, Basil Karlo, the original Clayface, injects blood samples of the other Clayfaces into himself, gaining all of their unique superpowers and abilities and becoming the "Ultimate Clayface".	Basil Karlo Matt Hagen (deceased; represented by a piece of his body) Preston Payne Sondra Fuller
Mutants	Frank Miller	The Dark Knight Returns #1–4 (February–June 1986)	A gang of punks who have taken over the city, the Mutants typically wear visors and have shaved heads or Mohawks. Introduced in The Dark Knight Returns, which took place in a potential future, the Mutants have since appeared in the main continuity.	Mutant Leader Don Rob
Neon Dragon Triad	Grant Morrison; Philip Tan	Batman and Robin #4 (November 2009)	A triad that did business with the Penitente Cartel.	Tony Li
Network	John Francis Moore; Rick Hoberg; Stefano Gaudiano	Batman: Family #1 (December 2002)	The Network is a crime family led by Athena.	Athena Bugg Doctor Excess Freeway Mister Fun Suicide King Technician Tracker
New Olympians	Mike W. Barr; Bill Willingham	Batman and the Outsiders #14 (October 1984)	The New Olympians are Maxie Zeus' group of mercenaries selected to represent Greek and Roman gods to disrupt the 1984 Olympics.	Monitor Antaeus Argus Diana Nox Vulcanus
Odessa Mob	Greg Rucka; Shawn Martinbrough	Detective Comics #742 (March 2000)	A powerful Russian Mafia that has run afoul of Batman and the Green Arrow.	Alexandra Kosov Vasily Kosov Viktor Kosov
Penitente Cartel	Grant Morrison; Philip Tan	Batman and Robin #4 (November 2009)	A Mexican drug cartel founded by a mysterious figure named "El Penitente."	El Penitente
Red Hood Gang	Alan Moore; Brian Bolland	Batman: The Killing Joke (July 1988)	The Red Hood Gang is a gang of Gotham criminals who rotate men under the guise of their leader to help protect the identity of the gang's true leaders if a job goes wrong. The most notable faux leader of the Red Hood Gang was the man who became the Joker.	Joker Joe Jason Todd an unnamed member
Royal Flush Gang	Gardner Fox; Mike Sekowsky	Justice League of America #43 (March 1966)	There have been several incarnations of the Royal Flush Gang. Each gang has consisted of a King, Queen, Jack, Ace and Ten. Over the years, several aristocratic crime gangs existed, where they bring in new members (i.e., sons, daughters, husbands, wives) when the old ones retire or go to jail. At one point, a King was in charge of several members (two of them being his daughter and a Jack) after which Batman broke up the group.	King Queen Jack Ten Ace
Seven Men of Death	Grant Morrison; Tony Daniel	Batman #670 (December, 2007)	The Seven Men of Death is a group belonging to Ra's al Ghul's League of Assassins.	Detonator Hook Maduvu Malcolm Merlyn the Dark Archer Razorburn Shellcase Whip an unnamed member
Spyral	Grant Morrison; Chris Burnham	Batman Incorporated #4 (May 2011)	Spyral is an international spy agency, recently headed up by the enigmatic Doctor Dedalus. Following his death, the agency came under the leadership of his daughter Kathy Kane, the original Batwoman.	Agent 1 Agent 24 Agent 19 Agent 37 Frau Netz Matron Doctor Ashemore
Street Demonz	Alan Grant; Norm Breyfogle	Detective Comics #614 (May 1990)	One of the oldest biker gangs in Gotham City.	Dallas Scorp Swifty The G Titanic
Strike Force Kobra	Mike W. Barr; Jim Aparo	Outsiders #21 (July 1987)	Strike Force Kobra is a group of superpowered operatives created by Kobra based upon some of Batman's rogues in an operation against Stagg Enterprises. Kobra operative Lady Eve would form another incarnation that would menace the Outsiders led by the Eradicator.	Clayface Planet Master Elemental Woman Zebra-Man Spectrumonster Windfall Fauna Faust Dervish Spectra
Terminus' group	Peter Tomasi; Patrick Gleason	Batman and Robin (vol. 2) #10 (August 2012)	Terminus was, by his own account, beaten by Batman at some point in his past and, as a result, he has some rare condition that required painful treatment to extend his life. He vowed to spend the remainder of his life in pursuit of defeating Batman and showing the people of Gotham that Batman is the true villain. He gathers a group of villains who all blame Batman for their current conditions.	Terminus Bathead Bootface Scallop Smush
Terrible Trio	Dave Wood; Sheldon Moldoff	Detective Comics #253 (March 1958)	Warren Lawford, Armand Lydecker, and Gunther Hardwicke are a trio of magnates and scientists who wear masks of cartoon animals to commit crimes as the Fox, the Shark, and the Vulture, respectively, and have obsessions with Earth, Water, and Air.	Warren Lawford Armand Lydecker Gunther Hardwicke Great White Shark
Underworld Olympics	David Vern Reed; José Luis García-López	Batman #272 (February 1976)	The Underworld Olympics is an organization that hosts an international contest of the best criminals in the world separated by South American, North American, European, and Afro-Asian branches to see what region has the most accomplished villains on Earth.	various branches
Victim Syndicate	James Tynion IV; Álvaro Martínez	Detective Comics #943 (October 2016)	The Victim Syndicate is a criminal organization composed of people who have been hurt through Batman's exploits against his rogues gallery. Their goal is to rid Gotham City of Batman and the Bat-family forever.	First Victim Madame Crow Mister Noxious Mudface Mute Anarky
Wonderland Gang	Paul Dini; Dustin Nguyen	Detective Comics #841 (April 2008)	The Wonderland Gang is a gang of supervillains themed around Alice's Adventures in Wonderland and Through the Looking-Glass.	Mad Hatter Tweedledum and Tweedledee March Hare White Rabbit Lion Unicorn Walrus Carpenter

== Mobsters and plainclothes criminals ==
Besides his infamous rogues gallery of supervillains, Batman has also faced more "ordinary" enemies, such as assassins, mobsters and terrorists.

In alphabetical order (with issue and date of first appearance)

Villain	Creator(s)	First appearance	Fictional biography
Able Crown	Greg Rucka; Shawn Martinbrough	Detective Comics #744 (May 2000)	Able Crown is a local thug who has had a few run ins with Batman. Crown is also the same gangster who accidentally starts a huge gang war in Gotham City.
Alfred Stryker	Bill Finger; Bob Kane	Detective Comics #27 (May 1939)	Alfred Stryker is the mastermind behind a chemical syndicate. He was killed in a confrontation with Batman when he fell into a vat of acid early in Batman's vigilante career.
Celia Kazantkakis / Athena	John Francis Moore; Stefano Gaudiano	Detective Comics #775 (December 2002)	Celia Kazantkakis is a former CEO of Wayne Enterprises and current leader of a criminal organization called the Network.
Bad Cop	Andrew Kreisberg; Scott McDaniel	Batman Confidential #22 (December 2008)	Geoff Shancoe is a former police officer who was tortured into insanity by the Joker.
Brainy Walker	Sheldon Moldoff; Charles Paris	Detective Comics #242 (April 1957)	Brainy Walker was paroled after three years for counterfeiting and immediately set out to commit fresh crimes. This time though, he used counterfeit thousand-dollars in bills as a distraction. He first planted the phony bills around Gotham City and broadcast clues to their whereabouts. The streets were choked as citizen sought the money. This kept the police occupied with crowd control and traffic control, allowing W alker to commit robberies in relative peace. Walker then tricked Robin into accidentally telling the location of the Batcave. Batman worked with Alfred Pennyworth to make Walker believed Robin's slip of the tongue was part of a plan to trap Walker and his men. When Walker gave up seeking the secret headquarters, he and his gang were finally apprehended.
Bruno Groft and Lekkey	Bill Finger; Sheldon Moldoff	Batman #128 (December 1959)	Bruno Groft was a foreign agent and assassin-for-hire whose gang kidnapped the Prince, Princess, and Ambassador of Morania. Batman and Robin defeated the gang and prevented Lekkey from assassinating the royal couple.
Carmine Falcone	Frank Miller; Dave Mazzucchelli	Batman #404 (February 1987)	Carmine Falcone, nicknamed "The Roman", is a powerful crime boss in the early years of Batman's career and the leader of the Falcone Crime Family. He is the father of Alberto Falcone, Mario Falcone, and Sofia Falcone.
Catfoot Regan and Beetles Branagan	Bill Finger; Sheldon Moldoff	Batman #134 (September 1960)	Batman and Robin apprehend Catfoot Regan trying to rob jewels from the movement of a huge clock at a clock fair. Clues on Regan's clothes lead them to the thief's boss, Beetles Branagan, operating a crime ring from above the city in a huge advertising balloon.
Ernie Chubb	Chuck Dixon; Beau Smith; Sergio Cariello	Batman/Wildcat #1 (April 1997)	Ernie Chubb is a criminal currently incarcerated at Blackgate Penitentiary.
Erin McKillen	Peter Tomasi; Patrick Gleason	Batman and Robin (vol. 2) #24 (December 2013)	Erin McKillen and her twin sister Shannon were born into the McKillen Crime Family. When they were little, they attended school with Bruce Wayne, who was still in mourning for his parents. Erin was regarded as a feisty child, getting into trouble and stealing kisses from Bruce. Upon the death of her father, she and Shannon took control of the McKillen Crime Family, and while she gained a penchant for ruthlessness, she and her twin sister were eventually arrested and sent to Blackgate Penitentiary. After losing three appeals, their defense attorney Harvey Dent betrayed them by joining the D.A.'s office and personally helping to keep them locked up. When Erin escaped from Blackgate, after her sister sacrificed her life to help Erin, she visited Harvey Dent, murdered his wife and scarred the left side of his face as a reminder of how he had treated them.
Faceless	Doug Moench; Kelley Jones	Batman #542 (May 1997)	Joseph Zedno is a killer who removes the faces of his victims.
Frenchy Blake	Bill Finger; Bob Kane	Detective Comics #28 (June 1939)	Frenchy Blake is a dapper criminal who ran a successful group of jewel thieves.
Gentleman Jim Jansen	Bill Finger; Sheldon Moldoff	Batman #134 (September 1960)	Gentleman Jim Jansen was an orchid fancier and smuggler whom Batman and Robin discover trying to smuggle hot diamonds inside orchids.
Graham	Bill Finger; Sheldon Moldoff	Batman #130 (March 1960)	Graham was an expert builder of replicas of ancient weapons for movies. He begins leading a gang that uses ancient weapons such as ballistas and caltrops to loot banks.
Gregorian Falstaff	Len Wein; Irv Novick	Batman #317 (November 1979)	Gregorian Falstaff is a reclusive billionaire and business rival of Bruce Wayne who time and again tries to put Wayne Enterprises out of business. He once tried to kill Batman with an energy gun, but was pushed by Talia al Ghul into the gunfire, which instantly killed him.
Henri Ducard	Sam Hamm; Denys Cowan	Detective Comics #599 (April 1989)	Henri Ducard was once one of Batman's teachers in the art of crime fighting. Years later, Batman learns that his former mentor is a master criminal. He appears in the three-part miniseries "Blind Justice" in Detective Comics and a few other times later on.
James Gordon Jr.	Frank Miller; Dave Mazzucchelli	Batman #407 (May 1987)	The son of Commissioner Gordon and his ex-wife Barbara Kean, Gordon is a psychopathic serial killer and is primarily an enemy of his sister, Batgirl, and sometimes Dick Grayson.
Joe Chill	Bill Finger; Bob Kane	Detective Comics #33 (November 1939) (Note: Joe Chill first appears in Detective Comics #33, but is not named until Batman #47 (June–July 1948).)	The mugger who murdered Bruce Wayne's parents, inspiring him to become Batman. Different continuities have portrayed him as a small-time criminal, a mob boss or a professional assassin.
Lew Moxon	Bill Finger; Sheldon Moldoff	Detective Comics #235 (September 1956)	Lew Moxon is a mob boss who hired Joe Chill to kill Thomas Wayne, which sparked Bruce Wayne into becoming Batman, as well as bringing the villain Zeiss to Gotham City.
Matt Thorne	Bill Finger; Dick Sprang	Batman #62 (December 1950 – January 1951)	Matt Thorne is an American criminal who brought several fellows felons with him to England to search of hidden Nazi treasure. They were thwarted in there efforts by the United Kingdom protectors, the Knight and the Squire, aided by the Dynamic Duo.
Mr. Lyon	Dick Sprang	Batman #19 (November 1943)	Lyon criminal who frames the Joker for placing people in animal enclosures that echo their names. He claims the Joker sent him a note threatening to place him in a lion cage, and uses this as an excuse to get bodyguards inside a secure area, which he uses to commit a robbery. The Joker hears of his framing, and places Lyon, Batman, and Robin inside a lion cage, but the Dynamic Duo are able to escape with Lyon, who is arrested along with the Joker.
Peter Pan Killer	Scott Snyder; Francesco Francavilla	Detective Comics #875 (March 2011)	Roy M. Blount is a serial killer and pedophile with a Peter Pan motif who kidnaps children in Gotham City.
Rex Calabrese	James Tynion IV; Scott Snyder; Ray Fawkes; John Layman; Tim Seeley; Jason Fabok	Batman Eternal #4 (June 2014)	Rex Calabrese, nicknamed "The Lion", is a gangster who used to run the Mob in Gotham City. His power was so immense that he became known as the Lion. Operating around the mid-20th century, Calabrese believed in something he referred to as the Natural Order. He believed that one day, much like he had done to the previous mob boss, a new up-and-coming gangster would kill him. This self-made prophecy was self-fulfilling, as Calabrese was killed and his empire taken over by Carmine Falcone, though he was not really dead, but imprisoned in Blackgate Penitentiary. He was revealed to be the father of Selina Kyle, though they are estranged.
Ruby Ryder	Bob Haney; Nick Cardy	The Brave and the Bold #95 (May 1971)	The world's richest woman and top female tycoon, based in Gotham City, Ruby Ryder is also a femme fatale and a full-fledged big-time criminal. Three meetings with Batman ended in defeat and prison. She also encounters Metamorpho, the Green Arrow, the Metal Men, and Plastic Man (the latter of whom falls in love with her).
Rupert Thorne	Steve Englehart; Walter Simonson	Detective Comics #469 (May 1977)	Rupert Thorne is a prominent head of the Gotham City Council and one of Gotham City's top smuggling gangs. He is also the boss of Matches Malone, the criminal whose identity was taken over by Batman.
Sal Maroni	Bill Finger; Sheldon Moldoff	Detective Comics #66 (August 1942)	Sal Maroni is the leader of the Maroni Crime Family and the gangster most notable for scarring Harvey Dent.
Sleeper Killer	Doug Moench; Kelley Jones	Batman #516 (March 1995)	A killer who was under the control of her handler, Remmy, who was assassinated by a government agent.
Squid	Gerry Conway; Don Newton	Detective Comics #497 (December 1980)	The Squid (Lawrence Loman, also known as Clement Carp) is a Chinese crime boss in Gotham City. He takes control of the underworld and almost succeeds in defeating Batman before apparently being killed by Killer Croc, a former member of the Squid's gang. However, the Squid returns alive, only to die again as one of the crime bosses killed by Bruno Mannheim.
Sterling Silversmith	Len Wein; Jim Aparo	Detective Comics #446 (April 1975)	Sterling T. Silversmith has been obsessed with silver since childhood and now, as a silver-haired older man, has amassed a fortune in stolen goods. Bullets bounce off Silversmith, thanks to a silver alloy woven into the fabric of his white suit. Batman has fought him twice and once prevented Silversmith from murdering the Crime Doctor with a poison.
Tobias Whale	Jenny Blake Isabella; Trevor Von Eeden	Black Lightning #1 (April 1977)	Primarily the nemesis of Black Lightning, Tobias Whale moved his Metropolis-based operations to Gotham, becoming a figurehead in organized crime after the demise of Black Mask. This accomplishment is short-lived when the likewise Metropolis-based Intergang follows suit and Whale is forced to join their organization.
Tommy "Mangles" Manchester	Doug Moench; Kelley Jones	Batman #519 (1995)	Tommy "Mangles" Manchester was a feared ruffian who haunted the East End of Gotham City. Due to his imposing size—being a tall man with bulging muscles—even most policemen did not dare to mess with him, even though he was responsible for several murders. Eventually, Police Commissioner Gordon arrested him — after a brutal fight mano-a-mano — as his last official act before resigning from his post as Chief of the Gotham City Police Department. During his time in Blackgate Penitentiary, Manchester had a run-in with the Joker, who seriously wounded him (The Joker: Devil's Advocate). After a strong earthquake devastated Gotham City, Manchester teamed up with the cyborg Gearhead, who had lost some of his protheses at the time, strapping the damaged man to his back and, in a way, merging both villains into a hybrid villain. When last seen, Manchester tried to barge into a gathering of members of the Gotham police in an attempt to take some revenge on Gordon.
Tony Zucco	Bill Finger; Bob Kane; Jerry Robinson	Detective Comics #38 (April 1940)	Tony Zucco is a mob boss (or low-level thug, depending on the continuity) who is responsible for the death of Dick Grayson's parents. In most continuities, Zucco tries to extort the circus the Graysons work for. When the ringmaster refuses to pay him, he sabotages the act by causing the high wire ropes to break, which sends Dick's parents falling to their deaths.
Mr. Wylie	Bill Finger; Bob Kane	Detective Comics #42 (August 1940)	Mr. Wylie was a murderer who first appeared in Detective Comics #42- The case of the Prophetic Pictures, the comic he also dies in.

Two of Batman's mobster foes have donned costumes and crossed over to become supervillains:

- Hangman: A mysterious serial killer who murders police officers on every holiday of the year (during the Dark Victory storyline), leaving behind a version of the children's word game "Hangman" (with key letters missing) with each new victim. All of the victims are police officers who, in one way or another, helped Harvey Dent rise to his position of District Attorney. In the end, the Hangman is revealed to be Sofia Falcone, daughter of Carmine Falcone.
- Holiday: A mysterious serial killer who murders mobsters and others over a year (during The Long Halloween storyline). The killer's weapon is a .22 pistol (using a baby bottle nipple as a silencer) with the handle taped and the serial number filed off. Also, every crime takes place on a holiday and a small trinket representing each holiday is left behind at the scene. Alberto Falcone, the youngest son of Carmine Falcone, admits to being the Holiday killer, but then Harvey Dent says there were two Holiday killers. Batman deduces that since he killed Vernon on Halloween with a .22 pistol, he was, in fact, the second Holiday; however, later in a lone monologue Gilda Grace Dent reveals herself as the second (or technically first) Holiday, who was responsible for the first three murders.

== Corrupt cops and government officials ==
In alphabetical order (with issue and date of first appearance)

Villain	Creator(s)	First appearance	Fictional biography
Amanda Waller	John Ostrander; Len Wein; John Byrne	Legends #1 (November 1986)	A powerful government agent and mastermind (having no literal superpowers) who often comes into conflict with Batman and other heroes due to her questionable choices. Her moral ambiguity has put her in a position where she is portrayed in both protagonistic and antagonistic roles.
Arnold Flass	Frank Miller; David Mazzucchelli	Batman #404 (February 1987)	Then-Lieutenant Jim Gordon's partner upon his arrival in Gotham, Arnold Flass is in the pockets of drug dealer Jefferson Skeevers, crime boss Carmine Falcone, and corrupt Commissioner Gillian B. Loeb. He is apparently murdered by the Hangman killer, but previously appeared in a story set years after the Hangman killings.
Howard Branden	Frank Miller; David Mazzucchelli	Batman #405 (March 1987)	Branden was a corrupt S.W.A.T. leader in the early days of Batman's career. He is eventually murdered by the Hangman killer.
Gillian B. Loeb	Frank Miller; David Mazzucchelli	Batman #404 (February 1987)	The Commissioner of Police when Bruce Wayne first returns to Gotham and becomes Batman. He is on the payroll of Carmine Falcone and is later murdered by the Hangman killer.
Commissioner Grogan	Frank Miller; Jordan B. Gorfinkel	Catwoman Annual #2 (1995)	Loeb's replacement as Commissioner during the final part of Bruce Wayne's first year as Batman. Grogan is described by Gordon as being even more crooked than his predecessor.
Commissioner Peter Pauling	Gerry Conway; Irv Novick	Batman #341 (November 1981)	Peter Pauling is a puppet Commissioner installed by Hamilton Hill on the behest of Rupert Thorne, who later kills him.
Harvey Bullock	Doug Moench; Don Newton	Detective Comics #441 (June 1974)	Prior to the 12-issue 1984–85 DC maxiseries Crisis on Infinite Earths, Bullock is a corrupt police detective under instructions from Gotham City's Mayor Hamilton Hill to sabotage Commissioner Gordon's career. His method of doing so is to pretend to be exceedingly clumsy, thereby spoiling whatever Gordon is trying to do, seemingly accidentally. After inadvertently giving Gordon a heart attack, however, Bullock turns over a new leaf and becomes an honest cop.
Jack Forbes	Paul Jenkins; David Finch	Batman: The Dark Knight (vol. 2) #1 (2011)	Member of the Gotham City Police Department's Internal Affairs. He became the new Commissioner after James Gordon's imprisonment and he had secretly allied himself with Carmine Falcone.
Alexander Joseph "Lex" Luthor	Jerry Siegel; Joe Shuster	Action Comics #23 (April 1940)	Though primarily Superman's archenemy, Alexander Joseph "Lex" Luthor attempted to illegally acquire a vast percentage of Gotham's property during the No Man's Land incident, but he was stopped by the efforts of Bruce Wayne and Lucius Fox. Later, when Luthor became President, he framed Bruce Wayne for murder. Eventually, Luthor was revealed as a criminal and deposed from the Presidency by Superman and Batman. Luthor later learned that Bruce Wayne is Batman.
Mayor Armand Krol	Chuck Dixon; Tom Lyle; Scott Hanna	Detective Comics #647 (August 1992)	More incompetent than malicious, Krol had a strong dislike of Commissioner Gordon, demoting and replacing him with his second wife, Sarah Essen Gordon. During Krol's last days in office, Gotham descended into near anarchy after Ra's al Ghul released the "Clench" virus during the Contagion story arc. He died after contracting the virus.
Mayor Daniel Danforth Dickerson III	Greg Rucka; Shawn Martinbrough	Detective Comics #743 (April 2000)	Dickerson is the corrupt Mayor of Gotham beginning after No Man's Land, remaining in office until his assassination by the Joker.
Mayor David Hull	Ed Brubaker; Michael Lark	Gotham Central #13 (January 2004)	David Hull was Deputy Mayor under Dickerson and was his replacement.
Mayor Hamilton Hill	Gerry Conway; Don Newton	Detective Comics #511 (February 1982)	Hamilton Hill is a corrupt politician who became Mayor of Gotham City thanks to Rupert Thorne. He helped Thorne oppose Batman, notably by firing Commissioner James Gordon.
Mayor Sebastian Hady	Tony S. Daniel	Batman #693 (January 2010)	Introduced in Batman as an immensely corrupt and ruthless politician who has publicly admitted to cheating on his wife. He was taken hostage by Azrael (Michael Washington Lane) during the events of "Judgement on Gotham", but was rescued by Red Robin. He also tried to frame Commissioner Gordon for murder during the early days of Batman Incorporated, but Batman easily exposed the allegations as false.

== Antiheroes and reformed supervillains ==
The following is a list of Batman enemies who have reformed and are more often depicted as allies of the masked vigilante than enemies.

Name	Alter ego	First appearance
Catwoman	Selina Kyle	Batman #1 (Spring 1940)
Clayface	Basil Karlo	Detective Comics #40 (June 1940)
Poison Ivy	Pamela Lillian Isley	Batman #181 (June 1966)
Creeper	Jack Ryder	Showcase #73 (April 1968)
Man-Bat	Dr. Robert Kirkland "Kirk" Langstrom	Detective Comics #400 (June 1970)
Bronze Tiger	Benjamin Turner	Richard Dragon, Kung Fu Fighter #1 (May 1975)
Lobo	unpronounceable	Omega Men #3 (June 1983)
Red Hood	Jason Todd	Batman #357 (March 1983, as Robin); Batman: Under the Hood #1 (February 2005, as Red Hood)
Harley Quinn	Dr. Harleen Frances "Harley" Quinzel	The Batman Adventures #12 (September 1993)

== Allies in conflict ==
Some characters generally considered to be allies, yet have come into conflict with Batman.

In alphabetical order (with issue and date of first appearance):

Villain	Creators	First appearance	Fictional biography
Bat-Mite	Bob Kane; Bill Finger	Detective Comics #267 (May 1959)	An imp similar to the Superman villain Mister Mxyzptlk. Appearing as a small childlike man in a Batman costume, Bat-Mite possesses near-infinite magical powers and comes from another dimension. Bat-Mite idolizes Batman, and thus he has visited Batman on various occasions, often setting up strange events so that he could see his hero in action. Bat-Mite is arguably more of a nuisance than an enemy to Batman, and often leaves the hero alone when he realizes that he has angered his idol.
Superman	Jerry Siegel; Joe Shuster	Action Comics #1 (June 1938)	Despite usually being an ally to Batman, on many occasions throughout the decades, Batman has had to battle Superman for various reasons including (but not limited to) idealistic differences, mind control by a supervillain, and even simple misunderstandings.
Wingman	Bob Kane; Bill Finger	Batman #65 (June 1951)	A former butler and student of Batman and a member of the Batmen of All Nations, it was Benedict Rundstrom's jealousy of Batman that drove him to try to kill Batman and the other heroes who made up the Batmen of All Nations.

== In other media ==
=== Antagonists from other media ===
==== Appearing in Batman: The Animated Series ====
- Baby-Doll (appeared in Batman: The Animated Series, originally voiced by Alison La Placa and later by Laraine Newman) - Introduced in her self titled episode, Mary Louise Dahl is a washed-up actress who became bitter and insane after falling into obscurity and suffering from a disorder that prevents her body from growing to adulthood, making her appear to be a child. She had a plan to kidnap her old co-stars from Love That Baby, but was stopped by Batman. She later returned as the partner-in-crime and lover of Killer Croc.
- Ferris Boyle (appeared in Batman: The Animated Series, voiced by Mark Hamill) - Introduced in the episode "Heart of Ice", Boyle is the CEO of GothCorp and directly responsible for the accident to Victor Fries that resulted in his becoming Mr. Freeze. Boyle would later have his legs frozen and nearly be killed by Freeze, until Batman subdued Freeze and exposed his crimes to reporter Summer Gleason, though the manner in which Batman obtained the evidence leaves it unclear if Boyle was sent to prison. Boyle would appear in comics written by the same writer Paul Dini.
  - Ferris Boyle appears in the DLC Cold, Cold Heart for Arkham Origins, voiced by Stephen Tobolowsky.
  - Ferris Boyle appears in Batman: Arkham Shadow, voiced again by Stephen Tobolowsky. He is shown as an inmate of Blackgate Penitentiary, where the Rat Cultists hustle him for protection money.
- Condiment King (appeared in Batman: The Animated Series, voiced by Stuart Pankin) – In his only appearance in the episode "Make 'Em Laugh", he attacks the Crown Restaurant, only to end up fighting Batman. He was identified as Buddy Standler, a former comedian who was brainwashed by the Joker using the Mad Hatter's mind-controlling devices. When Batman defeats the Joker and his plans were exposed, it was assumed that Standler was cleared of all charges. The Condiment King later appeared in the comics as the alias of Mitchell Mayo.
- Roland Daggett (appearing in Batman: The Animated Series, voiced by Ed Asner) – The owner of Daggett Industries, who projects himself as an honest and caring businessman, but is in reality ruthless and despicable, caring only for his image, power and wealth. His first appearance was in the two part "Feat of Clay" episode. Daggett is responsible for the creation of Clayface (Matt Hagen) and uses him to blackmail competitors such as Wayne Enterprises' Lucius Fox. Using Hagen as a would-be assassin after getting him hooked on his miracle face-shaping cream Renuyu, he eventually orders Hagen to be killed with an overdose after Fox escapes. This overdose transforms Hagen into Clayface, who attacks Daggett before being defeated by Batman. Daggett Industries would later appear in the mainstream comics and other media, with Daggett himself being established to exist in Detective Comics Annual #1.
  - A character based on Daggett appears in the film The Dark Knight Rises with the name John Daggett (portrayed by Ben Mendelsohn), plotting Dagget Industries' takeover of Wayne Enterprises as in The Animated Series.
- Emile Dorian (appearing in Batman: The Animated Series, voiced by Joseph Maher) – A revered geneticist who experiments with combining the DNA of humans and animals, most notably felines. He was Kirk Langstrom's tutor, and forced to move to an uninhabited island to continue his research after being protested against for his unethical practices. His creations include Garth, a genetically altered gorilla, and Tygrus, a man-tiger hybrid. Selina Kyle (Catwoman) was chosen as Tygrus' new mate, and subsequently kidnapped by Garth and transformed into an actual cat woman. Batman learns of Selina's transformation and attempts to save her, but Dorian sends Tygrus to kill Batman. When Tygrus learns that Dorian had tricked him, however, he turns on him, destroying the laboratory. Tygrus saves Dorian and delivers him to Batman and Catwoman. Dorian is later sent to Arkham Asylum. Dorian would later resurface in an issue of The Batman Adventures, where a freak accident frees him from his incarceration.
- Ted Dymer (appeared in Batman: The Animated Series, voiced by series developer Bruce Timm) - Featured in the episode Beware the Gray Ghost, Ted Dymer is a toy collector who owns a vintage toy store. Not long after out-of-work actor Simon Trent sells him all of his memorabilia from the now nearly-lost television serial in which he starred, The Gray Ghost, Dymer begins using said memorabilia for criminal purposes, emulating the events of an episode of The Gray Ghost which featured a villain known as the "Mad Bomber". He fits remote-controlled cars with bombs to destroy buildings, while also sending out anonymous demands for ransom money (which he plans to spend on more toys), threatening to bomb more buildings if his demands are not met. Ultimately, Batman allies with Trent to track down Dymer and stop him; when all is said and done, Dymer's store is destroyed in a fiery blaze, leaving him to mourn the loss of all his toys as the police arrive.
- HARDAC (appeared in Batman: The Animated Series, voiced by Jeff Bennett) – HARDAC stands for Holographic Analytical Reciprocating DigitAl Computer. In its first appearance, "Heart of Steel", it was created by Dr. Karl Rossum as a supercomputer to duplicate his late wife and daughter, who died under mysterious circumstances. It later gains a mind of its own, duplicating Gotham's powerful citizens and law enforcement, even learning Batman's secret identity. However, it was destroyed by Batman and Batgirl. In its final appearance, it creates a duplicate of Batman, who ends up fighting the real Batman. Batman fakes his death when the duplicate pushed him off a cliff, causing the duplicate to kill itself as well. Batman begins to wonder if HARDAC was beginning to develop a soul.
- Robert March (appearing in Batman: The Animated Series, voiced by René Auberjonois) - A scientist obsessed with the evolutive potential of bats, and original creator of the serum that turned his son-in-law, Kirk Langstrom into the Man-Bat.
- Red Claw (appeared in Batman: The Animated Series, voiced by Kate Mulgrew) – A ruthless and enigmatic terrorist and leader of an international organization also named the Red Claw. She made her debut in comics in 2021.

==== Appearing in The New Batman Adventures ====
- Roxy Rocket (appeared in The New Batman Adventures, Superman: The Animated Series, and Batman: Chaos in Gotham, voiced by Charity James) – A former stuntwoman who was fired for making her stunts too dangerous, and subsequently turned to crime in search of thrills. She was later incorporated into the comics, beginning in Detective Comics #822 (June 2006).

==== Appearing in The Batman ====
- D.A.V.E. (appeared in The Batman, voiced by Jeff Bennett) – D.A.V.E. (Digitally Advanced Villain Emulator) is an artificial intelligence created by Hugo Strange and programmed to adapt the personalities of Gotham's supervillains. Because of the combination of insane intellects, D.A.V.E. believed himself to be a human criminal whose brain was trapped in a digital prison, which he escaped. He then accessed a technology company computer and created a robotic body for himself, stealing a lab coat from one of the scientists working there. By stealing financial data he was able to determine Batman's secret identity and invaded the Batcave, but was defeated when Batman revealed to him that he was an artificial lifeform.
- Francis Gray (appeared in The Batman, voiced by Dave Foley) – Francis Gray is a villain similar to Green Arrow villain Clock King. In his only appearance, "Seconds", he is presented as a failed clockmaker and thief who was imprisoned for 17 years for accidentally causing major destruction while stealing a pocket watch. On New Year's Eve, he plans to poison Gotham's population as an act of revenge, and accidentally kills his 18-year-old son, Matthew, in the process. Out of grief, he rewound time to all the way before his original crime, preventing it and creating a new present where he and his teenage son are fixing clocks together.
- Kabuki Twins (appeared in The Batman) – The Penguin's silent henchwomen. No origin or alter egos were presented to them, but the Penguin explains he acquired them during a trip to Asia.
- Hideto Katsu (appeared in The Batman, voiced by Keone Young) – A corrupt businessman and leader of a Yakuza family. He is a former victim of Catwoman's robberies. In his only appearance, "The Cat and the Bat", he sets a bounty hunt for Catwoman after she unsuccessfully attempted to steal a valuable item from his possession. After she came back and stole the artifact, Katsu and a group of ninjas called the Dragon's Fang ambushed Catwoman, only for the latter to be saved by Batman. After defeating the Yakuza, Batman discreetly gave a mini disk that was hidden in the artifact to the police that revealed Katsu's connection to the Yakuza.
- Rumor (appeared in The Batman, voiced by Ron Perlman) – Rumor (real name Mario) was a villain that bears similar characteristics to Batman villain Hush. Mario is the bodyguard of a scientist and businessman, Paul Karon, who was disabled by the Joker. To remove his failure, he decides to kill all of Gotham City's costumed criminals. Though he could have been left to the criminals by Batman and Robin, they decided against letting an act of karma take place, getting everyone arrested.
- Temblor (appeared in The Batman, voiced by Jim Cummings) – The first supervillain to face Batgirl, in his only appearance, "Batgirl Begins". Temblor was a corporate saboteur hired by Pamela Isley (shortly before her transformation into Poison Ivy) to destroy a chemical processing plant. He uses specifically designed armored gauntlets to generate shockwaves.

==== Appearing in the films ====
- Carl Grissom (appeared in Batman, portrayed by Jack Palance) – Gotham's top crime boss. and the boss of Jack Napier (who would later become the Joker). While being targeted by district attorney Harvey Dent, Grissom discovers that his mistress Alicia is having an affair with Napier. Upset, Grissom hires corrupt cop Max Eckhardt to have Napier killed at Axis Chemicals as the latter raids the facility to find important documents. However, he fails as Napier is attacked and disfigured by Batman and transforms into the Joker after falling into a vat of chemicals. As revenge for being set up, Joker goes to Grissom's penthouse and kills him.
- Max Shreck (appeared in Batman Returns, portrayed by Christopher Walken) - A corrupt businessman and the owner of the Shreck's department store. He seeks to build a power plant in Gotham City which will secretly drain the city of its energy and store it, giving him complete control of the city. He tries to silence his secretary Selina Kyle when she accidentally discovers this by pushing her out of a window, but she survives and becomes the vigilante Catwoman seeking revenge against him. Shreck then tries to install Oswald Cobblepot as mayor to approve of the power plant but Batman exposes Cobblepot's own corruption. In the film's final confrontation, Shreck is killed by Catwoman who electrocutes him fatally. Shreck later appears in the novel Batman: Resurrection which takes place before Batman Returns and where he seeks to gain more power and influence in the aftermath of the Joker's death, working secretly with Hugo Strange. Shreck appears in the sequel Batman: Revolution.

== Reception ==
The Joker, Batman's archenemy, has been called one of the greatest villains in Batman's rogues gallery, art by Brian Bolland

Batman's rogues gallery has received critical acclaim, cited by many journalists as one of the greatest rogues galleries in all of comic books. Newsarama ranked Batman's villains as the second-greatest comic book rogues gallery of all time, only preceded by that of Spider-Man, stating that "the Dark Knight Detective is one of comics' most enduring, most iconic, and most popular characters, and none of that would be possible without the denizens of Gotham City's dense and dangerous underworld. Batman may be a household name, but the Joker, the Penguin, Mr. Freeze, Catwoman, Two-Face, and the Riddler are just as recognizable."

The internet blog io9 observed that "much of the appeal of Batman is that, unlike other superheroes, he's simply a person who has pushed himself to the edge of his natural limits. The flipside of that, though, is that the villains he faces are also by and large simply people with a single, notable obsession—and that's why they're so much more interesting than the usual set of villains." According to What Culture!, "Batman's villains stand in stark contrast to the other rogues galleries in comics lore; they're an unusual collection of freaks who generally blame the Dark Knight for their existence to begin with. Batman villains are usually cut off from reality, often coming to terms with a deranged part of their psyche—mirroring the darkness and split that also defines the Bat." HitFix praised Batman's rogues gallery, stating that "Great heroes are defined by the villains they face, and no group of evil-doers, murderers, criminals and psychopaths are greater than those stalking Gotham City. From murderous clowns, to cerebral assassins, to brutish monsters, Batman has a literal murderer's row of foes that constantly test his crime fighting acumen."

== See also ==
- List of Batman supporting characters
