= List of criminal organizations in DC Comics =

The following is a list of fictional criminal and terrorist organizations that have been published by DC Comics and their imprints.

== 0–9 ==
=== 2000 Committee ===
A vast criminal organization that planned to take over the world by the year 2000. The 2000 Committee gave Breathtaker the task of killing Firestorm, and he passed the task to Mindboggler. Firestorm defeated both Breathtaker and Mindboggler and handed them over to the authorities. Mindboggler later led Firestorm to the headquarters of the committee. The committee was founded by corrupt industrialist Henry Hewitt, a.k.a. Tokamak, and first appeared in Fury of Firestorm #15. Other operatives of the committee were the Enforcers (Leroy Merkyn and Mica) and Multiplex.

== A ==
=== A'monn A'mokk's offspring ===
When White Martian A'monn A'mokk sought to eliminate Son of Vulcan, he combined his DNA with that he secured from members of the Secret Society of Super Villains. The result was Sapling, Buster, Silhouette, Quaker, and Blur.

=== Academy of Arch-Villains ===
The Academy of Arch-Villains was a gathering of Wonder Woman villains Angle Man, Human Fireworks, and Mouse Man.

=== Academy of Crime ===
The Academy of Crime is a low rent "school for criminals" based in Hollywood, California. First appearing in Detective Comics #515 (June 1982), it is an institute run by a thug called Headmaster who educates his students in the art of various crimes. Mirage is a known graduate of the Academy of Crime. It was shut down by Batman when some of its students ended up in Gotham City.

=== Acolytes of Zoom ===
The Acolytes of Zoom were Speed Force-empowered individuals assembled by Zoom to fight the Flash. They included the Human Block, Folded Man, Magali, the Top, and William Selkirk.

=== Aero-troopers ===
Aerial unit of Apokolips not to be confused with the Parademons.

=== The Agenda ===
The Agenda is an opposing organization in genetics to Project Cadmus that absorbed Darkseid's Evil Factory and is responsible for creating Match. The group appears to have ended with the death of their leader, Lex Luthor's ex-wife Erica Alexandra del Portenza. Their first appearance was in Superboy (vol. 4) #36 (February 1997).

=== A.P.E. ===
Short for Allied Perpetrators of Evil, A.P.E. is a supervillain group in The New Adventures of Superman. First appearing in "The Men from A.P.E.", the line-up consists of Lex Luthor, Toyman, Prankster, and Warlock. In "A.P.E. Strikes Back", Brainiac joins the group.

=== Altered Strain ===
Altered Strain was formed after the Invasion, all its known members carriers of the metagene who manifest no powers. They saw themselves as natural leaders, and wanted the U.S. government to find a way to turn on everyone's metagene. They first appeared in Wonder Woman Annual #3.

=== The Americans ===
Created by Dr. Jacob Krigstein, the Americans were supposed to be an American super hero group but were instead sadistic slaves of their creator. Only five of the dozen or so members have been named. Those are the Commander, Tank-Man, Storm-God, Titan, and Hornet.

=== Amos Fortune's gang ===
Under the guise of Mister Memory, Amos Fortune organized Angle Man, Pied Piper, Hector Hammond, Sea-Thief, Dr. Davis, and a brainwashed Batman to battle the Justice League.

=== Ani-Men ===
When Repli-Tech Industries was going under, CEO Rex Rogan had his top scientist Doctor Lovecraft transform its board into the Ani-Men. Rogan became Maximus Rex, his assistant Reena into a cat-woman, and they were joined by others like Rowl and Gargantus.

=== Anti-Green Lantern Corps ===
An army of artificial beings created by the Weaponers of Qward, the Anti-Green Lantern Corps are equipped with black antimatter power rings which shorten their lifespan with its use.

=== Anti-Justice League ===
The Anti-Justice League is a short-lived villain group assembled by Queen Bee. It consists of Brainiac, Chronos, Clayface, Gorilla Grodd, Harpy, Merlyn, Ocean Master, and Sinestro.

=== Anti-Kryptonian Brigade ===
Formed by Manchester Black, the Anti-Kryptonian Brigade was composed of Master Jailer, Bizarro, Mongul, and Silver Banshee.

=== Anti-Superman Gang ===
Originally founded by "Ace" Manton, the Anti-Superman Gang is a series of groups generally of human beings who sought to eliminate Superman.

=== Anunnaki ===
An offshoot of the Oans, Nergal and his servants Ereskigal, Tiamat, Pazuzu, Humbaba, Enkimdu, and Kulullu enslaved early humans in Mesopotamia before being imprisoned in the dimension Kurnugi.

=== Army of Alfreds ===
A trio of Alfred Pennyworths from across the Dark Multiverse in service of the Dark Knights.

=== Army of Crime ===
Founded by General Scarr, the Army of Crime sought to take over crime in Gotham City. Its members included Colonel Sulphur, Major Disaster, and Captain Cutlass.

=== ASP ===
The Neo-Nazi terrorist organization known as the ASP (short for American Supremacist Party) first appeared in Checkmate #1. The group was responsible for a series of fatal bombings and attempted to release a weaponized biological agent.

=== Assassination Bureau ===
The Assassination Bureau is an organization of metahuman assassins led by Breathtaker, the Bureau was hired by the 2000 Committee to kill Firestorm. Known operatives are Stratos, who can manipulate air; Mindboggler, who possesses telepathy; and Incognito, who possesses shapeshifting abilities. First appears in Fury of Firestorm #29 (November 1984).

=== Atom Rogues ===
A group of the Atom's foes, the Atom Rogues included Bug-Eyed Bandit, Thinker, Panther, Wizardo the Great, Plant Master, and the Man in the Ion Mask who aligned to battle the inheritor of the Atom mantle.

=== The Authoriteens ===
Hailing from a reality where there are no adults, the Authoriteens are that universe's version of the Authority who sought to eliminate Gen¹³. Its membership includes Kid Apollo, Daybreaker, Jack Hatfield, Contractor, Intern, and Nestling.

=== Awesome Threesome ===
The Awesome Threesome are a trio of robots that have antagonized Aquaman. They consist of Claw, Magneto, and Torpedo Man.

==== Awesome Threesome in other media ====
The Awesome Threesome appear in The Superman/Aquaman Hour of Adventure.

=== Axis of Evil ===
Nemeses of the Maximums, the Axis of Evil included Annihilate, Demise, Godiva, and Rapier.

== B ==
=== Bane's Gang ===
Bane and his henchmen Bird, Trogg, and Zombie.

=== Basilisk ===
A cult and terrorist organization led by Regulus.

=== Bat-Knights of Elvaran ===
Initially used as pawns by Eddie Gordon, the Bat-Knights of Elvaran repeatedly returned to antagonize the Atom.

=== The Battalion of Doom ===
The Battalion of Doom kidnapped a variety of influential journalists and businessmen and demanded "the complete surrender of all political, financial, and police power in Gotham". If the demands were not met, the Battalion was prepared to detonate a nuclear device within the city. After infiltrating the terrorists as a West Coast enforcer, Superman joined Batman in rescuing the hostages and locating the bomb. The members of the Battalion wore military browns with magenta hoods over their heads. First and only appearance is in The Brave and the Bold #150.

=== Bikini Family ===
A troupe of evil circus performers, the Bikini Family consists of mesmerist Nicki, strong man Joe, clown Tiny, acrobats Peter, Paul, and Manny, and a trio of high wire walkers.

=== Bizarro Boys ===
Bizarro version of the Super-Sons with Boyzarro and Robzarro.

=== Bizarro Insiders ===
Bizarro version of the Outsiders led by Bizarro Batman.

=== Black and Whites ===
Trio of the Penguin, Great White Shark, and Black Mask.

=== Black Circle ===
An intergalactic criminal organization that was headed up by Amon Sur and counted Kerina, Farak Fekk, and Commander Levvak among their number.

=== Black Glove ===
The Black Glove organization is a group that was active following the deaths of Thomas Wayne and Martha Wayne. It is led by Simon Hurt and consists of various rich men and women of villainous natures.

==== Black Glove in other media ====
- Several members of the Black Glove appear in the "What If" Batman: The Brave and the Bold episode "The Knights of Tomorrow!".
- The Black Glove appears in Batwoman, consisting of Barbara Kean, Burton Crowne, Jeremiah Arkham, Mario Falcone, and Maria Elliot, the mother of Tommy Elliot.

=== Black Hole ===
Black Hole is a terrorist organization that has plans to harness the powers of the Speed Force for their own purposes. While Gorilla Grodd was a former leader, other known members include Dr. Holt, Dr. Huskk, Joseph Carver, Multiplex, and Raijin, with a brainwashed Meena Dhawan operating as Negative Flash.

==== Black Hole in other media ====
Black Hole appears in The Flash. This version was created and led by McCulloch Technologies' CEO Joseph Carver, who also employed light-themed assassins Ultraviolet, Doctor Light, and Sunshine. Introduced in season six, their operations are threatened by the Flash and his allies as well as Carver's presumed dead wife Eva McCulloch. By the end of the season, Eva destroys their information storehouse, sways the assassins to her side, and kills Carver. As of season seven, Rosalind Dillon and Sam Scudder had joined Black Hole until Eva kills Scudder and sways Dillon to her side while hunting down the organization's remnants.

=== Black Manta's pirates ===
The pirate crew of Black Manta that serve aboard the Manta-Sub. Cal Durham was once one of his crew members.

=== Black Ops ===
Black Ops was a criminal organization devoted to accumulating power with sophisticated headquarters in both Metropolis and Washington, D.C. Its leader was Hazard, otherwise known as philanthropist Manuel Cabral, head of Rainforest Technologies (and secretly affiliated with weapons manufacturer AmerTek). His costumed operatives included his female second-in-command Shellshock, Flatline, Hardsell, Hotspot, Mainline, Quake, Shellgame, and Split. The techno-pirates had frequent clashes with Steel, who ultimately prevented them from seizing control of the United States' nuclear arsenal. The team first appears in Steel #6.

=== Black Strong Family ===
Evil counterparts to the Strong Family, the Black Strong Family consist of Tiberius "Black Tom" Strong and his daughter Twyla.

=== Blockbuster's Gang ===
Blockbuster's Gang first appears in Nightwing (vol. 2) #2. This gang was one of the most powerful mobs in Blüdhaven, made up of corrupt police officers and supervillains. The organization leader is Roland Desmond.

=== Bomb Squad ===
Alliance of Electrocutioner and Plastique.

=== Boss Glitter's gang ===
The crime boss of Delta City, Boss Glitter commands the likes of El Gusano, Rachet Jaw, and Kriegler.

=== The Brethren ===
Created to eliminate Team 7 if necessary, the Brethren escaped and became a menace. Its members included Jackhammer, Double Take, Tensile, and Animus.

=== Brood Brothers ===
The Brood Brothers are the strongest members of the beast-men of Skartaris who serve directly under Ar-Daimphos.

=== Brotherhood of Crime ===
Formed by Darkseid to conquer Earth, the Brotherhood of Crime was made up of Captain Cold, Gorilla Grodd, Clayface, Star Sapphire, and a clone of the Manhunter. However, when the group realized Darkseid would likely double-cross them, they betrayed him first. The story featuring this team was revamped into becoming the Secret Society of Super Villains but was nonetheless published as a standalone story in Amazing World of DC Comics #11 (March 1976).

=== Brotherhood of the Monkey Fist ===
A cult dedicated to the martial arts, the Brotherhood of the Monkey Fist included Silver Monkey, Bamboo Monkey, and Paper Monkey.

=== Brute and Glob ===
Nightmares created by Morpheus, Brute and Glob sought to manipulate Garrett Sanford to have a Dream Lord under their control.

=== Bulletthug and Bulletmoll ===
When criminals get ahold of Bulletman and Bulletgirl's gravity helmets, they form the criminal duo Bulletthug and Bulletmoll.

== C ==
=== C.A.W. (Criminal Alliance of the World) ===
C.A.W. (short for "Criminal Alliance of the World") specialized in archaeological forensics used for the retrieval of lost ancient technology. This brought them into conflict with Katar Hol and Shayera Hol, when the attempted to steal an artifact from the Midway City Museum. The paired artifacts they were attempting to steal were analyzed and led to the development of the Justice League of America's teleportation system which first appears in Justice League of America #78. The organization is ruled by an international triad of masked crime bosses; C.A.W. agents wear matching red and black costumes with a golden, razor-edged C.A.W. emblem on their chests that doubled as a weapon.

=== C.A.W. (Crusading American Warriors) ===
A second organization calling itself C.A.W. (Crusading American Warriors) was encountered by Hawkgirl (Kendra Saunders) in JSA: All-Stars #2.

=== The Cabal ===
Founded by Helspont, the first Cabal is an organization established to further the alien race known as the Daemonites in their bid toward world domination. It counted among its membership Devin, Pike, Providence, Alberto Cassini, Hightower, and Taboo with the Coda Sisterhood as a collaborator.

The second Cabal was founded by Hugo Strange and consisted of Amazo, Doctor Psycho, Per Degaton, Queen Bee, and Teel.

==== The Cabal in other media ====
The first Cabal appears in Wild C.A.T.s.

=== Cannon and Saber ===
A pair of highly trained assassins and lovers.

=== Cape and Cowl Crooks ===
When James Gordon and Perry White come together to research the past cases of Batman and Superman at the Fortress of Solitude, a strange gas warped the minds of the pair into enemies of the heroic duo. Using some of the tools within, Gordon and White became Anti-Batman and Anti-Superman respectively as the Cape and Cowl Crooks.

=== Capers, Inc. ===
A trio of psionic criminals, Capers, Inc. is composed of Run, Burn, and Jump.

=== Cell Six ===
Cell Six was "the most notorious terrorist organization in Latin America", one responsible for the abduction of Wayne Enterprises' Lucius Fox while he was in the country of Hasaragua. They demanded $3 million in ransom, and a letter of apology from Wayne Enterprises for despoiling Hasaragua's environment and the exploitation of its people.

The kidnapping was eventually exposed as a collaboration between Hasaragua's finance minister and Cell Six. In Gotham City, Cell Six also staged a kidnapping attempt against the wife of a Hasaraguan ambassador. Cell Six troops could be visually distinguished by the Roman numeral "VI" (for 6) tattooed on their foreheads.

=== Children of Cronus ===
The Children of Cronus are a group of Titans that were responsible for empowering Devastation.

=== Children of Kaizen Gamorra ===
Clones made from the DNA of Kaizen Gamorra's family.

=== Children of Light ===
The Children of Light was a middle-eastern costumed terrorist group originally led by Kahman Abhood. Following Abhood's arrest, the group seized control of a S.T.A.R. Labs/Waynetech satellite, equipped it with a laser cannon, and threatened to destroy cities at will if their demands were not met. Batman and Supergirl defeated the group and discovered that they'd allied themselves with Doctor Light. They first appeared in The Brave and the Bold #147.

=== China White Triad ===
The trio of China White with Snakepit and Strato the Cloud-Man.

=== Church of Blood ===
The Church of Blood is an organization led by Brother Blood. Two female members of the group have gone by the name of Mother Mayhem.

==== Church of Blood in other media ====
- The Church of Blood appears in Arrow, formed by Roger Trigon and with Sebastian Blood as a prominent member. After Blood's death, his second-in-command Clinton Hogue takes over the remains of the group until his own death.
- The Church of Blood appears in season four of Titans, led by May Bennett/Mother Mayhem.

=== The Circle ===
The first Circle believed they were the first creation of God and that Superman might be one of their number.

The second was a group of Amazons led by Alkyone who believed the creation of Wonder Woman was an affront to their society and tried to assassinate her. Its members included Charis, Myrto, and Philomela.

=== Circle of Six ===
Six martial artists under the command of Lady Shiva, the Circle of Six were Hwa Rang, Iron Aron Abromowitz, Joey N'Bobo, Kitty Kumbata, Tengu, and Wam Wam.

=== Clockwatchers ===
Proclaimed to be the "Future of Villainy," the Clockwatchers were brought together by Clock King and included Acidia, Crackle, Radiant, and Sharpe.

=== Coalition of Crime ===
Composed of Vulcan's greatest foes, the Coalition of Crime included Witchazel, Charliehorse, Dino-Mite, Fishmonger, Flex, Little B.U.D.D.Y., Monkey-in-the-Middle, and Scramjet.

=== Coda Sisterhood ===
Founded in ancient Greece by a band of the Kherubim alien race, the Coda Sisterhood is a female warrior society. In modern times, the Coda largely aligned with the malevolent nemeses of the Kherubim in the Daemonites.

=== Cold Warriors ===
Formed by Polar Lord, the Cold Warriors was composed of Snowman, Mr. Freeze, Cryonic Man, Minister Blizzard, Captain Cold, Killer Frost, and Icicle as his pawns toward conquering Earth for his homeworld Tharr. This group was created for the series Justice League Adventures, based in the continuity of the DC Animated Universe.

=== Collective ===
An organization that runs Gotham in a future without a Batman. Run by Gala, the Collective includes Pretty, Victor Paige, and Mr. Freeze.

=== Colossus ===
Colossus was a mysterious organization that sought the secret of Alec Holland's bio-restorative formula to create an army of swamp men similar to the Swamp Thing. The organization was led by a mysterious council, each member of which wore a uniquely colored costume (Councilman Red, Councilman Blue). Colossus had the ability to mutate humans into monstrous agents known as "Elementals". Only one Elemental by the name of Thrudvang the Earth Master was ever actually depicted; he was a skid row bum who transformed into a hulking yellow monster with the "ability to disrupt the earth". Colossus' chief enforcer was Sabre, a red and blue costumed figure with a long thin blade replacing his right hand. They first appeared in Swamp Thing #23.

=== Combine ===
The first Combine is an evil shadow organization who inadvertently created the superhero Haywire when it unknowingly gave its leader's son an experimental suit of technological armor.

The second Combine is an intergalactic arms dealer who encountered the Flash and Darkstars.

=== Conclave ===
A crime cartel led by Mister E, the Conclave was responsible for the creation of Swamp Thing.

=== The Confederation of Hell ===
In a bid to eliminate the Marvel Family and Kid Eternity, Satan assembled Ibac, Sabbac, Master Man, and Darkling as the Confederation of Hell.

=== Cosmic Anti-Superman Gang ===
An alliance made under Brainiac of Cosmic King, Lightning Lord, Saturn Queen, and Lex Luthor to manipulate Jimmy Olsen into killing Superman.

=== The Council ===
The first Council was an international secret society, which was responsible for the cloning of Paul Kirk (Manhunter) and was eventually brought down by him and his allies Asano Nitobe, Christine St. Clair, and Kolu Mbeya.

Under the leadership of Anatol Mykros they rebuilt themselves up again, to the point where their machinations brought them to the attention of various members of the Justice Society of America. Nemesis (Soseh Mykros), the daughter of Council leader Anatol Mykros, rebelled against them, enlisting the help of the JSA. It was eventually destroyed when Black Adam killed Anatol Mykros in order to have Nemesis join his pro-active super-team. The Council first appeared in Detective Comics #437 (February 1974).

==== The Council in other media ====
The first Council appears in Beware the Batman.

=== Council of Merlin ===
Descendants of Merlin who sought the power of Shazam for themselves.

=== Council of Spiders ===
The Council of Spiders is a cadre of metahuman killers-for-hire led by the mutant super-villainess known only as the Wanderer. When they debuted in Red Robin, they were hunting members of Ra's al Ghul's League of Assassins.

=== Crime Champions ===
An alliance between Earth-Two's Wizard, Icicle, and Fiddler aligned with Earth-One's Felix Faust, Doctor Alchemy, and Chronos, the Crime Champions exchanged identities in order to defeat the Justice Society of America and the Justice League of America.

=== Crime Corps ===
The nemeses of the Paladins, Crime Corps included Hotfoot, Stinkbug, Taipan, Tinderbox, and the Skeleton Crew.

=== Crime Lodge ===
The evil Justice Society equivalent in the Antimatter Universe.

=== Cult of Ashra Khan ===
The Cult of Ashra Khan was based out of Pakistan that created an army of rogue Firestorms/Nuclear Men.

=== Cult of Barbathos ===
A Cult in the worship of the bat demon Barbatos, its membership included founding father Thomas Jefferson. Later, it was revealed Barbathos (now Barbatos) was the Hyper-Adapter, a product of Apokolips, and Thomas Wayne was part of the cult. After making a pact with Barbatos, Wayne became Dr. Simon Hurt.

=== Cult of the Bat ===
Founded by Jason Todd (Lord Robin) in a future Gotham without a Batman, the Cult of the Bat includes the Joker and Holly Robinson.

=== Cult of the Blood Red Moon ===
Vampire coven of Mary, Queen of Blood.

=== Cult of the Unwritten Book ===
First appearing in Doom Patrol #31, the Cult of the Unwritten Book is a religious order that is dedicated to the annihilation of the universe by summoning an entity called the Decreator.

==== Cult of the Unwritten Book in other media ====
The Cult of the Unwritten Book appears in Doom Patrol.

=== CYCLOPS ===
The group of international jewel thieves known as CYCLOPS, first appeared in The Brave and the Bold #64. Known operatives are Marcia Monroe, the second Queen Bee.

== D ==
=== D.M.T. ===
The D.M.T. were an international weapons coalition who came into possession of an extraterrestrial craft and its pilot following the events of the Invasion. Their field agents wore gold armor that was equipped with weapons and flight packs. The D.M.T. first appeared in Superman #48.

=== D'rahn ===
An ancient alien species, the D'rahn are a warrior race that seek to eliminate the Kherubim and conquer Earth. The operatives on Earth are Typhon, Pildra, Syth, and Zenthrue.

=== Damnation Army ===
Servants of the demon Nergal, the Damnation Army included Ironfist the Avenger and the Man.

=== Dark Arcana ===
After Morgaine le Fey and Enigma supplanted the role of Wonder Woman and Batman, respectively, they formed an organization around the major arcana of Tarot. Its members included Giganta, Zoom, Vandal Savage, Brainiac, Lady Shiva, Konvikt, Solomon Grundy, Deathstroke, Floronic Man, Ra's al Ghul, Doctor Light, Sun-Chained-in-ink, Punch and Jewelee, Joker, Catman, Catwoman, Royal Flush Gang, Gentleman Ghost, Scarecrow, Cheetah, Gorilla Grodd, Queen Bee, Eclipso, Mammoth, and Khyber.

=== Darklight ===
Twins who worked for Two-Face.

=== Deadly Duo ===
The team of Lex Luthor and Brainiac.

=== Death Row ===
A team of assassins made up of Guillotine, Hangman, Hypo, Smoke, and Volt.

=== Deathstroke's Titans ===
A band of mercenaries, Deathstroke's Titans included Cheshire, Cinder, Osiris, and Tattooed Man.

=== Defense Department Intelligence ===
The Defense Department Intelligence (DDI) was the military arm of the United States Justice Department who hunted Swamp Thing. Dwight Wicker was its director during this time and Matthew Cable one of its top operatives.

=== DEMON ===
DEMON is a terrorist organization, dedicated to "Destruction, Extortion, Murder, Overthrow of Nations", based in the Near Eastern country of Sinsubhani. It was broken up by Superman in Superman #191 (November 1966).

=== Demon's Fist ===
A unit in the League of Assassins led by Ra's al Ghul's granddaughter Mara that includes Plague, Stone, Blank, and Nightstorm.

=== Demons Three's phantoms ===
When the Demons Three sought to possess the members of the Justice League, they sent a troupe of animated costumes of some of their greatest foes. This group included the costumes of Doctor Polaris, Killer Moth, Pied Piper, Dagon, and the Mask.

=== Destiny's Hand Justice League ===
A cruel and authoritarian version of the Justice League, manifested by Doctor Destiny in a collective dream world during the "Destiny's Hand" storyline.

=== Deuce and Charger ===
A pair of villains who faced Superman, Deuce and Charger later joined the Fearsome Five.

=== Die Faust Der Kain ===
"The Fist of Cain," Die Faust Der Kain is a cult of killers who follow the teachings of Christian Fleischer. Its members included Adam Reed, Rose Tattoo, Blockbuster, and Dirty Girl.

=== The Directorate ===
A faction in the Aegean civil war, the Directorate included Darian and his son Regent.

=== Doctor Destiny's gang ===
Several early incarnations of Doctor Destiny saw the villain organize the Justice League of America's villains against them. The first version featured Professor Menace, Captain Cold, Puppet Master, Electric Man, Getaway Mastermind, and Clock King. His second group was a trio with the Joker and Chac. Later still, he aligned with Lex Luthor, Penguin, Captain Boomerang, Tattooed Man, Cutlass Charlie, Jason Woodrue, Mr. I.Q., and Doctor Light.

=== Doctor Dome's gang ===
Doctor Dome and his underlings Lynx and Professor X.

=== Doctor Impossible's New Gods ===
Seemingly an evil counterpart to Mister Miracle, Doctor Impossible lead his own evil version of the New Gods of New Genesis. Among its number included evil counterparts to Big Barda, Metron, Orion, and Lightray in Tender Mercy, chair, Hunter, and Neon Black, respectively.

=== Doctor Polaris' gang ===
Doctor Polaris and his henchmen Whiteout, Dropded, and Polestar (Doctor Ub'x).

=== Dog Cavalry ===
Steppenwolf's mounted unit on Apokolips.

=== Dog Pound ===
Originally the Global Ultra-society of Dread, the Dog Pound is a group of canine-themed villains that includes Anubis, Devil Dog, and Junkyard Dog.

=== Dreadfuls ===
The Dreadfuls are the evil counterparts of the Terrifics. Led by Java, they consist of characters that he gathered from across the Multiverse, including Metalmorpho (a robot counterpart of Metamorpho), Phantom Boy (a male counterpart of Phantom Girl), and Plasma-Man (a vampire version of Plastic Man).

=== Dreambound ===
Assembled by Morgaine le Fey and Enigma to help them supplant the Trinity, the Dreambound included Sun-Chained-In-Ink, Primat, Swashbuckler, and Trans-Volitional Man (T.V.M.). Sun-Chained-In-Ink later became Sun-Chained-In-The-Dark in the Dark Arcana.

== E ==
=== Eden Corps ===
Outwardly an above-board West Coast organization, the Eden Corps soon established itself as a radical terrorist cell dedicated to taking on "corporate America and its ravagers". Led by Hyrax (Veronica Dale), the Eden Corps committed terrorist-styled crimes, like bombing dams on its way to a bigger goal, unleashing a Russian-created weaponized germ that ate plastic. Before the Eden Corps could unleash the germ on Metropolis, Green Arrow intervened. Hyrax died in the battle and Green Arrow followed soon after. They first appeared in Green Arrow (vol. 2) #97.

==== Eden Corps in other media ====
Eden Corps appears in series set in the Arrowverse.

=== Effigy Corps ===
The Controllers' attempted equivalent of the Green Lantern Corps based on their creation Effigy.

=== Emerald Knights ===
The Earth-3 evil equivalent of the Green Lantern Corps.

=== Emissaries of Doom ===
A quartet of Darkseid's followers, the Emissaries of Doom empowered Lex Luthor, Brainiac, Joker, and the Penguin.

=== Emissaries of Varn ===
One of the most terrifying forces in Gemworld, the Emissaries of Varn formed an alliance with Dark Opal to battle Princess Amethyst's forces.

=== Empire of Death ===
The Empire of Death was a terrorist group formed by a former Nazi SS colonel named Von Gross. Its agents wore skull masks, possessed a fleet of aircraft, and operated from a giant solar-powered flying skull. With "trained agents in every corner of the globe", the Empire of Death engaged in espionage and contract assassination with an eye towards world domination. Von Gross was eventually slain by Blackhawk but the Empire of Death remained a going concern through its operatives. The commander of the Empire of Death's undersea forces was Killer Shark, who retooled the War Wheel into an amphibious weapon of destruction. They first appeared in Blackhawk #249.

=== Eurocrime ===
Eurocrime is a European metahuman criminal organization that fought Elongated Man and Justice League Europe. First appears in Elongated Man #1 (January 1992).

=== Evil Eight ===
Created by the Master, the Evil Eight battled the wielders of the Dial H for Hero in Chris King and Vicki Grant. Its membership was Arsenal, Chondak, Familiar, Ice King, K-9, Maniak, Phantasm, and Piledriver.

=== Evil Factory ===
Established by Darkseid as an opposing entity to Project Cadmus, the Evil Factory was headed by Mokkari and Simyan, who spawned monsters for their master.

=== Evil One's cult ===
The cult of Craetur the Evil One, a powerful demonic being in Skartaris.

=== Evil Three ===
Three brothers who tried to rule Krypton in U-Ban, Kizo, and Mala.

=== Expediters, Inc. ===
A group of mercenaries made up of Pointman, Glacier, Flame, Mountain, and the Dark.

=== Extreme Enhancement Module subjects ===
The recipient of Extreme Enhancement Modules by aliens, Nunzio, Nancy, Carlos, Moe, Bridget, and Reggie chose to become a group of supervillains.

=== Extremists ===
The Extremists are a group of supervillains that came from the other-dimensional world of Angor. They are all modeled after characters from Marvel Comics.

The first incarnation consists of Lord Havok (modeled after Doctor Doom), Dreamslayer (modeled after Dormammu), Gorgon (modeled after Doctor Octopus), Tracer (modeled after Sabretooth), Doctor Diehard (modeled after Magneto), Carny (modeled after Arcade), and Barracuda (modeled after Tiger Shark).

Dreamslayer was contracted by Overmaster to form a variation of the Extremists called the New Extremists which consist of Brute, Cloudburst, Death Angel, Gunshot, and Meanstreak.

==== Extremists in other media ====
The original Extremists appear in the Justice League Unlimited episode "Shadow of the Hawk".

== F ==
=== F.E.A.R. ===
A terrorist organization that fought Birdman, F.E.A.R. was led by Number One and counted among its forces Vulturo, X the Eliminator, Ruthless Ringmaster, Nitron the Human Bomb, and Professor Nightshade. In the series Future Quest, Dr. Zin secretly controlled the organization through mind control as mercenary Jezebel Jade participated as a member.

=== Fadeaway Man's gang ===
Composed of Hawkman's enemies, Fadeaway Man's gang included Lion-Mane, Hummingbird, and Lasso.

=== False Face Society ===
The False Face Society (also known as the False Facers and the Sionis Crime Family) is a gang of masked criminals led by Black Mask (Roman Sionis). Its known members include Black Spider, Circe, Dwarf, Edgar Dempsey, Mad Bull, and Metalhead. Each of its members are known for wearing masks.

In The New 52 continuity reboot, the False Face Society was formed by Roman Sionis's father Richard.

==== False Face Society in other media ====
===== Television =====
- The False Face Society appears in the Batman: The Brave and the Bold episode "Plague of the Prototypes!", with Black Mask and Taboo as prominent members.
- The False Face Society appears in the second season of Batwoman. This version of the group wear a variety of different masks and distribute a drug called "Snakebite". Additionally, three of their members work as double agents in the Gotham City Police Department.

===== Film =====
The False Face Society appears in Birds of Prey.

===== Video games =====
- The False Face Society appears in Batman: Dark Tomorrow.
- The False Face Society appears in Lego Batman: Legacy of the Dark Knight.

===== Miscellaneous =====
- The False Face Society appears in the Batman Adventures tie-in comics.
- The False Face Society appears in Injustice 2.

=== Fearsmiths ===
Successors of Crime Corps, the Fearsmiths includes Stinkbug, Taipan, Tinderbox, Skeleton Crew, Nightmary, and Third Rail.

=== Five Fingers of the Hand ===
Assembled by the Hand, the Five Fingers were Red Dragon, Professor Merlin, Big Caesar, Needle, and the Dummy and faced the Seven Soldiers of Victory. The group was re-assembled (minus the Dummy) due to the emergence of the Nebula Man as the Hand became the Iron Hand.

=== Five Inversions ===
When the Manhunters ravaged space sector 666, the five survivors aligned as the Five Inversions to seek revenge on the Guardians of the Universe and founded the Empire of Tears. The members were Atrocitus, Qull, Roxeaume, Dal-xauix, and Orphram.

=== Flamesplasher ===
Twins who worked for Two-Face.

=== Forgotten Villains ===
Organized by the Enchantress, the Forgotten Villains sought to conquer the universe. Its members included Mister Poseidon, Faceless Hunter, Atom-Master, Kraklow, and Ultivac.

=== Four Horsemen of Apokolips ===
Foretold in the Crime Bible, the Four Horsemen of Apokolips were bio-engineered by the Science Squad. They included Yurrd the Unknown, Rogga of the Seven Atrocities, Zorrm the Desolate, and Azraeuz the Silent King.

=== Four Mopeds of the Apocalypse ===
Assistants to the biblical Four Horsemen of Apokolips, the Four Mopeds of the Apocalypse are stationed on Earth where they observe for signs of the end of days. The group is made up of Skippy, Famine Lass, Plague Boy, and Kid Pestilence.

=== Fourth Reich ===
A Neo-Nazi organization founded by Vandal Savage to wipe out the descendants of US patriotic heroes, the Fourth Reich included Captain Nazi, Baroness Blitzkrieg, White Dragon, Hunter, Shadow of War, Green Ghoul, Count Berlin, Captain Swastika, Doctor Demon, Baron Gestapo, Captain Murder, Reichsmark, and Swastika.

=== FAN ===
Formed by Doctor Dinosaur on Earth-Twelve, the Fraternity of Atavistic No-Goodnicks (or FAN) was made up of Angel Fish, Frog Man, Mister Amoeba, and Pterano Don Juan to combat the Egg's Men.

=== The Freaks ===
Led by Trance, the Freaks included Baby-Doll, Siren, Phobia, and the Albino.

=== Front Men ===
Led by Mister Somebody, the Front Men included Animal-Vegetable-Mineral Man, Botfly, and Porcelain Doll.

=== Futuresmiths ===
The Futuresmiths are a mysterious group of criminal scientists and high tech arms dealers who have an underground operation in Metropolis. Known operatives are Amok and Cir-El. They first appear in Superman: The 10-Cent Adventure #1 (March 2003). The group was later revealed to have been a front for Brainiac.

== G ==
=== The Gang ===
The first Gang was a quartet of impoverished children growing up in Chicago who grew up to become a mercenary band. Led by Brains, Ms. Mesmer, Kong, and Bulldozer went on to work for the Council and fought Supergirl.

Later, children who idolized supervillains followed in their footsteps as the second Gang. Led by Rex Luthor, they included Brainiac 6, Ice Princess, Kid Deadshot, and Shaggy Boy.

=== Gangland Guardians ===
When the West Coast Crime Syndicate invaded Gotham City to eliminate Batman and take over the city's crime, the Penguin assembled the Joker, Catwoman, Mad Hatter, Cluemaster, Getaway Genius, and Johnny Witts as the Gangland Guardians to combat them unknowingly under the influence of Mister Esper. When the Guardians managed to protect Batman from the threat, they dissolved to return to their own efforts to eliminate Batman.

=== Garn Daanuth's elementals ===
Garn Daanuth transformed three unwitting people into his elementals Earth, Water, and Air.

=== Gemini ===
A pair of lovers, Santiago and Belladonna became the villainous Gemini.

=== General Zod's gang ===
After conquering Pokolistan, General Zod recruited Ignition, Kancer, and Faora as his followers.

=== Golden Glider and Chillblaine ===
Using one of her brother's cold guns, Golden Glider formed a number of partnerships with male criminals over time with them adopting the identity of Chillblaine. Eventually, one of them killed her.

=== The Grey ===
The Green's fungal equivalent, the Grey is an opposite force of nature that thrived on decay. Its avatar Matango became a foe of the Green's elemental Swamp Thing. Later, other champions emerged in Solomon Grundy and Miki.

=== Guano Cravat's gang ===
An arms dealer, Guano Cravat employed the likes of the Swiss and Doctor Moon for his operation.

=== Gunhawk and Gunbunny ===
A pair of lovers and highly trained assassins.

== H ==
=== Hand of Krona ===
The Hand of Krona is an interstellar technology cult.

=== Hangmen ===
The Hangmen is a group of high-powered assassins. It consists of Breathtaker, Killshot, Provoke, Stranglehold, and Shock Trauma.

=== Harassers ===
Serving under Granny Goodness, the Harassers operated as security at the orphanage.

=== Headmaster Mind's school ===
Opening a school for crime, Headmaster Mind trained the Top, Tattooed Man, and Matter Master to take on the Justice League.

=== Helix ===
Helix is a supervillain group. They are six who were experimented on by Dr. Benjamin Love when they were still in the womb of their respective mothers. These kids consisted of Mister Bones, Penny Dreadful, Kritter, Tao Jones, Baby Boom, and Arak Wind-Walker. Carcharo, the cousin of Yolanda Montez, was briefly associated with Helix at one point. This group has clashed with Infinity, Inc. on occasion.

==== Helix in other media ====
A variation of Helix appears in Stargirl. The organization is known as the Helix Institute of Youth Rehabilitation, which is run by Mister Bones and Nurse Louise Love.

=== The Higher Power ===
An evil reptilian version of the Authority, the Higher Power lead the Chimera. Its members included Mistress Midnighter, Apollyon, Alienist, Technician, Devour, and Ecos.

=== The Hounds ===
One of the top units in Tao's criminal organization is the Hounds. Led by Holden Carver, it includes Blackwolf and Pit Bull.

=== House of Conquest ===
A faction in the Eternal War led by Infinite Woman which included The Kill, The Hunt, and The Bloodless.

=== House of Opal ===
Under Dark Opal, House of Opal sought to control Gemworld. Its members included Carnelian and Sardonyx.

=== Hybrid ===
The Hybrid is a supervillain group that were formed by Mento from people who suffered from accidents. Upon gathering these people following their respective accidents, Mento experimented on them with the artificial compound Promethium, turning many of them into superhuman freaks. The Hybrid consists of Behemoth, Gorgon, Harpi, Prometheus, Pteradon, Scirocco, and Touch-N-Go. Following a fight with the Teen Titans, each of the members were cured of their insanity by Raven.

=== Hypothetical Army ===
When General Dvory Tuzik wanted to defeat the Justice League, he employed Sybil the Hypothetical Woman to create a meta-human force to aid him. She produced for him Ghost Lion, Marieke, Soldat, Jin Si, Dybbuk, and Velocista.

== I ==
=== Ice Pack ===
A team of cold-themed super-villains, Mr. Freeze, Minister Blizzard, Blue Snowman, Captain Cold, Killer Frost, and the Icicle battled the Super Friends as the Ice Pack (also known as Cold Warriors).

=== Illuminati ===
Developing out of the Brotherhood of the Light, the Illuminati is an organization founded by Vandal Savage and Garn Daanuth that has spanned centuries and includes some of history's most influential figures. Today, it largely serves as part of Savage's goal toward world domination.

=== The Immutables ===
Led by Dr. Marius Chung, the Immutables are immortals that seek to hide their existence from the world. Morien, Ambrus, Dawa, and Gudrun are among their ranks.

=== Ingrid Weiss and Albrecht Strong ===
Mother and son, Ingrid Weiss and Albrecht Strong are Nazis who regularly battle Albrecht's father Tom Strong.

=== Injustice Army ===
A group of children who idolized supervillains and followed in their footsteps. Led by Rex Luthor, they included Grundette, Bane Jr., Kid Weather Wizard, and Doomsdame.

=== Injustice Gang ===
The Injustice Gang is a supervillain group who oppose the Justice League.

The first incarnation was led by Libra, Construct, and Abra Kadabra and consisted of Chronos, Mirror Master, Poison Ivy, Scarecrow, Shadow Thief, and Tattooed Man.

The second incarnation was led by Lex Luthor and consisted of Circe, Doctor Light, the General, Jemm, the Joker, Mirror Master, Ocean Master, Prometheus, and Queen Bee.

==== Injustice Gang in other media ====
- Two incarnations of the Injustice Gang appear in Justice League. The first incarnation appears in the episode "Injustice For All", formed and led by Lex Luthor and consisting of the Cheetah, Copperhead, the Joker, Shade, Solomon Grundy, Star Sapphire, and the Ultra-Humanite to combat the Justice League. In the episode "Fury", Aresia reassembles the Injustice Gang with Copperhead, Shade, Solomon Grundy, Star Sapphire, and Tsukuri.
- The Injustice Gang appears in Justice League: Injustice for All, led by Lex Luthor and consisting of the Joker, Felix Faust, Star Sapphire, Ultra-Humanite, and Shade.

=== Injustice Incarnate ===
Heroes and villains from across the multiverse assembled by Psycho-Pirate and duped into serving Darkseid.

=== Injustice League ===
The Injustice League are the antagonists of the Justice League. The Injustice League has been through three incarnations.

The first incarnation was led by Agamemno and consisted of Lex Luthor, Black Manta, Catwoman, Chronos, Doctor Light, Felix Faust, Mister Element, Penguin, Sinestro, and Zoom.

The second incarnation was the Injustice League International, consisting of Cluemaster, Major Disaster, Clock King, Big Sir, Multi-Man, and the Mighty Bruce. Maxwell Lord turned this group into the Justice League Antarctica while adding G'nort and Scarlet Skier to the group.

The third incarnation was the Injustice League International and was formed by Lex Luthor, Cheetah, and Joker. Its core membership consists of Cheshire, Deathstroke, Doctor Light, Fatality, Giganta, Gorilla Grodd, Killer Frost, Mr. Freeze, Parasite, Poison Ivy, Shadow Thief, and Shaggy Man. Other known members are Black Manta, Clayface, Doctor Sivana, Double Dare, Effigy, Felix Faust, Girder, Hammer and Sickle, Hyena, Iron Cross of the Aryan Brigade, Jewelee, Jinx, Key, Killer Croc, Lady Vic, Major Force, Magenta, Mammoth, Manticore, Metallo, Mister Terrible, Mirror Master, Monsieur Mallah, Nocturna, Phobia, Prankster, Psimon, Queen Bee, Rag Doll, Riddler, Rock, Scarecrow, Shimmer, Shrapnel, Silver Monkey, Skorpio, Sonar, T. O. Morrow, Tar Pit, Toyman, Tremor of the Superior Five, Two-Face, and Warp.

In 2011, "The New 52" rebooted the DC universe. During the "Forever Evil" storyline, Lex Luthor forms a version of the Injustice League to combat the Crime Syndicate of America. It consists of Bizarro, Black Adam, Black Manta, Captain Cold, Catwoman, Deathstroke, and Sinestro.

==== Other versions ====
Blue Falcon and Dynomutt faced the Injustice League of America in the Dynomutt, Dog Wonder episode "The Injustice League of America". This version featured the Gimmick, Fishface, Worm, Lowbrow, Queen Hornet, and Superthug. The group later appeared in Scooby-Doo! Team-Up in the story "It Was a Dark and Gritty Knight...", where they were reunited by Manyfaces to combat Blue Falcon, Dynomutt, and Mystery, Inc. The Worm made a reference to the other Injustice League but, being supervillains, they did not care about copyright infringement.

==== Injustice League in other media ====
- The Injustice League appear in the Smallville episode "Injustice", consisting of Livewire, Neutron, Plastique, Parasite, and Eva Greer. They initially search for Doomsday until Tess Mercer assumes control of LuthorCorp and begins recruiting metahumans to form a team of heroes to defend Earth. After Neutron is killed by Doomsday, Mercer kills Livewire using an explosive chip implanted in the latter's skull. When Clark Kent discovers Greer's body and tells Parasite and Plastique, they disable the chips and attempt to form their own group of criminals, only to be defeated by Kent and Green Arrow.
- The Injustice League appears in the Young Justice episode "Revelation", consisting of Count Vertigo, Poison Ivy, Black Adam, Wotan, Atomic Skull, the Ultra-Humanite, and the Joker. This version of the group was created to serve as scapegoats for the Light and distract the Justice League and the Team from their plans.
- The Injustice League appears in the second season of Harley Quinn, consisting of Bane, the Riddler, the Penguin, Mr. Freeze, and Two-Face. This version of the group came together to take control of Gotham City after the Joker destroyed it and divide its ruins between them. After Harley Quinn interferes with their plans, they attempt to negotiate peace with her, but she disagrees with them. Over the course of the season, the League is gradually dismantled, with Harley and her crew murdering the Penguin, capturing the Riddler, and defeating Bane while Freeze sacrifices himself to cure his wife Nora Fries, and Commissioner Gordon defeats and incarcerates Two-Face.

=== Injustice League Dark ===
The Injustice League Dark is a villain group that antagonizes the Justice League Dark. The team was founded by Circe after she aided the Justice League Dark in defeating Hecate and, unknowingly to them, allow Circe to inherit the goddess' powers. She first recruits Floronic Man after he is empowered by consuming the King of Petals, a champion of the Green. Circe later recruits Klarion the Witch Boy with his familiar Teekl, Papa Midnite, and Solomon Grundy.

=== Injustice Syndicate ===
The evil equivalent of Justice League International from a parallel universe in Batman: The Brave and the Bold. The Injustice Syndicate included Owlman (Batman's counterpart), Blue Bowman (Green Arrow's counterpart), Dyna-Mite (Atom's counterpart), Scarlet Scarab (Blue Beetle's counterpart), and Silver Cyclone (Red Tornado's counterpart), as well as unnamed counterparts of Aquaman, Plastic Man, Fire, B'wana Beast, and Wildcat.

=== The Irredeemables ===
Castoffs of the Immutables, the Irredeemables are crazed monsters.

=== The Insiders ===
An alliance between Lex Luthor and Brainiac that infiltrated the Outsiders and Teen Titans with Indigo (Brainiac 8) and Superboy.

=== International Crime Combine ===
The International Crime Combine is a supraorganization made up of operatives from various other criminal organizations some based in the DC Comics universe, like CYCLOPS and O.G.R.E., and other fictional organizations such as THRUSH and SPECTRE. They opposed G.E.O.R.G.E., a covert agency of the United States, and the Blackhawks.

=== I.O. ===
International Operations, or I.O. (also I/O), was a government agency headed up by Miles Craven who had an obsession with superhumans. Seeking to cheat death and develop an army of super-powered servants, Craven initiated multiple programs that inadvertently produced numerous subjects who became superheroes. Craven was downloaded into several clone bodies unsuccessfully and employed his own personal enhanced unit in the Brotherhood.

=== Invaders from the Snowflake ===
In a bid to create a better world, a group of adventurers built the world's first supercomputer that can answer the riddle of world peace. Developing what they described as a snowflake of billions of universes, one of the worlds within the theoretical construct resisted its role as an experiment and seven powerful metahumans escaped to stop the supercomputer to preserve their life. The invaders from the snowflake were killed but at the cost of all but one of the adventurers' lives (Doc Brass being the sole survivor).

== J ==
=== Jesters' League of America ===
Battling the Super Friends, the Joker assembled the Jesters' League of America with Harley Quinn, Prankster, Trickster and the duo Punch and Jewelee

=== Jet-Bow Squad ===
An Apokoliptian unit serving under Kanto.

=== JLAxis ===
On Earth-10 where Nazis rule the world, the Gerechtigkeitliga is their planet's Justice League. Its members include Overman, Brunhilde, Leatherwing, Hawkman, Hawkgirl, Flash, and Green Lantern. Post-Flashpoint, Earth-10's Justice League became the New Reichsmen which featured Overman, Overgirl, Brünhilde, Leatherwing, Blitzen, Martian, Underwaterman, Green Lantern, and Red Tornado.

==== JLAxis in other media ====
In the Arrowverse crossover event "Crisis on Earth-X", Dark Arrow is the Führer and leader of the New Reichsmen which includes Overgirl, Blitzkrieg, Black Arrow, and Siren-X.

=== Joker League of Anarchy ===
A group formed by Emperor Joker that included Bizarro #1, Ignition, Enigma, Bounty, Gravedigger Lad, Skizm, Lois Lane, Harley Quinn, Poison Ivy, and Scorch.

== K ==
=== Kabuki Twins ===
The Kabuki Twins are the Penguin's minions in The Batman.

==== Kabuki Twins in other media ====
The Kabuki Twins appear in The Lego Batman Movie.

=== Killer Elite ===
A team of elite assassins made up of Bolt, Deadshot, Deadline, Chiller, and Merlyn.

=== King Kull's gang ===
Ruler of the Beast-Men, King Kull assembled Brainiac, Joker, Penguin, Blockbuster, Queen Clea, Ibac, Mr. Atom, Dr. Light, Shade, and the Weeper in a bid to conquer three Earths.

=== Knights of Knavery ===
The criminal duo of the Joker and the Penguin who first teamed in the story "Knights of Knavery".

== L ==
=== Lawless League ===
When the Johnny Thunder of Earth-One comes into possession of the Thunderbolt genie, he has him use his power to transform his gang into a version of the Justice League called the Lawless League. Ripper Jones, Race Morrison, Barney Judson, Eddie Orson, Bill Gore, and Monk Loomis became versions of Superman, Flash, Atom, Martian Manhunter, Batman, and Green Lantern, respectively.

=== League Busters ===
Formed in the vein of the Suicide Squad, the League Busters were sanctioned by the United Nations to combat Justice League International should the need arise. Led by Peacemaker, the group consisted of Chromax, Mirror Master, Spellbinder, and Ultraa.

=== League of Ancients ===
The League of Ancients is a group assembled to combat the Justice League. They consist of the Atlantean sorceress Gamemnae (who foresaw the Justice League as the "Seven-Headed Hydra" that would threaten Atlantis), Rama Khan, Manitou Raven, a fallen alien known as the Anointed One, a Northern Eurasian man called the Whaler, a pre-Aztec man named Tezumak, and a weapon-woman named Sela.

==== League of Ancients in other media ====
Members of the League of Ancients appear in Supergirl, depicted as aliens from Krypton's sister planet Jarhanpur.

=== League of Annoyance ===
Led by Praying Mantis, the League of Annoyance included Aunt Phetamine, Cell Phone Sylvia, Drunkula (Baron Nightblood), Filo Math, Malingerer, and the Scrambler.

=== League of Challenger Haters ===
Composed of the Challengers of the Unknown's greatest foes, Kra brought together Drabny, Volcano Man, and Multi-Man as the League of Challenger Haters. Later, Multi-Man took control of the group and added Multi-Woman to their ranks.

=== League of Villainy ===
Led by the Riddler, the League of Villainy included Black Bison, Black Mask, Captain Boomerang, Captain Cold, Doctor Poison, Doctor Psycho, Doctor Sivana, Giganta, Heat Wave, Hector Hammond, Joker, Judge of Owls, Mad Hatter, Marionette, Mime, Mirror Master, Mr. Freeze, Moonbow, Penguin, Professor Pyg, Scarecrow, Sonar, Tattooed Man, Top, Two-Face, and Typhoon.

=== Legion of Dead Heroes ===
Formed by Mordru, the Legion of Dead Heroes were zombie versions of Sun Boy, Karate Kid, Ferro Lad, Invisible Kid, Blok, Triplicate Girl, Chemical King, Magnetic Kid, and Reflecto.

=== Legion of Horribles ===
In the Gotham universe, Jerome Valeska assembled the Penguin, Scarecrow, Mad Hatter, Solomon Grundy, Mr. Freeze, and Firefly as the Legion of Horribles to create chaos in Gotham.

=== Legion of Sivanas ===
An organization of Sivanas from across the multiverse.

=== Legion of Stupor-Bizarros ===
A Bizarro version of the Legion of Super-Heroes. It included Bizarro versions of Lightning Lad, Saturn Girl, Cosmic Boy, Chameleon Boy, Invisible Kid, Ultra Boy, Mon-El, and Brainiac 5.

=== Legion of Weird ===
Indebted to the Lord of the Netherworlds Om, the Legion of Weird is made up of Count Karnak, Hordred, Kaftu, Madoga, and Mistress Vera Wycker who battled the Challengers of the Unknown.

=== Legion of Zoom ===
The Legion of Zoom is a team that is led by Professor Zoom / Reverse-Flash (Eobard Thawne) who brought together Captain Cold, the Golden Glider, Gorilla Grodd, Tar Pit, the Tornado Twins, the Trickster, and the Turtle. They start to attack the Flash on all fronts to the point where Thawne starts to take over the Flash's body enough that the Flash Family had to assemble to combat him. After Thawne in Barry's body tries to get Captain Cold, the Golden Glider, Gorilla Grodd, and the Turtle to dig up Nora Allen's body, the Trickster and the Tornado Twins try to stop him when the rest of the Flash family shows up, only to be returned to their own timelines. When Thawne is exorcised from Barry Allen, he rounds up every villain who hates the Flash family to expand his Legion of Zoom, including Abra Kadabra, Belladonna of Gemini, Blacksmith, Bloodwork, Double Down, Fiddler, Folded Man, Girder, Papercut, Peek-a-Boo, Plunder, Rag Doll, Razer, Thinker, and Top.

==== Legion of Zoom in other media ====
- An unrelated iteration of the Legion of Zoom appears in Batwheels, consisting of the Joker's Jokermobile Prank, Harley Quinn's ATV Jestah, the Riddler's helicopter Quizz, the Penguin's boat Ducky, Mr. Freeze's snowcrawler Snowy, the Batcomputer's rival Badcomputer, and a crash test dummy-esque robot named Crash.
- The Legion of Zoom appears in The Flash series finale "A New World", led by Eddie Thawne / Cobalt Blue and consisting of the Reverse-Flash, Zoom, Savitar, and Godspeed.

=== Les Mille Yeux ===
Les Mille Yeux, "The Thousand Eyes", was a major international crime cartel involved in drugs, arms smuggling, and political blackmail. The Phantom Lady fought and blinded their Washington, D.C. leader, Edwin Guerrehart. Their first appearance was in Action Comics Weekly #636. Les Mille Yeux later hired Colonel Computron to kidnap Starman.

=== Littleville Gang ===
Creating a tourist attraction for Littleville, the gang of Fisherman, Baron Tyrano, Lamplighter, Strobe, and the Terrible Trio performed mock crimes for entertainment.

=== Locus ===
Locus is an international group of criminal scientists which conspired with the Appellaxian aliens to take over the world. Locus placed members of the Doom Patrol, Justice Society of America, and Justice League into special internment camps and stole their limbs in order to create perfect bodies for themselves. They first appeared in JLA: Year One #1 (January 1998).

=== Loki's army ===
Fighting the Norse Gods at Ragnarök, Loki's army faced an amalgamation of the gods and Justice Society of America due to the machinations of Adolf Hitler. The evil forces included Fenrir, Garm, the Midgard Serpent, and Surtur.

=== Luck League ===
A group of villains assembled by Amos Fortune made up of Acrobat, Crier, Cyclone, Racer, Shrinking Man, Strongman, and Water King.

== M ==
=== M'mannix ===
A creature living on the surface of Mars, the Martian Mountain M'mannix is one of the most dangerous creatures on the planet.

=== Ma Gunn's School for Boys ===
A boys' school for crime run by Ma Gunn.

=== MAZE ===
MAZE was an international espionage agency that stole information from around the world to sell to the highest bidder. They also undertook assignments to discredit political dissidents and assassinate world leaders. MAZE had access to a number of super-weapons and was constantly seeking new items for its arsenal. They first appeared in Superman #268. MAZE operatives frequently fought Batgirl and Robin in the pages of Batman Family in the 1970s.

=== Mainframe ===
Technology-based group led by Override that included Baud, Download, Output, and Scareware.

=== Man-Bat and She-Bat ===
A husband and wife team, Man-Bat and She-Bat transformed themselves into bat-creatures that troubled Gotham City.

=== Many Arms of Death ===
The Many Arms of Death is a terrorist group from Coryana that have fought Batwoman. Each of its members are named after a weapon (e.g. Knife, Needle, Rifle) due to the play on the "arms" portion of the name. The Many Arms of Death uses a legitimate company called the Kali Corporation as a front.

==== Many Arms of Death in other media ====
The Many Arms of Death appear in the second season of Batwoman.

=== Marabunta ===
A group of mercenaries in high-tech army ant armor that battled Batwing.

=== Mayhem ===
Led by KGBeast, Mayhem included Stranglehold, Cheshire, Braze, NKVDemon, and Maelstrom.

=== Men from N.O.W.H.E.R.E. ===
First appearing in Doom Patrol (vol. 2) #35, the Men from N.O.W.H.E.R.E. is an organization that is dedicated to the extermination of eccentricity and difference after their soul husks have been harvested by the Agency and the Telephone Avatar during World War II. They once captured Flex Mentallo and targeted Danny the Street.

==== Men from N.O.W.H.E.R.E. in other media ====
In the TV series Doom Patrol, the Bureau of Normalcy is based on the Men from N.O.W.H.E.R.E.

=== Menagerie ===
During the "Forever Evil" storyline, Cheetah started a group called the Menagerie which consists of animal-like characters like Elephant Man, Hellhound, Lion-Mane, Mäuschen, Primeape, and Zebra-Man. Steve Trevor and Killer Frost fought them in the park when working to get the Lasso of Truth from Cheetah. While Steve Trevor defeated Cheetah and claimed the Lasso of Truth, Killer Frost froze the Menagerie and escaped.

=== Micro/Squad ===
A group of CIA operatives who drew the ire of the Atom and were shrunk to six-inches as a consequence. Dubbed Micro/Squad, the team is led by Blacksnake and includes Mr. Baily, Ms. Hubbard, Ginsburg, and Sting.

=== Minister Blizzard's gang ===
When Minister Blizzard and Shadow-Thief conspired to plunge the Earth into another Ice Age, the former manipulated Captain Cold and the Icicle to help.

=== The Misfits ===
Organized by Killer Moth, the Misfits was an assembly of some of Batman's lesser foes in hopes their combined power could be more formidable. Its members included Catman, Calendar Man, and Chancer.

=== Monarch's Army ===
Formed from across the multiverse by Monarch, Monarch's Army included the Crime Society, JLAxis, Extremists, Queen Belthera, Earth-43 Batman, and Earth-7 Starwoman.

=== Monster League of Evil ===
Captain Thunder's greatest foes, the Monster League of Evil included Frankenstein's Monster, Dracula, Wolf-Man, and the Mummy.

=== Multiplex's gang ===
Assembled by Multiplex to battle Firestorm, the group included Slipknot, Hyena, Mindboggler, and Bolt. When Jason Rusch became Firestorm, Multiplex assembled another gang but with Killer Frost, Black Bison, Hyena, Plastique, and Typhoon.

== N ==
=== The Nameless ===
A mysterious collective of shadowy entities, the Nameless count Synnar and Deacon Dark among their followers as the Eternal Light Corporation is a front for their organization.

=== Nasty's Nasties ===
A biker gang assembled by Nasthalthia Luthor, Nasty's Nasties were meant to help draw out Supergirl.

=== Natural Disasters ===
As the leader of the Legion of Doom in Harley Quinn, Poison Ivy mentors Volcana, Terra, and Tefé as the Natural Disasters.

=== Negative Forces ===
In the Arrowverse, the avatars of the Forces in Deon Owens, Psych, and Fuerza are infected and possessed by the Negative Forces of their powers and align to resurrect the Reverse-Flash.

=== N.E.M.O. ===
Nautical Enforcement of Macrocosmic Order, or N.E.M.O for short, is a hundred year old secret society introduced in DC Rebirth. Founded by "Fisher King", it is intent on controlling the world, bringing them in conflict with Aquaman. Its members included King, Professor Ivo, King Shark and Black Manta.

=== Network ===
There are three different versions of Network:

==== First Network ====
The original Network members were a band of small-time villains whose metagenes were triggered by the Monitor shortly before the Crisis on Infinite Earths. The six criminals drew on broadcast power beamed down from a special satellite owned by the rock video channel RTV. The Network members were Blue Matt (invisibility), Cathode (electrokinetic), Erase (acid touch), Fast Forward (enhances kinetic potential), UHF (manipulates audible and inaudible soundwaves), and Volume (can increase mass and density). The first Network was defeated by Superman and Batman. The Network first appeared in World's Finest Comics #311 (January 1985).

==== Second Network ====
The second Network is a black market for supervillains based in Keystone City. This Network has been run by a villainess named Blacksmith. Its services are frequently used by Kobra. The Network's base is protected by the Rogues, and the Colonel Computron units.

==== Third Network ====
The third Network is a widespread organization of criminals operating in Gotham City. Businesswoman Celia Kazantkakis (Athena), used the Network to get her revenge against the Gotham Rossetti mob. After a clash with Batman and his allies the Network was crippled, but Kazantkakis escaped. Known Network operatives are: the Tracker, the Technician, Doctor Excess, Bugg, the Suicide King, Mister Fun, and Freeway.

=== New Olympians ===
Founded by Maxie Zeus, the New Olympians were his underlings when he sought to abduct athlete Lacinia Nitocris. Its members included Antaeus, Argus, Diana, Nox, Proteus, and Vulcanus.

=== New Order ===
The New Order was a group of metahumans named Cain, Ammo, Corona, and Scud who commandeered a nuclear facility and demanded "one billion dollars and all mutant wild life freed". The Flash and Green Lantern took them down in Justice Society of America (vol. 2) #1.

=== N.O.W.H.E.R.E. ===
The organization of N.O.W.H.E.R.E., founded by the futuristic man called Harvest, with their main goal to extort and control teen heroes (both powered and non-powered) like the Teen Titans and the Legion Lost. The members are Batus, Centerhall, Crush, Fuji, Hammerfist, Leash, Misbelief, Psykill, Doctor Umber, Templar, and Windstrom. Former members are a clone of Caitlin Fairchild, Grunge, Omen, Ravager, Ridge, Shadow Walker, Superboy, and Warblade.

Introduced in the New 52, N.O.W.H.E.R.E. are the main villains in the crossover The Culling as they lead their own army of Ravagers against the teens in their own arena called The Colony.

=== Ninth Circle ===
The Ninth Circle is an international group of corrupt business executives, originally founded by Robert Queen and Dante. The group's leaders have their meetings wearing masks to prevent any of them from betraying the others should they get caught. The Ninth Circle has a private army called the Burned, who are created through a baptism in lava and turned into mindless servants. The Ninth Circle serve as prominent villains throughout Green Arrow: Rebirth.

==== Ninth Circle in other media ====
The Ninth Circle appears in season 7 of Arrow. Its notable members include Emiko Queen, the group's leader in the present timeline until the season finale, Beatrice who became the new leader, Dante, and Virgil.

=== Nuclear Legion ===
A team of nuclear-themed supervillains introduced in Battle for Bludhaven whose membership included Professor Radium, Nuclear, Mister Nitro, Geiger, Reactron, and Neutron.

== O ==
=== O Squad ===
In an Elseworlds, Starro organized a team of Justice League foes whose name ended in the letter "O" as the O Squad. Its membership included Amazo, Bizarro, Chemo, Despero, Kanjar Ro, Metallo, Sinestro, Starro, Titano, and T. O. Morrow. The team behind Justice League briefly considered an All-O Squad featuring the likes of Amazo, Despero, Starro, Chemo, and Bizarro before deciding it was too hokey.

=== O.G.R.E. ===
O.G.R.E. is an acronym used by two different groups in the DC Universe.

==== First O.G.R.E. ====
Created by Bob Haney and Nick Cardy, this group first appeared in Aquaman #26 (July 1976).

The first incarnation of O.G.R.E. (short for Organization for General Revenge and Enslavement) is a small mercenary terrorist group, led by the black-hooded Supreme One. Operating for an unnamed foreign government, they have confronted Aquaman in a number of occasions and worked through either hired agents, such as Black Manta, or coerced ones, such as Typhoon and Huntress.

==== Second O.G.R.E. ====
First appearing in Aquaman (vol. 4) #9 (August 1992) and within the context of the DC Universe, the second incarnation of O.G.R.E. (short for the Ocean Going Resource Exchange and also referred to as the "Exchange") is a corporate extension of Merrevale Oil created by Jordan Wylie. Publicly presenting itself as an environmental firm, its actual activities bring it into conflict with Aquaman and the Sea Devils. This results in Wylie being removed from public positions at Merrevale and the Exchange.

=== Oblivion Front ===
The Oblivion Front, whose forces were clad in blue, red, and gold armor, was "a terrorist splinter group" led by Dominion (Dominique Duchamp). Dominion herself wore a similar, less-armored costume and had a scar down the right side of her face. Dominion later led the Oblivion Front in an assault during which they intended to raid a weapons vault. Instead, the entire group was taken down by Gunfire. They first appeared in Showcase '94 #1.

=== Ocean Master's robot duplicates ===
When Atlanna was driven mad and sought the death of her son Aquaman, she aligned with Ocean Master who had robot duplicates of his brother's most dangerous foes produced. Such included Black Manta, Scavenger, Fisherman, Shark, Starro, Marine Marauder, Captain Demo, and Seaquake.

=== Old Gods of Evil ===
Founded by Lokee, the Old Gods of Evil was a faction in the Urgrund civil war. At the climax of the war when the planet was split in two, Yuga Khan lead and founded Apokolips.

=== Omega ===
The murders of several foreign intelligence agents led Batman on an international search for answers. In the course of the case, Batman learned of the abduction of Hungarian physicist Lucas Nagy and eventually pieced together clues that indicated that a terrorist organization known as Omega had forced him to build a 20-megaton nuclear bomb. When the terrorists threatened Gotham City with a nuclear holocaust, Batman's own experiences seemed to back up their claims. Eventually, Batman discovered that Omega's leader had manipulated everyone. Unable to force Nagy to create such a bomb, the leader realized that no one would know whether Omega truly had a bomb and set out to convince everyone that it did exist, with Batman as "Omega's prime witness". Their only appearance is in Batman #281–283.

=== One Earth Regime ===
Based in the Injustice universe, the One Earth Regime was founded by Superman to rule the Earth. Its membership included Wonder Woman, Hawkgirl, Cyborg, Green Lantern, Flash, Shazam, John Stewart, Spectre, Swamp Thing, King Shark, Bane, Catwoman, Supergirl, Ares, Aquaman, Metamorpho, Black Lightning, Sinestro, Killer Croc, Clayface, Penguin, Raven, Nightwing, Killer Frost, Girder, Black Adam, Solomon Grundy, and Doomsday while Lex Luthor acted as a mole for Batman's Insurgency.

=== Order of Ancient Mysteries ===
Founded by Roderick Burgess, the Order of Ancient Mysteries sought to gain power through occult means.

=== Order of St. Dumas ===
The Order of St. Dumas, originally part of the Knights Templar and also called the Sacred Order of Saint Dumas, were a group of soldier-monks that were formed during the Crusades. The Order enriched itself, though, during the Crusades, then went into hiding. The Order's first champion was an Asian man named Stephen Forrest Lee, the assassin known to Mark Shaw as Dumas. The failure of this champion splintered the order. The main branch retreated and the violent splinter elements created a new champion called Azrael, a hereditary title given to the splinter Order's near-superhuman enforcer and assassin. Members of the splinter Order enlarged the organization's power by killing their enemies, hoarding knowledge, and kidnapping some of the greatest thinkers in the world. The Order also invented "disinformation", to ensure that the theories of the kidnapped geniuses would look so silly that nobody would miss them or examine their research. With a large amount of help from Azrael (Jean-Paul Valley), the splinter group was apparently scattered.

==== Order of St. Dumas in other media ====
The Order of St. Dumas appears in the second season of Gotham. This version of the Dumas family were one of the founders of Gotham City until Caleb Dumas had an affair with Celestine Wayne. After cutting off Caleb's hand with a knife, the Wayne family forced the Dumases into exile, where some of them took refuge with a religious extension of the family, while others remained behind and their last names were changed to Galavan.

=== Order of the Scythe ===
Also known as the Reapers, the Order of the Scythe was a mercenary band including Nick Gage, Figment, Harmony, Jabberwock, Miranda, and Slipstream.

=== Orisha-Nla ===
The shadow forms of the Orisha, its members include dark versions of Shango, Jakuta, Erinle, Ogun, Adiremi, and Ochun. A dark version of Firestorm also emerged in Shadowstorm.

== P ==
=== Panther Gang ===
A group of thieves and robbers dressed in panther-inspired costumes, the Panther Gang crossed paths with the Atom. A member of the gang later joined a team of Atom villains to battle the hero's inheritor.

=== Parliament of Decay ===
Representing the Black and in opposition of the other elemental Parliaments, Parliament of Decay is death with Anton Arcane its avatar. Abby Holland later supplanted her father's role and has counted Detritus and Sethe among its ranks.

=== People's Heroes ===
The People's Heroes are a group of Russian agents that consists of Bolshoi, Molotov, Pravda, and Hammer & Sickle.

=== People's Liberation Army ===
The People's Liberation Army (commonly known as the "Death's Head") first made its impact on Gotham City with a ten-week assault that included bombing banks, federal office buildings, and courthouses. Their terror campaign paralyzed the city. They were led by Thanatos, clad in a skull mask, a green costume and red cape, gloves and boots, and secretly an Italian terrorist named Sophia Santos.

The PLA later resurfaced in Washington, D.C., agreeing to "accidentally" kill an anti-crime senator during one of their attacks in exchange for a delivery of weapons and explosives from syndicate queen Irene Scarfield. The leader of this PLA operation was Bloodclaw, a bald, bearded man with crimson steel fingernails. He disappeared into the Potomac River following a fight with Batman and was presumed dead.

=== Point Men ===
The Point Men are foes of Young Justice.

=== Power Posse ===
The evil equivalent of the Super Buddies in a parallel universe.

=== Prankster and Toyman ===
Foes of Superman, Prankster and Toyman collaborated to battle their mutual enemy.

=== Prince Daka's gang ===
A team of Japanese agents, Prince Daka lead Sumo the Samurai, Kung, and Tsunami.

=== Printer's Devil's gang ===
A trio of people whose lives were ruined by technological progress, Printer's Devil, Pinball Wizard, and Bad Penny attacked the World's Fair.

=== The Prodigals ===
The higher-ups of Tao's criminal organization are the Prodigals which include Peter Grimm, Miss Misery, and Holden Carver.

=== Psi-Phon and Dreadnaught ===
An alien duo that fought Superman.

== Q ==
=== Quorum ===
The Quorum is a rogue American agency. Its agents included Martika the Enchantress, Militia, Major Force, Dementor, Black Serpent, Enforcer, Sledge, and Devlin.

== R ==
=== Rainbow Raiders ===
Since Rainbow Raider's death, a team of color-themed supervillains have dubbed themselves the Rainbow Raiders in his honor.

Each member of the Rainbow Raiders has powers based on their color:

- Red has super strength.
- Orange has fire powers.
- Yellow has super speed and electrical powers.
- Green manipulates plants.
- Blue is made of water.
- Indigo has shadow powers.
- Violet controls air and wind.

After the death of the first Captain Boomerang, a funeral was held that every villain ever to face Flash attended. Among the large crowd was an eclectic group of metahumans calling themselves the "Rainbow Raiders", in honor of the late Flash villain. Their sentiments, expressed during the service, seemed to denote that the group was relatively new to the scene, and had little exposure, standing, or experience working together.

During the Blackest Night storyline, the Raiders commit mass suicide in a bid to join the Black Lantern Corps. However, they remain dead because they lack any emotional ties to attract a black power ring.

=== The Ravens ===
A band of female mercenaries led by Cheshire, the Ravens included Pistolera, Vicious, and Termina and became a thorn in the side of Gotham City's heroes.

=== Red Brotherhood ===
A faction of Green Martians from Mars II led by the Marshal, the Red Brotherhood overthrew their planet and tried to conquer Earth. Among their ranks was Martian Manhunter's lover J'en.

=== Red Claw ===
A terrorist organization led by a woman of the same name, Red Claw battled Batman in the DC Animated Universe.

=== Red Shift ===
An enemy of the Ravers, Red Shift included Drrt, Klo, Red Death, and Whoon.

=== Religion of Crime ===
A cult formed around the Crime Bible tied to Darkseid and Cain. It included Stanton and Giselle Carlyle, Mother Superior, Sinclair, Mistress Alice, Sister Wrack, Sister Shard, and Brother Flay.

==== Religion of Crime in other media ====
The Religion of Crime served as loose inspiration for the Wonderland Gang in Batwoman.

=== The Rithm ===
The equivalent of a Parliament for the Metal, the Rithm was led by Machine Queen and included Omega Calculus, A Calculus, B Calculus, and C Calculus.

=== Robins ===
A group of feral, Jokerized children under the control of The Batman Who Laughs.

=== Robots of Terror ===
Created by Doc Robot, the Robots of Terror included Aluminum, Barium, Calcium, Plutonium, Sodium, and Zirconium.

=== Robot Renegades ===
The Robot Renegades are a robotic team appearing in American comic books published by DC Comics.

Seeking the supremacy of machines over humans, they first appeared as a team in Metal Men (vol. 3) #2 (2007). The group consists of U.N.I.O.N., Warbox, Body X, L-Ron, and Manhunter Lud of the Manhunters. In Metal Men (vol. 3) #3, they would assist Will Magnus in defeating the Death Metal Men, although purely for their own reasons.

== S ==
=== Satan's champions ===
When Captain Marvel fought to save the soul of his uncle Ebenezer Batson, he had to face Satan's champions: Abaddon, Medea, Antaeus, Old Age, Legion, and Truth.

=== School for Super-Villains ===
Founded by Tarik the Mute, the School for Super-Villains helped form the basis of the Legion of Super-Villains.

=== S.C.Y.T.H.E. ===
S.C.Y.T.H.E. was an anti-government terrorist organization from a European country called Lugwainia. They abducted brilliant aeronautics engineer Robert Selkirk, who had spent years as a political prisoner in a pseudo-Soviet nation before gaining asylum in the United States, and they demanded an exchange with their imprisoned leader, Alexander Sorkhan. A United Nations team consisting of Diana Prince and Steve Trevor were assigned to go with Selkirk to the exchange, but they were waylaid by the terrorists and betrayed by Selkirk himself, who helped Sorkhan escape. Their first and only appearance was in Wonder Woman #244.

=== Servants of Darkness ===
Clones made of Superman, Orion, Kalibak, Lydea Mallor, and an unknown Guardian of the Universe by Darkseid to service his resurrection in the 30th century.

=== Seven Devils of Thanagar ===
Deities once worshipped on Thanagar that were led by Onimar Synn the Sin-Eater and included Starbreaker. A death cult continues in the present that worship the Devils which included Sh'ri Valkyr.

=== Seven Men of Death ===
A faction within the League of Assassins made up of Detonator, Hook, Maduvu, Merlyn, Razorburn, Shellcase, and Whip.

=== Seven Sentinels ===
A group of child molesters who masqueraded as super heroes. The Seven Sentinels include Atoman, Hound, Sun Woman, Davy Jones, Sizzler, Scarlet Scepter, M'rrgla Qualtz, Black Boomerang, and Kingfisher.

=== Shadow-Force ===
Led by Darkstorm, Shadow-Force is a team of mercenaries hired by the Dubelz family to eliminate Hitman. It includes Cockatoo, Ironbolt, Mink, Panzer, and Twilight.

=== Silicon Syndicate ===
The Silicon Syndicate operates in the fictional city of Platinum Flats, which is most likely based on Silicon Valley. The Syndicate's principals were all metahumans who felt they had a free run of the city since no major superhero teams operate on the West Coast of the DC Comics universe. Known principals were Visionary, Gizmo, Kilg%re, the Matchmaker, the Calculator, the Collector, and the Joker. The group came into conflict with the Birds of Prey, who clashed with street level operatives, such as Carface, Diamond, the Gangly Man, the Mind Bullet, Topaz, and the Tuatara, before working their way up to the principals.

=== SKULL ===
The SKULL organization actively recruited discredited geniuses and outcast scientists at the behest of Albert Michaels, the first Atomic Skull. Their criminal agenda often brought them into conflict with the terrorist organization known as Kobra. They later expanded their criminal empire to the West Coast. Albert Michaels was one of the sleeper agents of rogue SKULL scientist Alysia Damalis. SKULL was introduced in 1976's Superman #301.

Skull was seemingly inactive until Simon Pons revitalized the group; Pons first appears in The Outsiders #6, but does not take an active role until Outsiders Annual #1 in a story entitled "The Skull..., The Serpent... and the Outsiders". In this story, Simon Pons rebuilds SKULL and renews their long-standing feud with Kobra.

=== S.P.I.D.E.R. ===
S.P.I.D.E.R. (short for Society for Political Instability and Diverted Economic Resources) was an international crime organization based in a hidden grotto near the Riviera. The eight "legs" of the organization were devoted to Arson, Drugs, Extortion, Fraud, Gambling, Theft, Assassination, and Terrorism.

The organization was led by a green costumed albino woman named Morella. S.P.I.D.E.R.'s stated intention was to ultimately destabilize all world governments and then use the chaos to make themselves rich. Most of Morella's operatives wore standard green, yellow, and red uniforms but her division chiefs, including the Spider and the Widow, had distinctive costumes. S.P.I.D.E.R.'s first and only appearance was in Catwoman (vol. 2) #48–49.

=== Sonar's gang ===
Sonar and his henchmen Throttle and Blindside.

=== Spyral ===
Spyral is a UN covert operations agency founded during the Cold War. Its original head, Agent Zero, decided to avoid getting involved in politics, and rather than recruiting from among the espionage services of NATO or the Warsaw Pact countries, instead recruited rebels: iconoclastic daredevils and rogue geniuses, and got them to use their mental and physical gifts to serve the agency.

At some point, it was revealed that Agent Zero was really a Nazi master spy codenamed Doctor Dedalus, and had been betraying the agency for his own ends. Soon after, the agency collapsed.

In response to the escalating war between Batman Incorporated and the Leviathan terrorist organization, the UN decided to reform Spyral and recruited Doctor Dedalus' long-thought-dead daughter, Kathy Kane, as its leader. Using her personal resources, she recruited enough of a force to convince Batman, Inc. to disband as soon as the conflict was done.

In 2011, "The New 52" rebooted the DC universe. In Prime-Earth's history, Doctor Dedalus created both Spyral and Leviathan as part of a deranged attempt at immortality, setting up the two organizations to oppose each other in a never-ending cycle of vendetta, and grooming his children to manage the two agencies.

=== Star Chamber ===
Formed in opposition of the Shadow Cabinet by Headmaster from within, Star Chamber sought to enslave humanity rather than protect it. Its founders included Ash, Rainsaw, Slag, Wytch, Funyl, and Transit and over time added Holocaust and Harm to its ranks. Heroes like Rocket and Xombi were tricked into joining for a time.

=== Stormwatch Zero clones ===
Formed by Henry Bendix, Stormwatch Zero was the precursor to Stormwatch. All but two of its members (Apollo and Midnighter) died on their inaugural mission. However, Bendix had the entire team cloned and left to guard his secret bunker. Appearing as zombified versions of the group, in addition to Apollo and Midnighter is Amaze, Impetus, Lamplight, Stalker, and Crow Jane. Amaze, Impetus, and Lamplight were resurrected as zombies prior to this by Ghoulgotha to kill Apollo and Midnighter.

=== Strike Force Kobra ===
Kobra researched every villain that ever fought Batman and how they each acquired their respective powers. After obtaining some test subjects, Kobra had his researchers use this information to transform them into Strike Force Kobra. The members consist of Clayface, Elemental Woman, Planet Master, Spectrumonster, and Zebra-Man. Kobra sent them to fight the Outsiders and infiltrate Stagg Enterprises. During the resulting fight, Spectrumonster was destroyed and the rest of Strike Force Kobra was defeated by the Outsiders and arrested by the police. During the Infinite Crisis storyline, Strike Force Kobra members Planet Master, Spectrumonster, and Zebra-Man appear as members of Alexander Luthor Jr.'s Secret Society of Super Villains.

Kobra would later form a second incarnation of Strike Force Kobra led by Lady Eve and consisting of Dervish, Fauna Faust, Syonide, and Windfall. When this version of Strike Force Kobra was defeated by Eradicator's incarnation of the Outsiders, Eve called Kobra for help only for him to tell them to surrender. This action caused a strain between Kobra and Eve.

=== Sunderland Corporation ===
Founded by General Avery Sunderland, the Sunderland Corporation was a ruthless conglomerate connected to the Defense Department Intelligence (DDI). Sunderland's daughter Constance as well as Alan Windsor were among upper management.

=== Super Enemies ===
An evil equivalent of the Super Friends from a parallel Earth.

=== Super Family ===
The evil equivalent of the Marvel Family in Justice League: Crisis on Two Earths which included Superwoman, Captain Super, Uncle Super, and Captain Super Jr.

=== Super Foes ===
The original Super Foes formed in opposition of the Super Friends and consisted of Toyman, Penguin, Poison Ivy, Cheetah, and the Human Flying Fish and junior members Toyboy, Chick, Honeysuckle, Kitten, and Sardine.

A later version was a Bizarro version of the Super Friends with Bizarro versions of Aquaman (Aquazarro), Wonder Woman (Bizarra), Batman (Batzarro), Apache Chief, Flash, Hawkman (Hawkzarro), Gleek, Winder Twins (Wunder Twinz), Green Lantern (Yellow Lanturn), and Black Vulcan.

=== Super-Villains ===
When Sportsmaster wanted to prove to Huntress that evil could triumph over good, he assembled the Super-Villains to face Earth's heroes in a game of baseball. His team consisted of Lex Luthor, Joker, Weather Wizard, Doctor Polaris, Tattooed Man, Chronos, Matter Master, and Felix Faust with Amazo as the umpire.

==== Super-Villains in other media ====
The concept of a heroes vs. villains game of baseball was adapted for Batman: The Brave and the Bold in "Triumvirate of Terror!", where the Legion of Doom faced the Justice League International. Therein, Lex Luthor, Joker, Cheetah, Weather Wizard, Clock King, Chronos, and Felix Faust made up the team, with Amazo as the umpire.

=== Superior Five ===
A homage to the Inferior Five, the Superior Five are Jongleur, Splitshot, Lagomorph, Hindenberg, and Tremor.

=== The Syndicate ===
The extraterrestrial crime cartel known as the Syndicate was a loose alliance of alien interests operating on Earth. Known members included drug dealer Byth Rok and smuggler Kanjar Ro. The Syndicate's operations were highlighted during the Crime lord/Syndicate War a storyline which ran through the titles Darkstars #32 (March 1995), Deathstroke #48–50 (June–August 1995), and The New Titans #122 (June 1995). The Crime lord was eventually revealed to be Steve Dayton and the Syndicate was crushed by a collection of Earth's heroes including Extreme Justice, the Outsiders, and the Blood Pack.

=== S.Y.S.T.E.M. ===
An international organization dedicated to world control, S.Y.S.T.E.M. is made up of independent interconnected cells with soldiers known as SYSTEMatics. Known members include Grandmother, Amber Leader Mom, Onslaught, Agent Scar, Smart, Indigo Leader Edwin Alva, Chewie, Rose, Milton St. Cloud, Sloan, and Thomas Walsh.

== T ==
=== Tala and Tannarak ===
The Phantom Stranger's greatest foes, Tala and Tannarak fought their enemy multiple times separately and, on one occasion, each other before inevitably aligning only to suffer defeat again.

=== Tao's Criminal Organization ===
The criminal organization of Tao includes the Prodigals, Torpedoes, Blackguards, and Quislings. One of the top units is the Hounds.

=== Tartarus ===
Tartarus is a villain organization established by Vandal Savage in his plot to destroy the Teen Titans. Its known members include Cheshire, Gorilla Grodd, Lady Vic, Red Panzer, and Siren.

=== Team Penguin ===
Existing in The Batman universe, Team Penguin was assembled by the Penguin and included Killer Croc, Rag Doll, Firefly, and Killer Moth.

=== Temperature Twins ===
The team of Captain Cold and Heat Wave, the Temperature Twins aligned to battle the Flash.

==== Temperature Twins in other media ====
The Temperature Twins appear in The Flash and Legends of Tomorrow.

=== Temple of the Divine Light ===
A cult worshipping Eclipso, the Temple of the Divine Light was led by Lycaon.

=== Third Army ===
In the wake of perceived failures of the Manhunters and Green Lantern Corps (as the Halla's are seemingly retconned), the Guardians of the Universe develop the Third Army: a virus that infects organic lifeforms and turns them into emotionless cybernetic peacekeepers.

=== Three Faces of Evil ===
Pre-Crisis, Evil was an entity that fought the Marvel Family that could split into three beings called the Three Faces of Evil: Terror, Sin, and Wickedness. Post-Crisis, however, they were three separate beings by the same name.

=== Time Foes ===
A team of time-themed super-villains consisting of Chronos, Time Commander, Clock King, and Calendar Man.

=== Time Stealers ===
An organization formed by Mister Mind in opposition of the Time Master Rip Hunter, the Time Stealers consisted of Despero, Per Degaton, Supernova, Ultra-Humanite, Black Beetle, and Rex Hunter.

=== Tri-Ad ===
Also known as the Troika, the Tri-Ad worked for the Cabal and counted Attica, H.A.R.M., and Slag as members.

==== Tri-Ad in other media ====
The Tri-Ad appear in Wild C.A.T.s.

=== Triarch of Maltus ===
Deities once worshipped on Maltus, the Triarch of Maltus were Lord Daalon, Quarra, Archor, and Tzodar.

=== Two-Face's gang ===
When going up against the Teen Titans, Two-Face assembled a trio of twins with incredible abilities or equipment. These three sets of twins were Flamesplasher, Darklight, and Sizematic. The Sizematic twins later joined the Secret Society of Super Villains.

== U ==
=== Ultravixens ===
A group of female aliens who tried to rape Mr. Majestic. Its members include Pure Candi, Starina Wave, Ravin, Redd, Acidia, and Sprite.

=== United Underworld ===
In Batman (1966), United Underworld was an alliance between the Joker, Penguin, Catwoman, and the Riddler to take over the world by kidnapping the United World Organization's Security Council.

=== Untouchables ===
A trio of bank robbers who adopted costumes of the 1920s, the Untouchables used technology to become immaterial and battled the likes of Superman, Robin, Elongated Man, Looker, and Hawk and Dove. Originally, they called themselves the Intangibles.

=== Uranium and Agantha ===
One of the first Metal Men constructed by Doc Magnus, Uranium was shut down only to later revive. Seeking vengeance, he built a partner in Agantha and the pair destroyed the Metal Men and made Magnus their slave. The intervention of the Atom prevented the duo from inflicting a death ray onto the world.

== V ==
=== Van'n Imperium ===
After gaining the power of the Green Lantern power ring, Magaan Van'n Intraktus reclaimed his world under a tyrannical regime called the Van'n Imperium. When Kyle Rayner's New Green Lantern Corps battled the corrupt Lantern, Intraktus orchestrated the destruction of his planet.

=== Vandal Savage's gang ===
When the Justice League emerged, Vandal Savage assembled Clayface, Solomon Grundy, Eclipso, and the Thorn to destroy them.

=== Veil ===
An American-based xenophobic anti-alien organization, the Veil is led by several influential industrialists and politicians, but was secretly founded by Pylon, an agent of the alien H'San Natall. The Veil used mercenaries such as Dark Nemesis and Deathstroke to attack the Teen Titans. The organization was later disbanded due to the efforts of the Teen Titans. First appears in Teen Titans (vol. 2) #3 (December 1996).

=== Vendetta ===
An assemblage of the Freedom Brigade's greatest foes, Vendetta was founded by Masked Swastika with Man-Mountain, Silver Sorceress, Sparrow, and Speed Demon.

=== Vimanian Bestiary ===
Servants of Lord Vimana, the Vimanian Bestiary included Kohli, Gargol, Tauran, and Mahduse.

== W ==
=== Walker Brothers ===
A quartet of brothers able to manipulate the neurochemistry of their victims, the Walker Brothers are Alan, Buzz, Deke, and Neil.

=== Warguard ===
When a comet passed over the Monitor One satellite, its radiation killed most of those aboard. However, those that survived were empowered but driven completely insane. Isaiah King of Team One was stationed there and become transformed into Despot who lead his other survivors into becoming the Warguard. Its ranks included Hexon, Judgment, Nychus, Doreen Robinson, Stricture, and Talos.

=== Weaver's elementals ===
Weaver transformed three people into his elementals Hydra, Pyro, and Hurricane.

=== White Triangle ===
A Daxamite supremacist organization, the White Triangle believed other races to be inferior and interaction with them to be unclean.

=== Wonderland Gang ===
The Wonderland Gang is a group of criminals that are themed after characters from Alice's Adventures in Wonderland and Through the Looking-Glass. The group was organized by Tweedledum and Tweedledee and consisted of March Harriet, Walrus, Carpenter, Lion, and Unicorn. Tweedledum and Tweedledee use Mad Hatter's mind-control technology on him so that he would be their puppet leader of the Wonderland Gang. The Wonderland Gang commit various gimmicky heists before Batman deduces the Tweeds to be the true masterminds. Once the three are returned to Arkham Asylum, Mad Hatter quickly exacts revenge on the two, manipulating them into a bloody brawl with his mind control chips.

In "DC Rebirth", another incarnation of the Wonderland Gang appears, consisting of Mad Hatter, Tweedledum and Tweedledee, White Rabbit, March Harriet, Walrus, and Carpenter.

==== Wonderland Gang in other media ====
A variation of the Wonderland Gang appears in Batwoman. This version is led by Alice, ex-Crows member Chuck Dodgson, and Jonathan Cartwright, while its minions wear masks that resemble the March Hare and the Cheshire Cat.

=== World Public Enemy ===
A trio of female musicians turned criminals, World Public Enemy featured Dragon Fly, Silken Spider, and Tiger Moth.

=== Worldkillers ===
Biological weapons developed on Krypton, the Worldkillers included Reign, Deimax, Flower of Heaven, and Perrilus.

==== Worldkillers in other media ====
The Worldkillers appear in the third season of Supergirl. The group consists of Reign, Pestilence and Purity, biological weapons created by the group of Kryptonians called the Worldkiller Coven.

=== Wurstwaffe ===
A sausage-based gang, the Wurstwaffe were Knockwurst, Bratwurst, Blutwurst, Leberwurst, and Weisswurst.

== Y ==
=== Young Offenders ===
The evil Teen Titans equivalent in the Antimatter Universe.

== Z ==
=== Zithertech-Tech ===
Responsible in part for the outbreak of the Nuclear Men around the world from the creation of the Firestorm matrix, Zithertech-Tech saw its founder Roger Zither turned into the monstrous Helix while his wife Candace tried to cover-up their company's involvement using the hit squad Hyena Team.

== See also ==
- List of criminal organizations in comics
- List of government agencies in DC Comics
- List of teams and organizations in DC Comics
