= Effigy (comics) =

Effigy, in comics, may refer to:

- Effigy (DC Comics)
- Effigy (Marvel Comics)

== See also ==
- Effigy (disambiguation)
