= Chronos (character) =

- Chronos as depicted in Blue Beetle (vol. 6) #9 (February 1987). Art by Paris Cullins and Dell Barras.

Publication information
- Publisher: DC Comics
- First appearance: Clinton: The Atom #3 (November 1962); Gabriel: Chronos #1 (March 1998)
- Created by: Clinton: Gardner Fox; Gil Kane; Gabriel: John Francis Moore; Paul Guinan

In-story information
- Alter ego: David Clinton; Walker Gabriel
- Team affiliations: Clinton: Anti-Justice League; Secret Society of Super Villains; Suicide Squad; Injustice Gang; Injustice League; Crime Champions; Time Foes; A.R.G.U.S. Time Masters
- Notable aliases: Clinton: The Time Thief
- Abilities: Genius-level intellect; Skilled hand-to-hand combatant; Expert thief; Use of high-tech gadgets; Time travel

Chronos is the name of several supervillains appearing in American comic books published by DC Comics. These characters take their name from the Greek personification of time and have the ability to time travel. He is the archenemy of the Atom.

== Publication history ==
The David Clinton version of Chronos first appeared in The Atom #3 and was created by Gardner Fox and Gil Kane. In 1974, Chronos was a founding member of the Injustice Gang.

The Walker Gabriel version of Chronos first appeared in Chronos #1 and was created by John Francis Moore and Paul Guinan.

== Fictional character biography ==
=== David Clinton ===
The archenemy of the Atom, David Clinton is a petty thief who attributes his consistent incarceration to his lack of timing. To improve his timing, he studies the rhythm of time pieces and by practice learns to synchronize each of his actions with the beat of the prison clock. By the end of his prison sentence, Clinton develops an extraordinary sense of timing which he resolved to use to further his criminal career as Chronos.

Chronos comes close to deducing the Atom's secret identity when he realizes that Atom attacked him soon after Ray Palmer saw him. He succeeds in capturing the Atom and placing him inside a watch, which Atom escapes from. Chronos next tries to steal a collection of historic Hungarian clocks which each had a gem hidden inside, but is again defeated. Over time, Chronos develops a variety of time-based weapons.

In pre-Crisis continuity, Chronos is a member of the Crime Champions, an alliance of villains from Earth-One and Earth-Two. When the Earth-Two Crime Champions impersonate the Earth-One Crime Champions, Icicle impersonates Chronos with the help of Wizard's magic, and battles Batman, Wonder Woman and Green Lantern. On Earth-Two, Chronos tries to steal a rare clock from a lighthouse and uses his vibratory watch to put Aquaman into a coma, but Superman revives Aquaman and captures Chronos, crushing his watch. The JLA and JSA are captured again and magically placed in cages in space, but with the aid of the Green Lanterns escape and return to Earth. Chronos tries to help the Fiddler find an Earth-3 with his chronological knowledge, but is defeated by Martian Manhunter and Black Canary.

Chronos eventually stops stealing for his own gain and begins doing so to finance his time research. He begins battling Blue Beetle (Ted Kord), with the Atom having retired to live in the Amazon. During a battle with Kord, Chronos is transported 100 million years into the past. Upon returning to the present, Chronos uses his technology to manipulate the stock markets and amass a fortune. Chronos's illegal endeavors were discovered and he was returned to prison. He was freed by the Calendar Man to work with the Time Foes, but is captured by the Teen Titans. Out of desperation and humiliation, Chronos accepts an offer from the demon Neron and exchanged his soul for the metahuman ability to manipulate time. However, Chronos discovers that his abilities accelerated his aging with each use, which end up apparently killing him.

In The All-New Atom #12, the Anagram guy who has been testing and helping Atom (Ryan Choi) is revealed to be Chronos. In issue #20, he is revealed as the mastermind behind the strange occurrences surrounding Ivy Town, aiming to destroy everything that Ray Palmer loved.

Post-Flashpoint, David Clinton is an agent of A.R.G.U.S. who specializes in time travel. He was tasked with finding Booster Gold; however, he had apparently failed his mission and was captured by the Outsider. Green Arrow discovers him as a captive while pursuing Professor Ivo. Ivo states that the engine that Chronos is stuck in is activated. Chronos causes a temporal neutral field to envelop the manor, causing it to freeze in place throughout time, while the Earth turns - which means that the Earth moves, not the manor. Chronos is eventually rescued by the Justice League.

=== Walker Gabriel ===
Chronos #1 (March 1998). Art by Paul Guinan.

Walker Gabriel got possession of Clinton's research after his death. He became the second Chronos and was the lead character of a short-lived comic book series published by DC Comics, acting as both a hero and a criminal depending on circumstances, and often running afoul of the Linear Men. He was eventually revealed to be the son of a temporal theorist who had worked with Clinton and created Chronopolis, a city beyond time. The series ran for 12 issues (including a DC One Million crossover numbered 1,000,000) between March 1998 and February 1999, and concluded with Gabriel wiping himself from history, to save his mother's life. The nature of Chronopolis, however, meant he still existed despite not being born. Still, due to an unclear series of events, it appeared in fact two Walker Gabriels existed: one outside of time, one within it, but only up to the point when he removed himself out of it. After that, the timeline streamlined and only the time-traveling Chronos remained. Gabriel had many encounters with members of the Linear Men and also met Destiny of the Endless during this series.

== Powers and abilities ==
Chronos possesses genius-level intellect and is an expert in hand-to-hand combat.

=== Equipment ===
Chronos makes use of clock-themed devices.

== In other media ==
=== Television ===
- The David Clinton incarnation of Chronos appears in the Justice League Unlimited two-part episode "The Once and Future Thing", voiced by Peter MacNicol. This version is a meek physics professor from the future era depicted in Batman Beyond who despite being ostracized by his peers for his theories on time travel, secretly created a time travel belt. Wishing to avoid time paradoxes, he travels through time to collect past artifacts at the points where they would no longer be missed amidst disapproval from his wife, Enid Clinton, who feels he should be using his belt to improve their lives. However, he attracts the attention of Batman, Wonder Woman, and Green Lantern when he travels to the present to steal one of Batman's utility belts. As the heroes pursue David through time, he grows increasingly unstable and power-hungry and starts calling himself Chronos. With help from Enid, the remaining heroes confront David, but he attempts to escape to the beginning of time and rewrite history to make himself a god. Nonetheless, Batman and Green Lantern catch up to him and place a disk into David's belt that undoes his actions and traps him in a time loop of his last argument with Enid before he began time-traveling.
- The David Clinton incarnation of Chronos appears in the Batman: The Brave and the Bold episode "Sword of the Atom!".
- An original incarnation of Chronos appears in the first season of Legends of Tomorrow, portrayed by Dominic Purcell and Jordan Davis and voiced by Steve Blum. This version is a temporal bounty hunter employed by the Time Masters to capture former member Rip Hunter, who went rogue and formed the Legends to stop Vandal Savage. After several encounters, the Legends unmask Chronos as an older version of Mick Rory / Heat Wave, whom the Time Masters brainwashed to help them track the Legends. The Legends eventually defeat, capture, and successfully rehabilitate Rory.
- The David Clinton incarnation of Chronos appears in Justice League Action, voiced by Andy Richter.

=== Miscellaneous ===
- An unidentified Chronos appears in Super Friends #22.
- An unidentified Chronos appears in Justice League Adventures. A future version of Chronos convinces the Justice League to release his present self from prison after showing them a recording of the former's version of Superman confirming that Chronos has reformed. The Flash and the Atom later learn that Chronos traveled back in time to prevent the death of his brother Bobby, only to threaten the timestream after creating multiple versions of himself over several repeated attempts to change history. In response, the heroes bring Bobby to the present to help Chronos come to terms with his death. After being returned to prison, Chronos is visited by a woman claiming to be his future daughter, who assures him that things will eventually be all right.
