= Shaggy Man (comics) =

- The Shaggy Man as depicted in Justice League of America #45 (June 1966). Art by Mike Sekowsky.

Publication information
- Publisher: DC Comics
- First appearance: Justice League of America #45 (June 1966)
- Created by: Gardner Fox (scripts); Mike Sekowsky (pencils)

In-story information
- Abilities: Superhuman strength and stamina; Invulnerability; Healing factor; Enhanced sense of smell; Reactive adaptation; Immortality

Shaggy Man is the name of several fictional characters appearing in comic books published by DC Comics. Most of the Shaggy Men are depicted as artificial lifeforms with regenerating abilities and have been created by different people.

== Publication history ==
The Shaggy Man debuted in Justice League of America #45 (June 1966) and was created by writer Gardner Fox and artist Mike Sekowsky. That story also introduced a second Shaggy Man created to combat the first. The original Shaggy Man returned in Justice League of America #104 (Feb. 1973). Its body returned in JLA #24 - 26 (Dec. 1998 - Feb. 1999) and was updated and rechristened "the General" after General Wade Eiling transplanted his mind into it. The General reappeared in the "World War III" storyline JLA #36 - 41 (Dec. 1999 - May 2000).

The second character reappeared in a one-shot story in Justice League of America #186 (Jan. 1981) and in Crisis on Infinite Earths #9-10 (Dec. 1985-Jan. 1986).

A Shaggy Man created by Lex Luthor debuted in Justice League of America Wedding Special (Nov. 2007), the first chapter of a storyline that continued in Justice League of America #13-15 (Nov. 2007 - Jan. 2008).

A Shaggy Man created by Professor Ivo debuted in Justice League of America Vol. 3 #4. He later returned as a tool of Black Manta and N.E.M.O. in Aquaman: Rebirth #8-9 (2016).

Writer Mike Conroy noted that the Shaggy Man was "a mountainous cross between Frankenstein's monster and the Sasquatch".

== Fictional character biographies ==
=== First Shaggy Man ===
The Shaggy Man is the creation of Professor Andrew Zagarian, a scientist who invented "plastalloy", a synthetic human tissue substitute similar to plastic that can be used for organ transplants. Zagarian built the Shaggy Man by splicing the plastalloy with salamander DNA. Following a power surge, the Shaggy Man is transformed into a hulking, hairy creature that can rapidly regenerate. Essentially mindless, the Shaggy Man attacks anything that moves. Justice League members Green Arrow and Hawkman attempt to stop the creature, but the Shaggy Man holds them all off until the Flash suggests that Zagarian create a second creature to fight the first. The League sealed the two monsters inside a deep pit that Flash dug to also contain the Moon Creature the other Justice League members were fighting. Once the Shaggy Men defeated the Moon Creature, they could battle each other indefinitely.

Shaggy Man is eventually freed by villain Hector Hammond and transported to the JLA satellite; Green Lantern uses his power ring to shrink the monster to miniature size and imprison it.

After Professor Zagarian was imprisoned for causing the original Shaggy Man incident in this untold story, Shaggy Man went on a rampage in Arizona. Zagarian was visited by Flash and informs him that Shaggy Man's powers are tied to photosynthesis. As this came from Shaggy Man's fur, the Justice League shaved off Shaggy Man's fur and stranded Shaggy Man on the dark side of the Moon.

At some point during the Post-Crisis, Shaggy Man returned to Earth and was found to have been imprisoned in Atlantis by Aquaman during Green Lantern's visit to Atlantis. Shaggy Man's inert body is eventually recovered from the depths of the ocean by General Wade Eiling and his Ultramarine Corps. Diagnosed with an inoperable brain tumor, Eiling transfers his mind into the creature's body, shaves his hair, and refers to himself as the "General".

=== Second Shaggy Man ===
At Flash's suggestion, Professor Andrew Zagarian created a second Shaggy Man to fight the first Shaggy Man. The Justice League sealed both Shaggy Men in a pit where they could fight each other. It was brought to life after it was placed in the pit. When the Shaggy Men defeated the moon creature that was sealed with it, they proceeded to fight each other.

After getting free, Shaggy Man is later discovered to be rampaging across Russia and is finally tricked by Batman and, via a rocket, is sent into outer space.

Shaggy Man returns during the "Crisis on Infinite Earths" storyline, where he is among the villains united under Brainiac. When on Earth-X, Shaggy Man fought Mento and Changeling. He is apparently destroyed by Green Arrow of Earth-Two with an explosive arrow. Green Arrow observes that since Shaggy Man is not really alive, he has no problem using lethal methods.

=== Lex Luthor's Shaggy Man ===
A new version of Shaggy Man appears as a member of the Injustice League. Shaggy Man joins Gorilla Grodd in assaulting the hero Geo-Force. Lex Luthor revealed that he created this Shaggy Man and states that he does not usually let it out except for when it is time for some exercising. Wonder Woman fought Shaggy Man during the fight against the Injustice League.

During the holiday season, Green Lantern and Red Arrow thwart Shaggy Man's rampage at a Christmas parade. Red Arrow shoots Shaggy Man with a tranquilizer arrow loaded with 1500CCs, leaving him in a docile state. Not wanting to hand Shaggy Man over to S.T.A.R. Labs, Green Lantern and Red Arrow take him to the Justice League's Christmas party. When Shaggy Man comes out of his daze, the Justice League appease him with a teddy bear.

=== Java ===
During the "Brightest Day" storyline, Simon Stagg performed an unknown experiment that enabled Java to transform into a Shaggy Man. He is later defeated by Stagg's former minion Freight Train, who had defected to the Outsiders.

=== Professor Ivo's Shaggy Man ===
In 2011, "The New 52" rebooted the DC universe. A Shaggy Man appeared as a member of the Secret Society of Super Villains. Created by Professor Ivo, this version is a creature wearing a furry humanoid costume over its robotic body. After it was revealed that Catwoman was actually Martian Manhunter in disguise, Shaggy Man fought the Justice League of America, only to be defeated by Stargirl.

In 2016, DC Comics implemented another relaunch of its books called "DC Rebirth" which restored its continuity to a form much as it was prior to "The New 52". This Shaggy Man reappears as a pawn of villain Black Manta. After a brutal battle, Aquaman finally defeats the creature by attaching his Justice League membership card to the Shaggy Man and ordering the Justice League satellite to transport it beyond Earth's orbit.

In a flashback, Shaggy Man's rampage in St. Louis where it fought the Justice League led to an unnamed man getting paralyzed from the waist down. This led to the man becoming the obsessive supervillain Fan.

Shaggy Man is later shown to be an inmate of Monster Rock alongside several other monsters. He is among the monsters who fell under the control of the sorceress Echidna. Damage and Congorilla defeat Echidna, freeing the monsters from her control.

During the "Dark Crisis" storyline, Shaggy Man appears as a member of Deathstroke's Secret Society of Super Villains and joins the group in a memorial for the presumed deceased Justice League members. Shaggy Man is among the villains who are possessed by the Great Darkness and recruited into Pariah's Dark Army, with Shaggy Man battling Wonder Girl.

== Powers and abilities ==
The Shaggy Man possesses superhuman strength and durability, can regenerate rapidly, and does not need sustenance or rest. Due to its synthetic physiology, it can adapt to harsh environments and does not age.

Professor Ivo's Shaggy Man is a fur-coated robot who can adapt instantaneously to counter its opponents.

== Other versions ==
A Bizarro World counterpart of Shaggy Man appears in DC Comics Presents #71.

== In other media ==
=== Television ===
- A Shaggy Man makes non-speaking cameo appearances in Batman: The Brave and the Bold.
- A Shaggy Man appears in the DC Super Hero Girls episode "#FightAtTheMuseum", voiced by Jason Spisak.
- A Shaggy Man makes a non-speaking cameo appearance in the Creature Commandos episode "Cheers to the Tin Man" as an inmate of Belle Reve Penitentiary's Non-Human Division.

=== Video games ===
A Shaggy Man appears as a character summon in Scribblenauts Unmasked: A DC Comics Adventure.

=== Miscellaneous ===
Shaggy Man appears in DC Super Friends #20.

== See also ==
- Xemnu - A similar Marvel Comics monstrous villain
