= Zebra-Man =

Zebra-Man is the name of four fictional characters appearing in American comic books published by DC Comics.

== Publication history ==
Jacob Baker first appeared in Detective Comics #275 (Jan 1960) and was created by Bill Finger and Sheldon Moldoff.

Kobra's Zebra-Man first appeared in Outsiders #21 and was created by Mike W. Barr.

== Fictional character biography ==
=== Jacob Baker ===
Zebra-Man

Publication information
- Publisher: DC Comics
- First appearance: Detective Comics #275 (1960)
- Created by: Bill Finger (writer); Sheldon Moldoff (artist)

In-story information
- Alter ego: Jacob Baker
- Species: Metahuman
- Abilities: Can magnetize anything

Jacob Baker is a high-tech scientist whose machinery irradiated his body, giving him the ability to attract and repel anything besides metal (referred to as "Diamagnetism"). He takes the name Zebra-Man, derived from the stripes covering his body. During his first fight with Zebra-Man, Batman is accidentally irradiated by the same energy and left unable to control his powers. Batman attracts Zebra-Man to himself and takes him to the Gotham City Police Department.

=== Kobra's Zebra-Man ===
Zebra-Man

Publication information
- Publisher: DC Comics
- First appearance: Outsiders #21 (1987)
- Created by: Mike W. Barr

In-story information
- Alter ego: Unknown
- Species: Metahuman
- Team affiliations: Strike Force Kobra; Secret Society of Super Villains
- Abilities: Can magnetize anything

When Kobra researches the origins of some of Batman's enemies and creates a strike-force called Strike Force Kobra to usurp Stagg Enterprises in his goal of world domination, one of the villains he creates is patterned after the original Zebra-Man. This version lacks the aura of the first Zebra-Man and has a mohawk that evokes the image of his equine namesake. Zebra-Man, alongside the other Strike Force Kobra members, fights the Outsiders to a draw, but Zebra-Man escapes with Elemental Woman, Planet Master, Lady Eve, and Kobra. His colleague Spectrumonster does not survive the battle while Clayface escapes.

Zebra-Man appears as a member of Alexander Luthor Jr.'s Secret Society of Super Villains during the Battle of Metropolis alongside his Strike Force Kobra teammates Planet Master and Spectrumonster.

=== Vortex ===
Vortex

Publication information
- Publisher: DC Comics
- First appearance: Batman: The Dark Knight (vol. 2) #1 (2011)
- Created by: Paul Jenkins (writer); David Finch (artist)

In-story information
- Alter ego: Unknown
- Species: Metahuman
- Notable aliases: Zebra Man
- Abilities: Can magnetize anything

In 2011, The New 52 rebooted the DC Universe. A version of Zebra-Man first appears as an inmate of Arkham Asylum, currently going by the moniker "Vortex". He is one of the many prisoners attempting to escape in a massive breakout attempt, which is stopped by Batman. He later appears attempting to help Catwoman escape her incarceration in the asylum, but is physically beaten by her.

Vortex appears in the DC Rebirth reboot, renamed Zebra Man. This version sports short hair with black leather gloves, boots, and shorts. Zebra Man is one of the many villains taken down by Batman and Catwoman after he takes her along with him on an average night of his job.

In Doomsday Clock, Vortex is seen as an inmate at Arkham Asylum at the time when Batman incarcerated Rorschach there. He protects Rorschach from the other inmates.

Vortex is later seen in Zambia partaking in a card game with Fiddler, Psych, and Shrike. When Psych learns that Fiddler has cheated, Fiddler is held at gunpoint only for Psych to kill the three villains with the projections of the people they killed.

=== Menagerie's Zebra-Man ===
During the "Forever Evil" storyline, a different Zebra-Man appears as a member of Cheetah's Menagerie. He is among those frozen by Killer Frost.

Zebra-Man later join an Anti-Task Force X group called The Revolutionaries before joining the Suicide Squad under their new supervisor Lok.

== Powers and abilities ==
The first two incarnations of Zebra-Man possess "diamagnetism" which enables them to attract or repel all matter besides metal. Both use an inhibitor belt to control their abilities.

== In other media ==
- The Jacob Baker incarnation of Zebra-Man makes non-speaking appearances in Batman: The Brave and the Bold. This version's powers can affect metal.
- The second incarnation of Zebra-Man appears in The Lego Batman Movie.
- The Jacob Baker incarnation of Zebra-Man appears in Scooby-Doo! & Batman: The Brave and the Bold.

== See also ==
- List of Batman family enemies
