= Effigy (disambiguation) =

An effigy is a representation of a person.

Effigy may also refer to:

- Effigy (group), An Australian indie-pop group in the 1990s
- Effigy (DC Comics), a DC Comics supervillain
- Effigy (Dungeons & Dragons), an undead creature in Dungeons & Dragons
- Effigy (Marvel Comics), a fictional character in the Marvel Comics universe
- Effigy (album), a 2003 album by Nomy Lamm
- "Effigy", a song by Creedence Clearwater Revival from the album Willy and the Poor Boys
- "Effigy", a song by Andrew Bird from the album Noble Beast
- "Effigy", a song by Converge from the album Axe to Fall
- "Effigy", a song by Seether from Holding onto Strings Better Left to Fray
- "Effigy (I'm Not an)", a song by Ministry from With Sympathy
- "Effigy", a song by Clutch from the album Transnational Speedway League
- Lady Effigie, a character in the 1966 film Munster, Go Home!, Herman Munster's adopted Aunt
- The Effigies, a punk rock band from Chicago, Illinois
- Tomb effigy, a sculpted figure on a tomb monument depicting the deceased

== See also ==
- Efígie da República
