= General Wade Eiling =

DC Comics villain

- General Wade Eiling as depicted in Who's Who Update '88 #4 (January 1995). Art by Pat Broderick.

Publication information
- Publisher: DC Comics
- First appearance: Captain Atom #1 (March 1987)
- Created by: Cary Bates; Pat Broderick

In-story information
- Alter ego: Wade Eiling
- Team affiliations: Suicide Squad; The Society; Injustice Gang; United States Army
- Notable aliases: The General; Shaggy Man
- Abilities: Superhuman strength, stamina, durability, speed, and sense of smell; Regeneration; Military expertise

General Wade Eiling, sometimes known as The General, is a fictional character appearing in American comic books published by DC Comics. He is a prominent military general who contributed to Nathaniel Adam's transformation into Captain Atom and later becomes a supervillain after transferring his brain into Shaggy Man's body.

Eiling appears in The Flash, portrayed by Clancy Brown, and Justice League Unlimited, voiced by J. K. Simmons. In the latter series, he is a member of Project Cadmus who later transforms into a monstrous form reminiscent of Shaggy Man using a World War II-era super-serum.

== Publication history ==
Wade Eiling first appeared in Captain Atom #1 (March 1987) and was created by Cary Bates and Pat Broderick. The character is loosely based on General Eining, Captain Allen Adam's superior officer from the original Charlton Comics Captain Atom series.

== Fictional character biography ==
Wade Eiling is a military tactician who blackmails the accused Nathaniel Adam into participating in the atomic experiment that turns Nathaniel into the nuclear being Captain Atom, and causes him to disappear for 18 years. This is considered a failure by Eiling and Heinrich Megala, the project's main scientist. They would attempt the experiment again, which ends up creating Major Force.

During the 18 years in which Adam is gone, Eiling marries Adam's wife and acts as father to his two children. Eiling also manipulates Captain Atom into serving the military. His first attempts, a chance for Adam to view his children in exchange for retrieving a lost submarine, falls apart and embarrasses Eiling in front of his superiors. His continuing conflicts with the title character were a major focus of the 1980s Captain Atom series. Eiling would also form an intensely adversarial relationship with Megala.

In JLA #24 after being diagnosed with an inoperable brain tumor, Eiling sends a military team to salvage the indestructible body of the first Shaggy Man from the Pacific Ocean. From his base of operations, the Threshold, Eiling orchestrates a military assault on the JLA. Spearheading the offensive is a new superhero team called the Ultramarine Corps. Recruited and genetically enhanced by Eiling's lab team, The Ultramarines already exhibit signs of terminal illness. Meanwhile, Batman, Huntress, and Plastic Man track Eiling to Threshold and discover Eiling's dead body. In addition, they also find that he transferred his consciousness into the indestructible body of the shaved Shaggy Man and became known as the General.

The JLA battle the military and the Ultramarine Corps until JLA #26 (February 1999). General's forces consider mutiny as doubts against attacking the League come to a head. Superman, whose super-senses have diagnosed the Ultramarine's disease, persuades the Ultramarine Corps that General has used and betrayed them. The Corps members, who volunteered for service in good faith, switch sides and assist the Justice League in attacking Threshold. The team forces the General onto a bulk-matter teleport platform, transporting him to the asteroid 433 Eros.

The General stays on the asteroid for several months until Queen Bee recruits him into Lex Luthor's Injustice Gang. General battles against the Justice League inside the Phantom Zone as part of a coordinated attack, intending to release weapons of mass destruction on Earth. Orion's war dog Sturmer sacrifices himself by tackling the General through a ship's airlock, trapping him in the Phantom Zone.

During the Infinite Crisis storyline, General is one of the hundreds of villains recruited into Alexander Luthor Jr.'s Secret Society of Super-Villains. He is a participant in the Battle of Metropolis, the unsuccessful first step of the Society's war on the heroes.

Eiling later joins the Suicide Squad. After Eiling betrays the team to their intended target, Rick Flag detonates a bomb implanted in his head. His head regenerates, but he is rendered amnesiac. Eiling continues to serve as a Squad member through the "Salvation Run" storyline, where he is exiled to a distant, Earth-like planet without a trial.

In September 2011, DC Comics engaged in a line-wide revision of its superhero comics, including their stories and characters' fictional histories, known as The New 52. In the new stories, the character of Captain Atom has a new origin with General Wade Eiling first appearing in a radiation suit while flanking Captain Atom. Eiling tells Captain Atom to fall in line as he is a super-weapon that will keep America on the top. Eiling also appears in the series The Fury of Firestorm: The Nuclear Men, where he opposes the eponymous hero.

== Powers and abilities ==
General Wade Eiling specializes in military warfare. As the General, Eiling possesses immense physical strength and is functionally immortal. He can regenerate his body rapidly and does not require food, water, or sleep to survive.

== Other versions ==
The General appears in JLA/Avengers #4 as a brainwashed minion of Krona.

== In other media ==
=== Television ===
- General Wade Eiling appears in Justice League Unlimited, voiced by J. K. Simmons. This version is an Air Force General and member of Project Cadmus who regards metahumans as a threat to humanity. Following Cadmus' disbandment, he is relegated to a "pencil pusher". Upon learning that his former superior Amanda Waller no longer considers the Justice League a threat, Eiling injects himself with Captain Nazi's super-soldier serum and transforms into a monster. He battles the Justice League before being convinced to surrender, but vows to return if the League becomes a threat.
- General Wade Eiling appears in Young Justice, voiced by Jeff Bennett.
- General Wade Eiling appears in The Flash, portrayed by Clancy Brown. This version is a U.S. Army major general who worked with S.T.A.R. Labs five years prior to the series to develop a means of creating psychic interrogators until Harrison Wells learned he was abusing the program's test subject Grodd and broke ties with him.
- General Wade Eiling makes a non-speaking cameo appearance in the My Adventures with Superman episode "Two Lanes Diverged".

=== Video games ===
General Wade Eiling as the General appears in the Nintendo DS version of Justice League Heroes.

=== Miscellaneous ===
- General Wade Eiling as the General appears in issue #5 of the Justice League Unlimited tie-in comic.
- General Wade Eiling appears in the Young Justice tie-in comic.

== Reception and analysis ==
The Slings & Arrows Comic Guide found that in the character of General Wade Eiling the comic had created "an appalling specimen of military pigheadedness who can justify every iniquitous piece of behaviour under the blanket of national security". The Supervillain Book summed up Eiling's character as an "immoral soldier".

According to George A. Gonzalez, the Justice League Unlimited incarnation of Eiling represents the negative side of "aggressive military policies of the 2000s" by the US government, like "wanton violence" and "fixation on 'power' (i.e. military force)". Through his deliberate transformation into "a huge, hideous, grayish monster with superpowers", Eiling "embodies the ugliness of militarism". Eiling also serves as an example of the development of comics over the decades: While in the 1940s and 50s comic heroes were "unabashed patriots", in the figure of General Eiling from the 2000s they fight against a representative of a misunderstood patriotism that values the reputation of the nation-state higher than the lives of any number of civilians.

Markus Engelns gives a different characterization of Eiling based on the World War III storyline, in a later stage in the character's development: Eiling no longer has his function as a general and has lost any discernable motive beyond fighting, which emphasizes his dangerous nature even more.
