= Planet Master =

Planet Master is the name of two fictional characters appearing in comics published by DC Comics. The first Planet Master, a scientist called Irving Norbert and his lab assistant, who would later take on the name and costume, first appeared in Detective Comics #296 in October 1961. The characters were created by writer Bill Finger and artist Jim Mooney.

== Fictional character biography ==
Planet Master

Publication information
- Publisher: DC Comics
- First appearance: Detective Comics #296 (October 1961)
- Created by: Bill Finger (writer); Jim Mooney (artist)

In-story information
- Alter ego: Professor Irving Norbert
- Species: Human
- Abilities: Use of planet-based weapons

Planet Master

Publication information
- Publisher: DC Comics
- First appearance: Outsiders #21 (July 1987)
- Created by: Mike W. Barr; Jim Aparo

In-story information
- Alter ego: Edward Burke
- Species: Metahuman
- Team affiliations: Strike Force Kobra; Secret Society of Super Villains
- Abilities: Simulation of the conditions typical to any of the nine planets of the Solar System

Professor Irving Norbert is a scientist who was exposed to the gases of a meteor. The result caused him to develop a split personality, with his alternate personality turning to a life of crime. Using his knowledge of astronomy, Norbert becomes a costumed villain named Planet Master, utilizing weapons based on the nine planets. He managed to outwit Batman and Robin in the first battle. Norbert's unscrupulous assistant Edward Burke discovers the double identity of his boss and decides to either join forces with Planet Master or to use his equipment on his own. Ultimately though, the effects of the gas wear off. Norbert's criminal self is erased and Batman brings Burke to justice.

=== Second Planet Master ===
When Kobra creates a strike-force called Strike Force Kobra to usurp Stagg Enterprises in his goal of world domination, one of the villains he recruits, Edward Burke, is patterned after the original Planet Master. This version is able to simulate the conditions of the other planets in the Solar System. He, alongside the other members of Strike Force Kobra, battles the Outsiders. Planet Master appears during the Infinite Crisis storyline as a member of Alexander Luthor Jr.'s Secret Society of Super Villains. He participates in the Battle of Metropolis alongside Strike Force Kobra teammates Zebra-Man and Spectrumonster.

== Powers and abilities ==
The first Planet Master uses weapons based on the planets.

The second Planet Master can simulate the conditions typical to any of the nine planets in the Solar System. For example, he can use the speed of Mercury, the heat of Mars, the strength of Jupiter, the rings of Saturn, and the cold of Pluto.

== In other media ==
- An amalgamated incarnation of Planet Master appears in Batman: The Brave and the Bold, voiced by Stephen Root. This version resembles Irving Norbert and possesses similar powers to the second Planet Master.
- Edward Burke appears in the Batman: Arkham Knight DLC "A Matter of Family" via audio tapes, voiced by JB Blanc. This version was a billionaire whose daughter was dying of cancer. He was approached by Dr. Penelope Young, Dr. Harleen Quinzel, and the Joker under the alias of Jack White, who claimed they would cure her while Burke built the Seaside Amusement Park as a favor to White, though Burke's daughter died anyway. Devastated, Burke gave ownership of the park to White and was driven to suicide, unaware that the pills he used were laced with Joker venom.

== See also ==
- List of Batman family enemies
