= Tracer (DC Comics) =

- The Earth-8 incarnation of Tracer as depicted in Lord Havok and the Extremists #3 (February 2008). Art by Mark Robinson.

Publication information
- Publisher: DC Comics
- First appearance: Justice League Europe #16 (July 1990)
- Created by: Keith Giffen (writer); Gerard Jones (writer); Bart Sears (artist)

In-story information
- Full name: Vincent Cade
- Team affiliations: Extremists
- Abilities: Superhuman physical abilities and senses; Powerful claws; Healing factor

Tracer is the name of two supervillains published by DC Comics. He first appeared in Justice League Europe #16 (July 1990), and was created by Keith Giffen, Gerard Jones, and Bart Sears. Like the rest of the Extremists, he is based on a Marvel Comics villain, in his case Sabretooth, the archenemy of Wolverine.

== Fictional character biography ==
=== Tracer ===
The first Tracer is a supervillain from Angor, an otherdimensional counterpart of Earth. The Extremists wiped out Angor in a nuclear explosion, leaving only themselves and a few heroes who fled to Earth. The Extremists pursued them and it was revealed that all but one of them had died and the surviving one, Dreamslayer, used android duplicates of his comrades, including Tracer. The androids are deactivated and stored in the Watchtower.

=== Tracer Robot ===
The second Tracer is a robotic duplicate of the first who was created by inventor Mitch Wacky on Angor as part of a theme park attraction. After the death of virtually all heroes and villains on the planet, Dreamslayer uses Wacky's robots to serve as replacements for the Extremists. The Extremists almost take over Earth, but are thwarted by Justice League Europe and placed on display in a wax museum in Paris.

The second Tracer is a robotic duplicate of the first who was created by inventor Mitch Wacky on Angor as part of a theme park attraction. It battles Justice League Europe before being defeated and exhibited in Madame Clouseau's Wax Museum in Paris. He is later used by Dreamslayer a second time on the island of Kooey Kooey Kooey, and still later as pawns of Twilight in a battle with Supergirl. The Tracer robot had all the powers of the original Tracer which included great strength, speed, and agility, enhanced senses and animal instincts.

=== Countdown ===
A third incarnation of Tracer appears in the Countdown to Final Crisis tie-in series Lord Havok and the Extremists. This version is Vincent Cade, a soldier who was injured after a failed attempt to desert his post. Cade is taken in by the government, given superpowers, and subjected to violent imagery and subliminal audio to manipulate him into becoming a killer. Cade is freed by Lord Havok, who removes the chip that was being used to control him. Cade goes on to join the Extremists as a freelance assassin.

== Powers and abilities ==
Tracer possesses enhanced senses that make him an excellent tracker. He also possesses enhanced strength and agility, powerful claws, and a healing factor.

== In other media ==
Tracer makes minor non-speaking appearances in Justice League Unlimited.
