= Johnny Witts =

- Johnny Witts on the cover of Detective Comics #344 (October 1965)

Publication information
- Publisher: DC Comics
- First appearance: Detective Comics #344 (October 1965)
- Created by: Gardner Fox; Jack Schiff; John Broome

In-story information
- Alter ego: Johnny Witts
- Species: Human
- Notable aliases: The Swami
- Abilities: Is always one step ahead of his opponents; skilled in acrobatics

Johnny Witts, "the crime boss who is always one step ahead of Batman," is a supervillain in the DC Comics Universe. He first appeared in Detective Comics #344 (Oct. 1965). He is also known as the Swami.

== Fictional character biography ==
"Out of the dark recesses of Gotham City" came Johnny Witts, who, along with his mobsters, sought to prove he could outwit the Batman at every turn. Witts made his existence known through a cascading series of events. "Apple Alice," a kindly old woman who would routinely offer Batman and Robin apples, was acting strangely. It was later revealed that "Apple Alice" was really Flo Murcell, a woman who worked in Johnny Witts' mob, and Batman's suspicions were tailored by Witts himself in a plan that led Batman straight to the scheming mobster. As Batman dangled from a rope outside Johnny Witts' window, Witts told the Caped Crusader that he would always be one step ahead of him; indeed, one of Witts' gang was on the roof above, ready to cut Batman's rope. Batman eventually cornered Johnny Witts by tailing Flo Murcell to his hideout. Witts had anticipated this, having removed the tracer on Murcell early in the day, but still the police came. Batman had placed a tracer on himself as well. Johnny Witts was taken to prison, where he took solace in the fact that he knew exactly how he could have gotten out of that situation, though he arrived at the solution too late.

Johnny Witts appeared disguised as a new crime boss called the Swami who had the power to see when and how Batman would try to capture him. As the Swami, Johnny Witts set the Fearsome Foursome loose on Gotham City with carefully prepared crimes that would bring Batman to him. With Batman captured, the Swami revealed himself to be Johnny Witts, the "criminal who is always one step ahead of you." Johnny Witts left Batman to die in a complex trap. When Batman showed up soon afterwards alive, Witts was taken by surprise. He didn't bother to think ahead of Batman this time, because he thought Batman was dead. Johnny Witts was arrested once again.

Johnny returned alongside several other members of Batman's rogues gallery: Joker, Catwoman, Mad Hatter, Cluemaster, and Getaway Genius. These villains were called together by the Penguin, who plotted against a new crime syndicate from the West Coast who had come to town. The Penguin feared that if the newcomers defeated the Batman, they would come after other villains next. So, to save their own skins, they formed the Gangland Guardians and plotted to save the Batman from a series of traps behind the scenes. What the Penguin didn't know was that the time and location of the traps were "super-whispered" to him by another villain named Mister Esper. Once the Gangland Guardians had helped Batman bring in the crime syndicate, a path had been cleared for Johnny Witts to take another crack at Batman.

Johnny Witts would finally reemerge when he had disguised himself as Batman and hired a group of specialized criminals to masquerade as the rest of the Super Friends. The disguised criminals approached the Wonder Twins and asked them if they wanted to have lunch at Batman's place the following day, ultimately hoping to trail the pair's secret identities (whom Johnny Witts had uncovered) and uncover Batman's secret identity. Fortunately for the Wonder Twins, they noticed that Johnny Witts had platform shoes to make himself appear Batman's height. And so when Johnny Witts and his gang trailed the Wonder Twins' secret identities to a stately manor, they ended up attacking not Bruce Wayne, but Superman in disguise. After Witts was once again carried off to jail, the Wonder Twins' secret identities were revealed to have been played by Wendy and Marvin.

== See also ==
- List of Batman Family enemies
