= List of criminal organizations in comics =

The villainous or shadowy group and or organization is a long-standing trope in adventure fiction, from Professor Moriarty's band of villains, to the sinister Mole Men that bedeviled Superman in his 1951 television show. An incomplete list and history of the many criminal and terrorist organizations present in comic books is as follows:

== Dark Horse Comics ==
=== Individual Eleven ===
The Individual Eleven (or Particularist Eleven) is a fictional terrorist group dealt with by Public Security Section 9 from the Ghost in the Shell manga series. The Individual Eleven's motive for terror is an essay also entitled "The Individual Eleven", which was, in reality, a fake essay implanted with a computer virus that infected everyone who read it. The virus itself does not cause the members of the Individual Eleven to commit their acts of terror, it is their own political views which cause them to do so. The virus only seems to make them unwilling martyrs.

=== The Wallenquist Organization ===
The Wallenquist Organization is a criminal organization in the fictional universe of Frank Miller's Sin City. It is led by Herr Wallenquist, a German-American (though the name is actually Swedish) mobster shrouded in mystery. The organization has a broad base of criminal enterprise to its name, including drug smuggling, assassination, organ harvesting and human smuggling for the purpose of illegal adoption and slavery, as well as having many city officials on their payroll at one time or the other.

=== The Magliozzi Crime Family ===
The Magliozzi Crime Family control the Cosa Nostra in Sin City. Led by Don Giacco Magliozzi and based at the Magliozzi Mansion (located in Sacred Oaks), they were wiped out in Family Values.

== Shogakukan ==
=== Hwalbindang ===
The Hwalbindang is a criminal organization featured in the Korean anime and manhwa series Shin Angyo Onshi. The Hwalbindang is a seven-member group of powerful martial arts specialists who began working as bandits, taking money from the rich so that they could provide help for the poor. At some point their ideals become corrupted by a desire for vengeance harbored by their leader Hong Gildong. Despite being more powerful than him, half of the group died fighting Munsu, the Angyo Onshi (bearer of justice). The other half died fighting his sometimes ally Wonsul of the Formless Sword and Munsu's sworn enemy the mad sorcerer known as Aji Tae. With the exception of their leader Hong Gildong, the individual members of Hwalbindang are the most powerful in the Shin Angyo Onshi universe.

== VIZ Media ==
=== Akatsuki ===
The Akatsuki (meaning "Dawn" or "Daybreak") is a criminal organization featured in the Japanese anime and manga series Naruto. It is first introduced midway into the first part Naruto, and its members gain significance as the main antagonists during the second part Naruto Shippuuden. Despite being composed of only ten members, Akatsuki is arguably the most powerful organization in the Naruto universe. Each member of Akatsuki is an S-class criminal.
