= Effigy (DC Comics) =

Publication information
- Publisher: DC Comics
- First appearance: As Martyn Van Wyck: Green Lantern (vol. 3) #110 (March 1999); As Effigy: Green Lantern (vol. 3) #113 (June 1999)
- Created by: Ron Marz; Darryl Banks

In-story information
- Alter ego: Martyn Van Wyck
- Species: Metahuman
- Team affiliations: Injustice League; Secret Society of Super Villains
- Abilities: Fire generation and manipulation; Flight

Effigy (Martyn Van Wyck) is a supervillain appearing in media published by DC Comics, primarily as an enemy of Green Lantern.

== Fictional character biography ==
Martyn Van Wyck is a man from Seattle, Washington, who was raised by his alcoholic father following his mother's death. He aspires to become a musician, but is unable to find work.

Outside Seattle, Van Wyck is abducted by the Controllers, who experiment on him. Believing their experiments to have failed, the Controllers return Van Wyck to Earth with only vague memories of his encounter with them. Van Wyck is taken to a nearby emergency room, where doctors determine that nothing is wrong with him. However, his eyes have changed from blue to orange.

Van Wyck later discovers that he has gained pyrokinetic abilities. While confronting a truck driver, Van Wyck transforms, gaining pale skin and flaming hair. After talking with his girlfriend Trace, who describes the images he makes in fire as a burning effigy, Van Wyck takes the name Effigy and leaves Seattle, abandoning Trace.

After Effigy battles Green Lantern, the Controllers see that their experiments were successful. Despite Green Lantern's efforts, Effigy is captured by the Controllers, who continue their experiments. The Controllers alter Effigy's mind, making him a near-mindless drone, and force him to battle Green Lantern. Green Lantern defeats Effigy and leaves him adrift in space, reasoning that his powers will protect him. Effigy later returns to Earth, where he has a brief affair with Killer Frost.

In the One Year Later storyline, Effigy joins the Injustice League and Libra's Secret Society of Super Villains. In Final Crisis: Revelations, Effigy is killed by the Spectre, who melts him into sentient oil and places him in a lantern resembling a Green Lantern ring's power battery, where he burns to death. Effigy returns in the series Green Lantern Corps (2025), which reveals that he survived the Spectre's attack. However, he was trapped inside the lantern, which later disappeared before he managed to escape.

== Powers and abilities ==
Effigy possesses the ability to generate fire and create constructs from it. Additionally, he can fly and survive in the vacuum of space.
