= DC Universe =

Shared universe of the comic stories published by DC Comics

DCU
- Triptych cover from Dark Nights: Death Metal (2020), depicting various characters from the history of the DC Universe, including members of the Justice Society of America, Justice League, Teen Titans, Doom Patrol, New Gods, and Endless. Art by Gary Frank.
- Created by: DC Comics
- Original work: All Star Comics #3 (1940) (Note: The first story to show that characters introduced in separate stories exist in the same universe. New Fun Comics #1 (1935) was the first comic book issue published by National Comics Publications (DC Comics' predecessor). Moreover, New Fun #6 (1935) is the first comic issue to introduce a recurring character in the DC Universe, being Doctor Occult.)
- Owners: Warner Bros. Entertainment (Skydance)
- Years: 1938–present

Print publications
- Novels: List of novels
- Comics: List of comics
- Graphic novels: List of graphic novels

Films and television
- Films: DC Studios reboot universe DC Extended Universe; Superman film franchise Batman film franchise Flash film franchise Wonder Woman in other media Green Lantern in film Animated Original Movies; Animated Movie Universe; List of films based on DC Comics publications
- Short film: Showcase
- Television series: List of television series based on DC Comics publications Arrowverse
- Television specials: Blood Rush; Chronicles of Cisco: Entry 0419; Stretched Scenes; The New Original Wonder Woman
- Television films: List of television films

Games
- Video games: List of video games Injustice

Miscellaneous
- Toys: DC Universe; Classics; Lego DC
- Theme park attractions: Batman amusement parks Superman – Ride of Steel; Green Lantern; Six Flags Great Adventure; Coaster; First Flight; Justice League: Alien Invasion 3D; Lex Luthor: Drop of Doom; The Joker rides Six Flags Discovery Kingdom; Six Flags Mexico; S&S Worldwide; DC Comics Super Hero Adventures; DC Rivals HyperCoaster

Official website
- Official website

The DC Universe is a fictional shared universe where most stories in American comic book titles published by DC Comics take place. In context, the term "DC Universe" usually refers to the main DC continuity. It contains various superheroes such as Superman, Batman, Wonder Woman, Green Lantern, the Flash, and Aquaman; as well as teams such as the Justice League, the Suicide Squad, and the Teen Titans. It also contains well-known supervillains, including the Joker, Lex Luthor, Brainiac, the Reverse-Flash, and Darkseid.

Beyond the main continuity, the DC Multiverse encompasses all alternate realities within DC Comics. The primary universe has been known by various names over time, with recent designations including "Prime Earth" or "Earth 0" (distinct from "Earth Prime"). The DC Universe and its alternate realities have been adapted across multiple media, including film serials, radio dramas, and modern films, with ongoing efforts to address the complex continuity through streamlined storylines and events.

== History ==
=== Golden Age ===
The fact that DC Comics characters coexisted in the same world was first established in All Star Comics #3 (1940) where several superheroes (who starred in separate stories in the series up to that point) met each other in a group dubbed the Justice Society of America. Earth-Two was the primary world of this publication era, as established in "Flash of Two Worlds" and "Crisis on Earth-Two!".

In the Silver Age, the Justice Society was reimagined as the Justice League, which was founded with Major League Baseball's National League and American League as inspiration for the name. The comic book that introduced the Justice League was titled The Brave and the Bold. However, the majority of National/DC's publications continued to be written with little regard of maintaining continuity with each other for the first few decades.

=== Silver Age ===
In the 1950s and 1960s, DC has introduced different versions of its characters, sometimes presenting them as if the earlier version had never existed, including: Flash (Barry Allen), Green Lantern (Hal Jordan), and Hawkman (Katar Hol). These new versions of the characters had similar powers but different names and personal histories. Similarly, they had characters such as Batman whose early adventures set in the 1940s could not easily be reconciled with stories featuring a still-youthful man in the 1960s. To explain this, they introduced the idea of the Multiverse in Flash #123 (1961) where the Silver Age Flash met his Golden Age counterpart. In addition to allowing the conflicting stories to "co-exist", it allowed the differing versions of characters to meet, and even team up to combat cross-universe threats. The writers gave designations such as "Earth-One", "Earth-Two", and so forth, to certain universes, designations which at times were also used by the characters themselves. Earth-One was the primary world of this publication era, as established in "Flash of Two Worlds" and "Crisis on Earth-One!".

=== Crisis on Infinite Earths ===
Over the years, as the number of titles published increased and the volume of past stories accumulated, it became increasingly difficult to maintain internal consistency. In the face of diminishing sales, maintaining the status quo of their most popular characters became attractive. Although retcons were used as a way to explain apparent inconsistencies in stories written, editors at DC came to consider the varied continuity of multiple Earths too difficult to keep track of, and feared that it was an obstacle to accessibility for new readers. To address this, they published the cross-universe miniseries Crisis on Infinite Earths in 1985, which merged universes and characters, reducing the Multiverse to a single unnamed universe, a collapsed earth, with a single history.

In 1999, The Kingdom reintroduced a variant of the old Multiverse concept called Hypertime, which allows for alternate versions of characters and worlds to exist. Later stories, such as Convergence (2015), establishes that the multiverse still exists.

=== The New 52 ===
The 2011 reboot of the DC Universe coincided with DC's publishing event The New 52, during which the publisher cancelled its ongoing titles and relaunched 52 new books, including a number of new books, set within a revised continuity. This follows the conclusion of the Flashpoint crossover storyline, which provided a jumping-off point for the existing continuity. A number of in-universe changes are intended to make characters more modern and accessible, though the scope of the changes varies from character to character. Some like Batman have their histories left largely intact, though compressed, while others were given wildly different histories and looks. DC stopped putting 'The New 52' logo on its publications in the summer of 2015, coinciding with the Convergence anniversary crossover event, which celebrated the history of the DC Multiverse and its various incarnations.

=== DC Rebirth ===
In February 2016, DC announced its DC Rebirth initiative, a line-wide relaunch of its titles, to begin in June 2016. Beginning with an 80-page one-shot which was released on May 25, 2016, DC Rebirth also sees Action Comics and Detective Comics return to their previous numbering (#957 and #934 respectively), all books releasing at US$2.99, multiple books shifting to a twice-monthly release schedule, a number of existing titles relaunching with new #1s, and the release of several new titles. DC used the Green Lantern: Rebirth and The Flash: Rebirth miniseries as examples of the basis for the initiative, which has been described as a rebirth of the DC Universe. The DC Rebirth initiative reintroduces concepts from pre-Flashpoint continuity that were lost with The New 52 and builds "on everything that's been published since Action Comics #1 up thru The New 52."

=== DC Universe ===
In October 2017, DC revealed that they would be discontinuing the Rebirth branding and logo from their titles in December 2017, releasing everything under a single umbrella title as the DC Universe. Coinciding with the release of The New Age of DC Heroes imprint, Dan DiDio explained, "We want to make it clear that this is all the DC Universe... Rebirth pretty much is the DCU now; while we're taking Rebirth off the books, we'll be following the direction that Rebirth established." Titles also received new trade dress, with those "that tie in clearly to our larger DC Universe" having a "DCU logo on them" in addition to corner boxes with icons of the characters to help identify the family of titles; titles outside the DCU, such as Injustice: Gods Among Us and DC Comics Bombshells would simply have the DC logo on them. DiDio added that the Young Animal imprint would continue as a separate line of titles.

=== Infinite Frontier ===
In 2021, DC announced a line-wide relaunch of ongoing monthly superhero comic book titles. A number of miniseries and one-shots were also announced. It is the follow-up to the DC Rebirth relaunch.

=== Dawn of DC ===
In late 2022, DC announced a new line-wide initiative titled Dawn of DC. The Dawn of DC is a year-long story telling initiative with various new, ongoing and limited series. The Dawn of DC titles received a new trade dress. The initiative meant to change the tone for the DC universe into something brighter and lighter, as well as creating more inter-connectivity between multiple series.

=== DC All In ===
In 2024, DC announced a line-wide relaunch of ongoing monthly superhero comic book titles. A number of miniseries and one-shots were also announced. It is the follow-up to the Dawn of DC relaunch.

== Description ==
A "class photo" of DC Universe characters, circa 1986. In this group shot, each character is drawn by either his or her original artist or an artist closely associated with the character.

Though DC Comics stories are often set in the United States of America, they are as often as not set in fictional cities or countries, such as Gotham City or Metropolis. These cities are effectively archetypes of cities, with Gotham City embodying more of the negative aspects of life in a large city, and Metropolis reflecting more of the positive aspects. Sentient alien species and even functioning interstellar societies are generally known to exist, and the arrival of alien spacecraft is not uncommon. Technologies which are only theoretical in the real world, such as artificial intelligence or are outright impossible according to modern science, such as faster-than-light travel, are functional and reproducible, though they are often portrayed as highly experimental and difficult to achieve. Demonstrable magic exists and can be learned. The general history of the fictional world is similar to the real one (for instance, there was a Roman Empire, and World War II and 9/11 both occurred), but many fantastic additions exist, such as the known existence of Atlantis. In recent years, stories have increasingly described events which bring the DC Universe farther away from reality, such as World War III occurring, Lex Luthor being elected as President of the United States in 2000, and cities and countries being destroyed.

=== New Earth ===
"New Earth" is the main universe of the DC multiverse. Originally created from the First Crisis, it was apparently erased from existence by the events of Flashpoint and replaced by "Prime Earth". By the end of the storyline Superman Reborn, the timelines of New Earth and Prime Earth realigned into a single reality.

=== Superheroes ===
Many of the superhumans on Earth owe their powers to the metagene, a genetic feature which enables the development of superpowers. Others owe their powers to magic, genetic manipulation or mutation, or bionics (see below). A large power gap resides between most superheroes and civilians. Still others owe their powers to alien physiology. There are also superheroes and supervillains who possess no superhuman powers at all, but rival their effectiveness with specialized equipment or "to the absolute limit of human potential" training in special skills, such as martial arts.

The humans first began using costumed identities to fight or commit crime during the 1930s. The first superheroes included characters like the Crimson Avenger and Sandman. In November 1940, the first superhero team, the Justice Society of America, was formed. During World War II, the United States' heroes banded together as the All-Star Squadron to protect the United States from the Axis powers. A magical spell cast by Adolf Hitler left many heroes were unable to enter Axis-held territories, leaving the offensive portion of the war to be fought mainly by normal humans such as Sgt. Rock, while the superheroes participated in defensive activities in Allied territories. After the war, under pressure from the paranoid Committee on Un-American Activities, the JSA disbanded. While many types of heroes were active afterwards, mainly non-costumed, it was not until Superman's public debut that a new generation of costumed heroes became active. Soon after, the Justice League of America was formed, and they have remained Earth's preeminent superhero team; most DC heroes (such as the Teen Titans) have either belonged to the League at some point, or have connections to it.

During World War II, the American government founded Project M to create experimental soldiers, such as the Creature Commandos. In the present, the government deals with metahumans and similar beings through its Department of Extranormal Operations (DEO), and A.R.G.U.S. Covertly, they use an organization of costumed (but non-superhuman) agents known as Checkmate. The government also formed the "Suicide Squad, a black ops group largely consisting of hired supervillains who were promised clemency.

=== Technology ===
Technology more advanced than that which currently exists in real life is available - but it is usually very expensive, and usually only their creators or the rich or powerful individuals have access to them. S.T.A.R. Labs is an independent research outfit that often develops these devices, while LexCorp is the main company selling them. The government also runs the secret Project Cadmus (located in the mountains near Metropolis) to develop clones and genetic manipulation in secret.

Robots and similar creations, including cyborgs, can have superior intelligence when they are created as sentient beings. The Manhunters, the Metal Men, Red Tornado, Robotman, Hourman, and Metallo are but a few examples. Some characters use technology to enhance their body, such as Steel, Cyborg and Cyborg Superman.

=== Hidden races ===
There are a few intelligent races living on Earth, among them:

- The Amazons of Themyscira and Bana-Mighdall.
- The last survivors of Atlantis, who changed themselves into water-breathing forms, including the human-like Poseidonians and the mermaid-like Tritonians. The Atlanteans also have Atlantean city-states like Xebel, the Kingdom of the Trench, the Kingdom of the Deserters, the Kingdom of the Brine, the Kingdom of the Wrights, and the Kingdom of the Sea Lights.
- There is also a tribe of highly intelligent, telepathic gorillas living in Gorilla City, an invisible city hidden in Africa. This is the home of Gorilla Grodd and Solovar.
- All-Star Superman introduced a race of underground dinosauroid-like creatures called the Subterranosauri.

=== Aliens ===
There are many intelligent extraterrestrial races as well. Many of them are humanoid and some are capable of reproducing with humans.

The United Planets is a governing body that oversees much of the universe. The organization primarily appears in stories featuring the Legion of Super-Heroes.

Species	Description
Dominators	The Dominators are a race of conquerors who destroy what they cannot dominate. Their mastery of advanced science, specifically the metagene, rivals that of the Psions.
Faceless Hunters	The Faceless Hunters are a blank-faced humanoid species from the sub-atomic planet Klaramar.
Guardians of the Universe	The Guardians of the Universe are a blue-skinned humanoid species who created the Green Lantern Corps. The Zamarons are an entirely female subset of the Guardians of the Universe who separated from them following a conflict over how to handle evil.
H'San Natall	The H'San Natall are a warrior race who forced the Psions to create superhuman hybrids of the human and H'San Natall races. Teen Titans members Risk, Joto (later Hot Spot), Argent, and Prysm are H'San Natall hybrids.
Khund	The Khunds are an ancient humanoid species from the high-gravity planet Khundia. Khunds have much denser bone and muscle tissue than humans.
Kryptonian	The Kryptonians are a humanoid species from the planet Krypton who possess a variety of superpowers derived from solar energy. Most of the Kryptonians were killed when Krypton was destroyed, with Superman and several of his supporting characters being the only survivors.
Manhunters	The Manhunters are sentient androids, originally created as a force for peace by the Oans until they went rogue.
Monitors	The Monitors are a group of ancient cosmic beings from a vast alien civilization who ruled the multiverse for billions of years.
New Gods	The New Gods are a virtually immortal race of deified humanoids originating from a plane of existence known as the Fourth World and centered on the conflicting planets of New Genesis and Apokolips. The two warring factions are led by the benign Highfather and the ruthless Darkseid respectively.
Psion	The Psions are a reptilian species created by the Guardians of the Universe.
White Martian	The White Martians are a subspecies of the Martians, a shapeshifting species from the planet Mars. As a race of shapeshifters, physical appearance has little meaning for Martians, and the Greens and Whites are only separated by underlying psychological differences and philosophies.

=== Cosmic entities ===
The Presence is the God of the DC Universe; he created all reality. He is also among the most powerful beings in creation. There are several lesser beings in the DC universe that possess god-like powers, through energy manipulation, magic ability, or technological advancement. Magic and the supernatural are often depicted as being real in the DC Universe, though some skeptics maintain that there are scientific explanations to all such events. The narration of the mystic and harsh dark reality is more common in DC's Vertigo Comics because its stories lurk outside of superhero fantasy; the Vertigo series have beings that relate better to civilian life, although both universes are subject to fantastical realms and unworldly dimensions. Magic is too powerful in the physical world, where harnessing magic can distort and even destroy reality if not properly controlled.

=== Other dimensions ===
The DC Universe is composed of a number of different dimensional planes, most notably parallel Earths (see Multiverse).

==== Heaven and Hell ====
Heaven and Hell exist in the DC Universe but may not exist in the same continuum. Versions vary from the Vertigo and DC Universe series with writers of the Vertigo Universe depicting them in relation to religion and mythology while the writers in the DCU have a tendency to narrate fantasy.

==== Speed Force ====
The Speed Force is an extradimensional energy source which provides speedsters with their powers. Accessing the Speed Force makes it possible to run at incredible speeds, even faster than light, and even to jump in and out of the timestream, thereby traveling through time with a limited degree of control. The Speed Force also acts as an afterlife for deceased speedsters.

In DC Comics, the Flash family of speedsters derive their abilities from an extradimensional energy source known as the Speed Force, which grants them superhuman speed and various other abilities required to use it. The Speed Force is a cosmic force based around velocity and movement and is the in-universe representation of reality in motion, being the very cosmic force that pushes space and time forward.

==== The timestream ====
It is possible to travel in time in by several means, including moving faster than the speed of light. The Legion of Super-Heroes from 1,000 years into the future in particular have access to time-travel technology, while Rip Hunter is a present-day authority on the technology. Originally, it was impossible to change the past, or to exist in two places at the same time. This was changed after the Anti-Monitor tried to change history at the beginning of time during Crisis on Infinite Earths.

== DC Universe comics ==
- DC Universe: Legacies
- DC Universe Online: Legends

== In other media ==
- DC Universe Roleplaying Game

=== Film ===
- Films based on DC Comics:
  - Superman in film
  - Batman in film
  - Flash in film
  - Wonder Woman in film
  - Green Lantern in film
- DC Extended Universe
- DC Universe (franchise)
- The Lego Movie, The Lego Batman Movie and The Lego Movie 2: The Second Part (set in a multiverse of which a Lego DC Universe is part)

=== Television ===
- List of television series based on DC Comics publications

=== Animation ===
- DC Animated Universe
- DC Universe Animated Original Movies
- DC Animated Movie Universe

=== Toys ===
- DC Universe (toyline)
  - DC Universe Classics
- Lego DC

=== Video games ===
- Video games based on DC Comics:
  - List of Superman video games
  - List of Batman video games
  - Mortal Kombat vs. DC Universe
  - DC Universe Online
  - Lego Batman 2: DC Super Heroes
  - Injustice: Gods Among Us
  - Injustice 2
  - Scribblenauts Unmasked: A DC Comics Adventure
  - Infinite Crisis
  - Suicide Squad: Kill the Justice League
- The Lego Movie Videogame, The Lego Batman Movie Game, Lego Dimensions and The Lego Movie 2 Videogame (set in the same multiverse as the aforementioned films)

== See also ==
- History of the DC Universe
- List of events of the DC Universe
- List of locations of the DC Universe
- List of fictional universes in animation and comics
- Superman (franchise)
- Batman (franchise)
