= List of DC Comics characters: S =

List of characters whose names start with S

== Sabbac ==
Sabbac is the name of several supervillains appearing in DC Comics. The original Sabbac, Timothy Karnes, debuted in Captain Marvel Jr. #4 (February 1943), and was created by Otto Binder and Al Carreno as an enemy of Captain Marvel Jr. An updated version, Ishmael Gregor, debuted in Outsiders #8 (March 2004), and was created by Judd Winick and Tom Raney as a nemesis for both Junior and the Outsiders. Another version, Timothy Barnes, debuted in Superman/Shazam: First Thunder #2 (December 2005) by Judd Winick and Joshua Middleton. A fourth version, Mr. Bryer, was introduced in Justice League #10 (August 2012), and was created by Geoff Johns and Gary Frank. All versions of the character are humans who were mystically empowered and given demonic forms.

=== Sabbac in other media ===
- Ishmael Gregor appears in the fifth season of Arrow, portrayed by David Meunier. This version is the boss of the Solntsevskaya branch of the Bratva. After Oliver Queen reveals Gregor's true allegiance and causes a civil war within the Bratva's ranks, Gregor is killed and replaced by Anatoly Knyazev.
- The Ishmael Gregor incarnation of Sabbac appears in Black Adam, portrayed by Marwan Kenzari. This version is the leader of Intergang's Kahndaq branch and a descendant of Kahndaqi tyrant Ahk-Ton.

== Simon Saint ==
Simon Saint is a character appearing in comic books published by DC Comics, created by James Tynion IV and Jorge Jiménez. He first appeared in Infinite Frontier #0 (2021).

Simon Saint is an engineer and the owner of Saint Industries. During the Fear State crossover, Saint partners with Scarecrow, offering him the resources to create a new fear toxin. Saint also founds the Magistrate, a private army hired to make Gotham City into a police state, and establishes former Arkham Asylum guard Sean Mahoney as their vanguard Peacekeeper-01. After an unsuccessful attempt to kill Poison Ivy, he is eventually placed under house arrest by the U.S. military.

== Salem the Witch Girl ==
- First appearance: The New Golden Age #1 (2022)
- Created by: Geoff Johns, Todd Nauck
- Teams: Young Justice Society; Justice Society of America
- Abilities: Witch-in-training; skilled user of magic; Supernatural knowledge; Assistance via cat familiar (Midnight) and sentient broom (Sweep)
- Aliases: Salem the Witch Girl, Witch Girl

Salem the Witch Girl (Salem Nader) is a character appearing in comic books published by DC Comics. Created by Geoff Johns and Todd Nauck, she is the sidekick and apprentice of the original Doctor Fate (Kent Nelson). In the final issue of Flashpoint Beyond, it is revealed Salem was among the thirteen missing Golden Age superheroes found in the Time Masters' capsules, retroactively making her a figure of Nelson's past.

Born in the mid-1900s as a native of Limbo Town, she inherited a curse from her mother whom escaped the dimension which unwittingly caused misfortune to those she interacted with. In 1940, she encountered Fate, who was immune to the curse, and together they thwarted Wotan's plot. Becoming Doctor Fate's sidekick, Salem adopted the name "Salem the Witch Girl" and was aided by her black cat familiar Midnight before mysteriously disappearing following her curse nearly killing Inza Cramer, Nelson's girlfriend and partner. He and the Justice Society Dark have been unable to find her.

Due to being in the Time Masters' capsules, knowledge of her existence was erased from all those whom knew her, including Kent Nelson. When the capsules failed, Salem and the other 13 missing Golden Age characters were sent back to their own time with history rebuilding around them. Salem ends up on Childminder's island until she is eventually rescued by Stargirl and brought into the present day (2023). Hourman states that she and the other Lost Children cannot be returned to their own times, as this would risk causing a temporal paradox. Salem meets with the current Doctor Fate and relative of Kent, Khalid Nassour. Hostile to him due to having inherited the mantle, he places Salem in the care of the Justice Society, allowing her to take his place on the team until she was ready to reconcile with him.

Following her introduction, Salem appeared in Titans: Beast World. Following Eclipso's defeat at the hands of Legionnaire, Salem accepts Khalid as the wielder of the Doctor Fate title and returns to Limbo Town to wrap up some loose ends, stating that she will help him if he needs her.

== Sand Blaster ==
Sand Blaster was created by writer Joshua Williamson and artist Carmine Di Giandomenico, and first appeared in The Flash vol. 5 #14 (March 2017).

== Sand Demon ==
Sand Demon (Eddie Slick) is the manager of the wrestler King Crusher and provided him with mutative steroids to win a match. However, Firestorm defeats him while exposing the steroid operation in the process. Slick is later exposed to the steroids and buried in the Nevada Desert, transforming him into a sand-manipulating metahuman. Firestorm overheats Sand Demon and turns him into glass, which shatters after hitting the floor.

=== Sand Demon in other media ===
- Two versions of Eddie Slick appear in The Flash episode "Flash of Two Worlds", portrayed by Kett Turton.
  - The alternate Earth-2 version of Slick appears as Sand Demon.
  - An Earth-1 version of Slick is a human arsonist who served time in Blackgate Penitentiary.

== Sardine ==
- First appearance: Showcase #3 (July–August 1956)
- Created by: Robert Kanigher (script); Russ Heath (art)

Sardine is a non-superpowered commando. Along with his companions named Shark and Whale, he is part of the World War II-era fighting unit called the Frogmen. His sole appearance is in Showcase #3 (July–August 1956). The story was written by Robert Kanigher, and illustrated by Russ Heath.

== Sargon the Sorcerer ==
Sargon the Sorcerer is the name of several characters appearing in DC Comics. The first version of the character appeared in 1941, during the period known to fans as the Golden Age.

=== John Sargent ===
The original incarnation of the character is John Sargent, who gained magic powers after reciting an incantation while holding an artifact that had been given to him by his mother. Fearing a negative public reception from having genuine magic powers, Sargent creates a stage magician persona to disguise his abilities. Sargon is later killed during a ritual meant to help Swamp Thing and Deadman battle the Great Darkness.

=== David Sargent ===
The second Sargon, David Sargent, was created by Steve Niles and Scott Hampton. David is the grandson of John Sargent. He gained a shard of the Ruby of Life from demons who had previously been unable to explore John's estate due to magical protections. The character's tenure is short-lived, as he is seemingly killed by Lobo after sacrificing his own energies to transport heroes to the world of the living.

=== Jaimini Sargent ===
Jaimini Sargent is the daughter of John Sargent. Unlike prior depictions of Sargon, Jaimini is portrayed primarily as a villain and enemy of John Constantine.

=== Sargon the Sorcerer in other media ===
Sargon the Sorcerer appears in the Arrowverse crossover Crisis on Infinite Earths, portrayed by Raúl Herrera.

== Satan Girl ==
Satan Girl is the name of several characters in DC Comics, all enemies of Supergirl.

=== Clone of Supergirl ===
The first Satan Girl is a villain who infects the female members of the Legion of Super-Heroes with a disease that makes them weak and gives them red skin. Despite Satan Girl possessing Kryptonian powers, Supergirl believes her to be an android, as she is not weak to kryptonite like a Kryptonian or lead like a Daxamite. Satan Girl is subdued by the Legion of Super-Pets and reveals to Supergirl that she is a clone created after Supergirl unknowingly exposed herself to red kryptonite. Satan Girl had infected the Legionnaires in an attempt to siphon kryptonite radiation from them and sustain herself beyond the 48-hour time limit of the kryptonite's effects. The kryptonite's effects wear off, with Satan Girl merging with Supergirl. Supergirl learns that Satan Girl had been immune to kryptonite due to wearing a lead suit.

A storyline in Supergirl (vol. 5) is inspired by the original Satan Girl story, with black kryptonite results in "Dark Supergirl". In the eighth volume of Supergirl (2025), Lesla-Lar exposes Supergirl to black kryptonite, transforming her and Krypto into evil versions of themselves. However, Lesla-Lar has a change of heart and returns the two to normal with help from Titano.

=== Dolores Pratchet ===
The second Satan Girl is Dolores Pratchet, an 18th-century witch whose daughter Rachel was assumed dead after saving her friend Ember from being executed at the stake. Rather than dying, the two girls are fused into a singular entity known as the Angel of Fire. Dolores makes a deal with the demonic Carnivore and agrees to become his servant, gaining magical powers. Satan Girl's magic pulls the current Angel of Fire, Supergirl, from the present and switches her with Ember, making it so that she would die on the stake instead and Rachel and Ember would exist in the present. Supergirl escapes with help from Ember, who returns to her own time to die on the stake. Satan Girl is erased from existence due to the timeline being altered.

=== S'tanicule Gyrstess ===
The third Satan Girl is S'tanicule Gyrstess, a goddess of love and death who originates from another dimension. She is transported to the main universe when Brainiac 5 accidentally blasts a statue dedicated to her with chronon energy. Supergirl and Brainiac 5 ultimately defeat S'tanicule and return her to her dimension.

== Mia Saunders ==
Mia Saunders first appeared in JSA: All Stars #2 (1999). Mia is the infant daughter of Kendra Saunders (Hawkgirl). As a teenager, Kendra got pregnant with Mia and had to give her up for adoption to an Oregon couple. It is later revealed that Kendra regularly visits her daughter.

== Scalphunter ==
Brian Savage was born at some point during the 1830s to Matt Savage. During his childhood, his family's ranch was attacked by the Kiowa, who captured Brian. The Indians raised him, naming him Ke-Woh-No-Tay ('He Who Is Less Than Human'). His favorite weapons were a bowie knife and a tomahawk, but he was an expert with bow and arrow, revolver and rifle. He also was very good at unarmed combat, using mostly Indian wrestling moves. Brian ultimately assumed the name "Scalphunter" as he left the tribe that raised him. Eventually returning to white society, Brian became the sheriff of Opal City.

== Scarab ==
Scarab is an alias used by several characters in DC Comics.

=== Earth-3 equivalent ===
An Earth-3 equivalent, created by Mark Waid and Rod Whigham, first appeared in Justice League Quarterly #8 (September 1992). Scarab is a counterpart of Dan Garrett / Blue Beetle and a member from the Antimatter universe Qward who is a reserve member of the Crime Syndicate.

=== Maat Shadid ===
Maat Shadid, created by Bill Willingham and Francisco Rodriguez de la Fuente, first appeared in Robin vol. 2 #124 (May 2004). She is an Egyptian assassin equipped with a scarab-themed battlesuit. Maat is hired by Johnny Warlock to eliminate the third Robin, but instead fights Batman and Stephanie Brown (the fourth Robin). Maat is hired by Spoiler and Ulysses Armstrong (posing as Red Robin) in order to confuse Tim Drake. Shadid is later hired by corrupt detectives Marcus Wise and Roman Cavallo to eliminate Drake, but is defeated by Red Robin and fooled by Miss Martian impersonating her target.

== Scarlet Skier ==
The Scarlet Skier (Dren Keeg) is a character appearing in American comic books published by DC Comics. He was created by Keith Giffen and J. M. DeMatteis during their comical run in Justice League of America.

Scarlet Skier is the arch-enemy of the Green Lantern G'nort. Eventually, Scarlet Skier was stranded on Earth, befriended G'nort, and joined Justice League Antarctica alongside Big Sir, Clock King, Cluemaster, Major Disaster, Mighty Bruce, and Multi-Man. Following the incident with killer penguins and an earthquake that destroys the Justice League Antarctica's base, Maxwell Lord fires them and disbands the Justice League Antarctica.

== Scirocco ==
Scirocco (Cassandra Sharp) was a geologist who was doing research in Death Valley. After she is caught in a sandstorm, Mento saves Sharp's life, giving her the ability to manipulate wind. As Srirocco, Sharp goes on to join Hybrid.

== Scorch ==
Originally a civilian from Pisboe, Virginia, Aubrey Sparks was transformed into Scorch, a villain with pyrokinetic abilities, during the "Emperor Joker" storyline. Joker uses power stolen from Mister Mxyzptlk to create an alternate universe in which Superman is a villain and creates his own warped version of the Justice League, with Scorch among its ranks. After Joker is defeated, Mxyzptlk preserves Scorch, among other residents of Joker's universe, by transporting them to the main universe.

In the storyline "Infinite Crisis", Scorch reappears as a member of Alexander Luthor Jr.'s Secret Society of Super Villains, having been led to perceive the Justice League as a threat. As her accomplices battle Superman, Scorch realizes the error of her ways and helps Superman defeat them.

=== Scorch in other media ===
Scorch makes non-speaking cameo appearances in DC Super Hero Girls as a student of Super Hero High.

== Scorcher ==
Scorcher is the name of several characters in DC Comics.

=== Bike Buzzard's version ===
The first Scorcher is the leader of the Bike Buzzards and took part in the Sand Scrambler racing event. Scorcher and the Bike Buzzards used unorthodox methods to win the event and were then defeated by the Teen Titans.

=== Arsonist version ===
The second Scorcher is an unnamed arsonist with a flamethrower.

=== Cindy Brand ===
Cindy Brand is a pyrokinetic supervillain who is an enemy of Scare Tactics.

=== First Dark Nemesis version ===
The fourth Scorcher that is a member of Dark Nemesis is a pyrokinetic and a human/H'San Natall hybrid who grew up in the same special orphanage as Blizard. Scorcher later orchestrated a prison break, and Risk discovered her connection with the H'San Natall. The rest of Dark Nemesis worked for Veil again and killed her while framing Risk. The Teen Titans later found evidence to clear Risk's name.

=== Second Dark Nemesis version ===
The fifth Scorcher, a member of Dark Nemesis, is a pyrokinetic female and the successor of the previous version. She and the rest of Dark Nemesis were sent to acquire the files on Apex and were easily taken down by a refocused Titans.

=== Scorcher in other media ===
- An original incarnation of Scorcher appears in the Supergirl episode "Welcome to Earth", portrayed by Nadine Crocker. This version is a pyrokinetic alien called an Infernian. She mounts two failed attempts to assassinate President Olivia Marsdin before she can pass the Alien Amnesty Act into law for fear that it will lead to alien registration acts until she is defeated by Supergirl, Alex Danvers and Maggie Sawyer.
- Scorcher appears as a character summon in Scribblenauts Unmasked: A DC Comics Adventure.

== Scream Queen ==
Scream Queen (Nina Skorzeny) was the vampire lead singer of Scare Tactics. She was created by Len Kaminski and Anthony Williams, and first appeared in Showcase '96 #11 (December 1996).

A member of the Skorzeny clan of vampires in Markovia, Nina's family were killed by a group of vampire killers called the Graveyard Shift. The group was responsible for many vampire concentration camps as they attempted to exterminate all the vampires in Markovia. Nina was able to survive their efforts and escaped to America. This left her with a deep distrust of humans, whom she called "breathers" or "normals."

After making it to the United States, Nina is captured by R-Complex, a government agency that subjects her to numerous experiments. She is eventually rescued by the efforts of Arnold Burnsteel and Fate. The pair also frees Fang, Slither, and Gross-Out. Burnsteel suggests the group form the band Scream Tactics to serve as cover while they go on the run from R-Complex agents.

=== Scream Queen in other media ===
- An original, unidentified incarnation of Scream Queen based on Silver Banshee makes a non-speaking appearance in the Batman: The Brave and the Bold episode "Trials of the Demon!".
- An original incarnation of Scream Queen appears in Justice League: Crisis on Two Earths, voiced by Kari Wuhrer. This version is an alternate universe version of Black Canary who is a member of the Crime Syndicate.

== Scylla ==
- Further reading: Scylla at the Comic Book DB (archived from the original); Scylla at the Grand Comics Database

Scylla is a character appearing in comic books published by DC Comics. Created by Peter David and Martin Egeland, she first appeared in Aquaman (vol. 5) #1 (August 1994).

Scylla and her husband Charybdis are international terrorists who attempt to kill Aquaman. However, Scylla was killed and Charybdis was driven mad by grief, trying to kill Aquaman and absorb his powers.

== Shakedown ==
Shakedown is a member of the Masters of Disaster who possesses geokinesis (the ability to manipulate Earth). He serves as the peacekeeper of the group. Shakedown was drowned and killed by teammate New Wave after refusing to kill a hostage.

=== Shakedown in other media ===
An original incarnation of Shakedown, Marcus Bishop, appears in Black Lightning, portrayed by Hosea Chanchez. This version is an inmate who gained his powers through an A.S.A. experiment called "Project Masters of Disaster".

== Shango ==
- First appearance: Firestorm the Nuclear Man #95 (March 1990)
- Created by: John Ostrander and Tom Mandrake
- Abilities: African Storm God wields a magical stone labrys
- Aliases: Shango
- Further reading: Shango at the Comic Book DB (archived from the original); Shango at the Grand Comics Database

Shango is an adaptation of the deity Sàngó from the Yorùbá culture for the DC Universe. The character, adapted by John Ostrander and Tom Mandrake, first appeared in Firestorm the Nuclear Man #95 (March 1990).

Within the context of the stories, Shango is a deity and the war chief of the Orishas. He is responsible for asking Ogun to sever the Golden Chain linking Ifé, the land of the gods, with Earth. He is also responsible for restoring it in modern times. When he leads the reemergence of the pantheon in Africa, he encounters Firestorm. He and the pantheon are taken to task by Firestorm for their abandonment of Africa.

== Shark ==
- First appearance: Commando: Showcase #3 (July–August 1956); Hardwicke: Detective Comics #253 (March 1958); Mutated tiger shark: Green Lantern (vol. 2) #24 (October 1963)
- Created by: Commando: Robert Kanigher (script); Russ Heath (art); Hardwicke: Dave Wood (script); Sheldon Moldoff (art); Mutated tiger shark: John Broome (script); Gil Kane (art)

The Shark is the name of three characters in DC Comics publications, none of which should be confused with King Shark.

=== First version ===
The first Shark is a non-superpowered commando. Along with his companions named Sardine and Whale, he is part of the World War II-era fighting unit called the Frogmen. His sole appearance is in Showcase #3 (July–August 1956). The story was written by Robert Kanigher, and illustrated by Russ Heath.

=== Third version ===
The third Shark, who has used the aliases T. S. Smith and Karshon in the past, debuted in Green Lantern (vol. 2) #24 (October 1963). He is a tiger shark that rapidly mutated after exposure to nuclear waste (later retconned to be part of experimentation from the alien Kroloteans). The rapid evolutionary growth gives him high intelligence, a humanoid appearance and telepathic powers.

Karshon returns in DC Rebirth as a member of the Suicide Squad.

=== Shark in other media ===
- The Shark appears in The All-New Super Friends Hour, voiced by Robert Ridgely.
- The Shark makes non-speaking cameo appearances in Justice League Unlimited as a member of Gorilla Grodd's Secret Society.
- The Shark makes non-speaking cameo appearances in Batman: The Brave and the Bold.
- The Shark appears as a character summon in Scribblenauts Unmasked: A DC Comics Adventure.
- Karshon appears in Aquaman and the Lost Kingdom, portrayed by Indya Moore. This version is a female Atlantean and the leader of the Council of Atlantis.

== Shat-Ru ==
- First appearance: Doctor Fate (vol. 2) #25 (February 1991)
- Created by: William Messner-Loebs, Vince Giarrano
- Teams: Lords of Order
- Abilities: Immense magical powers and possession. Charismatic personality.
- Aliases: Kent Nelson Sr.

Shat-Ru is a supporting character appearing in American comic books published by DC Comics.

Among the Lords of Order, he was formerly antagonistic against Doctor Fate for perceived failures as an agent of order, believing him to have humiliated the Lords of Orders for failing to abolish the forces of chaos caused by the Lords of Chaos during his tenure as Doctor Fate.

Shat-Ru would later challenge Inza Cramer as Doctor Fate, becoming trapped in the previous, old body of Kent Nelson unable to release himself without risking his destruction. Over time, Shat-Ru bonds with Nelson and Inza while posing as Kent's grandfather who is supposedly continuing his work as a college teacher teaching archaeology. He also serves as Nelson's patron temporarily and enters a relationship with the human Dorothea.

== Shellshock ==
Shellshock is the name of several characters in DC Comics.

=== Ruth Spencer ===
Ruth Spencer is a criminal with thermal blasts who is the aunt of Paul Spencer. She once fought against Hawk and Dove.

During the "Infinite Crisis" storyline, Shellshock appears as a member of Alexander Luthor Jr.'s Secret Society of Super Villains.

=== Black Ops member ===
The second Shellshock is an unnamed woman who is a member of Black Ops and possesses super-strength.

== Shift ==
Shift is a fragment of Metamorpho who obtained sentience and took on the name of Shift. Metamorpho attempts to re-assimilate his "twin", but the Outsiders convince him that the twin deserves the chance to lead his own life. This second Metamorpho chose the name "Shift" and develops a relationship with Indigo. When she dies, he becomes depressed over her death.

After the events of "One Year Later", Shift chooses to be re-assimilated into Metamorpho after inadvertently killing 44 people during Black Lightning's escape from Iron Heights Penitentiary.

=== Shift in other media ===
Shift appears as a character summon in Scribblenauts Unmasked: A DC Comics Adventure.

== Shiv ==
- First appearance: DCU Villains Secret Files and Origins #1 (April 1999)
- Created by: Geoff Johns and Tom Mandrake
- Teams: Injustice Society
- Abilities: Sword wielder and power item user
- Aliases: Shiv

Shiv is a character appearing in American comic books published by DC Comics. She appeared in 11 issues of Stars and S.T.R.I.P.E., two issues of JSA and four issues of JSA All-Stars.

Cindy Burman is the daughter of the supervillain the Dragon King. She had a grudge against Stargirl.

Shiv was also a member of Johnny Sorrow's incarnation of the Injustice Society.

=== Shiv in other media ===
- Shiv appears as a character summon in Scribblenauts Unmasked: A DC Comics Adventure.
- Cindy Burman appears in Stargirl, portrayed by Meg DeLacy as a young adult, and Sophia Annabelle Kim as a child. This version is the girlfriend of Henry King Jr., rival of Yolanda Montez, cheerleading captain of Blue Valley High, and the most popular student at school, though most students shun her due to her mean-spirited nature. Additionally, she is determined to follow in her father Shiro Ito's footsteps and join the Injustice Society, having been genetically modified at a young age and gaining a healing factor and retractable wrist blades. However, her father refuses to acknowledge her, resulting in her becoming bitter and spiteful. Throughout the first season, she steals some of her father's inventions to challenge Stargirl, only to be defeated by Henry and imprisoned by Ito. Nonetheless, she escapes imprisonment, kills her father, and locates a gem containing Eclipso. In the second season, Burman and Eclipso create their own Injustice Society called Injustice Unlimited to fight Stargirl and her Justice Society of America (JSA). However, Stargirl accidentally frees Eclipso who sends Burman to the Shadowlands, though Shade eventually rescues her. Following this, Burman contacts the Crock family to help the JSA defeat Eclipso before intending to make amends with Yolanda and join the JSA. In the third season, Burman develops scales on her skin. Ten years later, she joins the JSA as "Dragon Queen".

== Matthew Shrieve ==
Matthew Shrieve is a lieutenant and intelligence officer in the U.S. Army who is an expert at hand-to-hand combat and marksmanship. He was handpicked to lead the Creature Commandos.

=== Matthew Shrieve in other media ===
- Matthew Shrieve appears in the Batman: The Brave and the Bold episode "Four Star Spectacular!", voiced by Marc Worden.
- Matthew Shrieve appears in the "Creature Commandos" segment of DC Nation Shorts, voiced by Chris Cox.
- Matthew Shrieve appears in flashbacks depicted in the third season of Arrow, portrayed by Marc Singer. This version is a U.S. Army general and member of A.R.G.U.S. While overseeing Oliver Queen and Tatsu and Maseo Yamashiro's work in Hong Kong, he betrayed A.R.G.U.S. to steal the "Alpha-Omega" virus and cripple China, during which he infected and killed the Yamashiros' son Akio with it. Shrieve is ultimately foiled by Queen and the Yamashiros before Maseo executes him.
- Matthew Shrieve appears in DC Showcase: Sgt. Rock, voiced by Keith Ferguson.

== Shush ==
Shush (Abigail Hall) is a character appearing in comic books published by DC Comics. The character, created by writer Joshua Williamson and artist Simone Di Meo, made her first appearance in Batman and Robin vol. 3 #2 (December 2023).

== Sickle ==
Sickle is the name of several characters in DC Comics.

=== Igor ===
Igor and his brother Ivan were acrobats who were turned into deadly agents by the NKVD's "Red Flag" program and fought the Blackhawks as Hammer and Sickle.

=== Natasha Ulyanova ===
Natasha Ulyanova is a Russian woman and the sister of Hammer. They went together as Hammer and Sickle and fought the Outsiders.

In "Infinite Crisis", Hammer and Sickle join Alexander Luthor Jr.'s Secret Society of Super Villains.

== Sidd ==
Sidd is a character appearing in comic books published by DC Comics.

Sidd is a minor villain in Batman: The Brave and the Bold and later teams up with Clayface and Facade in Justice League.

== Silencer ==
Silencer is the name of several characters in DC Comics.

=== First Silencer ===
The first Silencer is a killer who has sound-negating abilities. He killed many people on behalf of a man named Benny Fortis before being defeated by Captain Marvel.

=== Honor Guest ===
Introduced in "The New Age of DC Heroes" comic book line, Honor Guest was an assassin with silence manipulation abilities who worked for Leviathan before Talia al Ghul forced her to retire.

=== Silencer in other media ===
The Honor Guest incarnation of Silencer appears in Arrow, portrayed by Miranda Edwards. This version is a member of the Longbow Hunters.

== Silent Knight ==
- First appearance: The Brave and the Bold #1 (August 1955)
- Created by: Robert Kanigher, Irv Novick
- Teams: Knights of the Round Table, Knights Inc.
- Further reading: Silent Knight at Comic Vine; Silent Knight at League of Comic Geeks; Silent Knight at DC Database

The Silent Knight (Brian Kent) is a medieval hero appearing in comic books published by DC Comics. The character first appeared in The Brave and the Bold #1 (August 1955) and was created by Robert Kanigher and Irv Novick. He was one of three historical fiction characters to premiere in the first issue, the other two being Golden Gladiator and Viking Prince.

Brian Kent is a knight living in sixth-century Great Britain. At a jousting tournament, Sir Oswald Bane kills Brian's father Edwin, a feudal lord, claiming it to be an accident. Before he dies, Edwin instructs Brian to continue his rule and look after the people. Oswald hears this and sets Brian to be trained by Sir Grot, a friend of Edwin.

While looking for one of Oswald's prize hawks, Brian finds a trunk containing armor and a shield, which perfectly fit him. He hears travelers being threatened by Oswald's men-at-arms, and comes to their aid, defeating the soldiers. When asked his name, he stays silent to prevent the soldiers from identifying him. Hence, he becomes known as the Silent Knight.

In the 1990s Hawkman series, Brian is revealed to be a past avatar of the Hawk-God. A further retcon implies him to be a past incarnation of Carter Hall.

In post-Rebirth continuity, Silent Knight is a former friend of Jason Blood who was corrupted after venturing into the Hollow Kingdom and became a conqueror.

== Silent Majority ==
Silent Majority is the name of three characters in the DC Universe.

=== First version ===
The first Silent Majority is a member of the Force of July, a government-sponsored superhero team. He first appeared in Batman and the Outsiders Annual #1 (September 1984). He is killed by Kobra's forces during the Janus Directive event.

Silent Majority is resurrected in the Infinite Frontier relaunch, where he is recruited by the Penguin, but he is soon killed in battle.

=== Second version ===
In Crisis Aftermath: The Battle for Blüdhaven #1 (June 2006), a second Silent Majority appears as a member of Freedom's Ring which are employed by the government to defend Blüdhaven from metahumans. Silent Majority is killed by the Nuclear Legion in this same issue.

=== Third version ===
When S.H.A.D.E. takes control of Freedom's Ring, an unnamed agent is the third Silent Majority.

== Silver Ghost ==
The Silver Ghost is the name of two characters appearing in American comic books published by DC Comics. The first version of the character, created by Gerry Conway and Ric Estrada, first appeared in Freedom Fighters #1 (March 1976).

=== Raphael van Zandt ===
Raphael van Zandt is a member of the Secret Society of Super Villains as the Silver Ghost. He opposes the Freedom Fighters in general and Firebrand in particular.

=== Second version ===
In an untold story of Earth-Two, the second Silver Ghost is a detective who wanted to become a vigilante like Batman. After witnessing Batman defeat criminals without weapons, Silver Ghost decides against becoming a vigilante.

=== Silver Ghost in other media ===
A genderbent incarnation of Silver Ghost, Raya van Zandt, appears in The Flash episode "The Flash & the Furious", portrayed by Gabrielle Walsh. This version is an ex-Air Force pilot under the call sign "Silver Ghost" who wields a meta-tech key fob that allows her to control motorized vehicles.

== Silver Monkey ==
Silver Monkey is the name of two characters in DC Comics.

=== First version ===
The first Silver Monkey is a martial artist and mercenary who is a member of the Brotherhood of the Monkey Fist. He was hired by the Shan Triad.

=== Second version ===
In "Salvation Run", an unidentified Silver Monkey is seen among the villains on the prison planet Cygnus 4019.

=== Silver Monkey in other media ===
- Silver Monkey appears as a character summon in Scribblenauts Unmasked: A DC Comics Adventure.
- Silver Monkey appears in Beware the Batman, voiced by James Remar. This version is a member of the League of Assassins.

== Silver Scarab ==
Silver Scarab is the name of several characters in DC Comics.

=== Second version ===
An unidentified person operated as the second Silver Scarab when impersonating Hector Hall. He was depicted as an ally of Hath-Set.

== Sterling Silversmith ==
Sterling Silversmith is a silver-obsessed businessman who used his antique store as a front for his smuggling activities. His activity attracted the attention of Batman. He was defeated by Batman and arrested by the Gotham City Police Department.

Sterling Silversmith later escaped from prison and collaborated with Crime Doctor. Unfortunately, he poisoned Crime Doctor when he learned that he knows who Batman is. Silversmith and his henchmen were defeated and arrested while Crime Doctor was taken to the hospital.

== Simyan ==
Simyan is an ape-like DNAlien created by Dabney Donovan who sided with Darkseid and works with the New God Mokkari in running Apokolips' Evil Factory, which was established as a rival of Project Cadmus.

In 2011, "The New 52" rebooted the DC universe. Simyan is depicted as a New God who is the half-brother of Mokkari.

== Sin ==
Sin is a character appearing in comic books published by DC Comics. She first appeared in Birds of Prey #92 (May 2006) and was created by writer Gail Simone and artist Paulo Siqueira.

Sin was introduced when Black Canary made a deal with Lady Shiva to switch lives for a year, in which Dinah would train as Shiva had done, while Shiva took her position with Oracle and the Birds of Prey. During Dinah's training, she trained in Asia under "Mother", a cruel martial arts master and matriarch. While there, Dinah met a little girl dubbed Sin who was being groomed to become the next Lady Shiva, following the death of the current one. Sin and Dinah developed an immediate familial bond. When Dinah grew tired of Mother and her training, she decided to leave, taking Sin with her. Returning to Metropolis with Sin, Dinah introduced Sin to her friends in the Birds of Prey, who all took a shine to the girl. They began to teach her the wonders of the western world and educate her in English and name-calling (she on occasion addressed Helena as "Spinster"). Over time Dinah began to question her life as member of the Birds of Prey, now that she had a child to care for. After several missions, she leaves the team to raise Sin full-time. This would prove difficult after Dinah rejoined the Justice League.

In the Black Canary miniseries, the League of Assassins attempts to kidnap Sin, seeing the martial arts prodigy as a messiah who could unite their splintered and then-leaderless group. In an attempt to save Sin from the League, Green Arrow fakes the child's death. Though the decision pains him, he conceals the truth from Dinah so that her grief will be real and convincing to their enemies. Dinah later learns of her foster daughter's survival. Sin lives in a secluded monastery, to keep her safe from the League of Assassins and others who would exploit her intuitive gift for the martial arts. Black Canary makes occasional trips to visit her, still playing the role of mother part-time.

=== Sin in other media ===
Sin appears in Arrow, portrayed by Bex Taylor-Klaus. This version is Cindy Simone, a streetwise Caucasian teenager from Starling City and a confidante and sidekick of Sara Lance.

== Beautia Sivana ==
Beautia Sivana is a character appearing in American comic books published by DC Comics.

Beautia Sivana is the daughter of Thaddeus Sivana, the brother of Magnificus Sivana, and the half-sister of Georgia Sivana and Thaddeus Sivana Jr.

In post-Crisis continuity, Beautia's family connection is the same with her mother being Venus Sivana. She works as a teacher and social worker.

== Georgia Sivana ==
Georgia Sivana is the daughter of Thaddeus Sivana, the brother of Thaddeus Sivana Jr., and the half-sister of Magnificus Sivana and Beautia Sivana. She serves as one of Mary Marvel's primary enemies.

In "52", Georgia Sivana's family connection remains intact with her stepmother being Venus Sivana.

In "Infinite Frontier", Georgia was first indirectly mentioned in regards to Doctor Sivana's family, with Thaddeus being depicted as a respected scientist whom was desperate to save his family from an unknown plight and turns to magic, leading up discovering Black Adam's tomb and freeing him. The character would not make an appearance until The New Champion of Shazam! #2, introduced first as Doctor G. before being latered revealed as Dr. Georgia Sivana, P.h.D. In this new reality, Georgia was a respected professor of archaeology at Harvard University whose reputation is tainted due to her father's obsession with magic, which subjected her to ridicule and termination as a professor in Harvard. Seeking to elevate herself further, she began experimenting with merging magic and science in order to create magi-tech, turning to criminal methods to acquire test subjects. This placed her at odds with the superhero Mary Marvel, whom she learns is one of her prospective students she sought as a teaching assistant.

== Magnificus Sivana ==
Magnificus Sivana is a character appearing in comic books published by DC Comics.

Magnificus Sivana is the son of Thaddeus Sivana, the brother of Beautia Sivana, and the half-brother of Georgia Sivana and Thaddeus Sivana Jr.

In post-Crisis continuity, Magnificus' family connection remains the same with his mother being Venus Sivana. He is shown to work as an astronaut.

== Thaddeus Sivana Jr. ==
Thaddeus Sivana Jr. is a character appearing in comic books published by DC Comics.

Thaddeus Sivana Jr. is the son of Thaddeus Sivana, the sister of Georgia Sivana, and the half-brother of Beautia Sivana and Magificus Sivana. While his father would go up against Captain Marvel, Thaddeus Jr. would go up against Captain Marvel Jr.

In "52", Thaddeus Sivana Jr.'s family connection remains the same with his stepmother being Venus Sivana.

=== Thaddeus Sivana Jr. in other media ===
- Thaddues Sivana Jr. appears in The Kid Super Power Hour with Shazam!.
- Thaddues Sivana Jr. appears in the Batman: The Brave and the Bold episode "The Power of Shazam", voiced by Jim Piddock.

== Skeeter ==
- First appearance: Action Comics Annual #1 (October 1987)
- Created by: John Byrne and Art Adams
- Aliases: Skeeter

Skeeter (Ellie Mae Skaggs) is a character appearing in American comic books published by DC Comics.

Skeeter was a girl turned into vampire in 1865. As vampire she has superhuman strength and speed, psychic powers and the ability to transform into a more monstrous form.

== Stretch Skinner ==
Hiram "Stretch" Skinner is a character appearing in comic books published by DC Comics.

Stretch Skinner is a novice private eye detective who is unnaturally tall and thin. He would become the sidekick of Wildcat.

== Skorpio ==
Skorpio (Dennis Ellis) was a Garden State Medical Center resident who was recruited by Arthur Villain to serve as his bodyguard. He was given an outfit and some weaponry to do Arthur's bidding which led to his first encounter with Steel.

== Skyhook ==
Skyhook (Aleister Hook) is a character appearing in American comic books published by DC Comics. He first appeared in Superman (vol. 2) #15 and was created by John Byrne.

Hook is a century old physician turned criminal based in London who uses children to commit crimes. He was turned into a winged demon by Blaze and is able to transform others into a similar form.

=== Skyhook in other media ===
Aleister Hook appears in Superman & Lois, portrayed by Shekhar Paleja. This version is an Intergang scientist who, among others, is charged by Bruno Mannheim to experiment on corpses as well as make use of Superman's blood samples. Hook is later killed by Otis Grisham off-screen while obtaining information about Bizarro.

== Skyman ==
Skyman is the name of several characters in DC Comics.

=== Klar-Don ===
Klar-Don is a Kryptonian who was Superman's predecessor in fighting crime on Earth before the destruction of Krypton. When crimefighting, he operated under the alias of "Skyman". Superman learned of Skyman when Professor Hugo Blaine mentally sent Superman back in time where he experienced the lives of his Kryptonian genetic doubles.

=== Jacob Colby ===
Jacob Colby is one of the first official subjects for Lex Luthor's "Everyman Project". Luthor's project grants superpowers to Colby who is given the codename "Skyman" after Luthor buys the rights to Infinity, Inc. from the Pemberton estate. This Skyman had the power to control the air and the power of flight. Colby later is romantically involved with his teammate Starlight.

Colby is killed by his teammate Everyman who consumes his body and assumes his form.

== Jubal Slade ==
Jubal Slade is a character appearing in comic books published by DC Comics. He was created by writer Dennis O'Neil and artist Neal Adams, and first appeared in Green Lantern vol. 2 #76 (April 1970).

== Garrison Slate ==
- First appearance: Blue Beetle (vol. 6) #12
- Created by: Len Wein, Joey Cavalieri and Paris Cullins

Garrison Slate is a character appearing in comic books published by DC Comics. Created by Len Wein, Joey Cavalieri, and Paris Cullins, he first appeared in Blue Beetle (vol. 6) #12.

Garrison Slate is the founder of S.T.A.R. Labs.

=== Garrison Slate in other media ===
Elements of the character are incorporated into the Arrowverse character Harrison Wells in The Flash.

== Sledge ==
Sledge is a genetically enhanced supersoldier who the top secret government organization Quorum designed for the United States army with the experiments giving him super-strength and invulnerability. Because of his instability, he was put on a deep freeze. When Sledge was released, he vowed revenge on America and fought Guy Gardner who managed to defeat him with help from Superman and Steel. Quorum operatives posing as government agents picked up the unconscious Sledge.

During the "Infinite Crisis" storyline, Sledge appears as a member of Alexander Luthor Jr.'s Secret Society of Super Villains.

== Sleepwalk ==
Sleepwalk (Holly McKenzie) was a member of the Brotherhood of Dada gathered by Mr. Nobody and took the name of Sleepwalk. She was a British girl with superhuman strength, but only when she was asleep. To avoid waking, she took sleeping pills and wore headphones that played Barry Manilow music, literally sleepwalking while committing crimes.

=== Sleepwalk in other media ===
Sleepwalk appears in the third season of Doom Patrol, portrayed by Anita Kalathara.

== Smart Bomb ==
Smart Bomb is the name of several characters in DC Comics.

=== Kellogg ===
Kellogg is a man in a flying powered exoskeleton who is sent crashing into the streets by Catwoman who warns him to stay out of the East End. Catwoman later speculated that Smart Bomb worked for Black Mask.

Smart Bomb is later interrogated by detectives James Lenahan and Carl Worth. When Sam Bradley Jr. came in, Smart Bomb tried to use his suit's gun only to be shot by Lenahan and Worth.

== August Smith ==
August "Auggie" Smith is a character appearing in comic books published by DC Comics. He is the father of Christopher Smith / Peacemaker.

The character first appeared in a cameo in Peacemaker #4 (1967) as an unnamed American.

The character officially appeared in Peacemaker vol. 2 #1 (1988) as Wolfgang "Wolf" Schmidt, a German Nazi. After his past is exposed, Wolf commits suicide in front of his son, who later has hallucinations of his father.

The character is revamped in Peacemaker Tries Hard! #1 (2023) as an abusive father to his son. This version is based on the character's portrayal in the Peacemaker television series.

=== August Smith in other media ===
The character appears in Peacemaker, portrayed by Robert Patrick. This version is the father of Christopher "Chris" Smith / Peacemaker and Keith Smith.

- The "main" universe version primarily appears in the first season as a white American supremacist and former vigilante known as the White Dragon. Despite viewing Chris as a disappointment due to Keith's accidental death, Auggie maintains a secret armory for Chris in his home. He's framed for crimes that Chris committed. While in prison, Auggie is hailed by fellow white supremacists before being released upon providing proof of his innocence. He subsequently leads his followers in attempting to kill Chris, only for the 11th Street Kids to kill his followers while Chris kills Auggie. Nonetheless, his son is later haunted by hallucinations and flashbacks of him.
- An alternate universe doppelgänger appears in the second season as the Blue Dragon, a vigilante and the Top Trio's leader who is later killed by Vigilante.

== Elizabeth Smith ==
Elizabeth Smith (also known as Elizabeth Lewis) is a character appearing in comic books published by DC Comics. Created by Paul Kupperberg and Tod Smith, the character first appeared in Peacemaker vol. 2 #1 (January 1988).

Elizabeth is the mother of Christopher Smith / Peacemaker. She was a rich artist who tried to instill good values before passing.

The character returns to her son's origin story where she's remarried with a second husband and additional children before committing suicide.

== Keith Smith ==
Keith Smith is a character appearing in comic books published by DC Comics. Created by Dennis O'Neil and Jordan B. Gorfinkel, the character first appeared in Batman: Shadow of the Bat #75 (January 1998). Keith is Walter Smith's paraplegic son who is killed due to an earthquake.

=== Keith Smith in other media ===
An unrelated character named Keith Smith appears in Peacemaker, with the "main" version portrayed by Liam Hughes as a child, and alternate universe versions portrayed by David Denman as an adult and by Bryson Haney as a child. This version is the older brother of Chris Smith / Peacemaker and the eldest son of August Smith.

- The first season reveals (via flashbacks) that the "main" version accidentally died in a childhood bare-knuckle match.
- Alternate universe counterparts of Keith appear in the second season.

== Walter Smith ==
Walter Smith is a character appearing in comic books published by DC Comics. Created by Dennis O'Neil and Jordan B. Gorfinkel, the character first appeared in Batman: Shadow of the Bat #75 (April 1998). Smith is a regular citizen who loses his family due to an earthquake so he tries commit suicide, but Batman saves him.

== Lawrence Snart ==
Lawrence Snart is a character appearing in comic books published by DC Comics. The character, created by Geoff Johns and Scott Kolins, first appeared in The Flash vol. 2 #182 (March 2002). He is the estranged father of Captain Cold and Golden Glider.

=== Lawrence Snart in other media ===
- The character appears in media set in the Arrowverse renamed Lewis Snart.
  - Snart first appears in The Flash episode "Family of Rogues", portrayed by Michael Ironside.
  - A younger version of Snart appears in the Legends of Tomorrow episode "Blood Ties", portrayed by Jason Beaudoin.

== Bethany Snow ==
Bethany Snow is a character appearing in American comic books published by DC Comics. She debuted in New Teen Titans #22 and was created by Marv Wolfman and George Pérez.

Bethany Snow is a WUBC reporter in New York City who is secretly a member of the Church of Blood. She uses her job effectively to help Brother Blood discredit the Teen Titans.

In 2011, "The New 52" rebooted the DC universe. Snow is depicted as the lead anchor for Channel 52.

=== Bethany Snow in other media ===
- Bethany Snow appears in media set in the Arrowverse, portrayed by Keri Adams.
  - Snow appears in Arrow.
  - Snow appears in The Flash episode "Flashpoint".
  - Snow appears in the Legends of Tomorrow episode "Freakshow".

== Sobek ==
Sobek is a humanoid Nile crocodile who was originally believed to have been created in Doctor Sivana's lab. Sobek is found in Sivana's residence, claiming to be a Nile crocodile Sivana got from the Nile and experimented on before he escaped from his cage in Sivana's lab and befriended by Osiris. He is named Sobek after the Egyptian crocodile-headed god, claiming he does not have a name. From then on, Sobek puts on a facade of cowardice and timidness to fool everyone around him. When Osiris suffers despondency after accidentally killing Persuader and thinks his powers are evil and are causing the disasters in Kahndaq, Sobek convinces him to give up his powers. Once Osiris becomes human, Sobek quickly devours him.

Soon after, Sobek is revealed to be Yurrd the Unknown, one of the Four Horsemen of Apokolips, who represents famine. In the ensuing battle, Yurrd is killed by Black Adam.

Yurrd returns in the miniseries 52 Aftermath: The Four Horsemen, where he manifests in Bialya. Yurrd takes on his true form during these events, now resembling a humanoid hyena with cybernetic parts. Yurrd's essence is absorbed into a bio-containment unit that is taken in by Veronica Cale.

== Safiyah Sohail ==
Safiyah Sohail is a character appearing in comic books published by DC Comics. Safiyah Sohail is depicted as the former lover of Kate Kane and the overseer of the pirate nation of Coryana.

=== Safiyah Sohail in other media ===
Safiyah Sohail appears in Batwoman, portrayed by Shivaani Ghai. This version is served by the Rifle and the Many Arms of Death. She also has a history with Alice, having found her after she had escaped from August Cartwright and with whom she shares a mutual hatred towards Catherine Hamilton-Kane, and is connected to Black Mask.

== Son of Pyg ==
Son of Pyg is a character appearing in comic books published by DC Comics.

Janosz "Johnny" Valentin is the son of Professor Pyg. Batwoman was investigating the murders of three marines that he killed on behalf of a group of Argentinian criminals.

Son of Pyg was revealed to be an operative of Leviathan who oversaw the initiation of Leviathan's recruits. He interrogates Stephanie Brown and Jolisa Windsor and claims that one of them betrayed Saint Hadrian's Finishing School for Girls. When Son of Pyg threatens Jolisa, Stephanie frees herself and saves Jolisa. Both of them go on the run with Son of Pyg and the Leviathan girls in hot pursuit. As Stephanie as Batgirl gets Jolisa down to the courtyard, Son of Pyg catches up to them and is knocked out by the gardener, who is revealed to be a disguised Batman.

== Johnny Sorrow ==
Johnny Sorrow is a character appearing in comic books published by DC Comics.

Formerly a silent film actor, Sorrow is forced into retirement by the new "talkies" and turned to crime. Sorrow steals a "Subspace Prototype" that enabled him to become intangible by warping through another dimension. During an encounter with the Justice Society of America, Sandy destroys the Subspace Prototype, which tears Sorrow apart and transports his remains to another dimension called the Subtle Realms. A Lovecraftian entity called the "King of Tears" discovers Sorrow and gives him a golden mask that enables him to regain his physical form. Sorrow's face, warped beyond description, instantly kills anyone who sees it. Sorrow later becomes the leader of the Injustice Society.

Following the "DC Rebirth" relaunch, Sorrow is depicted as a former member of Amanda Waller's Suicide Squad. In the series JSA, Sorrow appears as a member of Scandal Savage's Injustice Society.

== Sorrow Lantern ==
Sorrow Lantern (Nathan Allen Broome) is a character appearing in comic books published by DC Comics.

Nathan Broome was Carol Ferris’ boyfriend and later fianceé. The two were to be married before she left him at the altar to save Hal Jordan. As a result, he infused his ring with sadness and became the Sorrow Lantern. As the Sorrow Lantern, he has the ability to force sorrow onto others via gray mist emitted from his body.

== Sparkler ==
Sparkler is a member of the Force of July, a government-sponsored superhero team. He first appeared in Batman and the Outsiders Annual #1 (1984). He is killed by Doctor Light of the Suicide Squad during the Janus Directive event.

Sparkler is resurrected in the Infinite Frontier relaunch, where he is recruited by the Penguin.

== Sparky ==
Sparky is the name of two characters in DC Comics.

=== Sparkington J. Northrup ===
Sparkington J. Northrup is a teenager who was the sidekick of Blue Beetle.

In the series "The New Golden Age", Sparky is among the Lost Children, a group of sidekicks who were captured by Childminder. Sparky and Pinky the Whiz Kid are later freed by Red Arrow and Boom. Sparky and the Lost Children are brought to the present day by Hourman, as returning them to their own times would cause a time paradox.

=== Freedom Fighters villain ===
An unnamed comic fan is among those who were recruited into the Crusaders by Silver Ghost. As Sparky, he possessed pyrokinesis.

== Sparrow ==
Sparrow is the name of several characters in DC Comics.

=== First Sparrow ===
The first incarnation of Sparrow was created by writer Joseph Samachson and artist Pen Shumaker, and first appeared in Adventure Comics vol. 1 #99 (August 1945).

Sparrow is a gangster who was released form prison and started robbing other criminals which led to him running afoul of Sandman and Sandy the Golden Boy.

=== Ambrose Weems ===
The second incarnation of Sparrow, named Ambrose Weems, was created by writer Jerry Coleman and artist Sheldon Moldoff, and first appeared in Batman vol. 1 #149 (August 1962).

Ambrose Weems is a music book writer who once helped Batman deal with Maestro and wore a sparrow costume. He retired from this identity when Maestro was defeated.

=== Third Sparrow ===
The third incarnation of Sparrow was created by writer E. Nelson Bridwell and artist Joe Orlando, and first appeared in Showcase #63 (August 1966).

On Earth-Twelve, Sparrow is an archery villain who worked with villains like Masked Swastika, Silver Sorceress, and Speed Demon during World War II. With help from Silver Sorceress' rejuvenating potion 20 years later, Sparrow and his fellow villains formed Vendetta and targeted Bowman's son White Feather. The villains were defeated by the Freedom Brigade.

=== Darcy Thomas ===
The fourth incarnation of Sparrow, named Darcy Thomas, was created by writer Meghan Fitzmartin and artist Eddy Barrows, and first appeared in Batman Secret Files: The Signal #1 (September 2021).

Darcy Thomas is a former initiate of We Are Robin with multilingualism and expert hand-to-hand combat skills who helps Tim Drake in solving mysteries in Gotham City.

== Speed Demon ==
Speed Demon is an alias used by several characters in DC Comics. Several versions of the character are enemies of the Flash.

=== Jimmy Olsen ===
The first incarnation, Jimmy Olsen, first appeared in Superman's Pal Jimmy Olsen #15 (September 1956).

=== Jerry McGee ===
The second incarnation, Dr. Jerry McGee, was created by Mike Baron and Jackson Guice, and first appeared in The Flash (vol. 2) #5 (October 1987). He is Tina McGee's husband who worked for S.T.A.R. Labs.

McGee created the performance enhancer B-19 in order to be a speedster and a personal suit for endurance to have confrontations with Wally West which exacerbated paranoia towards Conrad Bortz and is an abusive spouse before his body give out due to steroid abuse. Afterwards, he managed to detox and recover thanks to Blue Trinity's Pytor Orloff, made up with his wife, and assisted the Flash in dealing with speedsters utilized with Vandal Savage's addictive performance enhancer Velocity.

=== Speed Demon in other media ===
- An original incarnation of Speed Demon appears in the second season of The Flash as an alternate alias for Zoom.
- An original incarnation of Speed Demon appears as an alternate alias for Professor Zoom / Reverse-Flash in Injustice 2.

== Speedy ==
Speedy is the name of two characters appearing in comic books published by DC Comics.

== Spellbinder ==
Spellbinder is the name of several characters in DC Comics.

=== Delbert Billings ===
Delbert Billings first appeared in Detective Comics #358 (December 1966), and was created by John Broome and Sheldon Moldoff. He is a painter who used optical illusions and hypnotic weapons to commit crimes.

Spellbinder joins a loosely knit conglomerate of crime organized by the Monarch of Menace. He is the first member of the group to be captured by Batman who later disguises himself as Spellbinder to infiltrate the group and capture Monarch.

=== Fay Moffitt ===
During the Underworld Unleashed storyline, Spellbinder is on the run from the law with his girlfriend, Fay Moffit, when they are confronted by Neron. Neron offers Spellbinder power in exchange for his soul, but he rejects the offer. Moffit kills Spellbinder by shooting him in the head and takes the deal for herself. Neron is unsurprised, having intended to give Moffit power all along. Neron grants Moffit the ability to induce genuine hallucinations, which are nullified if her eyes are covered or closed.

During the Infinite Crisis storyline, Spellbinder is killed by Vigilante and Wild Dog.

=== Unnamed version ===
An unidentified Spellbinder appears in Justice League International (vol. 2) #65 as a member of the government-sanctioned "League-Busters".

=== Viktor Mironov ===
A fourth Spellbinder, Viktor Mironov, is introduced in The New 52. Mironov, as the Spellbinder, is a Russian magician known for his ability to use magic to attack a person's psyche. When John Constantine contacts him to recruit him in a plan to fight the Cult of the Cold Flame, Spellbinder initially reacts by attacking Constantine and rummaging through his mind. When Spellbinder discovers that Constantine is sincere, he agrees to the plan. However, a spell gone wrong by Papa Midnite sends the entire plan into shambles. Constantine is sent to the wrong time period to fight the Cult. Without Constantine's guidance, Spellbinder and another mage are killed fighting the Cold Flame.

=== Charles Dante ===
A fifth Spellbinder, Charles Dante, is introduced in Infinite Frontier. He is an artist, psychiatrist, and former classmate of Barbara Gordon who seeks to free Gotham City's citizens from what he sees as brainwashing.

=== Spellbinder in other media ===
- An original incarnation of Spellbinder, Ira Billings, appears in Batman Beyond, voiced by Jon Cypher. This version is a psychologist who wears a suit featuring an orange-and-black swirl design and uses a large floating "eyeball" that allows him to project mental illusions via hypnosis and virtual technology.
- The unnamed incarnation of Spellbinder appears in The Batman, voiced by Michael Massee. This version has a third eye, which he acquired via meditation and allows him to induce hallucinations.

== Amanda Spence ==
Amanda Spence is a character appearing in comic books published by DC Comics. She was created by writer Ron Marz and artist Ramon Bernado, first appearing in Superboy (vol. 4) #32 (October 1996).

Spence is an operative of the Agenda, a secret organization akin to Project Cadmus. Under the guise of a reporter, she tricks Tana Moon into telling her details regarding Superboy's origin and powers. Spence later kidnaps Superboy and has the Agenda create Match, a clone of Superboy who possesses superior knowledge and powers. When Superboy accidentally triggers a reactor in the Agenda's base, he rescues Spence from the explosion. Match refuses to be saved and is presumed dead. Spence is later revealed to be the daughter of Paul Westfield, founder of Cadmus. During the "Our Worlds at War" storyline, Spence is revealed to have begun working for the US government and has been converted into a cyborg.

=== Amanda Spence in other media ===
Amanda Spence appears in Young Justice, voiced by Vanessa Marshall. This version is a leading member of Project Cadmus.

== Horten Spence ==
Horten Spence is a character appearing in American comic books published by DC Comics.

Horten Spence is a photojournalist at the Gothamite News who is paired up with Vicki Vale. They are sent to investigate the Fever phenomenon. While scouting out the buildings, they run into several members of the Street Demonz. They attack Vale, but Spence protects her. Vale kisses Spence as Batman swings overhead.

=== Horten Spence in other media ===
Horten Spence appears in the Batwoman episode "Time Off for Good Behavior", portrayed by Jaime Callica. This version is a former reporter for the Gotham Gazette.

== Spin ==
Spin is a character appearing in comic books published by DC Comics. He first appearing in The Flash (vol. 2) #238 (May 2008).

Mr. Auerbach was the son of a media mogul whose holdings included the cable news network KN News. He pursued a career in journalism, hoping to work his way up in his father's company. While working on a story, he met Edwar Martinez who was capable of sensing the fears in others and making them a reality. Auerbach eventually was put in charge of KN News, where he had a hand in determining much of the content that the network covered. He also led a double life as the villain Spin. He kept Edwar captive in the basement of the new building, hooking his hostage up to machines and forcing to watch the news coverage. In this setting, Spin was able to channel and direct Edwar's amazing ability. His first caper was stealing a Fabergé egg from a local auction. He created a distraction by summoning earthquakes, which had been in the public's mind due to a recent quake in Hub City. He took advantage of a comment made on television by the Flash expressing financial woes. After the citizens of Keystone City started to feel some doubt about their local hero, Spin lured the Flash to the Keystone City Salamanders stadium and forced the Flash to steal many valuables from the fans there. This causes a massive public outcry against the Flash, which Spin enhances with the speedster's powers, even turning the original Flash against his successor. When Spin and Edwar realized that the Flash had identified the source of the disturbances as emanating from KN News, he used his abilities to summon Gorilla Grodd to Keystone City, the Rogue which Edwar sensed would make the speedster most anxious. Grodd, however, was not pleased with the sudden teleportation and a massive battle ensued. In the chaos, Edwar was released from his machinery and his powers went completely out of control, causing citizens to act out nearly every situation that is mentioned in the media.

=== Spin in other media ===
A character loosely based on Spin, Spencer Young, appears in The Flash episode "News Flash", portrayed by Kiana Madeira. The version is a young millennial who used to work with Iris West-Allen as a reporter before quitting her job to create a blog about metahuman news called the "Spyn Zone". After it was hit by debris from Thinker's Enlightenment satellite, Young's smartphone becomes capable of controlling people's minds by writing about their actions. After XS appears in Central City, Young uses the speedster to manufacture disasters to which she reports on before happening to increase her blog's popularity. However, her plan is eventually thwarted by Flash and she is remanded to Iron Heights Penitentiary.

== Splitshot ==
Splitshot was a supervillain and member of the Superior Five. He was a sinister counterpart of White Feather of the Inferior Five. Together with his teammates, he was exiled on Cygnus 4019.

== Stalnoivolk ==
- First appearance: Firestorm the Nuclear Man #67 (January 1988)
- Created by: John Ostrander and Joe Brozowski
- Abilities: Superhuman strength, durability and longevity
- Aliases: Ivan Illyich Gort
- Further reading: Stalnoivolk at the Comic Book DB (archived from the original); Stalnoivolk at the Grand Comics Database

Stalnoivolk (Стальнойволк or "Steelwolf") is a character appearing in comic books published by DC Comics. The character first appeared in Firestorm the Nuclear Man #67 (January 1988) and was created by John Ostrander and Joe Brozowski.

Ivan Illyich Gort is a Russian who underwent government experiments during World War II. He loyally serves the Soviet Union under the codename "Stalnoivolk" as a symbol of Russia's resistance to Nazi Germany. After the death of Joseph Stalin, he is exiled to Siberia for his participation in the purging of Ukraine.

He is reactivated just before the Soviet Union dissolves by Major Zastrow, leader of the Red Shadows. Initially, he is tasked with eliminating Firestorm, which becomes a mission that he cannot complete. He also encounters the Suicide Squad more than once.

== Star Sapphire ==
Star Sapphire is the name of several characters in DC Comics; many of them are villainous, and all connected in origin. Within DC continuity, an immortal race of warrior women (the Zamarons) were depicted as having the ancient tradition of choosing physically identical mortals from across the cosmos to serve as the host body for their queen. The woman chosen to serve this queen is called "Star Sapphire". She is given the queen's symbolic weapon: a crystal resembling an actual star sapphire that grants the user powers similar to the power ring of Green Lanterns.

The Star Sapphires are one of the seven Corps empowered by a specific color of the emotional spectrum within the DC Universe. The character Star Sapphire was introduced in 1962, with the Star Sapphires group being introduced in the 2009–2010 Blackest Night storyline. First formed by the Zamarons at the conclusion of the Mystery of the Star Sapphire storyline running in Green Lantern (vol. 4) issues #18–20 (May–July 2007), their abilities are derived from the violet light of love. Initially the members of the Star Sapphires were only depicted as being females, during the Blackest Night panel at the 2009 San Diego Comic-Con, Geoff Johns explained that: "anyone can join, but most men are not worthy." More recently male recruits were shown among the Star Sapphires when Wonder Woman visited their home planet.

The original Star Sapphire's powers are vast. She is equipped with an arsenal of weapons, including a replicate Zamaron star sapphire, of unknown origin. She also has a variety of personal powers, though whether they stem from herself or her personal armament is unclear. She is also able to access the memories of the Zamorans regarding the Star Sapphire gem, such as the experiences of other wearers. As with the powers of the woman bearing the title of Star Sapphire, the limitations of the Star Sapphire gem are also unclear. Psychologically, the women serving as Star Sapphire have displayed a bizarre preoccupation with gender, suspected of reflecting a pathological fear of men. They also have had a less than accurate grasp of the variations in physics between dimensions. They are sometimes foiled primarily due to their own overconfidence. The Star Sapphire gems used to power the original incarnations of Star Sapphire were used by the Zamarons to create the main violet Power Battery. Their powers include invulnerability, flight at light speed, superhuman strength and telekinesis.

=== Golden Age version ===
The first version of the character appears in All-Flash Comics #32 (Dec–Jan 1947) and Comic Cavalcade #29 (Oct–Nov 1948) and battles the Golden Age Flash. This Star Sapphire claims to be a queen from the 7th Dimension and attempts to conquer Earth by destroying all the plant life, which would cause the world to run out of oxygen.

A later retcon connects her with the Zamaron Star Sapphires, explaining that she had been chosen as Queen of the Zamarons, but had proved unworthy, hence her banishment to the 7th dimension. In this story, she attempts to manipulate Carol Ferris into using the Star Sapphire stone to destroy the Zamarons. The Flash is able to break the connection. This was the Golden Age character's sole modern appearance.

=== Dela Pharon ===
Dela Pharon was introduced as the third woman to hold the position of Star Sapphire in Green Lantern (vol. 2) #41 (December 1965). Technically speaking, however, Carol Ferris simultaneously appears as Star Sapphire in the same issue.

In the story, Ferris is injured testing out one of her new flying machines, and is brought to the hospital for treatment. However, she awakens and finds herself drawn away from the hospital. It is shown that Ferris is being lured off by the Star Sapphire gem, and upon finding it she once again takes on the mantle of Star Sapphire. As Star Sapphire she returns to pursuing her quest to marry Green Lantern; however, conflict arises with the arrival of an alien woman who also appears to be the Zamaron's queen and Star Sapphire. Jordan discovers Ferris' transformation upon finding her fighting the second, alien, Star Sapphire. The Zamarons arrive to meet Jordan and explain that Dela Pharon (from the planet Xanador) is the woman that Ferris is fighting.

Before the events of the issue, the Zamarons chose Pharon as their new queen and recipient of the Star Sapphire, but a dissenting group of Zamarons claimed that Ferris would have made a superior queen. Angered by the opposition, Pharon travels to Earth and attacks Ferris in retaliation (which was the cause of her aircraft malfunction). Recognizing the attack provokes Ferris to become Star Sapphire again and defend herself. At the conclusion of their duel, Ferris appears to be the victor and leaves to challenge Jordan. Following his defeat, she forces him to travel with her to Zamaron and become her husband. Before the wedding, Jordan discovers that the woman he believed to be Ferris is really Pharon in disguise. Jordan finds the real Ferris living Pharon's life on Xanador, and brings her to Zamaron. He defeats Pharon and returns with Ferris to Earth without her retaining any knowledge of the events that transpired.

Dela Pharon reappears in a story told by Carol Ferris during the Mystery of the Star Sapphire story line. She continues to serve as Star Sapphire after her first appearance, and eventually both falls in love with and enslaves the Green Lantern of Xanador. After becoming his mate, she kills him and encases their planet in violet crystal.

=== Deborah Camille Darnell ===
Remoni-Notra, of the planet Pandina, is chosen by the Zamarons to be their queen, an honor previously bequeathed upon Earth's Carol Ferris, but refuses. Remoni-Notra is given one of the five star sapphire gems and is told of the existence of the other four. Using her powers, she comes to Earth to locate and steal Carol Ferris' gem and joins the Secret Society of Super Villains as the new Star Sapphire in hopes of finding a clue to the gem. On Earth, she takes the name Deborah Camille Darnell and becomes a stewardess at Ferris Aircraft, in hopes of getting closer to Carol and the Star Sapphire gem. As Star Sapphire, Darnell can use her gem of power to fly and to hurl blasts of force nearly equal to the power of a Green Lantern's ring. Moreover, the Sapphire bestows upon her a certain amount of invulnerability and allows her to survive in airless space.

As Debbie Darnell, she often dates long-time hero Captain Comet. She also portrays a French real estate agent named Camille on Earth. She is later mind-wiped and put in a coma. She was most likely mind-wiped at the request of Green Lantern Hal Jordan to protect Carol Ferris. She is revived by her teammates in the Secret Society.

In Geoff Johns' run on "Green Lantern", her origin is rebooted: she is presented as a flight attendant who dated Hal Jordan when he broke up with Carol Ferris and, thus, was chosen to be the new Star Sapphire, since the crystal is used to possess Hal's girlfriends. Later, in Infinite Crisis #6, several magic-users assemble at Stonehenge and summon the Spectre. He singles out Darnell, condemns her, transforms her into a star sapphire and shatters her, killing her.

=== Nol-Anj ===
A new villainous Star Sapphire debuts in Green Lantern (vol. 5) #21 (August 2013). Prixiam Nol-Anj was previously imprisoned on Oa for a slew of crimes: racketeering, smuggling, extortion, murder, abduction, trafficking, larceny, grand theft starship, and assault. Over time, she uses her wiles to beguile her guard, a Green Lantern named Cossite, who falls in love with her. When Larfleeze attacks Oa in the aftermath of the First Lantern's defeat and the death of the Guardians, his constructs kill a Star Sapphire who arrived to aid in the defense of the planet. The fallen Sapphire's ring flies to Nol-Anj's cell, where it declares her eligible to become a Star Sapphire herself. Nol-Anj persuades Cossite that the ring's presence is proof that her love for him is true. He readily opens the door and allows her to slip the ring onto her fingers and acquire its power. Nol-Anj kills Cossite, declaring that the love in her heart that the ring detected was not for him, but for the Clann she belonged to, that accepted her when no one else would.

After Larfleeze's attack is thwarted, Hal Jordan and the rest of the Lanterns discover Cossite's body and learn of Nol-Anj's escape, who had by then commandeered a spacecraft and left for space sector 0563. This is the home base for her clann, the Braidmen, a group of scavengers and contraband pirates, of which she is the "Prixiam". As Prixiam, she serves similarly as would a queen. The love for her clann is so potent, Nol-Anj has been shown to have the ability to extend her violet powers to shatter green constructs and summon/control multiple members of the Braidmen across great distances.

== Starling ==
- First appearance: Birds of Prey (vol. 3) #1 (November 2011)
- Created by: Duane Swierczynski, Jesús Saíz
- Teams: Birds of Prey
- Further reading: Starling at Comic Vine; Starling at League of Comic Geeks; Starling at DC Database

Starling (Evelyn Crawford) is a character appearing in comic books published by DC Comics.

In September 2011, The New 52 rebooted DC's continuity. In this new timeline, Evelyn Crawford is introduced as part of the relaunch of Birds of Prey as a highly skilled hand-to-hand combatant and markswoman who has been friends with the Black Canary since they worked undercover together at the Penguin's Iceberg Lounge. She is later chosen by the Black Canary to help reform the Birds of Prey but later betrays the group. She was killed trying to escape a burning building after a battle with the Court of Owls when Canary unleashed her Canary Cry.

=== Starling in other media ===
A variation of Evelyn Crawford named Evelyn Crawford Sharp appears in Arrow, portrayed by Madison McLaughlin. This version was a star student and gymnast before her family became H.I.V.E. test subjects, of which she was the only survivor. First appearing in the season four episode "Canary Cry", she assumes the identity of Black Canary to seek revenge on the killer, Damien Darhk until Oliver Queen convinces her to stop to avoid tarnishing the Black Canary's reputation. In season five, she joins Queen's team of vigilantes as "Artemis", but eventually betrays them to serve as Prometheus' double agent upon learning of Queen's violent past. As part of Prometheus' plans, Evelyn frees Laurel Lance's villainous Earth-2 counterpart before joining her and Talia al Ghul in kidnapping Queen's friends and family to hold them hostage on Lian Yu. While working to stop Prometheus, Queen throws Evelyn in a cage, intending to come back for her. However, she is not seen again and her fate is unclear.

== Steadfast ==
Steadfast is a character appearing in comic books published by DC Comics. The character first appeared in The Flash (vol. 5) #69 (June 2019), and was created by Joshua Williamson and Rafa Sandoval.

He is an unnamed solitary man who is empowered by the Still Force which granted him motion-negating abilities, similar to Fuerza and Psych. Steadfast's time abilities help Barry Allen to save the Multiverse. Steadfast is seemingly killed by the Black Flash, but survived thanks to the Flash, Kid Flash and Avery Ho. However, his abilities are absorbed by Hunter Zolomon.

=== Steadfast in other media ===
A variation of Steadfast named Deon Owens appears in The Flash, portrayed by Christian Magby. This version is a citizen of Masonville who was previously a football player before suffering a career-ending knee injury and can manipulate time using the Still Force. Introduced in the seventh season, he is intimated by the Speed Force before he decides to help Barry Allen, Fuerza and Psych in humbling the Speed Force and bringing balance to the universe. In the eighth season, Deon helps Iris West-Allen with a time sickness before getting sick himself to which the Negative Still Force steals his likeness until he recovers.

== Clarissa Stein ==
Clarissa Stein is a character appearing in comic books published by DC Comics. The character was created by Gerry Conway and Pat Broderick, and first appeared in Firestorm (vol. 2) #10 (March 1983). She is the estranged wife of Martin Stein.

=== Clarissa Stein in other media ===
Clarissa Stein appears in TV series set in the Arrowverse. She appears in The Flash and Legends of Tomorrow, portrayed by Isabella Hofmann, Chanelle Stevenson and Emily Tennant. This version lives in Central City and displays a loving relationship with Martin Stein.

== Sting ==
Sting is the name of several characters in DC Comics.

=== First version ===
The first Sting is a gangster who is an enemy of Tarantula.

=== Ronald Sweet ===
Ronald Sweet is a criminal who is an old friend of Blacksnake and has control over his bee robots. After Atom takes down Blacksnake, he faces off against Sting. Once Atom destroys his robotic bees, Sting surrenders.

During the "Infinite Crisis" storyline, Sting appears as a member of Alexander Luthor Jr.'s Secret Society of Super Villains.

== Stitch ==
- First appearance: Teen Titans Academy #1 (2021)
- Created by: Tim Sheridan & Rafa Sandoval
- Species: Magically animated ragdoll
- Teams: Teen Titans; Titans Academy; Young Justice Dark; Partners: Doctor Fate (Khalid Nassour); Salem the Witch Girl
- Abilities: Skilled magic user; ability to break the fourth wall

Stitch is a superhero appearing in comic books published by DC Comics. Created by Tim Sheridan and Rafa Sandoval, the character first appeared in Teen Titans Academy #1 (2021). A non-binary effigy and apprentice to the modern Doctor Fate (Khalid Nassour), Stitch possesses magical abilities, but due to the character's jovial, light-hearted personality and ability to break the fourth wall, they are comparable to Marvel Comics' Deadpool.

In the Teen Titans Academy series, some time after Nassour's ascension as the sole Doctor Fate and Nelson's death, Stitch is taken in as his new apprentice, establishes a parent-child bond with him, and is sent to Teen Titan Academy to learn the meaning of being a hero. While doubting themselves initially, Stitch's magical powers and saving students from accidental death makes them a popular student and class president. Stitch also becomes embodied in dilemmas involving the super-villain Red X. Later sometime after the disillusion of Titans Academy, Stitch helps other LGBT-related superheroes against the magical forces of the Crimson Flame, the opposite of the Starheart.

=== Stitch in other media ===
Stitch appears as an unlockable character in DC Legends. This version is the apprentice of Kent Nelson.

== Elinore Stone ==
Elinore Stone is a character appearing in comic books published by DC Comics. She was created by Marv Wolfman and George Pérez, and first appeared in The New Teen Titans #7 (1981).

Elinore Stone is the mother of Victor Stone / Cyborg, and a scientist at S.T.A.R. Labs. Elinore was killed in a lab accident that forced her husband Silas Stone to turn Victor into a cyborg.

=== Elinore Stone in other media ===
- Elinore Stone appears in Teen Titans Go! #45.
- Elinore Stone appears in Doom Patrol, portrayed by Charmin Lee.
- Elinore Stone appears in Zack Snyder's Justice League, portrayed by Karen Bryson.

== Mike Stone ==
Mike Stone is a character appearing in American comic books published by DC Comics.

Mike Stone is a former enforcer for the Penguin who has history with Joker and posed as a guard at Arkham Asylum.

=== Mike Stone in other media ===
Mikey Stone appears in The Penguin, portrayed by Joshua Bitton. This version is an enforcer and street dealer for Oz Cobb.

== Strata ==
Strata is an alien Dryad, a rock-like being, who was kidnapped by the Dominators as a slave. While imprisoned, she befriended Vril Dox, eventually becoming a founding member of Dox's teams, the L.E.G.I.O.N. and the R.E.B.E.L.S., and marrying fellow teammember, Garv.

== Suit ==
The Suit is a character appearing in comic books published by DC Comics. The character first appeared in The Flash (vol. 2) #130 (October 1997), and was created by Grant Morrison and Mark Millar.

Suit is a supersuit capable of possessing hosts. A serial killer named Dell Merriwether wore the Suit and was defeated by Barry Allen and Hal Jordan. He was sentenced to death by electrocution which resulted in an extradimensional parasitic entity taking control of the suit. Years later, the Suit returned by possessing multiple hosts, including one with limited time manipulation abilities, Max Mercury and Jay Garrick before being defeated by Wally West. The Suit is later shown to have survived.

== Donald Sullivan ==
Donald "Donny Boy" Sullivan is a character appearing in comic books published by DC Comics.

Donald Sullivan was the co-leader of the Sullivan Crime Family along with his younger brother Mickey Sullivan, hired by Carmine Falcone to kill Harvey Dent.

=== Donald Sullivan in other media ===
Donald Sullivan appears in The Penguin, portrayed by Johnny Hopkins. This version worked under Oz Cobb before he is killed by his second-in-command Victor Aguilar.

== Syl ==
Syl, also known as Sylvan Ortega, is a character appearing in comic books published by DC Comics. He first appeared in DC Pride #1 (June 2021).

Syl is a young magician and an apprentice of Gregorio de la Vega.

== Syonide ==
Syonide is the name of several characters in DC Comics.

=== Tomb Home inmate ===
The first Syonide appears in Sensation Comics #57.

Syonide is a homicidal maniac held at the "Tomb Home" for the criminally insane and has the delusional belief he is Chief Powhatan. After escaping, he caught a glimpse of Diana Prince and General Darnell and believes them to be Pocahontas and John Smith. After a brief fight with Wonder Woman, Syonide makes his way to an abandoned house in the woods and retrieves a costume with war paint and feathers. This coincidentally turned out to be the haunted house where Etta Candy planned a costume party for that evening. Syonide knocked out Wonder Woman and proceeded to take other party attendees hostage. He stoked the furnace and intended for a broken gas line to blow up his captives. Wonder Woman awoke and began saving party goers while Steve Trevor arrives and defeats Syonide.

=== Second version ===
The second Syonide is an unnamed man who worked as a mercenary for various criminal organizations like the 100. Tobias Whale of the 100's Metropolis branch hired him to dispose of Black Lightning. In one of his attacks on Black Lightning, Syonide also abducts Peter Gambi so that he and Black Lightning can be executed. When Syonide rigs the gun to kill himself, it also hits Gambi, who sacrifices himself to protect Black Lightning.

=== Third version ===
The third Syonide is an unnamed female assassin who wields an electrical whip. She was hired by Tobias Whale to kidnap Valerie Harper and her parents and bring them to an abandoned warehouse. Tobias revealed to Valerie that Syonide killed her in Markovia. When the Outsiders attacked, Syonide attacked Valerie as her parents are killed trying to fight her.

In "Infinite Crisis", Syonide appears as a member of Alexander Luthor Jr.'s Secret Society of Super Villains.

=== Fourth version ===
The fourth Syonide is a member of Lady Eve's incarnation of Strike Force Kobra and had a relationship with Fauna Faust. During Strike Force Kobra's fight with the Outsiders, Syonide is killed by Eradicator.

=== Syonide in other media ===
- An unidentified version of Syonide appears in Black Lightning, portrayed by Charlbi Dean. This version was an abused and malnourished orphan until she was found and recruited by Tobias Whale at the age of eight. Over the years, he trained her in assassination techniques and put her through a procedure wherein she received sub-dermal carbon fiber armor beneath her skin. Throughout the series, she serves as Whale's henchwoman, hitwoman, and mob enforcer. In the second season, Syonide is killed in battle against Kara Fowdy.
- Syonide appears as a character summon in Scribblenauts Unmasked: A DC Comics Adventure.
