= Dark Nemesis =

DC Comics supervillain team

Publication information
- Publisher: DC Comics
- First appearance: Teen Titans (vol. 2) #7 (April 1997)
- Created by: Dan Jurgens

In-story information
- Member(s): Axis; Blizard; Carom; Scorcher; Vault

Dark Nemesis is a supervillain team appearing in American comic books published by DC Comics.

== Publication history ==
Dark Nemesis first appeared in Teen Titans (vol. 2) #7 and was created by Dan Jurgens.

== Fictional team biography ==
Dark Nemesis is a high-powered group who will work for anyone that will pay them. They first come in conflict with the Teen Titans when they are contracted by the Veil to test the Titans' abilities. After the battle, only Scorcher evades capture.

Scorcher later orchestrates a prison break. During the breakout, Risk detects a psychic connection with Scorcher and learns that she is part H'San Natall. Scorcher is abandoned by her teammates and saves the lives of Atom and Risk.

The members of Dark Nemesis later betray and kill Scorcher and frame Risk for her murder. However, the Titans find evidence to prove Risk's innocence.

A mysterious boss later hires the Dark Nemesis to acquire a diet substance named Apex. The group recruits a new Scorcher as the replacement for the former Scorcher that they killed. Before they can acquire the files on Apex, they are thwarted by the Titans.

In Infinite Crisis, Vault and Blizard appear as members of Alexander Luthor Jr.'s Secret Society of Super Villains.

== Membership ==
- Axis - The blue-skinned leader of Dark Nemesis. She is a ruthless and cunning warrior who can detect weaknesses and compromises her opponents' ability to fight.
- Blizard - An armored reptilian man who possesses cold-based powers.
- Carom - A purple-skinned speedster who can ricochet at high speeds.
- Scorcher - A H'San Natall/human hybrid who possesses heat-based powers.
- Scorcher - The original Scorcher's successor.
- Vault - Axis's lover. He can create individual prisons that negate superpowers.
