= Isaiah Crockett =

- Isaiah as Slager/Joto

Publication information
- Publisher: DC Comics
- First appearance: Teen Titans (vol. 2) #1 (October 1996)
- Created by: Dan Jurgens

In-story information
- Alter ego: Isaiah Crockett
- Species: Human/H'San Natall hybrid
- Team affiliations: Teen Titans
- Notable aliases: Slager, Joto, Hot Spot
- Abilities: Flight; Heat generation; Burning aura

Isaiah Crockett (currently known as Hot Spot, formerly Joto, and originally named Slager) is a character appearing in media published by DC Comics. The character is a superhero and a member of the Teen Titans. Along with fellow Titans members Argent, Risk, and Prysm, Crockett is a hybrid of the alien species H'San Natall, giving him the ability to generate heat. In later appearances, Crockett's abilities evolved, allowing him to create fire.

== Publication history ==
Isaiah Crockett first appeared in Teen Titans (vol. 2) #1, and was created by Dan Jurgens. The character was originally known as Slager and later as Joto, the Swahili word for heat. When Isaiah was adapted for the animated series Teen Titans (2003), the producers learned that Joto was also a derogatory Spanish term for homosexuals and renamed him Hot Spot to avoid controversy. This change carried over to the comics, with Isaiah first appearing as Hot Spot in the 2006 series 52.

== Fictional character biography ==
Isaiah Crockett is one of several human-H'San Natall hybrids who were created as sleeper agents for the H'San Natall. On his first day attending Ivy University, Isaiah is abducted by the H'San Natall alongside Toni Monetti and Cody Driscoll, with all three learning of their nature as hybrids. The three, alongside Prysm, form a new version of the Teen Titans. Isaiah is initially known as Slager, but takes the codename Joto at his father's suggestion.

During a battle with Haze, Joto is badly burned and transfers his life force into Prysm before dying. The H'San Natall repair Joto's body, leaving him a mindless killing machine. When Prysm comes close to Joto, his essence returns to his body. Together, the Titans and Superman talk the H'San Natall out of further aggression.

During the one-year gap depicted in 52, Isaiah briefly joins the newest incarnation of the Teen Titans as Hot Spot. Shortly before the events of Final Crisis, Hot Spot is considered for the Titans membership drive, but is passed over in favor of Static, Aquagirl, and Kid Eternity.

During the Heroes in Crisis storyline, Hot Spot is among the heroes killed in an energy blast at the Sanctuary therapy center. In The Flash, it is revealed that the hero Gold Beetle replaced all of the dead heroes with clones from the 31st century and that they are all alive.

== Powers and abilities ==
Hot Spot was originally able to increase the temperature of any object he touched, and he could sense heat via infrared vision. As Joto, he used a wrist-mounted cannon, with which he could fire heated projectiles. During One Year Later, Hot Spot gained the ability to fly and generate fire using his temperature abilities.

== In other media ==
- Isaiah Crockett appears in Teen Titans, voiced initially by Khary Payton and subsequently by Bumper Robinson. This version is an honorary member of the Teen Titans.
- Isaiah Crockett / Hot Spot makes a cameo appearance in the Teen Titans Go! (2013) episode "Freak Show" via archival footage from the Teen Titans episode "Winner Take All".
- Isaiah Crockett / Hot Spot appears in Teen Titans (2005), voiced again by Bumper Robinson.
- Isaiah Crockett / Hot Spot appears as a character summon in Scribblenauts Unmasked: A DC Comics Adventure.
- Isaiah Crockett / Hot Spot appears in Teen Titans Go! (2004).
