= Flash in film =

List of appearances of the DC Comics character in films

The fictional character Flash, a superhero appearing in comic books published by DC Comics, has appeared in multiple films since his creation. Unlike fellow superheroes such as Superman and Batman, multiple characters have assumed the mantle of the Flash. These include Jay Garrick, Barry Allen, his nephew Wally West, and grandson Bart Allen.

A film focusing on the Flash was originally considered by Warner Bros. in the late 1980s. Development on the film started in late 2004 with the hiring of David S. Goyer as writer / director; the film was to focus on Wally West.

== Proposed The Flash film ==
=== David S. Goyer ===
Warner Bros. hired comic book writer Jeph Loeb to write a screenplay in the late-1980s, but the outing never materialized. Development for a film adaptation was revived in late 2004 after the studio was impressed with David S. Goyer's script for Batman Begins (2005), and he was offered the choice of a Flash or Green Lantern film adaptation. In December that same year, it was announced that Goyer would be writing, producing and directing The Flash. According to Goyer, the film would have focused on Wally West, and he approached his Blade: Trinity co-star Ryan Reynolds for the role. Goyer's script, which he tonally compared to Sam Raimi's work on the first two movies of the Spider-Man trilogy, was influenced by seminal comic book runs by Mike Baron, Mark Waid, and Geoff Johns. By February 3, 2007, however, Goyer dropped out of the project, citing creative differences with the studio.

=== Shawn Levy, David Dobkin ===
Shortly after Goyer dropped out of the project, Shawn Levy was hired to direct on February 5, 2007. Levy intended for the film to be lighter in tone than Batman Begins and Superman Returns (2006). Additionally, he was to oversee the writing of a new draft, which was believed to use elements of Goyer's script. By October 2007, Levy departed from The Flash, due to his commitment to Night at the Museum: Battle of the Smithsonian (2009), and was replaced by David Dobkin; in November, Warner Bros. hired Craig Wright to script The Flash.

While Dobkin initially stated that the film would still focus on Wally West, and would act as a spin-off to the then-upcoming Justice League film, it was later stated that the two films would have no connection. The Dark Knight (2008) producer Charles Roven revealed in January 2008 that, despite having both a writer and director, the project would be delayed due to the 2007–08 Writers Guild of America strike, which lasted from November 5, 2007, to February 12, 2008.

Warner Bros. brought Batman producer Charles Roven aboard, with comic book writer Geoff Johns serving as a consult and co-writer. Johns created a new film treatment. Dan Mazeau was the screenwriter.

=== Greg Berlanti ===
In late February 2010, it was reported that the leading contender to helm The Flash was Greg Berlanti (who subsequently went on to introduce The Flash TV show). Warner Bros. Chairman and CEO Barry Meyer said they are getting close to giving the go-ahead for a film. On June 9, 2010, Green Lantern writers Berlanti, Michael Green and Marc Guggenheim were hired to pen a treatment of the film." The Flash script would be based on the recent run by DC's chief creative officer Geoff Johns. Mazeau told Blastr.com that the studio are still actively developing the big screen take on the DC Comics' character and that the project is not dead yet.

== Proposed Justice League film ==
=== Justice League: Mortal ===
The same month Goyer revealed he was off The Flash, Warner Bros. hired husband and wife screenwriting duo Michelle and Kieran Mulroney to script a Justice League film featuring Barry Allen, Justice League attached George Miller as director. He cast Adam Brody as Barry Allen. Filming was nearly set to begin for Justice League, but Brody's contract lapsed when the Australian Film Commission denied Warner Bros. a 45 percent tax credit.

== DC Extended Universe (2016–2023) ==
=== Batman v Superman: Dawn of Justice (2016) ===
The Flash's first appearance in the DCEU happened in Batman v Superman: Dawn of Justice where the character made two small appearances, played by Ezra Miller. He first appears in a nightmare sequence showing up in the Batcave, wearing a futuristic armor version of his classic costume, in order to warn Bruce Wayne of an upcoming threat. Although the scene is left for interpretation, with Flash stating that Lois Lane is the key and that Bruce was right about "him" mixed in with a frustrated realization that he is "too soon," it indicates a possible post-apocalyptic future which the character is trying to prevent. He is later seen again, this time in the "real world" and in the present day when Wonder Woman is going through the recorded footage of several metahuman sightings. He appears in a liquor store's security camera footage, wearing his normal civilian clothes, stopping a burglar.

=== Suicide Squad (2016) ===
Miller reprised their role in Suicide Squad, in a flashback where he is shown easily apprehending George "Digger" Harkness / Captain Boomerang.

=== Justice League (2017, 2021) ===
Miller reprises their role in the theatrical and director's cut of Justice League.

=== The Flash (2023) ===
On July 20, 2013, The Hollywood Reporter reported that the film was rumored to be released in 2016 but it was not announced.

In October 2014, Warner Bros. announced The Flash would be released in 2018 as the sixth installment of the DC Extended Universe. Ezra Miller was cast to play the title role of Barry Allen. A story treatment for the film was written by Phil Lord and Chris Miller. The studio was courting the duo to also direct, but they declined due to their busy schedule. The studio instead signed Seth Grahame-Smith to write and direct. In April 2016, he dropped out due to creative differences. The studio retained his script. Greg Berlanti, who co-created The CW's television series of the same name, was previously said to be writer and director.

In June 2016, it was revealed that Rick Famuyiwa would be taking the helm as a director for The Flash. Famuyiwa posted a photo on his Instagram page that he did research on the character.

On 25 July 2016, Kiersey Clemons was announced as being cast in the role of Iris West. In August 2016, Ray Fisher was announced to reprise his role as Victor Stone / Cyborg. However director Famuyiwa denied Cyborg's involvement in the film. Filming was scheduled to start in January 2017 in London, England. On September 9, 2016, Variety reported that Billy Crudup was in talks for the role of Henry Allen.

On October 31, 2016, The Hollywood Reporter reported that Famuyiwa had left the film over creative differences.

On January 25, 2017, Variety reported that Joby Harold would rewrite the script for the film. On April 27, 2017, Screen Junkies reported that Robert Zemeckis was in talks to direct the film. In May, the studio had Robert Zemeckis, Matthew Vaughn, and Sam Raimi on a shortlist of possible directors for the film. Later that month, Raimi and Marc Webb had dropped out from the running. In June 2017, The Wrap reported that Lord and Miller were in talks to direct the film again.

In September 2017, Deadline reported that Gal Gadot would reprise her role as Diana Prince / Wonder Woman. However, this was later stated to not be the case.

In February 2018, it was announced that filmmaking duo John Francis Daley and Jonathan Goldstein, had signed on to direct the film. By July 2019, Daley and Goldstein had left the project; Andy Muschietti and Christina Hodson entered negotiations to direct and write a new draft of the script, respectively. Barbara Muschietti and Michael Disco additionally joined the project as producers. Filming was expected to begin on August 31, 2021, at Warner Bros. Studios, Leavesden. In January 2020, Muschietti stated that elements of the Flashpoint storyline will be incorporated into the film. In June 2020, it was reported that Michael Keaton was in early talks to reprise his role as Bruce Wayne / Batman for the film, a role which he previously played in Tim Burton's Batman (1989) and Batman Returns (1992). In August 2020, it was confirmed that Keaton had signed onto the film and that Ben Affleck would also be reprising his role as Batman from the DC Extended Universe. Fisher was also included as a significant role in the film at this point, but was written out of the script in January 2021 following his accusations of abuse at DC Films. In February 2021 it was announced that Sasha Calle would portray Supergirl. In March 2021, Kiersey Clemons had officially signed onto to return as Iris West. Later that month, Maribel Verdú had been cast to portray Nora Allen, Barry's mother. Billy Crudup was initially set to return as Henry Allen, but left due to scheduling conflicts. The role is now recast with Ron Livingston portraying Henry. In December 2021, Michael Shannon and Antje Traue were revealed to be reprising their roles from Man of Steel as General Zod and Faora respectively. In April 2022, the final writing credits were revealed: Hodson received screenplay credit; Daley, Goldstein, and Harold received screen story credit; and off-screen credit for additional writing material went to Rebecca Drysdale, Famuyiwa, Grahame-Smith, Johns, Lord, Christopher Miller, Ezra Miller, Morrison, and Adam Sztykiel. The Flash was released on June 16, 2023.

== Animated films ==
=== Standalone films ===
==== Justice League: The New Frontier ====
Barry Allen appears in Justice League: The New Frontier, voiced by Neil Patrick Harris. Jay Garrick and Wally West also make brief appearances during the opening and closing credits of the film.

==== Justice League: Crisis on Two Earths ====
Wally West/The Flash appears in the direct-to-video movie Justice League: Crisis on Two Earths voiced by Josh Keaton as a main character. In the film, Flash and the rest of the Justice League assists an alternate Lex Luthor battle the Crime Syndicate of America and restore order to the alternate world. Flash eventually battles his double, Johnny Quick in the final epic battle that is League centered. The true final battle is between Batman and Owlman on Earth Prime.

==== DC Super Friends ====
The Flash/Barry Allen appears in the direct-to-video DC Super Friends: The Joker's Playhouse (2010) voiced by Eric Bauza.

==== Justice League: Doom ====
The Flash appears in the animated film Justice League: Doom, voiced by Michael Rosenbaum who previously voiced Wally West in the DC animated universe. In this film, Flash's identity is clearly stated as Barry Allen as a Central City detective addresses Allen by name while he's working a crime scene as a CSI. He also has his trademark Flash ring and is more serious than previous animated incarnations of Flash. In the film, Mirror Master is the villain chosen by Vandal Savage to fight Flash. Mirror Master does so by tricking Flash into sticking his hand in a "hostage box" to save an old woman -only the woman is a hologram- and Flash ends up with a speed sensitive bomb on his wrist. Batman eventually has him vibrate through an iceberg to save him, and he goes on with the rest of the JLA to fight the Legion of Doom.

==== Lego Batman: The Movie - DC Super Heroes Unite ====
Barry Allen appears in the animated film Lego Batman: The Movie - DC Super Heroes Unite, an adaptation of the video game of the same name, with Charlie Schlatter reprising his role.

==== JLA Adventures: Trapped in Time ====
An ambiguous version of The Flash appears in the 2014 direct-to-dvd animated film, JLA Adventures: Trapped in Time with voice actor Jason Spisak voicing the character. His visual in the film is clearly based on Barry Allen.

==== Teen Titans Go! To the Movies ====
The Flash appears in Teen Titans Go! To the Movies, voiced by Wil Wheaton. He is one of the heroes depicted as starring in a movie, which leads to him falling under Deathstroke's control as a part of his plan to take over the world. He is ultimately freed by the Teen Titans.

==== DC Super Heroes vs. Eagle Talon ====
Barry Allen appears in DC Super Heroes vs. Eagle Talon, voiced by Daisuke Namikawa.

=== DC Animated Movie Universe (2013–2020) ===
==== Justice League: The Flashpoint Paradox ====
Barry Allen appears as the main protagonist in Justice League: The Flashpoint Paradox, with Justin Chambers voicing the character. Barry is interrupted while visiting his mother's grave on her birthday and leaves as the Flash to battle the Top, Mirror Master, Heat Wave, Captain Cold, and Captain Boomerang at the Flash Museum. Professor Zoom later reveals this to have been a trap for the Flash. He intends to kill Flash along with thousands of others, and link Flash's name to the destruction. The Justice League shows up and defuses all the bombs that Zoom set and all the villains are arrested. Shaken by what transpired, and full of thoughts about his dead mother, Flash parts from his Justice League colleagues and chooses to be alone. The next day, Flash wakes up in a universe where history has happened differently. Here, he has none of his powers, his mother is alive, Iris is married to someone else, and a feud between Aquaman and Wonder Woman has triggered an all-out global war. Flash blames Professor Zoom for messing with the timeline. He enlists the help of Batman (Thomas Wayne, Bruce's father) to regain his speed. He does so by recreating the accident that gave him his powers. The first attempt fails, leaving Barry with third degree burns. The second attempt, however, is successful, with him fully regaining his speed. Barry then gathers up a band of heroes including Cyborg (a government agent), and the Shazam Kids (all of whom become one Captain Thunder when they all say the wizard Shazam's name together) to stop the war and restore the timeline. However, during a fight with Professor Zoom, Flash discovers that Zoom did not do anything, and that it was he who altered time by going back and saving his mother. After Batman kills Zoom, Flash travels back and prevents himself from saving his mother, but once again fractures time, creating another alternate timeline which differs in subtler ways from the original. Barry is also in a better place with his mother's death, and is reunited with Iris. He also gives Batman (Bruce Wayne) a letter that Thomas asked him to deliver to his son.

==== Justice League: War ====
Barry Allen appears in the animated film Justice League: War, voiced by Christopher Gorham.

==== Justice League: Throne of Atlantis ====
Barry Allen appears in the animated film Justice League: Throne of Atlantis, with Christopher Gorham reprising his role.

==== Justice League vs. Teen Titans ====
Barry Allen appears in the animated film Justice League vs. Teen Titans, with Christopher Gorham reprising the role. He is possessed by Trigon along with the rest of the League but is eventually saved when Superman breaks his leg.

==== Justice League Dark ====
Barry Allen appears via a non-speaking cameo in Justice League Dark.

==== Teen Titans: The Judas Contract ====
Wally West as Kid Flash appears in a flashback in Teen Titans: The Judas Contract, voiced by Jason Spisak.

==== The Death of Superman ====
Barry Allen appears in the animated film The Death of Superman, with Christopher Gorham reprising his role.

==== Reign of the Supermen ====
Barry Allen appears in the animated film Reign of the Supermen, with Christopher Gorham reprising his role.

==== Justice League Dark: Apokolips War ====
Barry Allen appears in the animated film Justice League Dark: Apokolips War, with Christopher Gorham reprising his role.

=== Tomorrowverse (2020–2024) ===
==== Justice Society: World War II ====
Barry Allen appears as the main protagonist in the animated film Justice Society: World War II, voiced by Matt Bomer.

=== The Lego Movie (2014–present) ===
==== The Lego Movie (2014) ====
The Flash makes a non-speaking cameo appearance in The Lego Movie.

==== The Lego Batman Movie (2017) ====
Barry Allen appears in The Lego Batman Movie, voiced by Adam DeVine.

=== Lego DC Comics Super Heroes (2014–present) ===
==== Lego DC Comics: Batman: Be-Leaguered ====
Barry Allen appears in Lego DC Comics: Batman Be-Leaguered, voiced by James Arnold Taylor.

==== Lego DC Comics Super Heroes: Justice League vs. Bizarro League ====
Barry Allen appears in Lego DC Comics Super Heroes: Justice League vs. Bizarro League, with James Arnold Taylor reprising the role.

==== Lego DC Comics Super Heroes: Justice League: Attack of the Legion of Doom ====
Barry Allen appears in Lego DC Comics Super Heroes: Justice League: Attack of the Legion of Doom, with James Arnold Taylor reprising the role.

==== Lego DC Comics Super Heroes: Justice League: Cosmic Clash ====
Barry Allen appears in Lego DC Comics Super Heroes: Justice League: Cosmic Clash, with James Arnold Taylor reprising the role.

==== Lego DC Comics Super Heroes: The Flash ====
Barry Allen appears as the main protagonist in the film Lego DC Comics Super Heroes: The Flash, with James Arnold Taylor reprising the role.

=== Batman Unlimited ===
Barry Allen appears in Batman Unlimited: Animal Instincts, voiced by Charlie Schlatter.
