= Argent (character) =

- Argent as depicted in Robin & Argent: Double Shot (February 1998). Art by Greg Land.

Publication information
- Publisher: DC Comics
- First appearance: Teen Titans (vol. 2) #1 (October 1996)
- Created by: Dan Jurgens

In-story information
- Alter ego: Antonia Louise "Toni" Monetti
- Species: Human/H'San Natall hybrid
- Team affiliations: Teen Titans; Justice League
- Abilities: Plasma energy manipulation; Plasma energy generation; Plasma energy constructs; Flight

Argent (Toni Monetti) is a superheroine appearing in American comic books published by DC Comics. She first appears in issue #1 of the second series of the Teen Titans comics and remains a regular member of the team until the events of Graduation Day, when Nightwing disbands the group. Along with fellow Titans members Risk, Joto, and Prysm, Risk is a hybrid of the alien species H'San Natall, which gives her pale skin and the ability to create silver energy constructs.

Argent was adapted to television in the animated series Teen Titans, where she was voiced by Hynden Walch. This version of the character is part of the Teen Titans' expanded roster. Argent also appears in the series' spin-off comic Teen Titans Go!.

== Fictional character biography ==
Toni Monetti is the daughter of a former U.S. Senator from New Jersey. Around the time she turns sixteen, Toni's skin turns silver and she is abducted by the H'San Natall. She and three other teenagers - Isaiah Crockett, Cody Driscoll, and Audrey Spears - learn that they are part H'San Natall and were intended as part of a sleeper agent program to help the species take over Earth. With the funding of Loren Jupiter, the teens found a new incarnation of the Teen Titans.

During a battle with Loren Jupiter's son Jarrod, the supervillain known as Haze, Isaiah Crockett is badly burnt and apparently killed. Shortly afterward, Loren disbands the Teen Titans. While operating as an independent hero, Argent helps Robin deal with a group of drug dealers affiliated with her father. Argent and the Titans later learn that Isaiah survived and was healed by the H'San Natall.

=== The Titans ===
When Nightwing, Troia, Flash, Tempest, and Arsenal, the founding members of the Teen Titans, reform the group in the wake of the Technis Imperative conflict, Argent is invited to join. In One Year Later, Argent dates and later breaks up with teammate Molecule.

=== Final Crisis and later appearances ===
At some point, Argent falls victim to the Dark Side Club and is forced to fight other captive metahumans at the behest of the New Gods. Argent is rescued by Miss Martian, who takes her and the other prisoners to Titans Tower. Argent is offered a spot on the Teen Titans by Wonder Girl, but declines.

== Powers and abilities ==
Argent can generate solid energy constructs out of silver plasma, such as protective shields, daggers, and battering rams. While she initially could not fly, she can create slides and flying platforms to carry herself and others through the air.

== In other media ==
- Argent appears in Teen Titans, voiced by Hynden Walch. This version is from New Zealand and is an honorary member of the titular team who possesses red energy constructs.
- Argent appears in Teen Titans Go!.
- Argent appears as a character summon in Scribblenauts Unmasked: A DC Comics Adventure.
