= H'San Natall =

Alien species in DC Comics

Publication information
- Publisher: DC Comics
- First appearance: Teen Titans (vol. 2) #1 (October 1996)
- Created by: Dan Jurgens; George Pérez

Characteristics
- Notable members: King Ch'Ah; Queen Miraset

The H'San Natall are a fictional alien race appearing in American comic books published by DC Comics. They were introduced in the second volume of Teen Titans in 1996 as a race of conquerors who intended to invade Earth. Teen Titans members Risk, Argent, and Hot Spot (originally known as Joto) are H'San Natall hybrids who were intended to act as sleeper agents for the species, but rebelled after learning of their heritage.

== Publication history ==
The H'San Natall first appeared in Teen Titans (vol. 2) #1, and were created by Dan Jurgens and George Pérez.

== Fictional species biography ==
The H'San Natall are a dangerous and dominating alien species who have conquered several thousand planets. The H'San Natall also employ bio-genetic tactics in their invasion plans, abducting and impregnating nine human females to further their plans. All but one female (who later became Queen) were released with the memories of their experiments wiped from their memories. Nine months later, on June 21, the human/H'San Natall hybrids were born, intended to serve as sleeper agents for the H'San Natall. The H'San Natall plan to abduct the children on their 16th birthdays and brainwash them to assist in conquering Earth, but only succeed in capturing three of them: Isaiah Crockett, Toni Monetti, and Cody Driscoll. Just before Isaiah is abducted, Atom is caught in the energy stream and transported as well. Once on the alien ship, the children meet and rescue another human/H'San Natall hybrid named Prysm before escaping. Each of the teenagers develop superpowers and work with the Atom to form a new incarnation of the Teen Titans.

The H'San Natall use an anti-alien group known as the Veil as a front to discredit the Titans. One of their goals is to kill Scorcher and frame Risk. However, the Teen Titans are able to find evidence that cleared Risk of the murder charges. The Teen Titans are hunted by Deathstroke, who captures them and brings them to the H'San Natall. Once there, Prysm meets her parents, Queen Miraset and King Ch'ah. Before the H'San Natall can reprogram the human/H'San Natall hybrids to begin their invasion of Earth, the Teen Titans are saved by Captain Marvel Jr., Changeling, and Superman. Although Ch'Ah wants to bring their children back to their homeworld, Superman threatens to bring the mothership down if they continue any further acts of aggression. Ch'Ah agrees to stand down. While the Teen Titans return to Earth, Prysm decides to stay with the H'San Natall.
