= Risk (character) =

- Risk as depicted in Teen Titans (vol. 2) #23 (August 1998). Art by Dan Jurgens (penciler) and Norm Rapmund (inker).

Publication information
- Publisher: DC Comics
- First appearance: Teen Titans (vol. 2) #1 (October 1996)
- Created by: Dan Jurgens

In-story information
- Alter ego: Cody Driscoll
- Team affiliations: Teen Titans; Young Justice; Titans East
- Abilities: Superhuman strength, durability, and agility

Risk (Cody Driscoll) is a comic book character appearing in American comic books published by DC Comics. He first appeared in Teen Titans (vol. 2) #1 (October 1996), and was created by Dan Jurgens. Along with fellow Titans members Argent, Joto, and Prysm, Risk is a hybrid of the alien species H'San Natall, which gives him superhuman strength, durability, and speed coupled with increased adrenaline. Risk had his right arm ripped off by Superboy-Prime during the Infinite Crisis storyline, leading to him joining Deathstroke's Titans East in his pursuit of revenge.

== Fictional character biography ==
Raised in the Colorado community of Cosmos, Cody Driscoll lived alone with his mother in a trailer park. His father died when he was six months old, with his mother having remarried twice.

Cody, although an above-average student, becomes an adrenaline seeker and troublemaker, rebelling against authority. While sneaking into a NORAD facility, Cody is abducted by the H'San Natall alongside Isaiah Crockett and Toni Monetti. The three discover that they are part H'San Natall and were intended to act as sleeper agents for the species. The children decide to form a new incarnation of the Teen Titans. After team members Prysm and Fringe elect to remain in space, the Titans disband, with Risk returning to Colorado.

In Infinite Crisis, Superboy calls in all the reserve Titans to help him battle Superboy-Prime. When the Titans attack him, Superboy-Prime lashes back, ripping off Risk's right arm. Argent uses her plasma energy to cauterize Risk's wound, saving his life.

In "One Year Later", Risk becomes a petty criminal and is recruited into Deathstroke's version of Titans East. In an interview, writer Geoff Johns stated that "you're going to meet him in the next issue and see where he is in his life. He's still missing an arm. And his attitude is like, at one point someone's going to say, 'Why don't you get a cybernetic arm?' And he says, 'I only need one arm'. That's his attitude. He's just kind of gruff and at the end of his rope".

In the Sinestro Corps War event, Risk returns seeking revenge against Superboy-Prime, who tears off his other arm. Following The New 52 and DC Rebirth relaunches, Risk is reintroduced in Nightwing (2022), where he is killed by a member of the Rising.

== Powers and abilities ==
Due to being a H'San Natall hybrid, Risk possesses superhuman strength, durability, agility, and senses. However, his powers give him enhanced levels of adrenaline that drive him to take greater risks.

== In other media ==
Risk appears as a character summon in Scribblenauts Unmasked: A DC Comics Adventure.
