= List of Outsiders members =

The Outsiders is a team of superheroes that appear in comic books published by DC Comics.

The roster of the team has changed a great deal over the years. These roster lists are of the members during the Outsiders' various incarnations by team iteration. The codenames listed under Character are those used when that character was a member of the team. Bolded names indicate current team members.

Joined in refers to the issue where the character first appeared as a member of the team. It is not necessarily the first appearance of the character in print, nor the story depicting how the character joined the team.

== Pre-Rebirth ==
Character	Real name	Joined in	Notes
**Original team: Batman and the Outsiders** This roster covers the iteration of the team that was featured in Batman and the Outsiders, Adventures of the Outsiders, and The Outsiders.
**Batman**	Bruce Wayne	The Brave and the Bold #200 (July 1983)	Founding member and leader. Active. (November 2010)
**Black Lightning**	Jefferson Pierce	The Brave and the Bold #200 (July 1983)	Founding member. Active.
**Geo-Force**	Brion Markov	The Brave and the Bold #200 (July 1983)	Founding member Older brother of Terra. Inactive
**Halo**	Gabrielle Doe	The Brave and the Bold #200 (July 1983)	Founding member. Active in the Outsiders.
**Katana**	Tatsu Yamashiro	The Brave and the Bold #200 (July 1983)	Founding member. Active in the Outsiders.
**Metamorpho**	Rex Mason	The Brave and the Bold #200 (July 1983)	Founding member. Active in the Outsiders.
**Looker**	Emily Briggs	The Adventures of the Outsiders #34 (June 1986)	Active in the Outsiders
**Windfall**	Clone of Wendy Jones	The Outsiders #19 (May 1987)	Deceased as of The Outsiders #20 (June 1987).
**Windfall**	Wendy Jones	The Outsiders #20 (June 1987)	Deceased as of Suicide Squad: Raise the Flag #7 (May 2008).
Atomic Knight	Gardner Grayle	The Outsiders #28 (February 1988)	Active.
**Outsiders Vol. 2** This roster covers members inducted into the team in Outsiders Vol. 2.
Sebastian Faust		Outsiders (vol. 2) #1 Alpha (November 1993)	Active in Checkmate.
Technocrat	Geoffrey Barron	Outsiders (vol. 2) #1 Alpha (November 1993)	Deceased as of Infinite Crisis #7 (June 2006).
Wylde	Charlie Wylde	Outsiders (vol. 2) #1 Alpha (November 1993)	Left the team after being transformed into a normal bear.
Eradicator	David Connor	Outsiders (vol. 2) #3 (January 1994)	Apparently deceased.
Dervish	Nema	Outsiders (vol. 2) #9 (July 1994)	Active.
Terra	Tara Markov (doppelgänger)	Day of Judgment #4 (November 1999)	Deceased in World War III #3 (June 2007); Sister of Geo-Force
Doctor Light	Kimiyo Hoshi	JLA: Our Worlds at War #1 (September 2001)	Active.
**Outsiders Vol. 3** This roster covers members inducted into the team in Outsiders Vol. 3.
Arsenal	Roy Harper	Outsiders (vol. 3) #1 (August 2003)	Active in the Titans.
**Grace**	Grace Choi	Outsiders (vol. 3) #1 (August 2003)	Active in the Outsiders
Indigo	Brainiac 8	Outsiders (vol. 3) #1 (August 2003)	Deceased as of Outsiders (vol. 3) #25 (August 2005).
Shift	"Clone" of Metamorpho	Outsiders (vol. 3) #1 (August 2003)	Fully regrown fragment of Metamorpho. Reassimilated into Metamorpho in Outsiders Annual (vol. 3) #1 (June 2007).
**Thunder**	Anissa Pierce	Outsiders (vol. 3) #1 (August 2003)	Active in the Outsiders
Nightwing	Dick Grayson	Outsiders (vol. 3) #1 (August 2003)	Active as Batman.
Jade	Jennifer-Lynn Hayden	Outsiders (vol. 3) #1 (August 2003)	Died in Rann–Thanagar War: Infinite Crisis Special #1 (April 2006). Resurrected in Blackest Night #8 (May 2010). Active in the Justice League.
Huntress	Helena Bertinelli	Outsiders (vol. 3) #8 (March 2004)	Active.
**Starfire**	Koriand'r	Outsiders (vol. 3) #16 (November 2004)	Active in the R.E.B.E.L.S.
Captain Marvel Jr.	Freddy Freeman	Outsiders (vol. 3) #28 (November 2005)	Active as Shazam.
Captain Boomerang	Owen Mercer	Outsiders (vol. 3) #34 (May 2006)	Deceased in Blackest Night: The Flash #3 (April 2010).
**Outsiders: Five of a Kind / Batman and the Outsiders Vol. 2 / Outsiders Vol. 4** This roster covers members inducted into the team in Outsiders: Five of a Kind, Batman and the Outsiders Vol. 2, and Outsiders (vol. 4).
Martian Manhunter	J'onn J'onzz	Outsiders: Five of a Kind #3 (August 2007)	Deceased as of Final Crisis #1. Resurrected in Blackest Night #8 (May 2010).
Catwoman	Selina Kyle	Outsiders (vol. 3) #50 (September 2007)	Active.
Batgirl	Cassandra Cain	Batman and the Outsiders (vol. 2) #2 (November 2008)	Active in Batman Inc. as Blackbat.
Francine Langstrom		Batman and the Outsiders (vol. 2) #3 (December 2007)	Active.
Green Arrow	Oliver Queen	Batman and the Outsiders (vol. 2) #4 (February 2008)	Active.
ReMAC	Salah Miandad	Batman and the Outsiders (vol. 2) #5 (March 2008)	Deceased in Batman and the Outsiders (vol. 2) #11 (November 2008).
Creeper	Jack Ryder	Outsiders (vol. 4) #15 (February 2009)	Active in adventuring.
**Owlman**	Roy Raymond Jr.	Outsiders (vol. 4) #15 (February 2009)	Active.
**Freight Train**	Cecil	Outsiders (vol. 4) #31 (August 2010)	Active in the Outsiders.
**Olympian**	Achilles the Warkiller	Outsiders (vol. 4) #37 (April 2011)	Active.
**Batman Inc.** This roster covers members inducted into the team in the Batman Inc. series.
**Red Robin**	Tim Drake	Batman Inc. #6 (May 2011)	Active in the Teen Titans.
**Metamorpho**	Rex Mason	Batman Inc. #6 (May 2011)	Active
**Katana**	Tatsu Yamashiro	Batman Inc. #6 (May 2011)	Active in Justice League of America
**Halo**	Gabrielle Doe	Batman Inc. #6 (May 2011)	Active in the Dead Heroes Club
**Looker**	Emily Briggs	Batman Inc. #6 (May 2011)	Active
**Freight Train**	Cecil	Batman Inc. #6 (May 2011)	Active

== DC Rebirth ==
Character	Real name	Joined in	Notes
**DC Rebirth** This roster covers members inducted into the team during DC Rebirth.
**Black Lightning**	Jefferson Pierce	Detective Comics #983 (June 2018)	Leader of the Outsiders. Active.
**Signal**	Duke Thomas	Detective Comics #983 (June 2018)	Active
Orphan	Cassandra Cain	Detective Comics #983 (June 2018)	Active as Batgirl in the Birds of Prey
**Katana**	Tatsu Yamashiro	Detective Comics #986	Active
Lady Shiva	Sandra Wu-San	Batman and the Outsiders (vol. 3) #11 (May 2020)	Active
Babylon	Sofia Ramos	Batman and the Outsiders (vol. 3) #12 (July 2020)	Active
**Dawn of DC** This roster covers members inducted into the team during Dawn of DC.
**Batwing**	Luke Fox	Outsiders (vol. 5) #1 (September 2023)	Active.
Batwoman	Kate Kane	Outsiders (vol. 5) #1 (September 2023)	Quits in Vol. 5 #11

== In other media ==
Character	Real name	Joined in	Portrayed by	Notes
**Smallville**
Arsenal	Roy Harper	Smallville Season 11: Continuity #4		Active Comics-only
Black Lightning	Jefferson Pierce	Smallville Season 11: Continuity #4		Active Comics-only
Grace Choi		Smallville Season 11: Continuity #4		Active Comics-only
Green Arrow	Oliver Queen	Smallville Season 11: Continuity #4	Justin Hartley	Leader Active
Katana	Tatsu Yamashiro	Smallville Season 11: Continuity #4		Active Comics-only
Metamorpho	Rex Mason	Smallville Season 11: Continuity #4		Active Comics-only
**Batman: The Brave and the Bold**
Black Lightning	Jefferson Pierce	S1E6: "Enter the Outsiders!"	Bumper Robinson	Active
Geo-Force	Brion Markov	S2E13: "Requiem for a Scarlet Speedster!"	Hunter Parrish	Active
Halo	Gabrielle Doe	S2E13: "Requiem for a Scarlet Speedster!"	N/A	Active
Katana	Tatsu Yamashiro	S1E6: "Enter the Outsiders!"	Vyvan Pham; Kim Mai Guest	Active
Metamorpho	Rex Mason	S1E6: "Enter the Outsiders!"	Scott Menville	Active
**Young Justice**
**Beast Boy**	Garfield Logan	S3E17: "First Impression"	Logan Grove Greg Cipes	Leader; active
**Blue Beetle**	Jaime Reyes	S3E17: "First Impression"	Eric Lopez	Active
Cyborg	Victor Stone	S3E24: "Into the Breach"	Zeno Robinson	Joined the Justice League prior to "Inhospitable"
**El Dorado**	Eduardo Dorado Jr.	S3E18: "Early Warning"	Freddy Rodriguez	Active
**Forager**	Fred Bugg	S3E26: "Nevermore"	Jason Spisak	Active
Geo-Force	Brion Markov	S3E17: "First Impression"	Troy Baker	Left team in "Nevermore".
**Kid Flash**	Bart Allen	S3E17: "First Impression"	Jason Marsden	Active
**Livewire**	Leslie Willis	Before S4E1: "Inhospitable"	Britt Baron	Active
**Looker**	Lia Briggs	Before S4E1: "Inhospitable"	Grey Griffin	Active
**Robin**	Tim Drake	Before S4E1: "Inhospitable"	Cameron Bowen	Active
**Stargirl**	Courtney Whitmore	Before S4E1: "Inhospitable"	Whitney Moore	Active
**Static**	Virgil Hawkins	S3E17: "First Impression"	Bryton James	Active
**Superboy**	Conner Kent	S3E26: "Nevermore"	Nolan North	Active
**Terra**	Tara Markov	S3E26: "Nevermore"	Tara Strong	Active
**Windfall**	Wendy Jones	S4E1: "Inhospitable"	Zehra Fazal	Active
**Wonder Girl**	Cassie Sandsmark	S3E17: "First Impression"	Mae Whitman	Active
**Beware the Batman**
Alfred Pennyworth		S1E26: "Alone"	JB Blanc	Active
Batman	Bruce Wayne	S1E26: "Alone"	Anthony Ruivivar	Leader Active
Katana	Tatsu Yamashiro	S1E26: "Alone"	Sumalee Montano	Active
Man-Bat	Kirk Langstrom	S1E26: "Alone"	Robin Atkin Downes	Active
Metamorpho	Rex Mason	S1E26: "Alone"	Adam Baldwin	Active
Oracle	Barbara Gordon	S1E26: "Alone"	Tara Strong	Active
**Arrowverse**
Black Canary	Dinah Drake	S6E9: "Irreconcilable Differences"	Juliana Harkavy	Inactive
Mister Terrific	Curtis Holt	S6E9: "Irreconcilable Differences"	Echo Kellum	Inactive
Wild Dog	Rene Ramirez	S6E9: "Irreconcilable Differences"	Rick Gonzalez	Inactive
**DC Legends**
Arsenal	Roy Harper	DC Legends (2016)		Active
Black Lightning	Jefferson Pierce	DC Legends (2016)		Active
Katana	Tatsu Yamashiro	DC Legends (2016)		Inactive
**Black Lightning**
Black Lightning	Jefferson Pierce	S3E13: "The Book of Markovia: Chapter Four: Grab the Strap"	Cress Williams	Active
Erica Moran		S3E13: "The Book of Markovia: Chapter Four: Grab the Strap"	Gabriella Garcia	Active
Gardner Grayle		S3E13: "The Book of Markovia: Chapter Four: Grab the Strap"	Boone Platt	Active
Geo	Brandon Marshall	S3E13: "The Book of Markovia: Chapter Four: Grab the Strap"	Jahking Guillory	Active
Grace Choi	Shay Li Wylde	S3E13: "The Book of Markovia: Chapter Four: Grab the Strap"	Chantal Thuy	Active
Lightning	Jennifer Pierce	S3E13: "The Book of Markovia: Chapter Four: Grab the Strap"	China Anne McClain	Active
Painkiller	Khalil Payne	S3E13: "The Book of Markovia: Chapter Four: Grab the Strap"	Jordan Calloway	Active
Technocrat	Geoffrey Barron	S3E13: "The Book of Markovia: Chapter Four: Grab the Strap"	Christopher A'mmanuel	Active
Thunder	Anissa Pierce	S3E13: "The Book of Markovia: Chapter Four: Grab the Strap"	Nafessa Williams	Active
