= Sapphire Stagg =

Publication information
- Publisher: DC Comics
- First appearance: The Brave and the Bold #57 (January 1965)
- Created by: Bob Haney; Ramona Fradon

In-story information
- Species: Human
- Team affiliations: Stagg Enterprises

Sapphire Stagg is a fictional character appearing in American comic books published by DC Comics. She is the wealthy socialite daughter of industrialist Simon Stagg and is the long-term love interest of the superhero Metamorpho.

Sapphire Stagg made her cinematic debut in the DC Universe film Superman (2025), portrayed by Louisa Krause. Additionally, Danica McKellar and Emmanuelle Chriqui have voiced the character in animation.

== Fictional character biography ==
Sapphire Stagg meets and falls in love with one of Stagg's former employees, Rex Mason, and remains with him when he is transformed into the superhero Metamorpho. Simon Stagg disapproves of Sapphire's devotion to Mason and schemes to break them apart (usually by putting Metamorpho into harm's way). Sapphire and Rex eventually marry and have a son named Joey. Joey inherits the transmutation abilities of his father, but can affect the chemical properties of other objects as well.

For a time, Sapphire believes that Metamorpho has died, and Simon arranges for her to marry his Neanderthal assistant Java. Although she remains loyal to Java, her heart always belongs to Rex. Sapphire later discovers that Metamorpho is alive and working in Paris as a member of Justice League Europe. The two have since reunited.

=== Birds of Prey ===
Java comes upon Black Canary while searching for help for Sapphire. He states Sapphire and Joey, Metamorpho's son, has been caught in a lab explosion and merged into a single energy being who was taking revenge upon Simon Stagg's former colleagues. It is revealed that not only were Sapphire and Joey merged, but so was Simon. It is he who is directing the revenge. Black Canary realizes that Java is actually Metamorpho, somehow affected to believe he is Java. The three are separated once more; Simon claims to have been overcome by the energy itself and unable to control his actions.

=== DC Rebirth ===
In 2016, DC Comics implemented a relaunch called "DC Rebirth", which restored its continuity to a form much as it was prior to The New 52. Sapphire is present when Simon Stagg opens a portal to the Dark Multiverse which The Terrifics travel through and when they return home.

== Other versions ==
Sapphire Stagg appears in the Elseworlds story The Nail.

== In other media ==
=== Television ===
- Sapphire Stagg appears in the Justice League episode "Metamorphosis", voiced by Danica McKellar.
- Sapphire Stagg appears in Beware the Batman, voiced by Emmanuelle Chriqui.

=== Film ===
Sapphire Stagg makes a non-speaking cameo appearance in Superman, portrayed by Louisa Krause. This version is Metamorpho's wife and mother of their son Joey.
