= Simon Stagg =

Fictional character from DC Comics

- Simon Stagg as depicted in Metamorpho: Year One #1 (December 2007). Art by Dan Jurgens (penciler), Jesse Delperdang (inker), Guy Major (colorist), and Rob Leigh (letterer).

Publication information
- Publisher: DC Comics
- First appearance: The Brave and the Bold #57 (January 1965)
- Created by: Bob Haney (writer); Ramona Fradon (artist)

In-story information
- Species: Human
- Team affiliations: Stagg Enterprises
- Abilities: Genius-level intellect; Business management

Simon Stagg is a fictional character appearing in American comic books published by DC Comics, serving primarily as an antagonist to the superhero Metamorpho in most comic book stories and their adaptations. He is responsible for turning Rex Mason into Metamorpho out of spite after catching him in a relationship with his daughter Sapphire Stagg. Given his high status as a supervillain, he has also come into conflict with Batman, the Flash, Green Lantern and other heroes in the DC Universe.

The character has made several appearances in media outside of comics, such as the television series The Flash in which he was portrayed by William Sadler, and the DC Extended Universe film Wonder Woman 1984, in which he was portrayed by Oliver Cotton.

== Publication history ==
Simon Stagg first appeared in The Brave and the Bold #57 and was created by Bob Haney and Ramona Fradon.

Mark Waid, writer of the Metamorpho limited series, commented that "writing Simon Stagg was always a tightrope walk. On the one hand, you don't want him to be so comically evil that he's a cartoon. On the other hand, you have to remember that he's an absolute creep. The key to Stagg is not losing sight of the fact that he does most everything he does for the sake of his daughter, regardless of how insane those actions may look to us".

== Fictional character biography ==
Simon Stagg is the unscrupulous owner and CEO of Stagg Enterprises and the father of Sapphire Stagg. He sent adventurer Rex Mason to Egypt to retrieve a meteor referred as the Orb of Ra, during which he was exposed to its energy and transformed into Metamorpho.

Sometime later, Stagg tricked the Metal Men into attacking the Justice League and had Java detain Rocket Red and Animal Man. It turned out that Rex and Sapphire had an infant son named Joey, who possesses harmful and uncontrollable transmutation abilities. After Joey injures Java, Metamorpho hands him to Stagg, who becomes convinced that Joey will kill him. However, Stagg is unharmed since something in his genetic structure protects him and Sapphire. Stagg's stance softened, and everyone was allowed to go. On the way home, Metamorpho's friends were puzzled as to how he knew Stagg would be unaffected by the child. Metamorpho indicates that he had hoped the baby would kill Stagg.

In Birds of Prey, Sapphire and Joey are fused into a singular energy being following a lab accident. It is revealed that not only were Sapphire and Joey merged, but so was Stagg, who was directing revenge against his colleagues. The three are separated, with Stagg claiming to have been overcome by energy and unable to control his actions.

In 2016, DC Comics implemented another relaunch of its books called "DC Rebirth" which restored its continuity to a form much as it was prior to "The New 52". In The Terrifics series, Stagg opens a portal to the Dark Multiverse which Metamorpho, Mister Terrific, and Plastic Man travel through, and is present when they return.

== In other media ==
=== Television ===
- Simon Stagg appears in the Justice League episode "Metamorphosis", voiced by Earl Boen. This version transformed Rex Mason into Metamorpho using mutagens that were originally intended to help workers survive harsh conditions. Additionally, Stagg tricked him into fighting Green Lantern and the Justice League and inadvertently contributes to the creation of a chemical monster that Mason and the League eventually defeated.
- Simon Stagg appears in Beware the Batman, voiced by Jeff Bennett. This version mutated Rex Mason into Metamorpho via weaponized toxic gas that was created as part of "Project Metamorpho" in a failed attempt at keeping him away from his daughter Sapphire Stagg.
- Simon Stagg appears in The Flash episode "Fastest Man Alive", portrayed by William Sadler. This version is a philanthropist, inventor, and acquaintance of Harrison Wells. Danton Black targets Stagg for stealing his research and taking credit for it, though the Flash saves the businessman and defeats Black. Stagg becomes fascinated by the Flash and begins planning to capture and experiment on him, but Wells, who is later revealed to be a disguised Eobard Thawne, kills him to prevent him from interfering with his own plans.
- Simon Stagg makes a non-speaking appearance in the Young Justice episode "Triptych". This version orchestrates a metahuman trafficking ring until he is eventually exposed and arrested.

=== Film ===
Simon Stagg appears in Wonder Woman 1984, portrayed by Oliver Cotton. This version is a former investor of Maxwell Lord.

=== Video games ===
Simon Stagg appears in Batman: Arkham Knight, voiced by Phil Proctor. This version is a philanthropist and entrepreneur from Central City who researches airborne inoculation technology and has been accused of human rights violations. Additionally, he developed clean power cell technology called Nimbus generators for the Scarecrow, who later betrays Stagg and leaves him to be arrested by the GCPD.

=== Miscellaneous ===
Simon Stagg appears in a Dick Tracy comic strip published in February 2018.
