= Spirit King =

The Spirit King
- The Spirit King as depicted in JSA #60 (June 2004). Art by Don Kramer (penciler), Keith Champagne (inker), and Hi-Fi Design (colorist).

Publication information
- Publisher: DC Comics
- First appearance: Justice League of America #171 (October 1979)
- Created by: Gerry Conway; Dick Dillin; Frank McLaughlin

In-story information
- Alter ego: Roger Romaine
- Team affiliations: The Demon Shaitan
- Abilities: Command of the dead Able to possess the bodies of others

The Spirit King (Roger Romaine) is a character in the fictional DC Universe; he was initially an adversary of the original Mister Terrific, but later expanded to be a threat to the entire Justice Society, particularly the Spectre and the Flash.

The character was created for a murder mystery story in the 1970s and retroactively introduced into the fictional history of the character Mister Terrific.

== Fictional character biography ==
During the Golden Age of heroes, Roger Romaine began to kill women in the city of Portsmouth, Washington, believing that he would absorb their spirits and gain command of the dead to use against the living world. Romaine is banished to Hell by the Spectre, despite Mister Terrific insisting that the families of Romaine's victims deserve to see him stand trial.

Now trapped in Hell, Romaine makes a deal with the demon Shaitan, gaining the power to possess the bodies of others in exchange for giving Shaitan the chance to confront the Spectre. Returning to Earth shortly before the annual meeting between the Justice Society and the Justice League, the Spirit King possesses Jay Garrick and kills Mister Terrific, exploiting his speed so nobody can see who the killer is. Eventually discovering the truth, the JSA chases the Spirit King to Earth, but in the ensuing battle, the Spirit King takes control of Doctor Fate. However, the spirit of Mister Terrific returns and disrupts the connection between the Spirit King and Shaitan, returning the Spirit King to Hell.

Years later, the Justice Society investigate a spree of violence in Portsmouth, one of the victims being a friend of Doctor Mid-Nite. While Mid-Nite and the new Mister Terrific (Michael Holt) debate religion in a church, they are visited by Hal Jordan, the current Spectre, who reveals that his attempts to turn the Spectre's mission to one of redemption as opposed to one of vengeance had weakened the Spectre's hold on the spirits he had once damned. As a result, the condemned souls escape, with the Spirit King leading them against the JSA. As the JSA try to hold their own against the undead army, the Spirit King once again possesses the Flash, using him to attack Sentinel and seriously injure Mister Terrific. However, Jordan banishes the Spirit King and his army back to Hell.

== See also ==
- List of Justice League enemies
