= Humpty Dumpty (comics) =

- Humpty Dumpty, as seen in the cover of Arkham Asylum: Living Hell #3 (September 2003).

Publication information
- Publisher: DC Comics
- First appearance: Arkham Asylum: Living Hell #2 (August 2003)
- Created by: Dan Slott (writer); Ryan Sook (artist)

In-story information
- Alter ego: Humphry Dumpler
- Species: Human
- Team affiliations: Secret Society of Super Villains
- Notable aliases: The Hobby Robber; The Super Saboteur
- Abilities: Expertise in gadgetry

Humpty Dumpty (Humphry Dumpler) is a character from DC Comics. Unlike many of Batman's enemies, he is not deliberately malevolent, and is typically portrayed as comic relief.

== Publication history ==
Humpty Dumpty first appeared in the 2003 graphic novel Arkham Asylum: Living Hell and was created by Dan Slott and Ryan Sook.

== Fictional character biography ==
Humphry Dumpler is a hulking man with an egg-shaped head who speaks in rhyme and has a compulsive desire to "repair" that which he considers to be broken. He is shown in flashback to have been the victim of inexplicable, almost supernaturally bad luck almost since birth, illustrated by countless tragedies through his life — culminating with both of his parents being crushed by their Christmas tree, leaving him in the custody of his abusive grandmother. Eventually, he became determined to understand the mechanics of the world around him in an attempt to see what made things go wrong for him and attempt to fix them. In his crimes, Humphry disassembles and reassembles mechanical devices that upset him in some way. The devices he "fixes" cause numerous accidents, such as a subway train he had once missed derailing after he cuts its brakes, crippling several. After finding out that the news media has begun to call him "Humpty Dumpty, Super Saboteur of Gotham", he attempts to flee Gotham on a boat, but misses the departure by an hour; he proceeds to blame the clock tower outside his window, and in adjusting the gears causes one of its hands to fly off, provoking a chain reaction in which dozens of enormous signs crashed to the streets, killing dozens of people. When Batgirl tries to apprehend him, she dislocates her arms rescuing him from falling off the clock tower. Humphry slips her arms back into their sockets and surrenders to her. She asks why he had borrowed a copy of Gray's Anatomy, and he reveals that he had dissected his grandmother and sewn her back together in an attempt to "fix" her.

He is a model prisoner at Arkham Asylum and is given various small projects to pass time, such as repairing a broken mirror (uncovering that a large shard had been stolen as a weapon) and fixing Ventriloquist's Scarface dummy. He befriends the financial fraudster Warren White, and saves his life from Death Rattle and Two-Face.

In Villains United, Humpty Dumpty joins Alexander Luthor Jr.'s Society.

He is one of the villains sent to retrieve the Get Out of Hell free card from the Secret Six.

In the Batman: Battle for the Cowl storyline, Humpty Dumpty is recruited by Black Mask as part of a group of villains aiming to take over Gotham.

In the Batman: Leviathan storyline, Humpty Dumpty masquerades as Santa Claus on Christmas Eve to bring stolen toys to the children "residing" at Rainbow House Shelter, who in actuality are deceased. He is followed and consoled by Batman and Robin, to whom he explains that he found their bodies in a river; the children were victims of a street fighting ring held by Victor Zsasz.

In The New 52 reboot, Humpty Dumpty appears as an inmate of Arkham Asylum.

== In other media ==
- Humpty Dumpty appears in Beware the Batman, voiced by Matt Jones. This version is a former mob accountant under Tobias Whale, who he was meant to testify against before going insane following a failed attempt on his life carried out by Whale's men.
- A biography for Humpty Dumpty appears in Batman: Arkham Asylum.
- Humpty Dumpty appears as a character summon in Scribblenauts Unmasked: A DC Comics Adventure.

== See also ==
- List of Batman family enemies
