= Circus of Strange =

Fictional organization

Publication information
- Publisher: DC Comics
- First appearance: Batman and Robin #1 (August 2009)
- Created by: Grant Morrison; Frank Quitely

In-story information
- Member(s): Professor Pyg; Big Top; Mister Toad; Phosphorus Rex; Siam; Dollotrons

Circus of Strange is a fictional organization appearing in American comic books published by DC Comics.

== Publication history ==
The Circus of Strange first appeared in Batman and Robin #1 (August 2009), and was created by Grant Morrison and Frank Quitely.

== Fictional team history ==
The Circus of Strange is a criminal group led by Professor Pyg which first became known to Batman and Robin when they captured one of its members, Mister Toad. When the Circus of Strange members Big Top, Phosphorus Rex, Siam, and the Dollotrons storm the Gotham City Police Department, Batman and Robin help to fight them; four police officers were killed and six other police officers were injured. During a training exercise, Robin is captured by the Dollotrons. Batman discovers that Pyg is planning to make specific people into his Dollotrons. When Robin regains consciousness, he meets Pyg, who prepares to transform him into a Dollotron. When Batman arrives, Robin breaks free and helps to defeat Pyg.

Following The New 52 continuity reboot, the Circus of Strange members are shown to be a part of Leviathan.

== Members ==
- Professor Pyg - The leader of the Circus of Strange.
- Big Top - A bearded fat lady who wears a tutu.
- Dollotrons - The brainwashed, doll-masked minions of Professor Pyg and the Circus of Strange.
- Mister Toad - A toad-like member of the Circus of Strange.
- Phosphorus Rex - A pyrokinetic member of the Circus of Strange. An alternate version of Rex appeared in Batman in Bethlehem.
- Kushti - Conjoined triplets who are members of the Circus of Strange.

== In other media ==
Professor Pyg, Mister Toad, and Phosphorus Rex appear in Beware the Batman, voiced by Brian George, Udo Kier, and Greg Ellis, respectively. Pyg and Toad are depicted as eco-terrorists while Rex, also known as Milo Match, is a lawyer who works for Tobias Whale.

== See also ==
- List of Batman family enemies
