= Beware the Batman =

American animated television series

- Genre: Superhero; Neo-noir
- Based on: Batman by: Bob Kane; Bill Finger (uncredited)
- Developed by: Glen Murakami; Sam Register; Mitch Watson; Butch Lukic
- Directed by: Sam Liu; Rick Morales; Curt Geda; Andrea Romano (voice director)
- Voices of: Anthony Ruivivar; JB Blanc; Sumalee Montano; Kurtwood Smith
- Theme music composer: Dum Dum Girls
- Opening theme: "Beware the Batman", performed by Dum Dum Girls
- Ending theme: "Beware the Batman" (instrumental)
- Composer: Frederik Wiedmann
- Country of origin: United States
- Original language: English
- No. of seasons: 1
- No. of episodes: 26

Production
- Executive producer: Sam Register
- Producers: Glen Murakami; Mitch Watson
- Editor: Joe Gall
- Running time: 21–22 minutes
- Production companies: DC Entertainment; Warner Bros. Animation

Original release
- Network: Cartoon Network
- Release: July 13 – October 5, 2013
- Network: Adult Swim (Toonami)
- Release: July 27 – September 28, 2014

Related
- Batman: The Brave and the Bold; Batman: Caped Crusader

Beware the Batman is an American animated television series based on the DC Comics superhero Batman. Produced by Warner Bros. Animation and DC Entertainment, the series premiered in the United States on Cartoon Network on July 13, 2013, as part of the DC Nation programming block, replacing Batman: The Brave and the Bold.

The series was pulled from Cartoon Network's schedule four months after its premiere, without official explanation. After being put on hiatus, the remaining episodes of the series began to air on Adult Swim's Toonami programming block, from July 27 to September 28, 2014, with a total of twenty-six episodes having aired altogether. The series then premiered in Canada on October 11, 2013, on Teletoon and was cancelled after its twenty-sixth episode.

== Premise ==
The series is set in Gotham City during the early years of Bruce Wayne (voiced by Anthony Ruivivar) as Batman, following his initial period of battling organized crime. Throughout the series, he hones his combative skills with the assistance of his butler Alfred Pennyworth (voiced by JB Blanc), who introduces Bruce to his goddaughter Tatsu Yamashiro (Sumalee Montano), a martial artist and swordmistress hired to act as his bodyguard, as well as Batman's partner under the codename of Katana. Also present is Lt. Jim Gordon (Kurtwood Smith), a member of the Gotham City Police Department, who gradually becomes Batman's ally.

== Characters ==
We've taken the essence of all the characters and we've put sort of a different spin on it. You know, there's some stuff we can't adapt because it's too complicated or [not fit for a kids' show].

— Glen Murakami, 2012

Crime-fighting vigilante Batman teams up with swordmistress Katana and his ex-secret agent butler Alfred Pennyworth to face the criminal underworld of Gotham, led by Anarky, Magpie, the League of Assassins (consisting of Ra's al Ghul, Lady Shiva, Silver Monkey, Cypher) Tobias Whale, Phosphorus Rex, Professor Pyg, Mister Toad, Key, Killer Croc, and Humpty Dumpty,Harvey Dent,The Manhunters and Deathstroke. In particular, Anarky was originally intended to be the main villain.

While the developers allowed license themselves to stylize the characters' appearances, the series' villains were particularly designed to be "over-the-top".

== Production ==
=== Development ===
Initial promotional art for the series depicted Alfred armed with guns and fighting alongside Batman. Fans of the Batman mythos were upset by this depiction of Alfred, prompting a response from the series' producers.

After the previous Batman series, Batman: The Brave and the Bold, ended in November 2011, a new series featuring the DC Comics superhero immediately went into production, in order for Batman to return to a more "serious tone". With Batman receiving a new sidekick, Outsiders member Katana, executive producer Sam Register commented that "Katana is gonna be his new Robin, but not necessarily". The series was produced in 3D computer animation, similar to the animation style of the earlier DC series Green Lantern: The Animated Series.

In the wake of the 2012 Aurora, Colorado shooting, which occurred during a screening of the Batman film The Dark Knight Rises, the series' content was altered to make the firearms depicted in the series look less realistic. In addition, initial announcements for the series were accompanied with promotional art unintended for public release, which depicted Alfred as a gun-toting butler fighting alongside Batman. Fans of the Batman mythos were upset by this, arguing against Alfred's participation in Batman's exploits and his use of deadly firearms as against Batman's principles. In response to fan criticism, series developer Glen Murakami acknowledged that the poster was an inaccurate representation of what the character's actual role would be; he elaborated that the poster was intended to be an action-themed shot that displayed the cast of characters, but felt that Alfred's portrayal had been misleadingly made more exciting. Murakami joked: "You can't have an action pose of a guy standing with a tray". Mitch Watson also noted the problem with Alfred fighting alongside Batman, as he would be recognized as Bruce Wayne's butler and would reveal the identity of Batman as a result. Regardless, both producers insisted that Alfred would remain true to his intended characterization in the series as Batman's mentor, who could potentially help Batman if an episode's plot called for it. Scott Thill, technology and pop culture commentator for Wired magazine, praised the producers' initial choice to debut the villain Anarky on television, claiming that the character was relevant following the rise of the Occupy movement and the hacktivist activities of Anonymous.

In promoting the series, Warner Bros. debuted a trailer a month prior to the series premiere, featuring action sequences from the first three episodes and highlighting Batman, Professor Pyg and Toad, Magpie and Anarky. On July 2, the opening title sequence was released to Entertainment Weekly, a week prior to the premiere. It depicted Batman, Alfred, Katana and the Batmobile in a stylized red background with stark red lighting effects, contrasted by dark shadows and silhouettes. The show's opening theme was composed by the rock band Dum Dum Girls while the background score was composed by Frederik Wiedmann.

=== Animation ===
The way these guys have constructed the city itself—I mean, they're still building it; they're building Gotham City itself—it's not just a couple of sets.

— Mitch Watson, 2012

The requirements of 3D animation at times necessitated that inanimate objects, such as ships and city streets, were built rather than drawn, which created a need for the completion of entire set designs. While this would increase production times, it would also allow animators to bring cinematic qualities of lighting and camera play to the series. Batman's utility belt was fully recreated from cardboard and worn by Murakami's design team in order to test how the belt would function while in motion. Watson said: "If you really built it, it would work". Batarangs were designed to flip-open and function when retrieved from the belt. The Batmobile was also subjected to scrutiny, as a "certain amount of weight" was added to it as it moved on city streets, out of concern that it would be unbelievable otherwise.

=== Cancellation ===
Three months after the series premiere, Beware the Batman was pulled from the Cartoon Network schedule and put on hiatus on October 23, 2013. Cartoon Network did not provide an official explanation behind the hiatus, leading fans to believe that the network had already cancelled the series. The network then moved the series to the Toonami programming block on its late-night Adult Swim block, whereupon Toonami first aired the series on May 11, 2014, during the early-morning time slots. After Cartoon Network declared the series a financial failure and decided to write it off alongside fellow Toonami series Sym-Bionic Titan (removing it from the network altogether), Toonami ran a marathon of the final seven unaired episodes of the series on September 28 to avoid abruptly ending the series' run.

== Episodes ==
No.	Title	Directed by	Written by	Original release date	Prod. code	US viewers (millions)
1	"Hunted"	Sam Liu	Mitch Watson	July 13, 2013	101	1.34
Eco-terrorists Professor Pyg and Mister Toad are hunting Gotham City's resident billionaires Simon Stagg, Michael Holt and Bruce Wayne to make them pay for their crimes against nature. Now, with the stakes being the billionaires' lives, Batman has to solve this case fast but when Wayne's butler, Alfred, is kidnapped in Bruce's place, Batman must save him. Later, Alfred hires a new bodyguard for Bruce: Tatsu Yamashiro. Introducing characters: Batman / Bruce Wayne, Alfred Pennyworth, Katana / Tatsu Yamashiro, Professor Pyg / Lazlo Valentin, Mister Toad, Simon Stagg, Lieutenant James "Jim" Gordon, and Michael Holt
2	"Secrets"	Rick Morales	Mitch Watson	July 20, 2013	102	1.12
Batman is hot on the heels of an extremely dangerous thief named Magpie, who not only sports razor-sharp fingernails laced with poison but is also invulnerable to pain, but he is not the only one after her. Lieutenant James Gordon is after her as well, and the two will ultimately go head-to-head to catch her. Introducing characters: Magpie / Margaret Sorrow, Oracle / Barbara Gordon, Bethanie Ravencroft, Thomas Wayne, Martha Wayne, Lunkhead, and Joe Braxton.
3	"Tests"	Curt Geda	Jim Krieg	July 27, 2013	103	1.20
A new villain has arrived in Gotham to challenge Batman: Anarky. Resembling a ghost image of Batman, Anarky prides himself on his brilliance and intends to prove it to Batman by manipulating a pair of street thugs, Junkyard Dog and Daedalus (known as Doodlebug in the comics), to do his bidding. But Anarky's real plan is far more devastating: seeking to create a disaster seen by all of Gotham and proving once and for all that even the great Batman is powerless to keep his fair city safe. Note: This episode marks the first appearance of Anarky.
4	"Safe"	Sam Liu	Mark Banker	August 3, 2013	104	1.22
Introducing the prototype of his newest product to the entire world, the Ion Cortex, a device capable of solving the world's energy crisis, Bruce Wayne hires brilliant scientist Dr. Jason Burr to work on the project. The announcement also draws the attention of the League of Assassins. When Silver Monkey, one of the League's members, attacks Wayne Manor, it is up to Alfred and Katana to keep the assassin at bay until Batman returns. But Katana is armed and ready for the task with the legendary Soultaker Sword, a sacred weapon she stole from the League of Assassins back when she used to work for them. Note: This episode marks the first time Tatsu Yamashiro is referred to as "Katana".
5	"Broken"	Rick Morales	Michael Ryan	August 10, 2013	105	1.17
Strange and life-sized army men have started appearing all over Gotham, armed with real weapons. When Batman investigates, however, he discovers that they are not toys, but people trapped inside explosive shells. All the clues lead to a former mob accountant named Humphrey Dumpler (a.k.a. Humpty Dumpty), who used to work for crime boss Tobias Whale, but went insane when Whale tried to silence him before he could testify. Dumpty wants payback and the next person he's targeted is Lt. James Gordon.
6	"Toxic"	Curt Geda	Erin Maher & Kathryn Reindl	August 17, 2013	106	1.11
After responding to a break-in at Stagg Industries, Batman rescues a security guard named Rex Mason who had been exposed to a weaponized toxic gas known as "Project Metamorpho". Soon, Rex begins to mutate and gains the ability to manipulate the elements of his own body. Terrified and unable to control his new abilities, Rex becomes a fugitive. Realizing that this metamorphosis is slowly killing Rex, Batman sets out to find a cure. However, Rex is only concerned about his lover Sapphire Stagg. He will risk all of Gotham to be with her, but her father Simon Stagg holds secrets of his own and will do anything to keep them apart.
7	"Family"	Sam Liu	Mark Banker	September 7, 2013	107	1.02
With the League of Assassins knowing where the Soultaker Sword is, but unable to get Katana to return it, Silver Monkey (with the help of Bethanie Ravencroft) decides that the only course of action is to kidnap Bruce Wayne and hold him for ransom, his life for the sword. When Katana shows up to turn over the Sword and rescue Wayne, Alfred causes a diversion, buying Wayne enough time to suit up and join the battle. Teaming up with Katana to fight Silver Monkey and his men, Batman finds himself in an all-out ninja fight when Lady Shiva shows up in person.
8	"Allies"	Rick Morales	Erin Maher & Kathryn Reindl	September 14, 2013	108	1.09
Tobias Whale is the most powerful gangster in Gotham City, and, after years of trying, Lt. Gordon finally has the evidence to put him away for good. But Whale is not going to be "harpooned" easily. After his lawyer demands that Gordon release Whale, Gordon's daughter Barbara is kidnapped. With no other options and time running out, Gordon is forced to ask Batman for help. While monitoring Whale's men, Batman learns that Barbara has been taken to "The Cauldron" (a former industrial park that became the most dangerous part of the city following the financial crisis years ago) which is populated by a gang of criminals known as "the Ghosts". With Katana's help, Batman stages a raid on the Cauldron. The real threat here is not the Ghosts, but the man guarding Barbara: Whale's chief enforcer, Phosphorus Rex.
9	"Control"	Curt Geda	Michael Stern	September 21, 2013	109	1.52
Desperate to gain access to the Ion Cortex after the failed kidnapping of Jason Burr, Lady Shiva sends one of her specialized agents to steal the information directly from Burr's mind: the cyborg assassin Cypher. Batman and Katana try to stop Cypher, but Katana gets herself captured. Now, Batman must find a way to take down Cypher while he is in control of both Burr and Katana.
10	"Sacrifice"	Sam Liu	Mark Banker	September 28, 2013	110	1.22
After stealing a valuable package from the League of Assassins, Anarky makes a deal with Lady Shiva to steal a deadly virus, in return for her "package". At the same time, he informs Batman where he can find Shiva: the Gotham Contagion Research Center (a building that handles rare and deadly viruses). Although they know it's a trap, Batman and Katana go anyway. Once inside, Anarky releases one of the airborne viruses into the building. Now Batman, Katana, and Shiva have to escape the building before its breach protocol is initiated, while staying ahead of two mutated assassins. In the end, Anarky gives Shiva back the package he stole which contains the body of Ra's al Ghul.
11	"Instinct"	Rick Morales	John Matta & Matt Weinhold	October 5, 2013	111	1.25
Professor Pyg and Mister Toad are back, and this time, they've set their sights on Gotham's elite couture culture. Leaving clues that only Batman can decipher, they attack both a fashion model and a clothing designer. Even though Batman and Katana are able to save them, they end up uncovering Professor Pyg and Mister Toad's master plan: to destroy the yacht where the after-party for Gotham's Fashion Week is being held.
12	"Attraction"	Curt Geda	Len Wein	July 27, 2014	112	0.51
Unbeknownst to both Alfred and Katana, Batman has been making visits to Blackgate Penitentiary to see Magpie. Helping her to regain some of her former memories, Batman has felt guilty that she did not get the psychological care she needed. When Magpie sees Batman with Katana, however, she breaks out, willing to kill Katana in a jealous rage.
13	"Fall"	Sam Liu	Mark Banker	August 3, 2014	113	0.65
Jason Burr (who is still under Cypher's control) steals the Ion Cortex for the League of Assassins as Lady Shiva brings Ra's al Ghul out of suspended animation. Batman believes that he has turned to evil, but Katana does not. Batman, Katana, and Alfred then find themselves in a difficult situation as they battle the League of Assassins in a fight to save Gotham City from darkness. As they try to stop Jason from activating the Ion Cortex, Katana discovers that he is being controlled by Cypher. With Katana's help, he breaks free, Batman promises to help him, but he has to help shut down the cortex. Before he can do so, Shiva uses the sword of souls on him, draining his soul into the sword. Both Batman and Katana are captured, but Ra's al Ghul allows Batman to fight him (all the while being plagued by memories of Alfred's early lessons to him), and as a result of him losing is captured by Ra's al Ghul, while Katana and Alfred are left scared and alone.
14	"Darkness"	Rick Morales	Mitch Watson	August 10, 2014	114	0.59
Batman makes an unlikely alliance with Silver Monkey to escape from the League of Assassins. Katana questions Alfred on why they left Batman and if Ra's al Ghul killed her father. Alfred tells her that they were outnumbered and would not be any good to him if they were dead; he also denies what Ra's said, and Katana hopes he is telling the truth, for his sake. Meanwhile, Katana, Alfred, Lieutenant Gordon, and Barbara take action by trying to hijack the cortex, as Ra's al Ghul's attempts to cleanse the city during as the blackout has left it terrorized by the Ghosts and other criminals. Batman escapes but at the cost of Silver Monkey's life. Katana finds out the truth about her father, and tries to kill him but both are taken away an put in separate cells. Ghul tries to get Batman to surrender, but he refuses. Before he escapes, Batman unlocked Blurr's backdoor, allowing Barbara to hack in. Ghul frees all the criminals that Batman put away in hopes of defeating him.
15	"Reckoning"	Curt Geda	Mitch Watson	August 17, 2014	115	0.69
Ra's al Ghul recruits all of the imprisoned super villains to eliminate Batman in exchange for control of a piece of the city. Ghul makes an offer to Katana: kill Alfred and he will release her father from the Sword of Souls, who has been trapped ever since Alfred escaped from him long ago. Before killing Alfred, Katana wants to hear the truth from him. Alfred tells her that her father sacrificed himself. When Ghul captured the two men year ago, the sword was about to drain Alfred's soul, and her father took his place. This allowed Alfred to escape. With this new information, she refuses to kill him. Batman makes a deal with Mr. Whale, who brings him to Ghul. Ghul and Batman fight while Lt. Gordon and Barbara hack and disable the Ion Cortex. Batman then releases the souls from the sword who take Ghul away. Katana sees her father one last time before he leaves. Alfred leaves to set his wrongs from his past life's right, while Batman and Katana set out to continue saving Gotham. Note: There are at least two Looney Tunes references in this episode: one near the beginning when Tobias Whale calls Professor Pyg "Porky" and later when Pyg calls Magpie "Tweety".
16	"Nexus"	Sam Liu	Mark Banker	August 24, 2014	116	0.75
Six months after the blackout, Batman trains Katana harder than he ever has, showing signs of unusual behavior ever since Alfred left. Meanwhile, new mayor Marion Grange appoints District Attorney Harvey Dent to put a stop to the city's masked vigilantes. Batman is later framed for an attack on the two and kidnaps Dent to draw the attention of the real perpetrator, who turns out to be Anarky. He places wrist bombs on Batman, Katana, Dent and himself and threatens to blow a park if Batman does not walk with Dent and surrenders to the police. Pretending to comply, Batman takes Dent to the park to disable its hidden explosives. Katana flees from Anarky, making him follow her. Just as Batman is about to disable the explosives, Anarky and Katana arrive on the scene. As they fight, Batman manages to slip all their wrist bombs onto Anarky, making him unable to detonate the explosives without dying in the process. In the end, he blows up the park and escapes through the sewer system. Everyone survives the attack, and Katana calls Alfred, announcing that they need him.
17	"Monsters"	Rick Morales	Greg Weisman	September 7, 2014	117	0.55
A mystery being known as "the Golem" starts stopping crime in the district of Old Gotham. While in patrol, Batman and Katana find the Golem and begin chasing him. They eventually find out Rex Mason is the Golem and team-up with him to combat an army of armored thugs that have been terrorizing that neighborhood. In addition, they also dodge Harvey Dent's newly created Special Crimes Unit, which has been ordered to take down both the armored criminals and the vigilantes fighting them. After the failed attempt to capture the vigilantes, Dent is approached by Anarky to help bring down Batman. Batman figures out that it was Sapphire Stagg who gave the thugs their high-tech equipment. He warns her that she does not want be his enemy. She asks if the Golem is Rex, but he denies it. Note: At the end of the episode, Rex ends up taking the codename "Metamorpho" and alludes to the future emergence of the Outsiders.
18	"Games"	Curt Geda	Adam Beechen	September 14, 2014	118	0.70
Batman, Katana, Commissioner Gordon, Mayor Grange, and Tobias Whale all wake up after being drugged and kidnapped by Humpty Dumpty. According to Dumpler, there is a culprit among them and the only way to escape his Murder Mystery Game is to figure out who. With each clue, however, the game becomes deadlier and begins to take its toll on Batman who's obsessed with solving the mystery and defeating Dumpty.
19	"Animal"	Sam Liu	Mark Banker	September 21, 2014	119	0.68
The Key, a master thief, steals the most valuable piece of code-breaking software in the world. He is later arrested by Harvey Dent and sent to jail. With Key at Blackgate Penitentiary, Batman has himself arrested to recover the dangerous software. Before imprisoning him, Dent decides to let Batman keep his mask on, as an unbearable high-pitched frequency is emitted whenever someone tries to remove it. The Key is taken hostage by the prison's "king", Killer Croc. In order to get to the Key, Batman has to fight Killer Croc and his friends. The constant string of fights finally gets the best of him, as he beats Croc senseless. He is about to mindlessly kill Croc when Katana arrives and halts him. After cooling down, Batman convinces Key to cooperate. Nearly scared to death, Key agrees. The police then arrive and Killer Croc escapes into the sewers, plotting his next move. Back at Wayne Manor, Bruce is badly hurt from his encounter. As he lays in bed, Alfred returns home to look after him. Note: Penguin is referenced by Harvey Dent and is seen on a wanted poster.
20	"Doppelganger"	Rick Morales	John Matta & Matt Weinhold	September 28, 2014	120	0.65
In order to keep his enemies closer, Bruce Wayne befriends Harvey Dent and the captain of the SCU, Dane Lisslow, with whom he makes a strong connection. Wanting to become mayor, Dent tries to win Bruce's financial support. Their meeting is cut short when Bruce sees what looks to be a giant bat. Intrigued, he starts investigating and finds out that, recently, there have been break-ins at several chemical facilities. This all seems to be connected with Professor Pyg and Toad who seem to be after samples of animal DNA. At one of the facilities, Batman and Katana encounter the Man-Bat creature. After a chase, Batman knocks him out and takes him to the cave. There, they learn that Man-Bat is actually scientist Kirk Langstrom. He became a monster when Pyg and Toad injected him with a serum of his own making. The two are kidnapping civilians to create an army of human-animal hybrids. Kirk teams-up with Batman and Katana to stop the experiments. After a fight, the villains are sent to prison, and Man-Bat decides to keep looking for a cure to his condition. At the mansion, Bruce agrees to support Dent to keep an eye on him. Note: Barbara Gordon takes the codename "Oracle" in this episode.
21	"Unique"	Curt Geda	Ivan Cohen	September 28, 2014	121	0.63
Scientist doctor Sprangle is attacked by two Manhunters, super soldiers sent by The Council, a mysterious organization. They then attack Ava Kirk, but she is saved by Bruce and Katana and taken to the mansion for safety. She agrees to stay there, as Bruce is an old friend. While investigating, the heroes find a warehouse full of Manhunters. Paul Kirk, Ava's father, then appears and disintegrates them. It turns out that the Council cloned him to build an army of Manhunters. Sprangle worked there and freed Paul after discovering what was going on. Meanwhile, the clones break into the mansion and kidnap Ava. They are controlled through a neuron network, which also allows the Council to communicate with Paul. They tell him that if he ever wants to see Ava again he must come alone to the Gotham Bridge. With Ava's life threatened, Paul decides to surrender himself, but it all turns out to be a ruse that ends up saving Ava and imprisoning an important member of the Council. Still having to destroy the Council, Paul says good-bye. Before leaving, he asks Batman to watch over Ava. Batman agrees. Introducing characters: Manhunters
22	"Hero"	Sam Liu	Mark Banker	September 28, 2014	122	0.60
Desperate to rid Gotham of Batman, Harvey Dent finds a new ally in Anarky, who recruits a new "hero" to take Batman's place: Deathstroke. There's only one problem: as long as he kills Batman, Deathstroke does not care who gets hurt.
23	"Choices"	Rick Morales	Mark Hoffmeier	September 28, 2014	123	0.59
When Batman and Katana are ambushed by Killer Croc in the subway, they are trapped in a hole filled with quick-drying cement. Batman calls Alfred for assistance, but he is too far away to get there in time, and things become worse when he is knocked unconscious by Killer Croc. It soon becomes up to Barbara Gordon to save them. There are a few problems: Barbara is on a date and with two off-duty cops following her, she is stuck in a three-way mess. To make things worse, she has to save them by rerouting the trains' routes, but her phone keeps losing service. She saves Batman and Katana without anyone finding out, but Killer Croc comes after her; meanwhile, Alfred regains consciousness and frees Batman and Katana, just in time for them to save Oracle. They defeat Killer Croc, and everyone goes home safe and sound.
24	"Epitaph"	Curt Geda	Mitch Watson	September 28, 2014	124	0.57
At a rally to announce Harvey Dent's run for mayor, tragedy strikes when Bruce Wayne is apparently assassinated by Batman. Although this is impossible, only Alfred and Katana know it. Bruce survives, but instead of telling the world, decides to stay dead as Batman hunts for his imposter.
25	"Twist"	Sam Liu	Mark Banker	September 28, 2014	125	0.59
Batman continues to work in secret while the world believes that Bruce Wayne is dead. Meanwhile, Harvey Dent recovers in the hospital - badly burned after his own encounter with the Batman imposter - and blames the real Batman for destroying his chances to become mayor. Now scarred inside as well as out, Dent takes matters into his own hands and enacts martial law and orders the police to hunt Batman down and bring him to justice: dead or alive.
26	"Alone"	Rick Morales	Mitch Watson	September 28, 2014	126	0.64
Harvey Dent faces off against Anarky as Batman and Katana fight their way out of a building surrounded by the GCPD. Meanwhile, Deathstroke makes his escape in the Batmobile, finds the Batcave, takes Alfred hostage, and issues Batman an ultimatum: if he ever wants to see Alfred alive again, he must come to Wayne Mansion alone. Note: In the end of the episode, it is implied that Batman, Katana, Oracle, Man-Bat and Metamorpho form the Outsiders.

== Awards and nominations ==
Year	Award	Category	Nominee	Result
2013	Annie Award	Best Animated TV/Broadcast Production For Children's Audience		Nominated
2014	Daytime Emmy Award	Outstanding Children's Animated Program	Sam Register, Glen Murakami, Mitch Watson, Amy McKenna	Nominated
2014	Daytime Emmy Award	Outstanding Casting for an Animated Series or Special	Andrea Romano	Nominated
2014	Daytime Emmy Award	Outstanding Directing in an Animated Program	Butch Lukic, Curt Geda, Sam Liu, Rick Morales, Andrea Romano	Nominated
2014	Daytime Emmy Award	Outstanding Main Title and Graphic Design	T.J. Sullivan	Nominated

== Home media ==
The first 13 episodes of the series were released on Blu-ray and DVD in a collection titled Beware The Batman: Season 1 Part 1 – Shadows of Gotham on February 18, 2014. The twelfth and thirteenth episodes had yet to air, despite being released on this collection. A second collection, titled Beware The Batman: Season 1 Part 2 – Dark Justice, was released on September 30 the same year, containing the remaining 13 episodes of the show's only season.

== Adaptations ==
Writers Mike W. Barr (co-creator of the character Katana), Scott Beatty, Matt Manning and Ivan Cohen (who wrote the episode "Unique") and artists Luciano Vecchio and Dario Brizuela produced an original comic book set in the continuity of the television series.

- DC Nation #2 (vol. 1) (2012-11-07)
- Beware the Batman #1 (2013-10-23)
- Beware the Batman #2 (2013-11-27)
- Beware the Batman #3 (2013-12-31): "In The Mouth of the Whale!"
- Beware the Batman #4 (2014-01-29): "Bat vs. Bat"
- Beware the Batman #5 (2014-02-26): "Two Katanas"
- Beware the Batman #6 (2014-03-26): "First-Person Shooter"
- Beware the Batman (2015-01-21): includes issues #1–6, "Rough Seas" (from DC Nation Free Comic Book Day Super Sampler: Beware the Batman/Teen Titans Go! #1).

An online game titled Gotham Streets was posted on the Cartoon Network site in 2014.

== See also ==
- List of animated television series of 2013
- List of programs broadcast by Cartoon Network
- List of television series based on DC Comics publications
