= Metamorpho =

DC Comics superhero

- Metamorpho as depicted on the variant cover of Metamorpho: The Element Man #1 (December 2024). Art by Fico Ossio.

Publication information
- Publisher: DC Comics
- First appearance: The Brave and the Bold #57 (January 1965)
- Created by: Bob Haney Ramona Fradon

In-story information
- Alter ego: Rex Mason
- Species: Metahuman
- Team affiliations: Outsiders; Justice League Europe; The Terrifics; Seven Soldiers of Victory; Doom Patrol; Stagg Enterprises; Justice League
- Notable aliases: The Element Man; Dyna-Man
- Abilities: Elemental transmutation; Superhuman strength and durability; Hyperelasticity; Immortality

Metamorpho (Rex Mason) is a superhero appearing in American comic books published by DC Comics. Created by Bob Haney and Ramona Fradon, the character debuted as the lead feature in The Brave and the Bold (January 1965). Originally an adventurer, he was converted into a metahuman made of several different elemental substances after being cursed by an ancient artifact while on an expedition. He is a founding member of the Outsiders, and has also joined multiple incarnations of the Justice League.

Anthony Carrigan portrays the character in the DC Universe (DCU), beginning with the film Superman (2025). Additionally, Tom Sizemore, Scott Menville, Adam Baldwin, and Fred Tatasciore have voiced the character in animation.

== Creation ==
In a 2013 interview with Comic Book Resources, Fradon spoke on the character's genesis stating,

"Metamorpho was George Kashdan's idea. He had studied science when he was in school and he thought of a character made of four elements who could change himself into different chemical compounds. He gave Bob Haney the idea, and Bob fleshed it out brilliantly. I believe George continued to supply the "scientific" details for Bob to use throughout the life of the feature.

Bob, George and I got together to figure out what the character should look like. He wasn't your average super hero so capes and masks didn't suit him. I tried a lot of those and finally decided that since he was always changing his shape, clothes would get in his way. So I drew him in tights, with a body made up of four different colors and textures that were supposed to indicate the four elements."

== Publication history ==
Metamorpho's creator, Bob Haney, had seen success with DC Comics in 1964 with the titles Metal Men and Doom Patrol, featuring bands of superheroes exhibiting fantastic powers. Under the editorial management of George Kashdan, Haney was asked to capitalize on these titles' popularity with a similar character. Metamorpho debuted in The Brave and the Bold #57 (January 1965).

As first conceived, Metamorpho was a parody of the fantastic characters that populated comic books in the 1960s. Artist Ramona Fradon was coaxed out of maternity retirement to illustrate Metamorpho's first appearances. The popularity of Metamorpho's appearances in The Brave and the Bold led to a 17-issue ongoing series between 1965 and 1968. Metamorpho also appeared in two issues of Justice League of America (#42 and #44), but did not join the eponymous group and became a reserve member.

Metamorpho appears on the cover of Aquaman #30 as one of the pallbearers (along with Batman, Hawkman, and Superman) at the "Sea King's Funeral". Metamorpho also appears in a series of backup stories in Action Comics #413–418 and World's Finest Comics #218–220 and #226, #228 and 229.

In 1975, Metamorpho appeared in 1st Issue Special #3, a brief anthology series consisting of one-shots. That issue was written by Bob Haney and illustrated by Ramona Fradon, Metamorpho's creators. Haney and Fradon had met at the 1974 San Diego Comic-Con, and while reminiscing, it emerged that both of them regarded Metamorpho as one of the features they most enjoyed working on, leading them to ask DC if they could do one more Metamorpho story together. Fradon later commented: "I think we both felt that Metamorpho was our baby. I never had an experience like I had working with Bob Haney on Metamorpho. It was like our minds were in perfect synch ... it was one of those wonderful collaborations that doesn't happen very often".

After becoming a charter member of the Outsiders in 1983, and member of the European branch of the Justice League International, Metamorpho received his own four-issue mini-series in 1993. In 2005, DC Comics reprinted Metamorpho's early The Brave and the Bold appearances and the entirety of the 1965 series as one of the company's volumes of Showcase Presents. In 2007, Dan Jurgens launched the six-issue series Metamorpho: Year One.

As part of Wednesday Comics, Neil Gaiman wrote a 12-page Metamorpho story that Mike Allred illustrated. In 2016, Metamorpho starred in the anthology series Legends of Tomorrow alongside Firestorm, Sugar and Spike, and the Metal Men.

In 2024, Metamorpho received a new series, Metamorpho: The Element Man, as part of the DC All In initiative, which lasted for six issues. It was written by Al Ewing and illustrated by Steve Lieber.

== Fictional character biography ==
Rex Mason is an amoral adventurer and mercenary who is hired by Stagg Enterprises CEO Simon Stagg to steal an Egyptian artifact, the Orb of Ra. Shortly after hiring him, Simon Stagg learns that Mason has been secretly dating his daughter Sapphire Stagg. This and other incidents begin to fuel in Stagg a dislike for Mason that ultimately leads to a plot to kill him.

Inside the pyramid where the Orb is hidden, Mason is knocked unconscious by Simon's brutish bodyguard Java and exposed to a radioactive meteorite from which the Orb of Ra was fashioned, transforming him into Metamorpho, the Element Man. Shocked by Mason surviving, Stagg instead manipulates him to do his bidding by using the meteorite's energy to threaten him. Later, it is revealed that Ra created Metamorpho and similar beings to help him battle his mortal enemy, Apep.

Metamorpho, unlike most super-humanoids described in DC Comics, does not possess a fully human appearance. Similar to the Marvel Comics character Thing, he considers himself a "freak" and wishes only to be restored to his former human state, rejecting an offer of membership from the Justice League in Justice League of America #42 because of this. Green Lantern attempts to change him back using his power ring but is stopped by a "yellow" component of the meteorite radiation.

Metamorpho briefly has a crimefighting partner named Urania "Rainie" Blackwell, a woman who deliberately exposed herself to the Orb to gain its powers. She calls herself Element Girl (nicknamed "the Chemical Doll") and works with him on a number of cases.

Issues #16–17 were intended to show a new direction for the series, with Sapphire marrying a man named Wally Bannister and Metamorpho joining a mysterious Mr. Shadow to deal with an immortal queen. Bent on world conquest, the queen (an exact lookalike of Sapphire) marries Metamorpho. She later steps outside her mystic city and instantly ages 2,000 years. When Wally Bannister is murdered by Algon (a metamorph who has lived for centuries in a depowered state), Metamorpho is framed. Instead of coming to his defense against the false accusations, Metamorpho's colleague Mr. Shadow comes forth as an enemy. It is revealed that Mr. Shadow was attempting to enslave Metamorpho all along. Metamorpho is tried and convicted by a jury of rabble and is then executed.

Element Girl revives Metamorpho, and Algon, the real murderer, is killed by molten lava in an attempt to regain his burned-out powers. It is later learned that Mr. Bannister's murder was engineered by the villainous Prosecutor, who is then killed by an insectoid villain. At this point, issue #17 ends, and the story is never continued.

Metamorpho reappears years later in The Brave and the Bold #101 (April–May 1972). It is revealed that Metamorpho had spent the period after the end of his own series immersed in a chemical bath concocted by Stagg in an attempt to cure his condition. Stagg retrieves him from this "cure" early because he needs Mason to save Sapphire. Metamorpho stars in a new backup series beginning in Action Comics #413 (June 1972). There is no reference in this revival series to the events or characters of the last two issues of his previous series.

Urania Blackwell, unreferenced since the end of the regular series, is later revealed to have ended her partnership with Metamorpho when her unrequited attraction to him became too much for her. Blackwell's powers are removed at her own request by Ra, resulting in her death; the episode, in Neil Gaiman's Sandman, involves Death of the Endless. Death mentions Algon's death in passing, trying to convince Blackwell that she will not live forever.

=== Outsiders ===
Metamorpho spends some time working with the Outsiders. While in the despotically ruled nation Mozombia, Metamorpho is subdued and disassembled. The tyrant's forces keep him inert with a constant application of radiation. He is freed by Katana's indestructible sword, which had been latched onto a live electrical wire. While leaving Mozombia, the Outsiders' plane is shot down by the Bad Samaritan. Metamorpho and the others spend some time stranded on a deserted island, too far away from land to rescue themselves.

In the 1988 event Millennium, Helga Jace betrays the Outsiders and kills Metamorpho. In the 1989 event Invasion!, Metamorpho is resurrected when the Dominators' gene bomb detonates.

=== Justice League ===
Metamorpho spends some time with the Justice League, including Justice League Europe. During this period, he encounters Sapphire Stagg again. He becomes involved in a battle with the Metal Men, who have been tricked by Simon Stagg. His League friends, Rocket Red and Animal Man, are at the site of the battle, but are being detained by Java. After the battle, Metamorpho learns he had a son with Sapphire, but the baby boy's touch harms all but Sapphire and Metamorpho. When Java holds the baby, his arms melt. Metamorpho hands the baby over to Simon, who immediately fears he will be affected like Java was moments before and die. However, something in his genetic structure protects him, just as it did with Sapphire. Simon's stance softens and everyone is set free. Doc Magnus, the leader of the Metal Men, offers his services in creating new arms for Java. On the way home, Metamorpho's friends are puzzled as to how he knew Simon would be unaffected by the child. Metamorpho indicates that he hoped the baby would kill Simon.

Later, Metamorpho has a romantic relationship with Crimson Fox, which is cut short by her apparent murder. His personal investigation of the incident uncovers multiple layers of lies and deceit. During his time with the team, while fighting the planet-smashing aliens called The Family, Metamorpho is hit by a powerful energy blast that destroys his body. He later reforms his body with a new appearance.

=== Third death and return ===
When the Hyperclan attack the Justice League of America's orbiting base, destroying it, Metamorpho protects three of his teammates, Nuklon, Obsidian, and Icemaiden, in a giant, fluid filled ball. The intent is for them to survive reentry into Earth's atmosphere. The three make it, injured but alive, but Metamorpho is killed in the process. Later, he is definitively brought back to life by Sapphire Stagg using the Orb of Ra, and he briefly joins the Doom Patrol.

=== Outsiders ===
At the same time, Metamorpho has seemingly been appearing in the Outsiders (vol. 3) series, but Rex Mason informs the team that their "Metamorpho" is a regrown fragment of his body.

Metamorpho continues to serve on the Outsiders when Batman takes over, and after its further restructuring following Batman's apparent death. He is apparently killed yet again alongside the rest of the team in a satellite explosion orchestrated by Talia al Ghul.

=== The New 52 ===
In 2011, "The New 52" rebooted the DC universe. One story reveals that the Outsiders have survived. It is stated that Metamorpho was able to save the team by the same technique he previously used to rescue the Justice League during Hyperclan's attack. He is also shown as one of the candidates for the new Justice League International, but is ultimately not chosen.

=== DC Rebirth ===
Metamorpho is transmuted into Nth Metal by Simon Stagg as part of his plot to open a portal to the Dark Multiverse. While trying to get Simon Stagg to close the portal with the help of Plastic Man, Mister Terrific is sucked in to the portal with Plastic Man and Metamorpho. Plastic Man shields the others from the Dark Multiverse energy, which he is immune to. Upon arriving on a lifeless world, they encounter Phantom Girl, who is trapped in her intangible form and has no knowledge she has been sending a signal. When the four of them find a computer in the stomach of a dead giant creature, they are greeted by a hologram of Tom Strong who states that they are needed to save the universe. Mister Terrific, Plastic Man, and Metamorpho learn from Phantom Girl that she has been stuck in intangible form since she was a child. After the four of them make it back to their world, Mister Terrific tries to leave the three of them at Simon Stagg's compound only to be drawn back to them. Mister Terrific concludes some bond created by the effects of the Dark Multiverse energy prevents them from being too far apart.

The Terrifics take on Rex's fellow element man Algon, who plans to turn everyone in the world into element people. In the process of defeating him by using the Orb of Ra, Metamorpho is turned human again. Metamorpho slowly comes to feel he is dull and worthless without his heroic role. On purpose, Rex and Element Dog sneak into Stagg Industries and use the Orb of Ra to return to their elemental forms. They rejoin the other heroes to fight Doctor Dread's Dreadfuls. Subsequently, Rex is made chief security officer at Stagg Industries, and his relationship with Sapphire is repaired.

== Powers and abilities ==
Metamorpho can transmute his body into a wide variety of elemental compounds and form them at will. Originally, he was limited to elements that were naturally found in the human body, but later overcame this limitation. He can stretch, bounce, elongate, and reform himself like rubber or plastic. Rex is able to alter the consistencies of these chemical elements and combine them into complex compounds. Metamorpho could reshape parts or the whole of his body. Rex's body provides him with natural armor, offering damage resistance from blunt and energy attacks. He is also a skilled martial artist, archaeologist, and detective.

== Enemies ==
Besides dealing with Simon Stagg and Java, Metamorpho had his own rogues gallery in his comics:

- Achille La Heele – A casino owner who claims Metamorpho from Simon Stagg.
- Ahk-Ton – A priest during the time of Ramses II who had the same powers as the Orb of Ra.
- Algon – A Metamorph from Ancient Rome.
- Cha-Cha Chavez – A South American playboy and dictator of his unnamed homeland.
- Doc Dread – A costumed criminal and gang leader.
- Edifice K. Bulwark – An architect, chemist, engineer, and self-proclaimed "Big Builder" who Simon Stagg once transformed into a Metamorpho to use its abilities to build a special building.
- El Matanzas – A dictator who used his futuristic robots to rule a South American valley full of cavepeople.
- Franz Zorb – A scientist assigned to restore Metamorpho back to Rex Mason only for his experiment to be a cover for the manufacturing of his Chemo-Robots.
  - Chemo-Robots – Six elemental robots created by Franz Zorb, consisting of Halfnium, Osmium, Selenium, Strontium, Tantalum, and Thallium.
- Jezeba – The Queen of Fury from the hidden African valley of Ma-Poor who is familiar with Algon's history.
- Jillian Conway – An archaeologist and former colleague of Rex Mason who was also exposed to the Orb of Ra which made her appearance less human.
- Kurt Vornak – A former lab assistant of Simon Stagg who was turned into a being of pure atomic energy in a plot to finish an experiment by Stagg that went wrong.
- Maxwell Tremaine – A criminal scientist and former Nazi.
- Nicholas Balkan – A criminal who sought to use the Telstar satellite to assist in his criminal empire.
  - Gunther – One of Nicholas Balkan's sons.
  - Lothar – One of Nicholas Balkan's sons.
  - Siegfried – One of Nicholas Balkan's sons.
- Otto von Stuttgart – A criminal who captured Simon Stagg and 11 vulcanologists with plans to threaten the world with a neutron dissolver.
- Phantom of Washington – Achille Destinee is a French soldier who worked for Napoleon and Benjamin Franklin before being killed during the American Revolution. His ghost took on the alias of the Phantom of Washington who appeared before people like Abraham Lincoln, Woodrow Wilson, and Franklin D. Roosevelt ever since he came in contact with an Egyptian artifact.
- Prosecutor – A fanatic criminal who framed Metamorpho for Wally Bannister's murder.
- Stingaree – A criminal mastermind who is the leader of the Cyclops Organization.
- T.T. Trumbull – An entrepreneur and engineer who plotted to destroy Metamorpho and blackmail the United States of America from his secret Science Station Alpha in the Grand Canyon.
- Thunderer – A pint-size demagogue from another dimension.
  - Neutrog – The henchman of Thunderer.
- Vrag-Kol – A criminal who led his gang into posing as invading aliens.

== Other versions ==
=== DC: The New Frontier ===
An alternate universe version of Metamorpho makes a cameo appearance in DC: The New Frontier #12 as a member of the Justice League.

=== JLA: The Nail ===
An alternate universe version of Metamorpho appears in JLA: The Nail #2. Jimmy Olsen brainwashes an unstable Metamorpho into helping him spread anti-metahuman propaganda by threatening to kill his family. As part of Olsen's plans, Metamorpho is forced to kill the Thinker and attack a LexCorp tower in Metropolis until he is stopped by J'onn J'onzz. Metamorpho attempts to warn him of Olsen's plot, but dies due to Olsen's brainwashing.

=== Justice ===
An alternate universe version of Metamorpho appears in Justice #7 as a member of the Justice League.

== In other media ==
=== Television ===
Metamorpho as he appears in Justice League Unlimited.

- In the 1960s, due to the success of the show The Superman/Aquaman Hour of Adventure, Filmation produced a Metamorpho pilot, which also includes a concept drawing, but the plans were cancelled when CBS secured the animation rights to Batman in the wake of ABC's recent success with Batman (1966).
- Metamorpho appears in series set in the DC Animated Universe (DCAU):
  - First appearing in the Justice League two-part episode "Metamorphosis", voiced by Tom Sizemore, this version is a former Marine and old friend of John Stewart who is engaged to Sapphire Stagg. After discovering the two's relationship, Simon Stagg mutates Mason into Metamorpho using mutagens that were originally intended to increase workers' resistance to hostile environments. Simon manipulates Mason into fighting Stewart under the belief that he stole his fiancée until Sapphire clears up the misunderstanding. Mason later joins forces with Stewart and the Justice League to stop a monster inadvertently unleashed by him and Simon.
  - Metamorpho makes non-speaking appearances in Justice League Unlimited as a member of the Justice League.
- Metamorpho appears in Batman: The Brave and the Bold, voiced by Scott Menville. This version is a teenager and member of the Outsiders.
- Metamorpho appears in Beware the Batman, voiced by Adam Baldwin. This version's powers were the result of his being exposed to mutagens. Additionally, he goes on to become a founding member of the Outsiders.
- Metamorpho appears in Young Justice, voiced by Fred Tatasciore. This version is a member of Batman Inc. who experiences constant pain as a side effect of using his powers, though he has learned to live with it.

=== Film ===
- Metamorpho makes a cameo appearance in Justice League: The New Frontier.
- An evil, alternate universe version of Metamorpho named Megamorpho makes a non-speaking cameo appearance in Justice League: Crisis on Two Earths as a member of the Crime Syndicate.
- Metamorpho appears in Teen Titans Go! To the Movies.
- Metamorpho appears in Justice League: Crisis on Infinite Earths.
- Metamorpho appears in Superman, portrayed by Anthony Carrigan. This version is held in an extradimensional prison by Lex Luthor along with his son, Joey. He is initially coerced into using his powers to weaken Superman, but relents when Luthor torments the latter by murdering one of his supporters. After Superman agrees to rescue Joey, Metamorpho helps him escape and returns Joey to his wife Sapphire before assisting the Justice Gang in foiling a foreign invasion. Afterwards, he is invited to formally join the Justice Gang.

=== Video games ===
Metamorpho appears as a character summon in Scribblenauts Unmasked: A DC Comics Adventure.

=== Miscellaneous ===
- Metamorpho appears in the Justice League of America spin-off LP, "Metamorpho — The Element Man — Fumo, The Fire Giant", by Power Records.
- Metamorpho appears in Justice League Unlimited #31.
- Metamorpho appears in Smallville Season 11: Continuity #4 as a member of the Outsiders.
- Metamorpho appears in the Injustice: Gods Among Us prequel comic as a member of High Councilor Superman's Regime and the warden of an underwater prison who is eventually killed by Deathstroke.
- Metamorpho makes non-speaking cameo appearances in DC Super Hero Girls.
- Metamorpho appears in the Batman: Arkham Knight prequel comic as the subject of Stagg Enterprises's "Project: Meta", which was originally developed to weaponize a sample of Clayface's body. Batman later destroys Metamorpho after the project's head scientist accidentally releases it.
- Metamorpho appears as part of Lego's DC Super Heroes minifigure series.
