= The New Age of DC Heroes =

Comics line

Publication information
- Publisher: DC Comics
- Genre: Superhero
- Publication date: January 2018 – September 2020

The New Age of DC Heroes (originally titled as Dark Matter) is a comic book line published by DC Comics from 2018 to 2020. The titles – Damage, The Silencer, Sideways, The Terrifics, The Curse of Brimstone, The Immortal Men, New Challengers, and The Unexpected – were set in the DC Universe following the events of Dark Nights: Metal. The line was considered a commercial failure.

== Publication history ==
The Dark Matter line was in development since 2016 alongside The Sandman Universe. Both comic lines are set in the DC Universe after the events of Dark Nights: Metal, and feature new characters alongside re-imagined versions of old ones from DC Comics. Dark Matter was rebranded as "The New Age of DC Heroes" in the following year. All of the constituent series were cancelled in 2019, except The Terrifics, which continued until 2020, with its last three issues published digital-only, during the COVID-19 pandemic.

== List of titles ==
=== Damage ===
- Written by: Robert Venditti
- Drawn by: Tony S. Daniel
- Schedule: January 18, 2018 – April 17, 2019
- Issues: #1–16 (plus 1 annual)

Ethan Avery is a soldier who submits to an experiment that turns him into a monster called Damage leading him to question everything he believed about his cause.

=== The Silencer ===
- Written by: Dan Abnett
- Drawn by: John Romita Jr.
- Schedule: February 1, 2018 – June 26, 2019
- Issues: #1–18 (plus 1 annual)

Honor Guest is a retired assassin who is targeted by her former employers, Leviathan.

=== Sideways ===
- Written by: Dan DiDio and Justin Jordan
- Drawn by: Kenneth Rocafort
- Schedule: February 15, 2018 – February 27, 2019
- Issues: #1–13 (plus 1 annual)

Derek James gains the abilities to travel across dimensions.

=== The Terrifics ===
- Written by: Jeff Lemire
- Drawn by: Ivan Reis
- Schedule: March 1, 2018 – September 1, 2020
- Issues: #1–30 (plus 1 annual)

After Simon Stagg opens a portal to the Dark Multiverse, Mister Terrific, Metamorpho, Plastic Man and Phantom Girl join forces to escape the Dark Multiverse and end up cosmically tethered together to prepare for a threat from the Dark Multiverse while using one of Stagg Enterprises' facilities as their base and having come across a message from Tom Strong.

=== The Curse of Brimstone ===
- Written by: Justin Jordan
- Drawn by: Philip Tan
- Schedule: April 4, 2018 – March 7, 2019
- Issues: #1–12 (plus 1 annual)

In order to protect his hometown, Joe Chamberlain makes a deal with the demon Brimstone, but Joe must track down and destroy Brimstone before the power he now wields destroys the town he was trying to save.

=== The Immortal Men ===
- Written by: James Tynion IV
- Drawn by: Jim Lee
- Schedule: April 11 – September 14, 2018
- Issues: #1–6

Led by the Immortal Man, they are a team of immortal heroes who protected the world from an ancient threat.

=== New Challengers ===
- Written by: Scott Snyder and Aaron Gillespie
- Drawn by: Andy Kubert
- Schedule: May 16 – October 17, 2018
- Issues: #1–6

As the New Challengers, five misfit strangers are given a second chance at life, but only if they obey the orders of the mysterious Professor and execute deadly missions in the most unexplored corners of the multiverse.

=== The Unexpected ===
- Written by: Steve Orlando
- Drawn by: Ryan Sook
- Schedule: June 6, 2018 – January 9, 2019
- Issues: #1–8

Janet Fals, alias Firebrand, is a former paramedic who is forced to feed the Conflict Engine inside her heart by starting a fight every 24 hours.

== See also ==
- Dark Nights: Metal
- The Sandman Universe by Vertigo Comics
