= Mister Terrific =

Name of two DC Comics superheroes

- Artwork for the cover of JSA #70 (April 2005); Art by Dave Gibbons

Publication information
- Publisher: DC Comics
- First appearance: Sloane: Sensation Comics #1 (January 1942); Holt: Spectre (vol. 3) #54 (June 1997)
- Created by: Sloane: Charles Reizenstein; Hal Sharp; Holt: John Ostrander; Tom Mandrake

In-story information
- Alter ego: Terry Sloane; Michael Holt
- Species: Human
- Place of origin: Gateway City, California
- Supporting character of: The Spectre
- Abilities: Both versions are polymaths with a wide range of knowledge on many different fields of study, master martial artists, and Olympic-level athletes.

Altered in-story information for adaptations to other media
- Full name: Curtis Holt

Mister Terrific is the name of two superheroes appearing in American comic books published by DC Comics. The original debuted in Sensation Comics #1 (January 1942), created by Charles Reizenstein and Hal Sharp. The second version debuted in Spectre (vol. 3) #54 (June 1997), created by John Ostrander and Tom Mandrake. Both versions of the characters are superhero polymaths, self-made millionaires, and Olympic-level athletes who use their wealth, intelligence, and skills for the betterment of others, emphasized within their motto of "fairplay".

The original and Golden Age version, Terry Sloane, was a famous former child prodigy who fell into depression as an adult when he found success came too easy and his life lacked meaning. However, after aiding a woman and her younger brother in fending off a gang, he found a purpose and challenge in being a superhero, adopting his fairplay motto in the process. As a superhero, he was a member of the All-Star Squadron and the Justice Society of America until his retirement and subsequent murder by the Spirit King. Eventually succeeding him was Michael Holt, an African-American prodigy who grew up in a poor family, eventually gained accolades in various fields, and founded one of the top tech companies in the world. After the death of his wife, Holt fell into a depression. An encounter with the Spectre and the story of the original Mister Terrific inspired Holt to become a superhero, dedicating his life to helping others as Mister Terrific and adopting his motto. As Mister Terrific, Holt is ranked the third smartest man in the world and has been a major member of the Justice Society of America and Justice League, sometimes serving the teams within a leadership capacity.

The second Mister Terrific has been acclaimed as a high-profile black character in DC Comics. As such, he has been adapted in media, voiced in various animated television series and films by Michael Beach, Hannibal Buress, and Kevin Michael Richardson. In live action, Echo Kellum portrayed a version of the character renamed Curtis Holt in the CW Arrowverse series Arrow, noteworthy for being a openly gay and black superhero for the series. Edi Gathegi portrays the character in the DC Universe film Superman.

== Publication history ==
The original incarnation of Mister Terrific, Terry Sloane, debuted in Sensation Comics #1 (January 1942). The Michael Holt version of the character debuted in Spectre (vol. 3) #54 (June 1997).

== Fictional character biography ==
=== Terry Sloane ===
The original Mister Terrific, Terrance "Terry" Sloane was a polymath, gifted athlete, and self-made millionaire. A renowned business leader and young child prodigy, Sloane suffered an existential crisis when he realized nothing would ever truly challenge him. Attempting suicide, he instead saved Wanda Wilson from her own attempt. To save her brother from a gang, he fashioned the costumed identity of "Mister Terrific". Finding purpose and challenge as a superhero, he created the "Fair Play Club" to stymie juvenile delinquency and devoted his fortune to cleaning up the troubled, decaying neighborhood he'd grown up in.

He would later become an active member of the All-Star Squadron and later the Justice Society of America, wherein he was assisted by a sidekick named Quiz Kid until his disappearance from the Time Masters (retroactively erasing memories of him in the process). The group was dissolved following the House Un-American Activities Committee's order to disband the JSA when they rejected revealing their secret identities, wherein Holt retired and took up a quiet career as an English literature teacher. Some years later, Sloane rejoins the reformed Justice Society, but is killed by his old foe, the Spirit King, when he possessed Jay Garrick to infiltrate the JLA's satellite headquarters.

=== Michael Holt ===
A prodigy who demonstrated advanced intelligence, mastering the work of Niels Bohr, Albert Einstein, Max Planck, and Richard Feynman before he finished middle school, Michael grew up with his mentally challenged older brother, Jeffrey, whom he loved dearly. When Jeffrey died at the age of 12, Michael was devastated. Burying himself in self-improvement, Holt earned fourteen Ph.Ds, competed as an Olympic decathlete, and became a multi-millionaire after founding Holt Industries. Following the death of his wife Paula and their unborn child in a car crash, Holt sells his company and becomes an atheist, with his previous beliefs being shattered by trauma. The night he decides to take his own life, the Spectre appears and tells Holt about Terry Sloane, the Golden Age superhero known as Mister Terrific, noting their similarities. Inspired by Sloane's life story, Holt becomes the second Mister Terrific and joins the Justice Society of America.

During a conflict over leadership of the Justice Society between former chairman Hawkman and the current chairman Sand, Mister Terrific is elected as the JSA's new chairman by his teammates despite not actively seeking the office. He serves in this capacity until the team disbands following the "Infinite Crisis" storyline. Holt also joins the organization Checkmate, which causes him to relinquish his position as chairman to Power Girl.

All-American Kid goes into Mister Terrific's lab and stabs him in the back, pretending to have been mind controlled. Terrific is mortally wounded, but Alan Scott slows time around his body, hoping that he can be healed before he dies. Terrific is healed by Doctor Fate and attacks All-American Kid, who is revealed to be the villain Kid Karnevil in disguise.

In The Terrifics, Mister Terrific stumbles upon Simon Stagg's plot to open a portal to the Dark Multiverse. While trying to get Stagg to close the portal with the help of Plastic Man, Mister Terrific is sucked into the portal with Plastic Man and Metamorpho as Plastic Man shields them from the Dark Multiverse energy. Upon arriving on a lifeless world, they encounter Phantom Girl, who has been trapped in her intangible form and had no knowledge of sending a signal. When the four of them find a computer in the gut of a dead giant creature, they are greeted by a hologram of Tom Strong, who states that they are needed to save the universe. After the four return to Earth, they learn that they have been bonded by the Dark Multiverse energy, which causes them to be forcibly drawn to one another if they try to be apart.

When Wally West's newborn son Wade is kidnapped by Granny Goodness, he organizes a team that includes Mister Terrific to free him from Apokolips. There, it is discovered that Goodness had been training superhuman boys as the Furious, an all-male counterpart to the Female Furies. Among them is Jeffrey Holt, Michael's son, who was taken from a dying Paula Holt's womb and raised as an orphan. After being freed, Jeffrey comes to live with Michael, using the moniker Fairplay.

== Skills and abilities ==
Holt is said to be a polymath genius and inventor, having attained multiple PhDs in various fields, including medicine, engineering, law, and mathematics, and is said to be among the most intelligent individuals on Earth within the DC Universe.Terrific has founded several leading companies and has led several teams and organizations after becoming a superhero. A natural athlete in peak condition and an Olympic gold medalist decathlete, he is also an expert martial artist with six black belts in numerous martial arts disciplines.

=== Equipment and resources ===
Holt also possess advanced technology of his own making; his nanotechnology within his costume cloaks him from being photographed or sensed by radar and audio-senses. His greatest invention, the T-Spheres, are remote-controlled floating robotic spheres with multiple functions that include holographic projection, hacking into other machines, and generating energy bursts. Among other resources includes the T-Sanctuary, a hidden base of operations location in the ninth dimension accessible through specific teleportation, allowing Holt to conduct research and house his T-Spheres.

== Other versions ==
The Holt incarnation has had numerous different versions appear in other Elseworld stories; his Earth-2 version appears in Justice Society of America (vol. 3). This version is a college professor who became a devout Christian after his wife was nearly killed in an accident. In DCeased: A Good Day to Die, he attempts to find a cure for the Anti-Life Equation virus before being killed by an infected Big Barda. He also makes an appearance in "Flashpoint". An alternate universe version of Terry Sloane also appears in JSA: The Liberty File and its sequel JSA: The Unholy Three. This version is a World War II intelligence agent transferred to desk duty, until the untimely death of his fiancé by the Scarecrow. In Kingdom Come, Alex Ross portrayed a Mister Terrific with oversized guns, shoulder pads, and other military accoutrements. He sported the "Fair Play" logo, but displays little idea of its true and original meanings.

== In other media ==
=== Television ===
- The Terry Sloane incarnation of Mister Terrific makes a non-speaking cameo appearance in the Smallville episode "Absolute Justice".
- The Michael Holt incarnation of Mister Terrific appears in Justice League Unlimited, voiced by Michael Beach. This version is a member of the Justice League who later becomes the group's mission coordinator.
- The Terry Sloane incarnation of Mister Terrific appears in the Batman: The Brave and the Bold episode "Crisis: 22,300 Miles Above Earth!".
- Michael Holt appears in the Beware the Batman episode "Hunted", voiced by Gary Anthony Williams. This version is a businessman.
- A character based on Michael Holt / Mister Terrific named Curtis Holt appears in Arrow, portrayed by Echo Kellum.
- The Michael Holt incarnation of Mister Terrific appears in Justice League Action, voiced by Hannibal Buress. This version is the self-proclaimed third-smartest person in the world, a former child prodigy, and college roommate of Martin Stein.

=== Film ===
- An alternate reality version of Michael Holt / Mister Terrific named Mister Horrific makes a non-speaking cameo appearance in Justice League: Crisis on Two Earths as a minor member of the Crime Syndicate.
- An alternate reality version of Michael Holt appears in Justice League: Gods and Monsters, voiced by Arif S. Kinchen. This version is a scientist involved with Lex Luthor's "Project Fair Play", a contingency program meant to counter their universe's Justice League if necessary. After three of their fellow scientists are killed, Holt and the remaining scientists attempt to regroup, but are killed by the Metal Men.
- The Michael Holt incarnation of Mister Terrific appears in Justice League vs. the Fatal Five, voiced by Kevin Michael Richardson.
- The Michael Holt incarnation of Mister Terrific appears in Injustice, voiced by Edwin Hodge.
- The Michael Holt incarnation of Mister Terrific appears in Justice League: Crisis on Infinite Earths, voiced by Ato Essandoh.

=== DC Universe ===
The Michael Holt incarnation of Mister Terrific appears in media set in the DC Universe, portrayed by Edi Gathegi. This version is a member of Maxwell Lord's Justice Gang.

- Holt made his first appearance in the 2025 film Superman. He and his team collaborated extensively with Superman after it was revealed that he had been sent to Earth as a conqueror. However, Holt offered to help Lois Lane free Superman, Krypto, Rex Mason, and his son from Lex Luthor's pocket universe, where Luthor had opened a black hole to draw Superman's attention. To prevent it from destroying Metropolis and spreading to the rest of the world, Holt and Superman were able to thwart Luthor's plans by exposing his evil plot.
- The Michael Holt incarnation of Mister Terrific makes a cameo appearance in the Peacemaker episode "The Ties That Grind".
- The Michael Holt incarnation of Mister Terrific will appear in the film Man of Tomorrow (2027).

=== Video games ===
- The Michael Holt incarnation of Mister Terrific makes a cameo appearance in Injustice: Gods Among Us via the Watchtower stage.
- The Terry Sloane incarnation of Mister Terrific appears as a character summon in Scribblenauts Unmasked: A DC Comics Adventure.
- The Curtis Holt incarnation of Mister Terrific appears as a playable character in Lego DC Super-Villains via the "DC TV Super-Heroes" DLC pack.
- The Michael Holt incarnation of Mister Terrific, based on the DC Universe version of the character, appears as a playable outfit in Fortnite Battle Royale.

=== Merchandise ===
- The Michael Holt incarnation of Mister Terrific received a figure in the DC Universe Classics line.
- The Michael Holt incarnation of Mister Terrific received a figure in the Target-exclusive Justice League Unlimited line.
